= Cache Col =

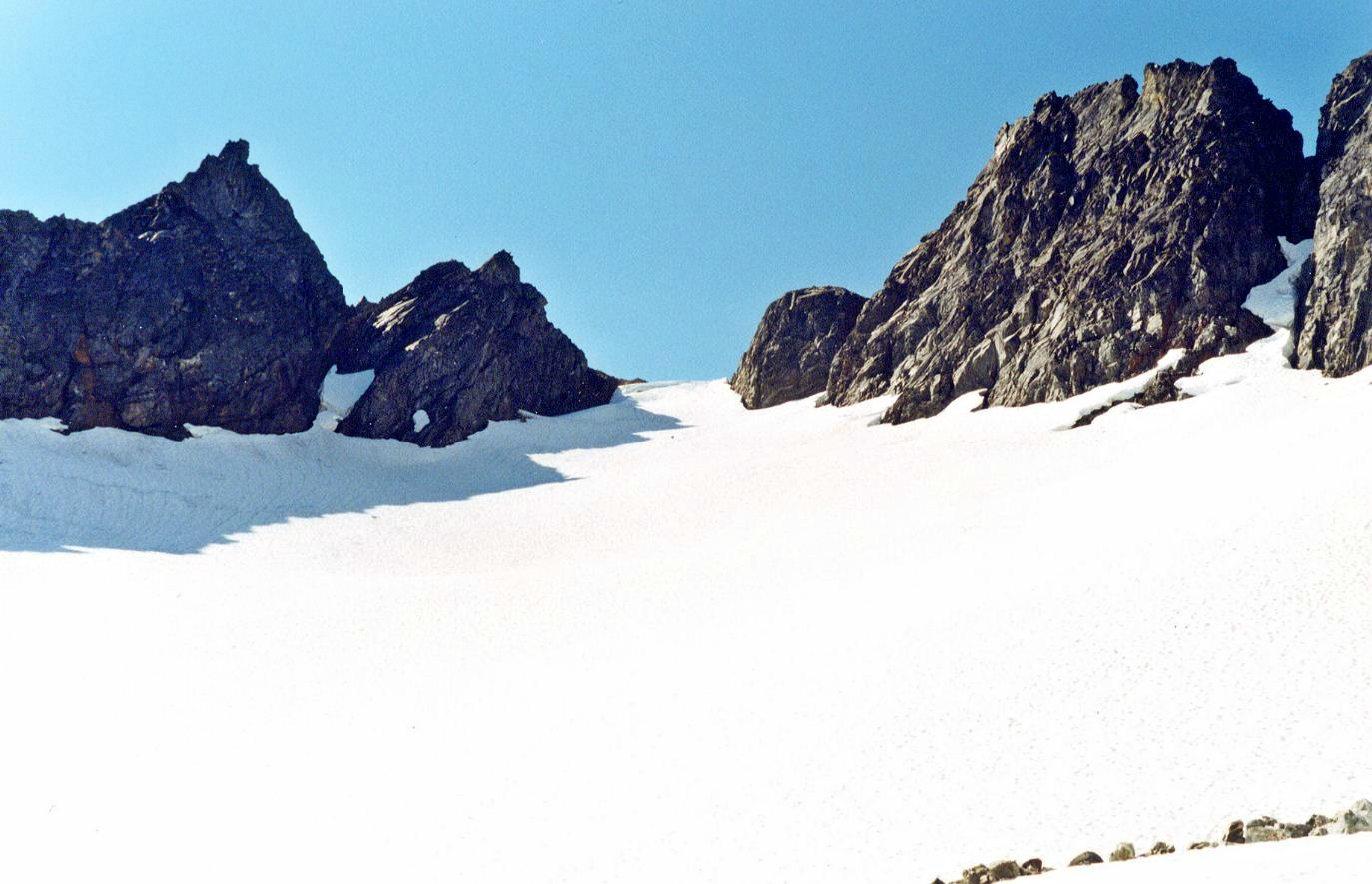

Highest point
- Elevation: 6,903 ft (2,104 m)
- Coordinates: 48°26′54″N 121°03′10″W

Geography
- Location within Washington (state) Location within the United States
- Interactive map of Cache Col
- Country: United States
- State: Washington
- County: Skagit / Chelan
- Protected area: Glacier Peak Wilderness
- Parent range: North Cascades
- Topo map: USGS Cascade Pass

Cache Col is a gap in a high ridge between Magic Mountain and Mix-up Peak. It's located at the highest part of Cache Glacier, on the shared boundary of Skagit County and Chelan County in Washington state. Cache Col is situated south of Cascade Pass on the shared border of North Cascades National Park and Glacier Peak Wilderness. Cache Col and the Cache Glacier are at the northern end of the Ptarmigan Traverse which is mountaineering route that provides access to remote peaks such as Mount Formidable and Dome Peak. Precipitation runoff on the north side of the col drains into the Stehekin River, while precipitation drains into the Cascade River from the south side.

== Climate ==
Cache Col is located in the marine west coast climate zone of western North America. Most weather fronts originate in the Pacific Ocean, and travel northeast toward the Cascade Mountains. As fronts approach the North Cascades, they are forced upward by the peaks of the Cascade Range, causing them to drop their moisture in the form of rain or snowfall onto the Cascades (Orographic lift). As a result, the west side of the North Cascades experiences high precipitation, especially during the winter months in the form of snowfall. During winter months, weather is usually cloudy, but, due to high pressure systems over the Pacific Ocean that intensify during summer months, there is often little or no cloud cover during the summer. Because of maritime influence, snow tends to be wet and heavy, resulting in high avalanche danger.

== Geology ==
The North Cascades features some of the most rugged topography in the Cascade Range with craggy peaks and ridges, deep glacial valleys, and granite spires. Geological events occurring many years ago created the diverse topography and drastic elevation changes over the Cascade Range leading to the various climate differences. These climate differences lead to vegetation variety defining the ecoregions in this area.

The history of the formation of the Cascade Mountains dates back millions of years ago to the late Eocene Epoch. With the North American Plate overriding the Pacific Plate, episodes of volcanic igneous activity persisted. In addition, small fragments of the oceanic and continental lithosphere called terranes created the North Cascades about 50 million years ago.

During the Pleistocene period dating back over two million years ago, glaciation advancing and retreating repeatedly scoured the landscape leaving deposits of rock debris. The U-shaped cross section of the river valleys is a result of recent glaciation. Uplift and faulting in combination with glaciation have been the dominant processes which have created the tall peaks and deep valleys of the North Cascades area.

== Gallery ==
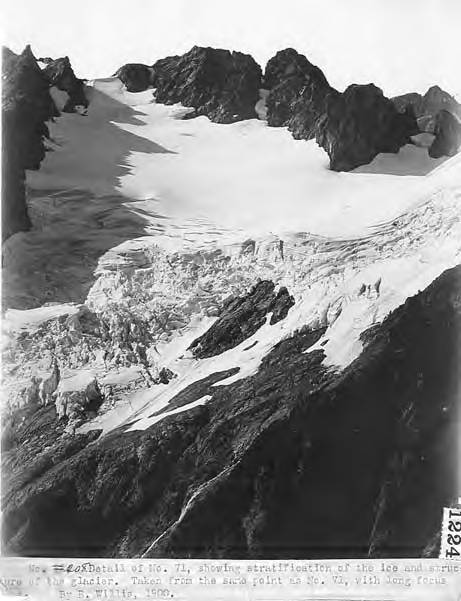
Cache Glacier with Cache Col in upper left, circa 1900

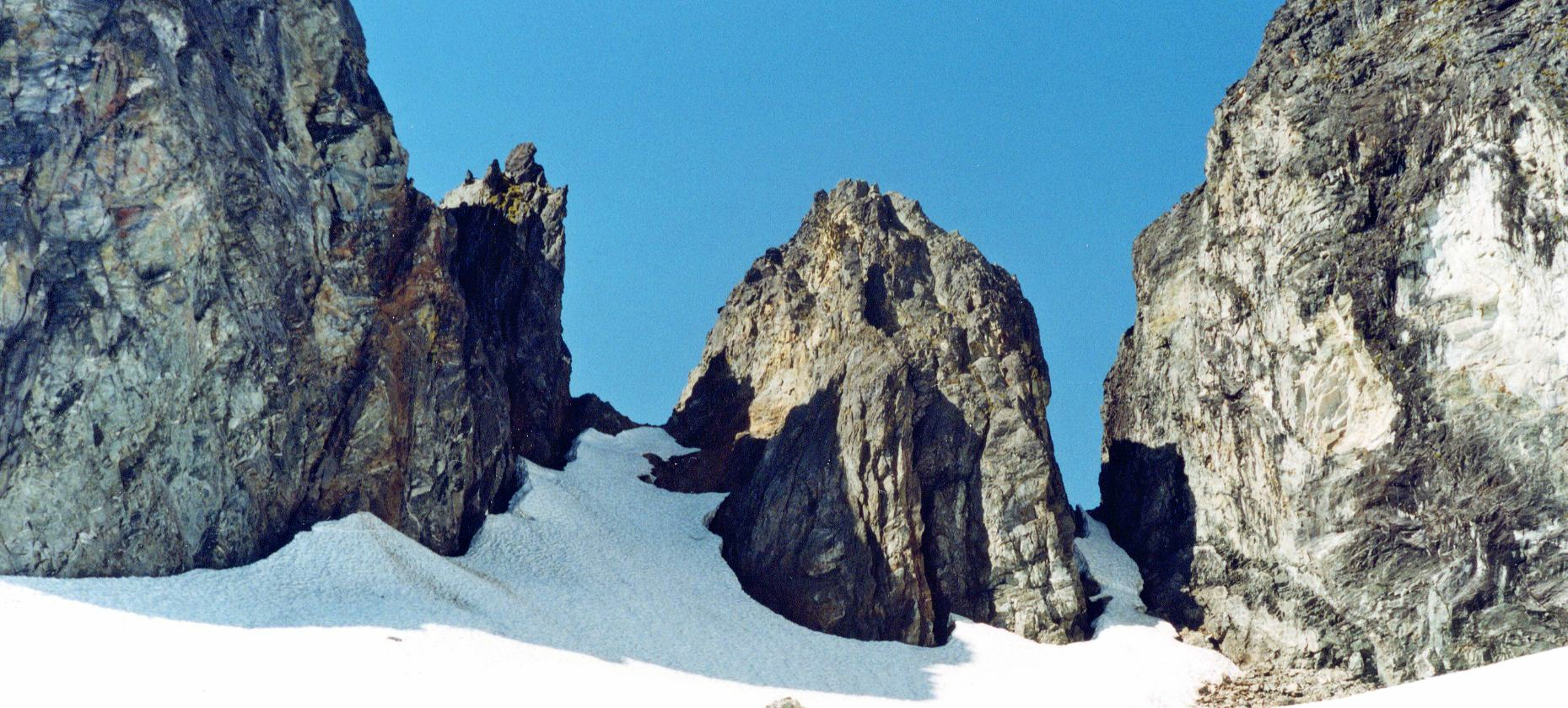
Gunsight Notch, which is lower on the Cache Glacier and should not be mistaken for Cache Col
