= Hurry-up Peak =

Mountain in Washington (state), United States

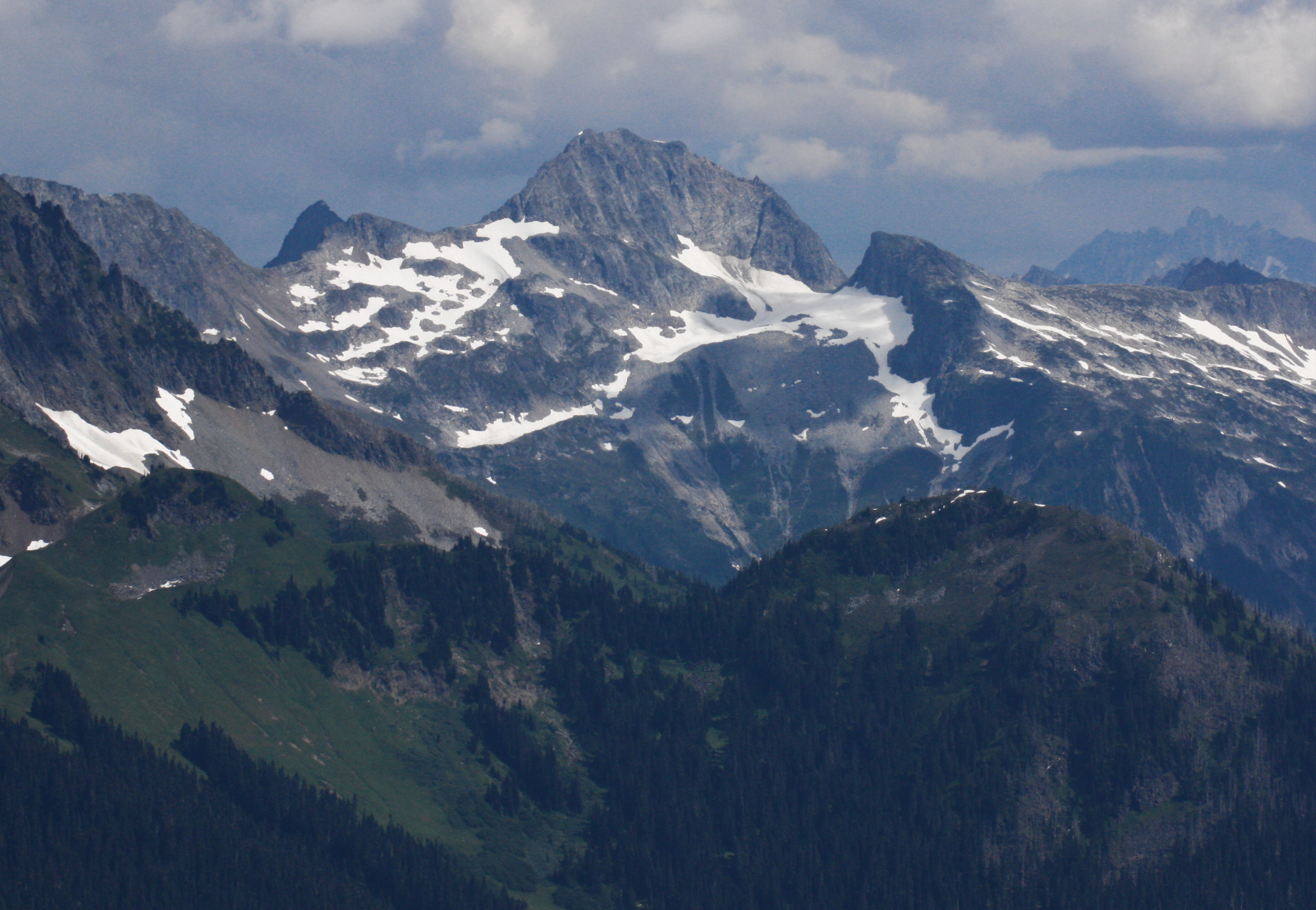
- Hurry-up Peak seen from the northwest from Hidden Lake Peaks

Highest point
- Elevation: 7,821 ft (2,384 m)
- Prominence: 1,061 ft (323 m)
- Parent peak: Spider Mountain (8,286 ft)
- Isolation: 1.61 mi (2.59 km)
- Coordinates: 48°26′02″N 121°02′17″W

Geography
- Location within Washington (state) Location within the United States
- Interactive map of Hurry-up Peak
- Country: United States
- State: Washington
- County: Chelan / Skagit
- Protected area: North Cascades National Park; Glacier Peak Wilderness
- Parent range: North Cascades
- Topo map: USGS Cascade Pass

Geology
- Rock type: Gneiss

Climbing
- Easiest route: class 3 scrambling via Ptarmigan Traverse

Hurry-up Peak is a 7,821-foot-elevation summit located on the shared boundary of Skagit County and Chelan County in Washington state. It is positioned on the crest of the North Cascades Range, and is set at the northern end of the Ptarmigan Traverse. Hurry-up Peak is situated southeast of Cascade Pass on the shared border of North Cascades National Park and Glacier Peak Wilderness. The nearest higher peak is Spider Mountain, 1.49 miles (2.40 km) to the south, with Magic Mountain 0.83 miles (1.34 km) to the north, and Trapper Mountain 0.7 miles (1.1 km) to the east. The S Glacier rests on the eastern flank of the peak and meltwater from it drains into Trapper Lake. Precipitation runoff on the east side the mountain drains into tributaries of the Stehekin River, while precipitation drains into the Cascade River from the west side. Ess Mountain and S Mountain are variant names for Hurry-up Peak. This geographical feature's toponym was officially adopted in 1969 by the U.S. Board on Geographic Names.

== Climate ==
Hurry-up Peak is located in the marine west coast climate zone of western North America. Most weather fronts coming off the Pacific Ocean travel northeast toward the Cascade Mountains. As fronts approach the North Cascades, they are forced upward by the peaks of the Cascade Range (orographic lift), causing them to drop their moisture in the form of rain or snowfall onto the Cascades. As a result, the west side of the North Cascades experiences high precipitation, especially during the winter months in the form of snowfall. Because of maritime influence, snow tends to be wet and heavy, resulting in high avalanche danger. During winter months, weather is usually cloudy, but, due to high pressure systems over the Pacific Ocean that intensify during summer months, there is often little or no cloud cover during the summer.

== Geology ==
The North Cascades features some of the most rugged topography in the Cascade Range with craggy peaks and ridges, deep glacial valleys, and granite spires. Geological events occurring many years ago created the diverse topography and drastic elevation changes over the Cascade Range leading to the various climate differences. These climate differences lead to vegetation variety defining the ecoregions in this area.

The history of the formation of the Cascade Mountains dates back millions of years ago to the late Eocene Epoch. With the North American Plate overriding the Pacific Plate, episodes of volcanic igneous activity persisted. In addition, small fragments of the oceanic and continental lithosphere called terranes created the North Cascades about 50 million years ago.

During the Pleistocene period dating back over two million years ago, glaciation advancing and retreating repeatedly scoured the landscape leaving deposits of rock debris. The U-shaped cross section of the river valleys is a result of recent glaciation. Uplift and faulting in combination with glaciation have been the dominant processes which have created the tall peaks and deep valleys of the North Cascades area.

== See also ==
- Geography of the North Cascades
