= Pelton Peak =

Mountain summit

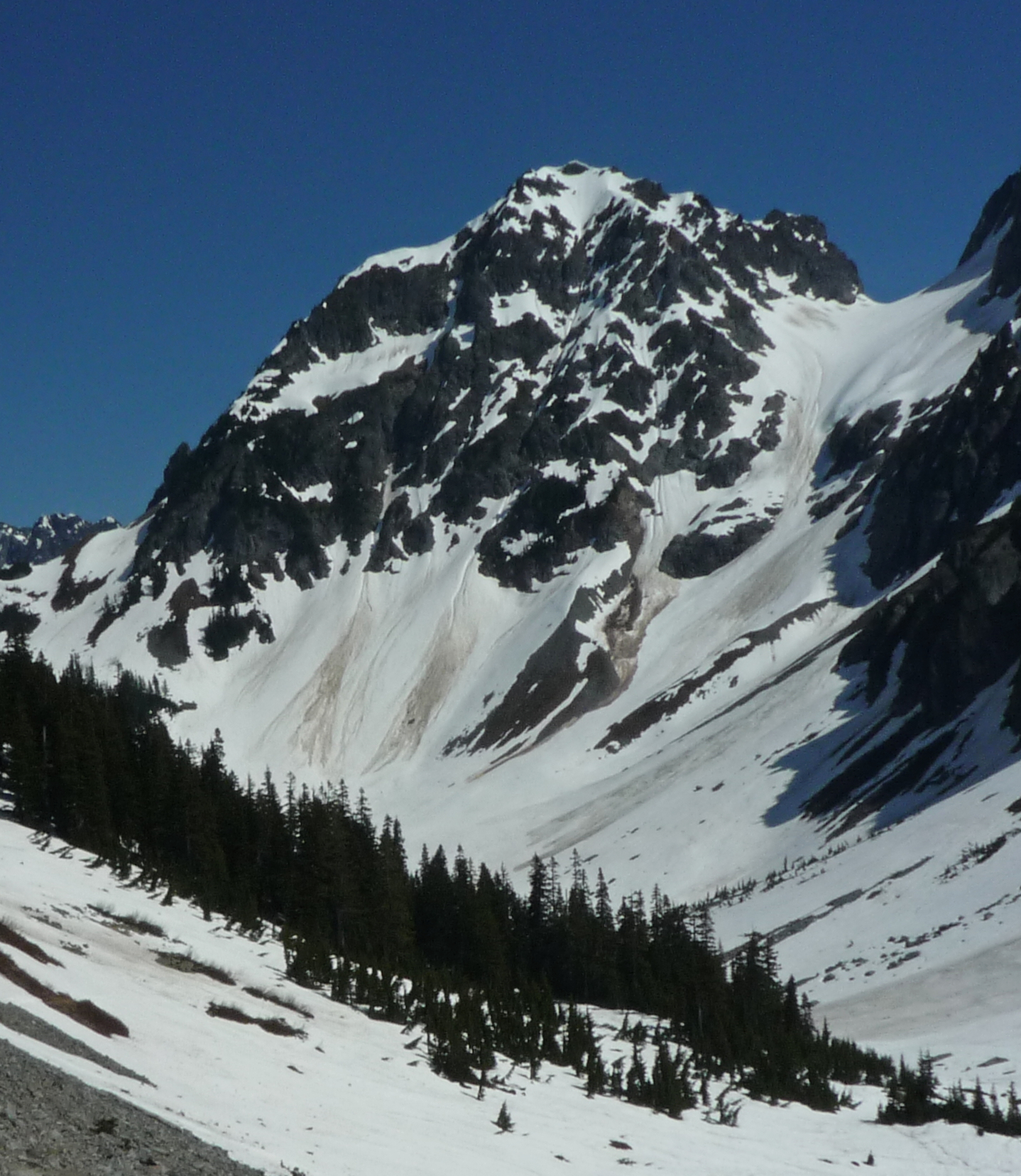
- Pelton Peak, northwest aspect

Highest point
- Elevation: 7,133 ft (2,174 m)
- Prominence: 600 ft (180 m)
- Coordinates: 48°26′55″N 121°01′57″W

Geography
- Location within Washington (state) Location within the United States
- Interactive map of Pelton Peak
- Country: United States
- State: Washington
- County: Chelan
- Protected area: North Cascades National Park
- Parent range: North Cascades; Cascade Range
- Topo map: USGS Cascade Pass

Geology
- Rock type(s): Orthogneiss, Schist

Climbing
- First ascent: August 3, 1948 by Lawrence E. Nielsen and Walt Price
- Easiest route: Scrambling via Magic-Pelton col

Pelton Peak is a 7,133-foot (2,174-metre) mountain summit located in Chelan County of Washington state. It is part of the North Cascades, a subset of the Cascade Range. Pelton Peak is situated 1.8 miles (2.9 km) southeast of Cascade Pass in North Cascades National Park near the northern end of the Ptarmigan Traverse. The nearest higher peak is Magic Mountain, 0.4 miles (0.64 km) to the southwest. The Yawning Glacier rests on its western flank between these two peaks. Surface runoff from the mountain drains into tributaries of the Stehekin River. The mountain's name comes from the Pelton wheel which was used in early mining times, and several mines were located in the vicinity of Pelton Basin, Horseshoe Basin, and Boston Basin.

== Climate ==
Pelton Peak is located in the marine west coast climate zone of western North America. Weather fronts originating in the Pacific Ocean travel northeast toward the Cascade Mountains. As fronts approach the North Cascades, they are forced upward by the peaks (orographic lift), causing them to drop their moisture in the form of rain or snowfall onto the Cascades.As a result, the west side of the North Cascades experiences high precipitation, especially during the winter months in the form of snowfall. Because of maritime influence, snow tends to be wet and heavy, resulting in high avalanche danger. During winter months, weather is usually cloudy, but, due to high pressure systems over the Pacific Ocean that intensify during summer months, there is often little or no cloud cover during the summer.

== Geology ==
The North Cascades features some of the most rugged topography in the Cascade Range with craggy peaks and ridges, deep glacial valleys, and granite spires. Geological events occurring many years ago created the diverse topography and drastic elevation changes over the Cascade Range leading to the various climate differences. These climate differences lead to vegetation variety defining the ecoregions in this area.

The history of the formation of the Cascade Mountains dates back millions of years ago to the late Eocene Epoch. With the North American Plate overriding the Pacific Plate, episodes of volcanic igneous activity persisted. In addition, small fragments of the oceanic and continental lithosphere called terranes created the North Cascades about 50 million years ago.

During the Pleistocene period dating back over two million years ago, glaciation advancing and retreating repeatedly scoured the landscape leaving deposits of rock debris. The U-shaped cross section of the river valleys is a result of recent glaciation. Uplift and faulting in combination with glaciation have been the dominant processes which have created the tall peaks and deep valleys of the North Cascades area.

== Gallery ==
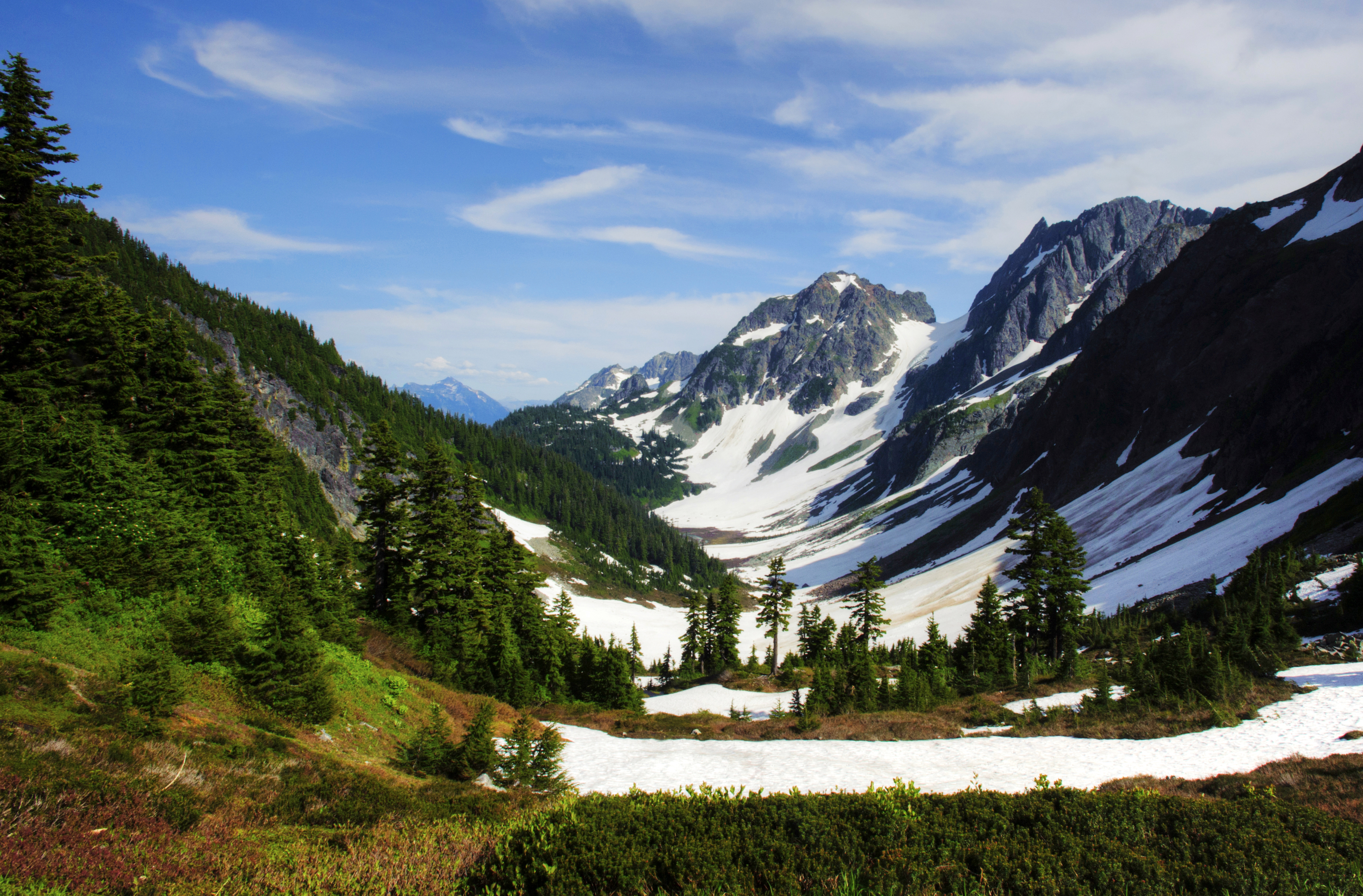
Pelton Peak and Pelton Basin from Cascade Pass in summer

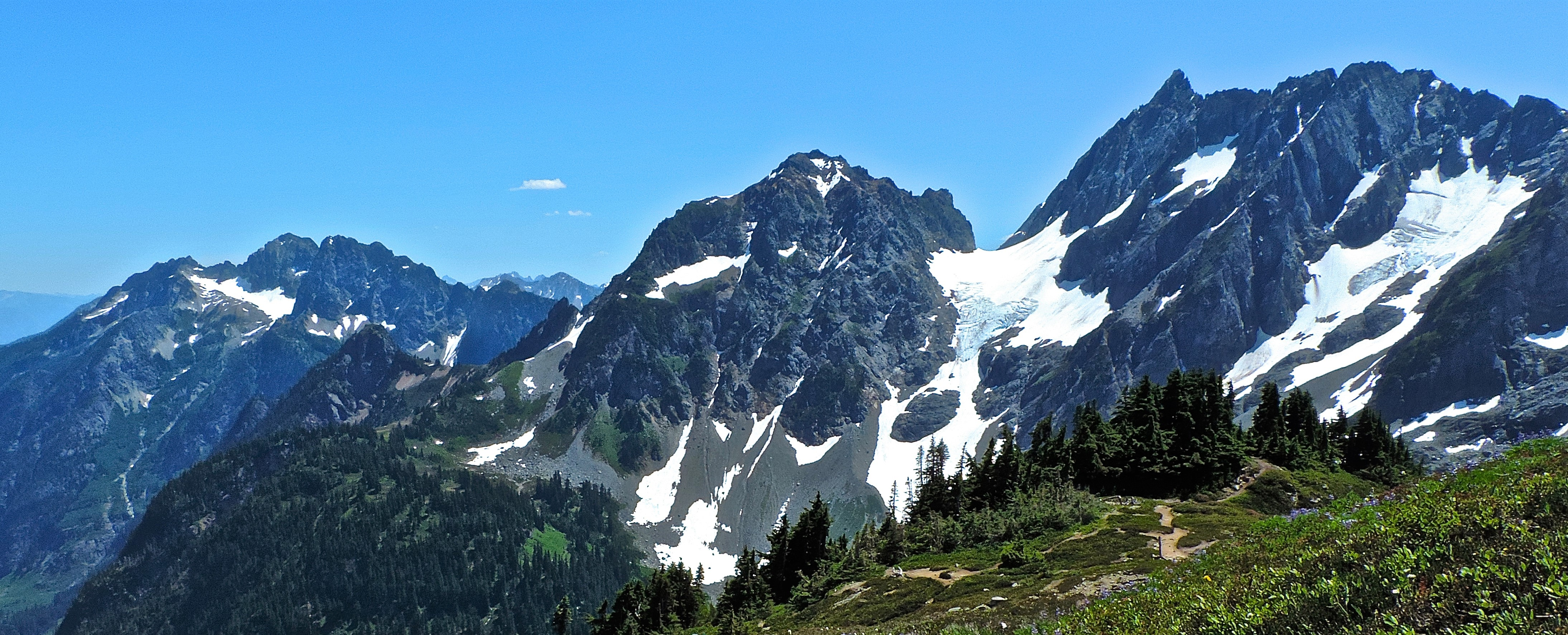
View from Sahale Arm with Pelton Peak centered, Glory Mountain (left), and Magic Mountain to right

== See also ==
- Geography of Washington (state)
- Geology of the Pacific Northwest
