= Glory Mountain =

Mountain in Washington (state), United States

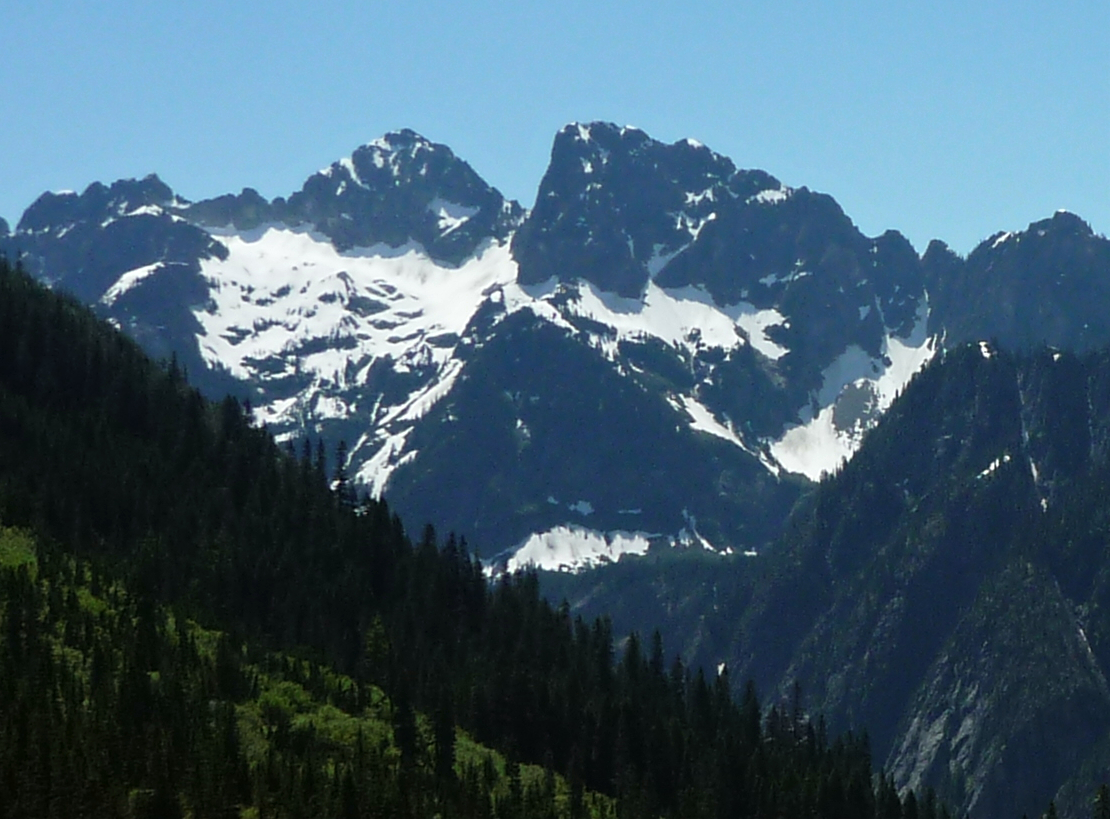
- Glory Mountain left, Halleluja Peak right

Highest point
- Elevation: 7,228 ft (2,203 m)
- Prominence: 1,348 ft (411 m)
- Parent peak: Trapper Mountain (7,530 ft)
- Isolation: 1.74 mi (2.80 km)
- Coordinates: 48°25′56″N 120°58′49″W

Geography
- Location within Washington (state) Location within the United States
- Interactive map of Glory Mountain
- Country: United States
- State: Washington
- County: Chelan
- Protected area: Glacier Peak Wilderness; North Cascades National Park
- Parent range: North Cascades
- Topo map: USGS Goode Mountain

Geology
- Rock type: Gneiss

Climbing
- Easiest route: class 4 scrambling

Glory Mountain is a 7,228-foot (2,203-metre) mountain summit located in the North Cascades Range in Chelan County of Washington state. Glory Mountain is situated southeast of Trapper Lake on the shared border of North Cascades National Park and Glacier Peak Wilderness. The nearest higher peak is Trapper Mountain, 1.72 miles (2.77 km) to the west. Precipitation runoff from the mountain drains into Cottonwood Creek and Flat Creek, both tributaries of the Stehekin River. An unofficially named secondary peak called Halleluja Peak 7,120+ ft (2,170+ m) lies 0.32 miles (0.51 km) to the west of the summit.

== Climate ==
Glory Mountain is located in the marine west coast climate zone of western North America. Weather fronts originating in the Pacific Ocean travel northeast toward the Cascade Mountains. As fronts approach the North Cascades, they are forced upward by the peaks of the Cascade Range, causing them to drop their moisture in the form of rain or snow onto the Cascades (Orographic lift). As a result, the west side of the North Cascades experiences high precipitation, especially during the winter months in the form of snowfall. During winter months, weather is usually cloudy, but due to high pressure systems over the Pacific Ocean that intensify during summer months, there is often little or no cloud cover during the summer.

== Geology ==
The North Cascades features some of the most rugged topography in the Cascade Range with craggy peaks and ridges, deep glacial valleys, and granite spires. Geological events occurring many years ago created the diverse topography and drastic elevation changes over the Cascade Range leading to the various climate differences. These climate differences lead to vegetation variety defining the ecoregions in this area.

The history of the formation of the Cascade Mountains dates back millions of years ago to the late Eocene Epoch. With the North American Plate overriding the Pacific Plate, episodes of volcanic igneous activity persisted. In addition, small fragments of the oceanic and continental lithosphere called terranes created the North Cascades about 50 million years ago.

During the Pleistocene period dating back over two million years ago, glaciation advancing and retreating repeatedly scoured the landscape leaving deposits of rock debris. The U-shaped cross section of the river valleys is a result of recent glaciation. Uplift and faulting in combination with glaciation have been the dominant processes which have created the tall peaks and deep valleys of the North Cascades area.

== Gallery ==
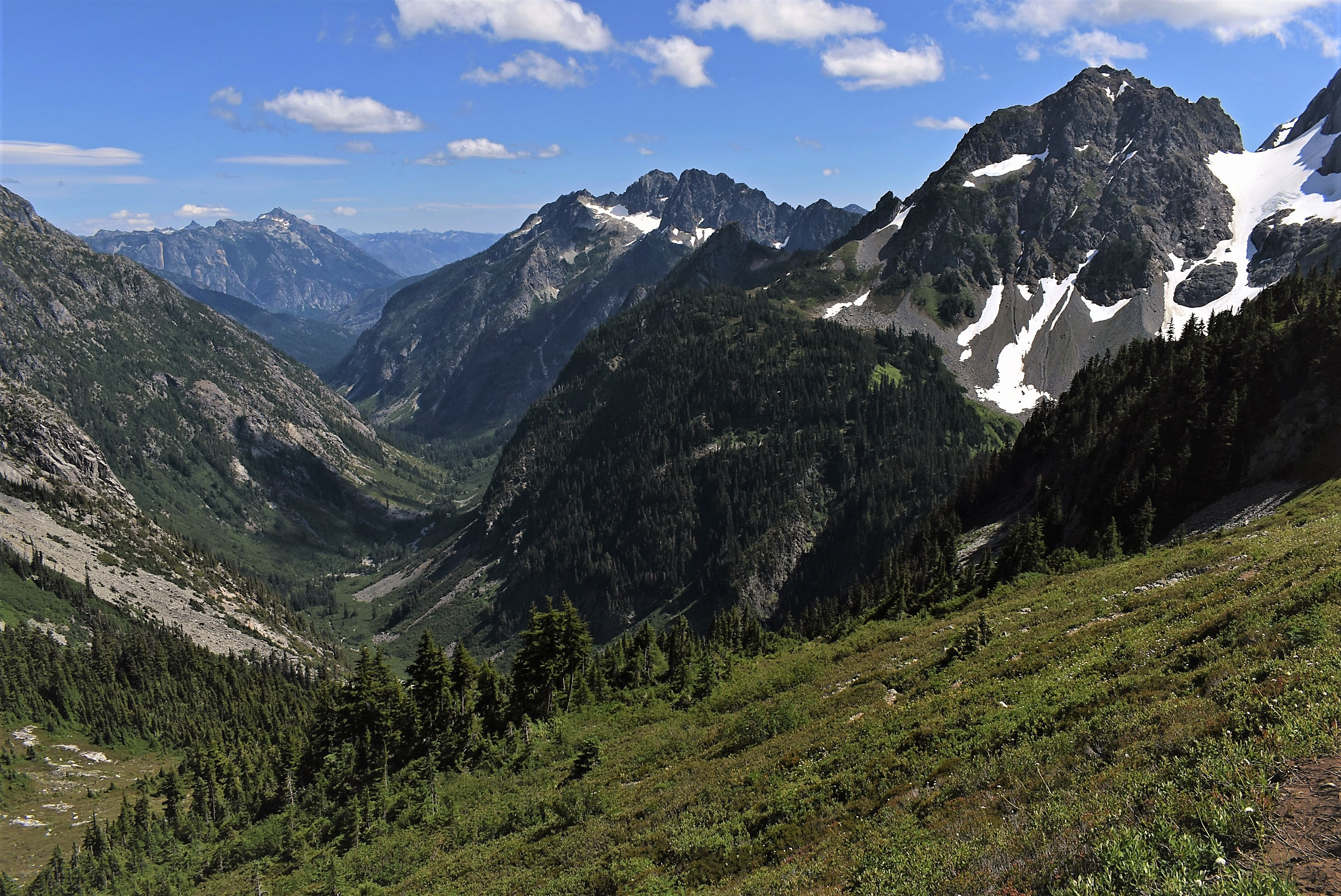
Glory Mountain (center) from Cascade Pass-Sahale Arm

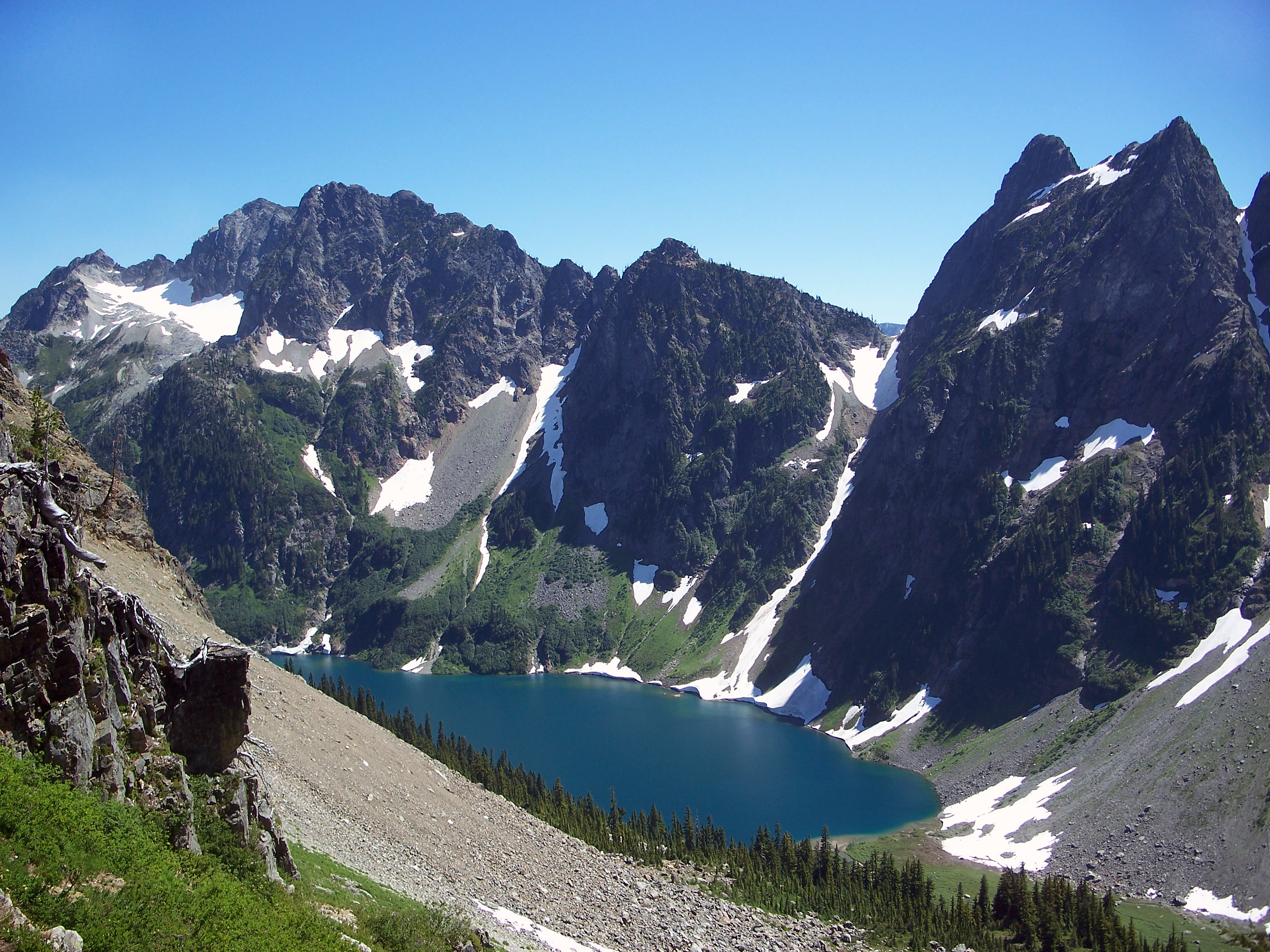
Glory Mountain (left) and Trapper Lake

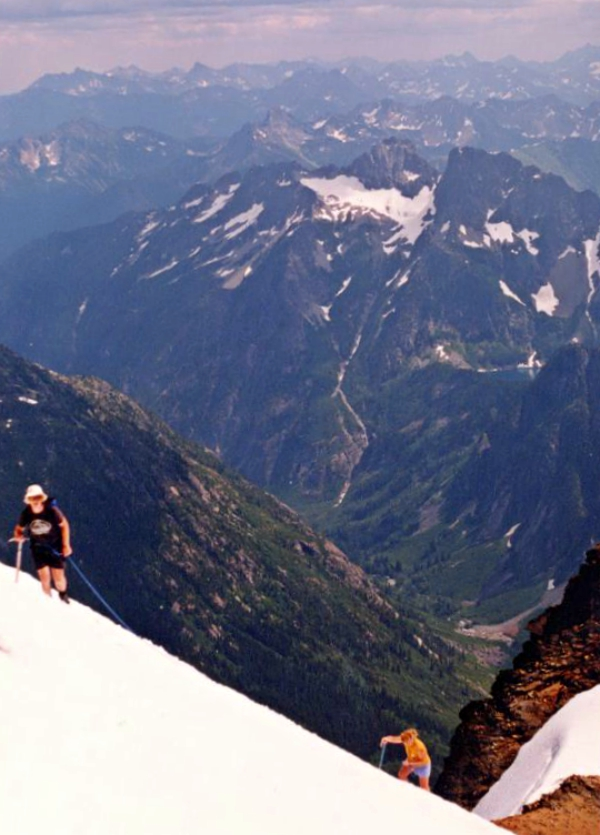
Glory Mountain seen from Sahale Peak

== See also ==
- Geography of the North Cascades
- Geology of the Pacific Northwest
