= Trapper Mountain =

Mountain in Washington (state), United States

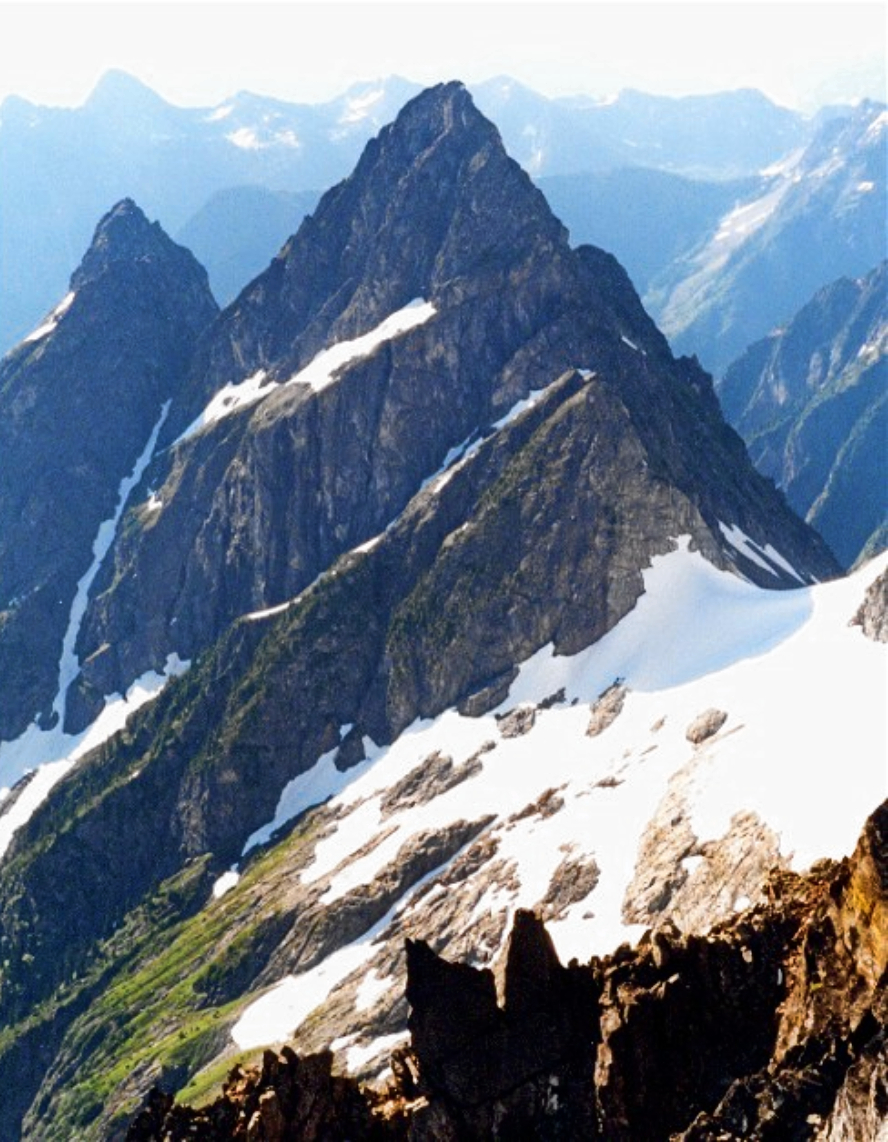
- Trapper Mountain seen from Magic Mountain

Highest point
- Elevation: 7,530 ft (2,295 m)
- Prominence: 1,170 ft (357 m)
- Parent peak: Hurry-up Peak (7,821 ft)
- Isolation: 0.92 mi (1.48 km)
- Coordinates: 48°25′54″N 121°01′05″W

Geography
- Location within Washington (state) Location within the United States
- Interactive map of Trapper Mountain
- Country: United States
- State: Washington
- County: Chelan
- Protected area: North Cascades National Park; Glacier Peak Wilderness
- Parent range: North Cascades; Cascade Range
- Topo map: USGS Cascade Pass

Climbing
- First ascent: 1949, George Bell, Andrew Griscom, Harry King, W V Graham Matthews
- Easiest route: class 3 scrambling

Trapper Mountain is a 7,530-foot (2,295-metre) summit located in Chelan County of Washington state. It is part of the North Cascades Range. Trapper Mountain is situated southeast of Cascade Pass on the shared border of North Cascades National Park and Glacier Peak Wilderness. The nearest higher peak is Hurry-up Peak, 0.92 miles (1.48 km) to the west. Surface runoff from the mountain drains into Trapper Lake and tributaries of the Stehekin River.

== Climate ==
Trapper Mountain is located in the marine west coast climate zone of western North America. Weather fronts coming inland from the Pacific Ocean travel northeast toward the Cascade Mountains. As fronts approach the North Cascades, they are forced upward by the peaks (orographic lift), causing them to drop their moisture in the form of rain or snow onto the Cascades. As a result, the North Cascades experience high precipitation, especially during the winter months in the form of snowfall. During winter months, weather is usually cloudy, but, due to high pressure systems over the Pacific Ocean that intensify during summer months, there is often little or no cloud cover during the summer. The months of July through September offer the most favorable weather for climbing or viewing this peak.

== Geology ==
The North Cascades features some of the most rugged topography in the Cascade Range with craggy peaks and ridges, deep glacial valleys, and granite spires. Geological events occurring many years ago created the diverse topography and drastic elevation changes over the Cascade Range leading to the various climate differences. These climate differences lead to vegetation variety defining the ecoregions in this area.

The history of the formation of the Cascade Mountains dates back millions of years ago to the late Eocene Epoch. With the North American Plate overriding the Pacific Plate, episodes of volcanic igneous activity persisted. In addition, small fragments of the oceanic and continental lithosphere called terranes created the North Cascades about 50 million years ago.

During the Pleistocene period dating back over two million years ago, glaciation advancing and retreating repeatedly scoured the landscape leaving deposits of rock debris. The U-shaped cross section of the river valleys is a result of recent glaciation. Uplift and faulting in combination with glaciation have been the dominant processes which have created the tall peaks and deep valleys of the North Cascades area.

== Gallery ==
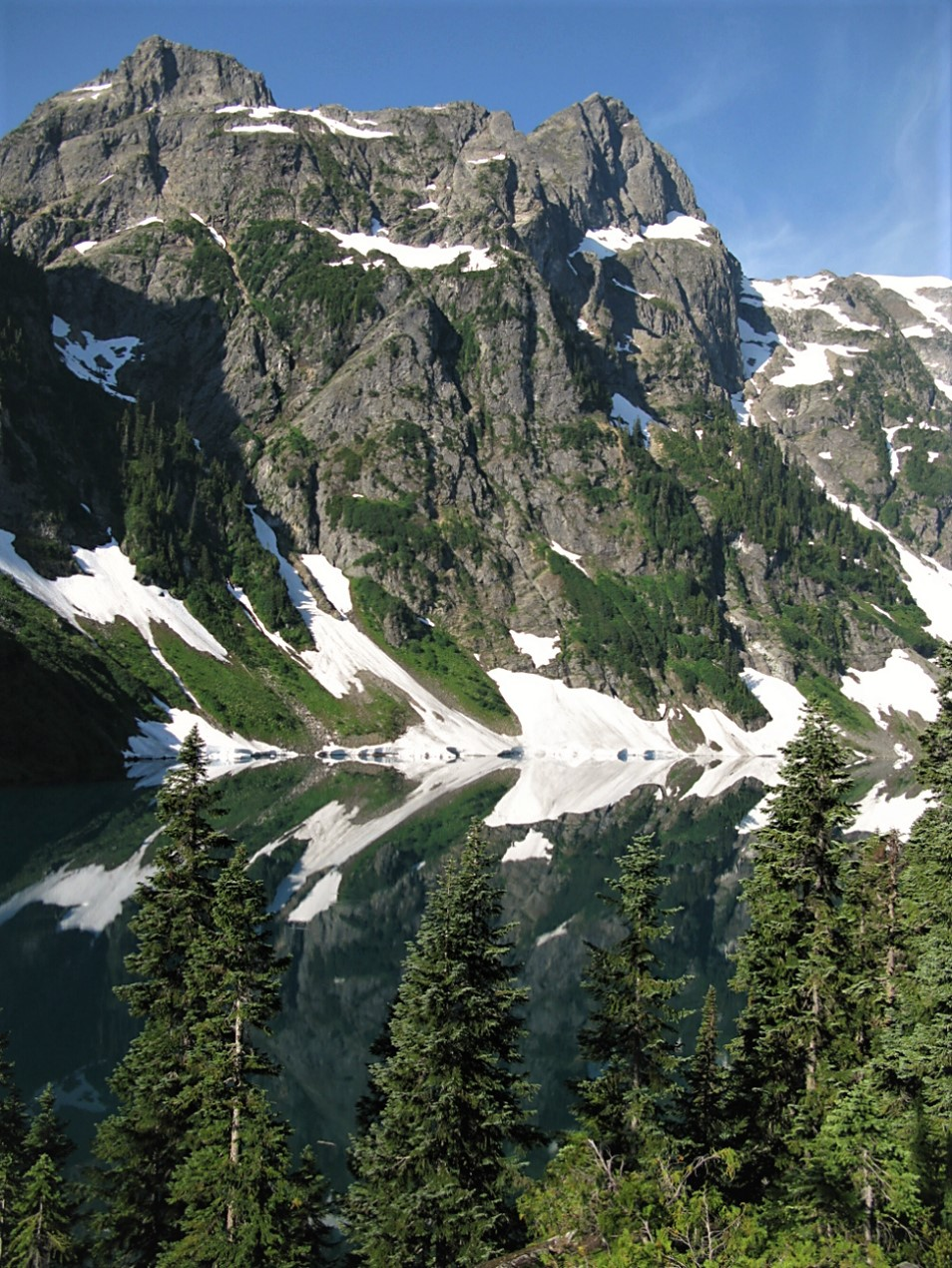
Trapper Mountain, Trapper Lake from the northeast

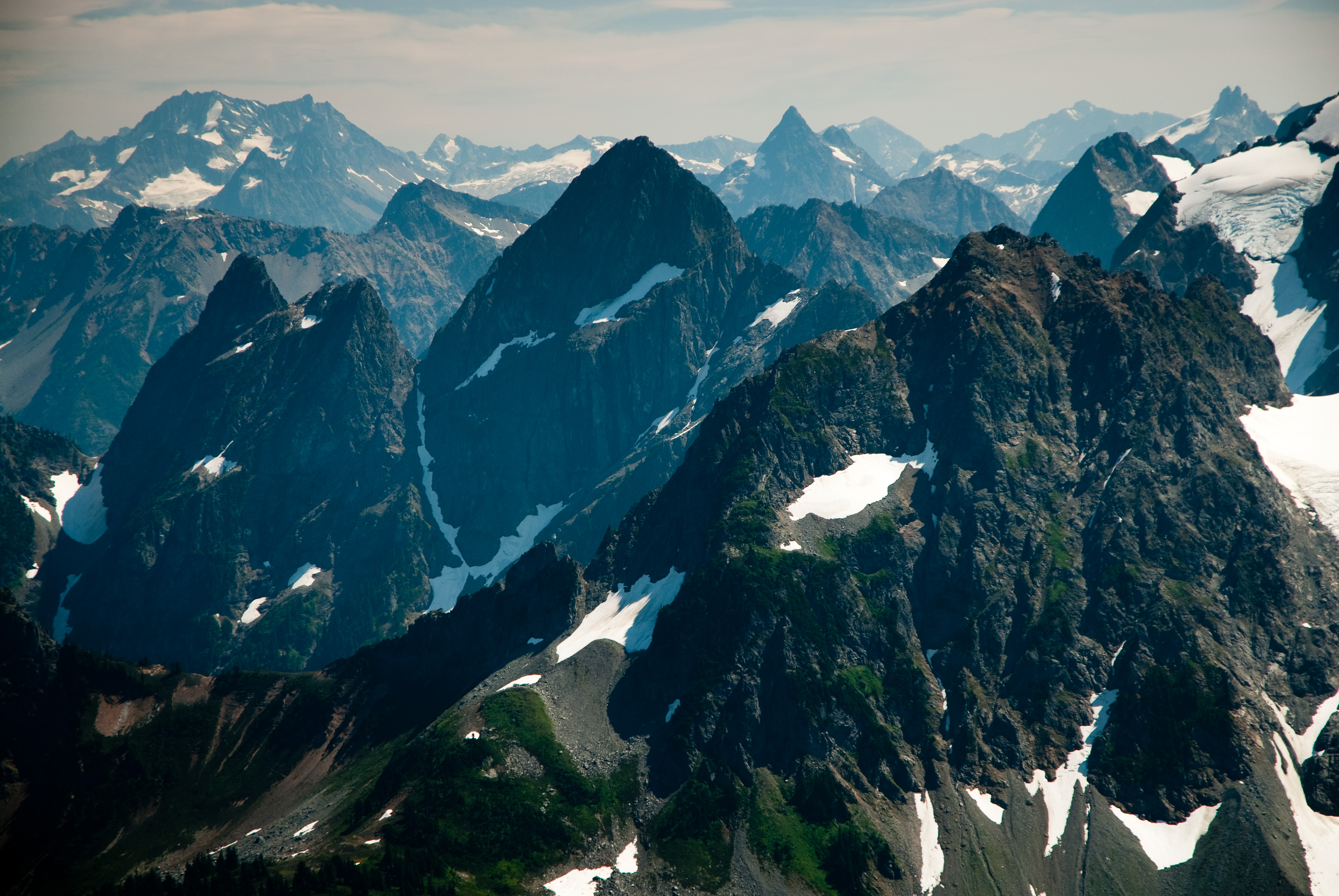
Trapper Mountain centered as seen from Sahale Mountain

== See also ==
- Geology of the Pacific Northwest
- Geography of the North Cascades
