= Trapper Peak =

Trapper Peak may refer to:

- Trapper Peak (Canada), a mountain in the Waputik Range, on the border between Alberta and British Columbia
- Trapper Peak (Montana), a mountain in the Selway-Bitterroot Wilderness Area

== See also ==
- Trapper Mountain, Washington, United States
- Trappers Peak, Washington, United States
