= Trapper Lake (Chelan County, Washington) =

- Location within Washington (state) Location within the United States

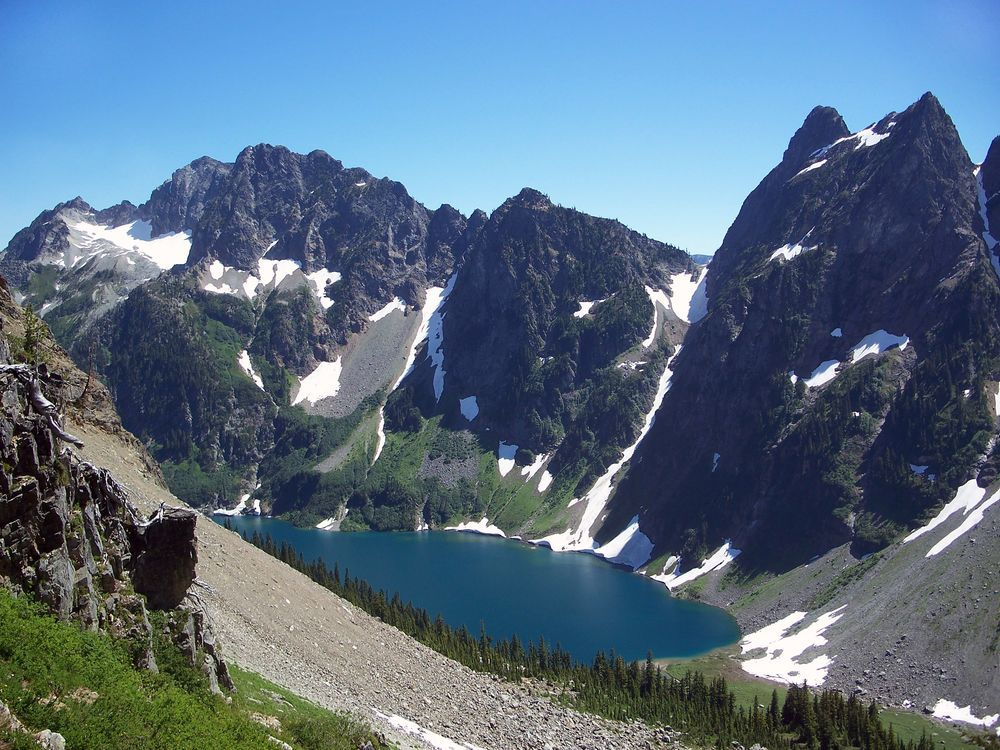
- Location: North Cascades National Park, Chelan County, Washington, United States
- Coordinates: 48°26′24″N 121°00′13″W
- Type: Glacial Lake
- Primary inflows: S Glacier
- Primary outflows: Cottonwood Creek
- Basin countries: United States
- Max. length: .85 mi (1.37 km)
- Max. width: .35 mi (0.56 km)
- Surface elevation: 4,170 ft (1,270 m)

Trapper Lake is located in North Cascades National Park, in the U. S. state of Washington. Trapper Lake is situated just northeast of Trapper Mountain and is not on a designated trail. The lake is accessible after a steep climb from the Upper Stehekin River Trail. The lake is fed by meltwater from the S Glacier on Hurry-up Peak, as well as runoff from Magic Mountain and Pelton Peak.
