= Mix-up Peak =

Mountain in Washington (state), United States

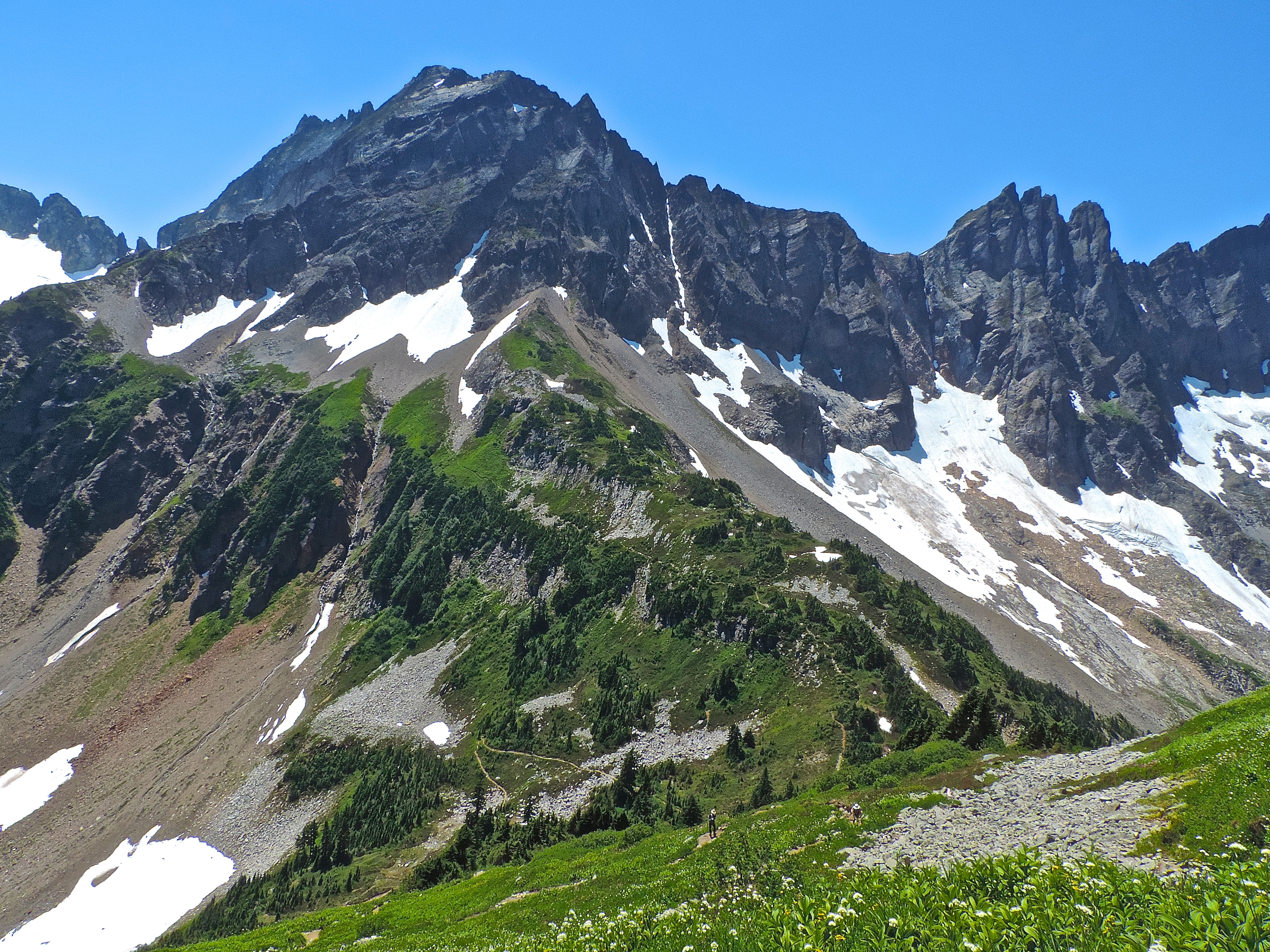
- Mix-up Peak seen from Sahale Arm Trail

Highest point
- Elevation: 7,440 ft (2,270 m)
- Prominence: 640 ft (200 m)
- Parent peak: Magic Mountain
- Isolation: 1.03 mi (1.66 km)
- Coordinates: 48°27′14″N 121°03′37″W

Geography
- Location within Washington (state) Location within the United States
- Interactive map of Mix-up Peak
- Country: United States
- State: Washington
- County: Chelan / Skagit
- Protected area: Glacier Peak Wilderness
- Parent range: North Cascades
- Topo map: USGS Cascade Pass

Climbing
- First ascent: 1947, Wesley Grande, Jack Kendrick
- Easiest route: Glacier travel, class 4 scrambling

Mix-up Peak, also known as Mixup Peak, is a 7,440-foot (2,270-metre) mountain summit located on the shared boundary of Skagit County and Chelan County in Washington state. It is part of the North Cascades Range and is situated one mile south of Cascade Pass on the shared border of North Cascades National Park and Glacier Peak Wilderness. The nearest higher peak is Magic Mountain, 1.02 miles (1.64 km) to the east-southeast. Mix-up Peak is at the northern end of the Ptarmigan Traverse which is an alpine route to remote mountains such as Mount Formidable and Dome Peak. The Cache Glacier occupies a cirque below its eastern flank. Surface runoff on the east side the mountain drains into the Stehekin River, whereas precipitation runoff drains into the Cascade River from the west side.

== Climate ==
Mix-up Peak is located in the marine west coast climate zone of western North America. Most weather fronts coming off the Pacific Ocean travel northeast toward the Cascade Mountains. As fronts approach the North Cascades, they are forced upward by the peaks of the Cascade Range (orographic lift), causing them to drop their moisture in the form of rain or snow onto the Cascades. As a result, the west side of the North Cascades experiences high precipitation, especially during the winter months in the form of snowfall. Because of maritime influence, snow tends to be wet and heavy, resulting in high avalanche danger. During winter months, weather is usually cloudy, but due to high pressure systems over the Pacific Ocean that intensify during summer months, there is often little or no cloud cover during the summer.

== Geology ==
The North Cascades features some of the most rugged topography in the Cascade Range with craggy peaks and ridges and deep glacial valleys. Geological events occurring many years ago created the diverse topography and drastic elevation changes over the Cascade Range leading to the various climate differences. These climate differences lead to vegetation variety defining the ecoregions in this area.

The history of the formation of the Cascade Mountains dates back millions of years ago to the late Eocene Epoch. With the North American Plate overriding the Pacific Plate, episodes of volcanic igneous activity persisted. In addition, small fragments of the oceanic and continental lithosphere called terranes created the North Cascades about 50 million years ago.

During the Pleistocene period dating back over two million years ago, glaciation advancing and retreating repeatedly scoured the landscape leaving deposits of rock debris. The U-shaped cross section of the river valleys is a result of recent glaciation. Uplift and faulting in combination with glaciation have been the dominant processes which have created the tall peaks and deep valleys of the North Cascades area.

== Gallery ==
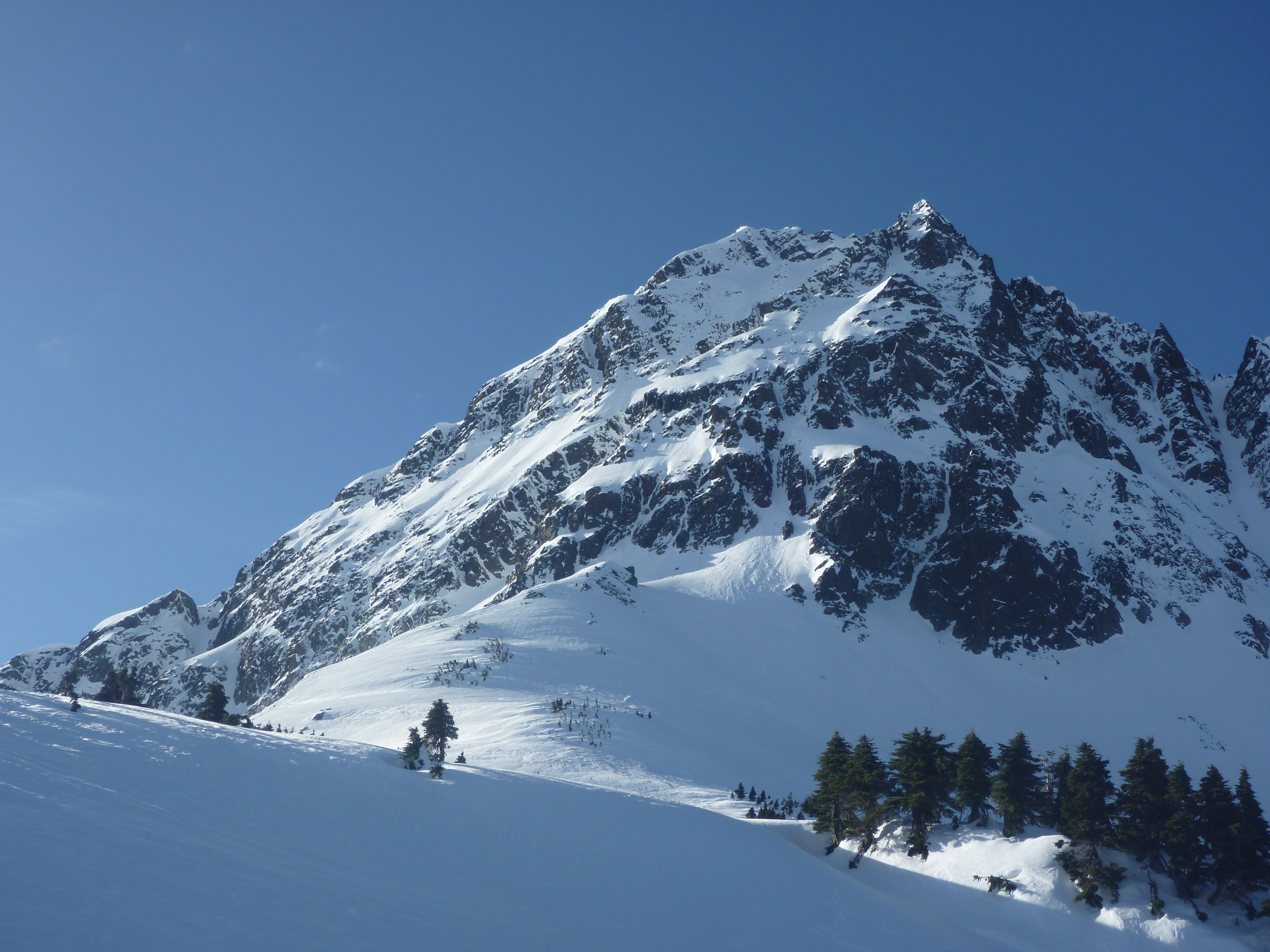
Mix-up Peak in winter

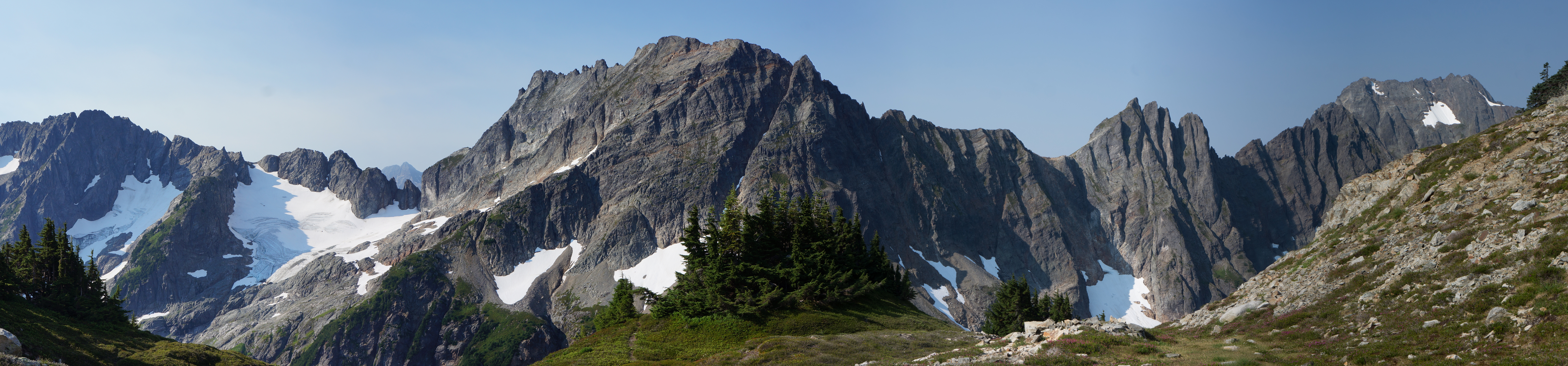
Mix-up Peak from Sahale Arm

== See also ==
- Geography of Washington (state)
- Geology of the Pacific Northwest
