= S Glacier =

Glacier in Washington, United States

- The S Glacier (center, above Trapper Lake) in 1963

- Location within Washington (state)
- Type: Mountain glacier
- Location: Chelan County, Washington, U.S.
- Coordinates: 48°26′28″N 121°01′24″W
- Length: .70 mi (1.13 km)
- Terminus: Barren rock and icefall
- Status: Retreating

S Glacier is in North Cascades National Park in the U.S. state of Washington, on the east slopes of Hurry-up Peak. S Glacier is disconnected in several spots. The uppermost sections terminate in icefalls, while the lower section ends in talus. Total descent of the glacier is from 7,600 to 5,500 ft (2,300 to 1,700 m). Yawning Glacier lies .75 mi (1.21 km) to the north.

== See also ==
- List of glaciers in the United States
