= Ptarmigan Traverse =

Alpine climbing route in the North Cascades in Washington, United States

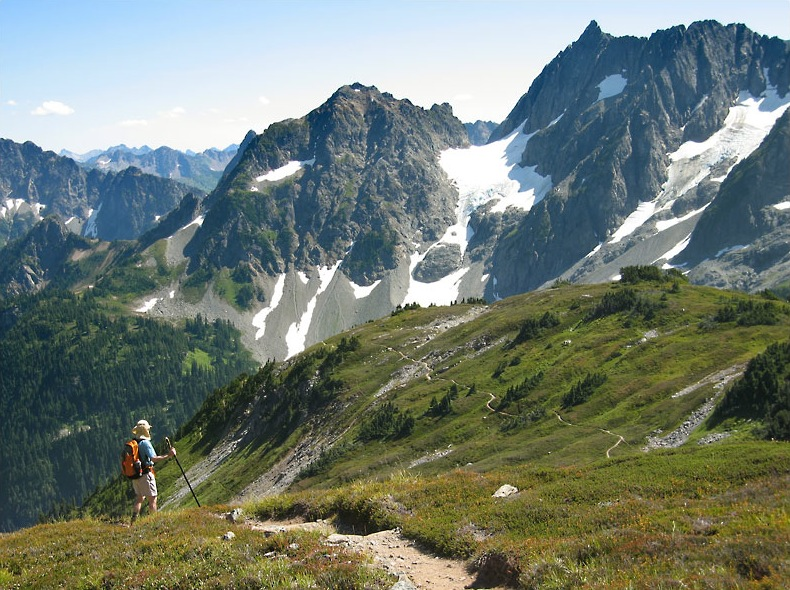
View from Cascade Pass, at the northern end of the traverse. Beyond Cascade Pass the route is a challenging, trail-less mountaineering endeavor.

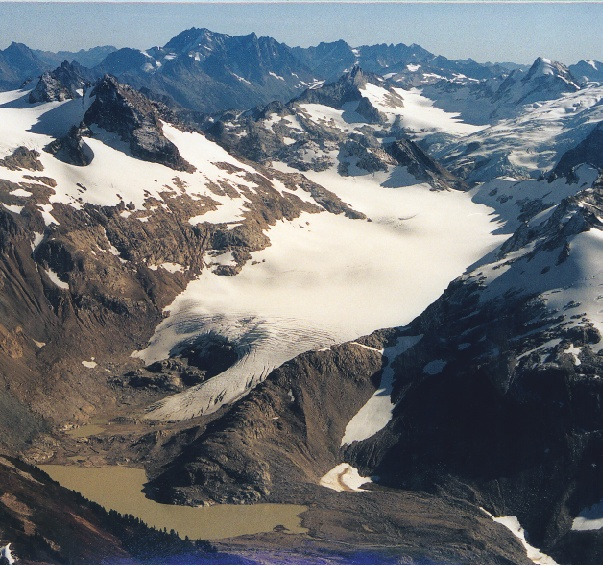
A portion of the southern Ptarmigan Traverse, looking east: route climbs the LeConte Glacier (left edge of photo), traverses around the west side of Sentinel Peak (dark pyramidal peak, left-center), descends to the South Cascade Glacier (center), ascends to ridge at top of the glacier (right-center), and crosses over to the White Rock Lakes.

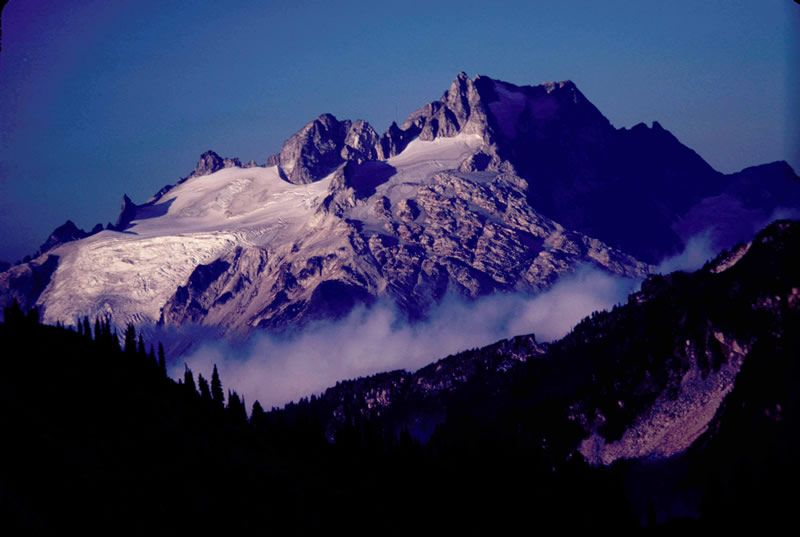
Dome Peak at the southern end of the traverse

Ptarmigan Traverse is an alpine climbing route in the North Cascades of Washington state. The route, from Cascade Pass to Dome Peak, is generally remote, unmarked, and challenging, traversing rugged terrain and several glaciers.

== History ==
The first traverse took 13 days in July 1938. The group consisted of four members of the Ptarmigan Climbing Club: Bill Cox, Calder Bressler, Ray W. Clough, and Tom Myers. The second traverse was in 1953 and consisted of Dale Cole, Bob Grant, Mike Hane, Erick Karlsson and Tom Miller. Miller took high-quality photos of the peaks, valleys, glaciers, and lakes, which were later published in a book by The Mountaineers. The book, called The North Cascades, was published in 1964 and proved instrumental in the bid to create the North Cascades National Park.

The route is named after an alpine bird, the rock ptarmigan. The "p" is silent and is pronounced "TAR-mig-an".

The third successful traverse of the route was made in 1958 by a party led by photographer Ira Spring, with Coleman Leuthy, Ray and Marge McConnell, Peggy Stark and Russell Bockman. The trip was described in an article published in The Saturday Evening Post that was illustrated with Spring's stunning photos of the trip. Today the route is a common goal of Cascade Range mountaineers.

== Route ==
Place names are listed from north to south:

=== Cascade Pass area ===
- Buckner Mountain (9,091 feet (2,771 m)) –
- Boston Peak (8,845 feet (2,696 m)) –
- Sahale Peak (8,680 feet (2,650 m)) –
- Cascade Pass (5,351 feet (1,631 m)) – - last improved trail
- Mixup Peak (7,440 feet (2,270 m)) –
- Cache Col (6,903 feet (2,104 m)) – - boundary between North Cascades National Park and Glacier Peak Wilderness
- Magic Mountain (7,618 feet (2,322 m)) –
- Pelton Peak (7,132 feet (2,174 m)) –

=== Middle Cascade area ===
- Hurry-up Peak (7,818 feet (2,383 m)) –
- Middle Cascade Glacier (5,748 feet (1,752 m)) –
- Mount Formidable (8,340 feet (2,540 m)) –
- Spider Mountain (8,291 feet (2,527 m)) –

=== South Cascade area ===
- Le Conte Mountain (7,739 feet (2,359 m)) –
- LeConte Glacier (7,434 feet (2,266 m)) –
- Sentinel Peak (8,205 feet (2,501 m)) –
- South Cascade Glacier (6,138 feet (1,871 m)) – - largest glacier on route after Chickamin Glacier on Dome Peak
- White Rock Lakes (6,197 feet (1,889 m)) –

=== Dome area ===
- Dana Glacier (6,735 feet (2,053 m)) –
- Spire Point (8,146 feet (2,483 m)) –
- Dome Peak (8,852 feet (2,698 m)) –
