= Spider Mountain =

Mountain in Washington (state), United States

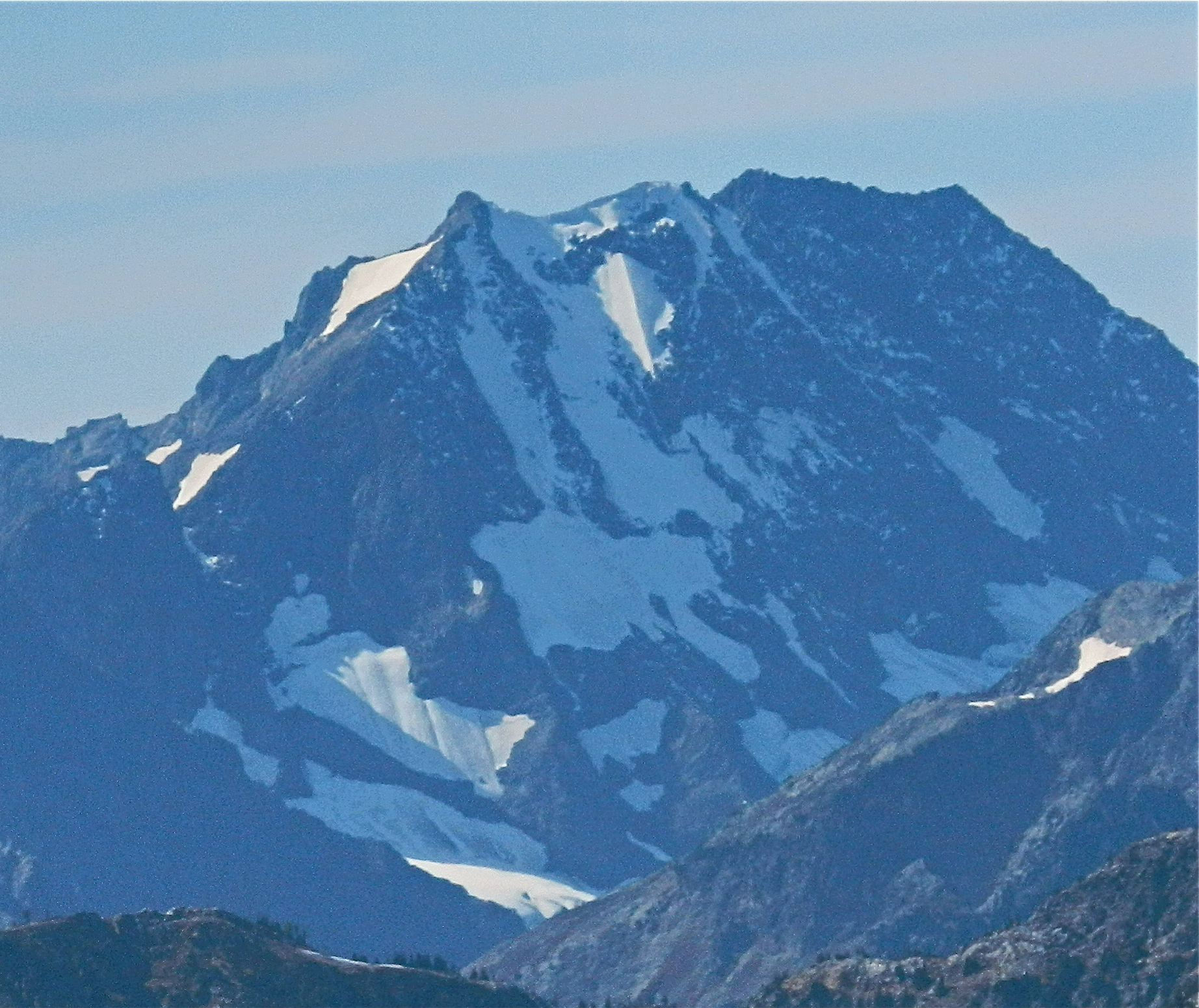
- Spider Mountain from Maple Pass

Highest point
- Elevation: 8,317 ft (2,535 m)
- Prominence: 970 ft (296 m)
- Parent peak: Mount Formidable
- Isolation: 1.33 mi (2.14 km)
- Coordinates: 48°24′34″N 121°02′10″W

Geography
- Location within Washington (state) Location within the United States
- Interactive map of Spider Mountain
- Country: United States
- State: Washington
- County: Chelan
- Protected area: Glacier Peak Wilderness
- Parent range: North Cascades; Cascade Range
- Topo map: USGS Cascade Pass

Geology
- Rock type: Schist

Climbing
- First ascent: 1938, Calder Bressler, Ralph Clough, Bill Cox, Tom Myers
- Easiest route: Scrambling Glacier travel

Spider Mountain is an 8,317-foot (2,535-metre) mountain summit located in the Glacier Peak Wilderness in western Chelan County of Washington state. It is part of the North Cascades, which is a subset of the Cascade Range. Meltwater from the Spider Glacier on the steep north face, and other surface runoff from the mountain drains into Flat Creek, which is a tributary of the Stehekin River. Topographic relief is significant as the summit rises 4,200 feet (1,300 meters) above West Fork Flat Creek in one mile (1.6 km). The nearest higher neighbor is Mount Formidable 1.5 miles (2.4 km) to the west. The Middle Cascade Glacier lies between these two mountains and the Ptarmigan Traverse passes between the two.

== Climate ==
Spider Mountain is located in the marine west coast climate zone of western North America. Weather fronts coming inland from the Pacific Ocean travel northeast toward the Cascade Mountains. As fronts approach the North Cascades, they are forced upward by the peaks (orographic lift), causing them to drop their moisture in the form of rain or snow onto the Cascades. As a result, the North Cascades experience high precipitation, especially during the winter months in the form of snowfall. During winter months, weather is usually cloudy, but, due to high pressure systems over the Pacific Ocean that intensify during summer months, there is often little or no cloud cover during the summer. The months of July through September offer the most favorable weather for climbing or viewing this peak.

== Geology ==
The North Cascades features some of the most rugged topography in the Cascade Range with craggy peaks and ridges, deep glacial valleys, and granite spires. Geological events occurring many years ago created the diverse topography and drastic elevation changes over the Cascade Range leading to various climate differences.

The history of the formation of the Cascade Mountains dates back millions of years ago to the late Eocene Epoch. With the North American Plate overriding the Pacific Plate, episodes of volcanic igneous activity persisted. In addition, small fragments of the oceanic and continental lithosphere called terranes created the North Cascades about 50 million years ago.

During the Pleistocene period dating back over two million years ago, glaciation advancing and retreating repeatedly scoured the landscape leaving deposits of rock debris. The U-shaped cross section of the river valleys is a result of recent glaciation. Uplift and faulting in combination with glaciation have been the dominant processes which have created the tall peaks and deep valleys of the North Cascades area.

== Gallery ==
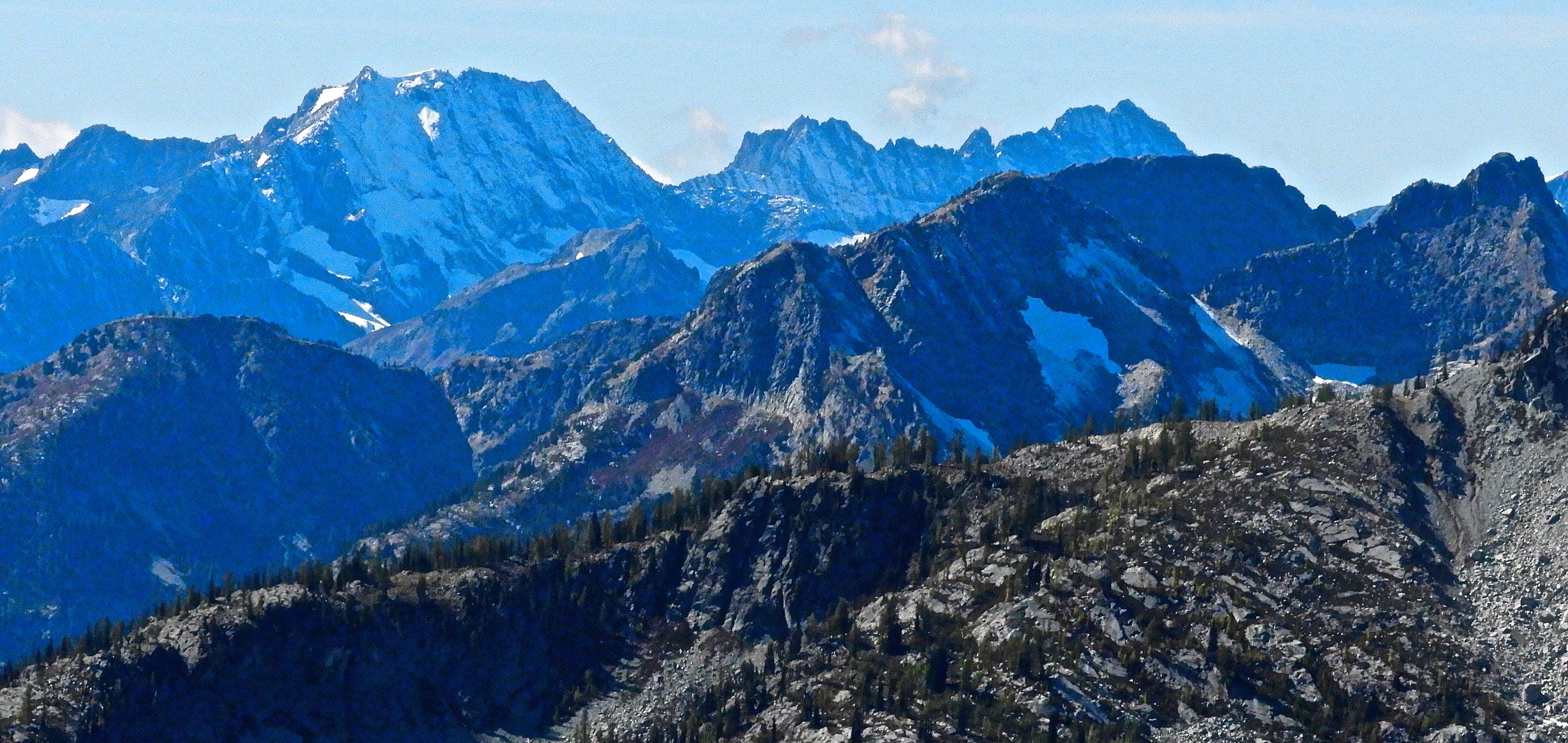
Spider Mountain in upper left

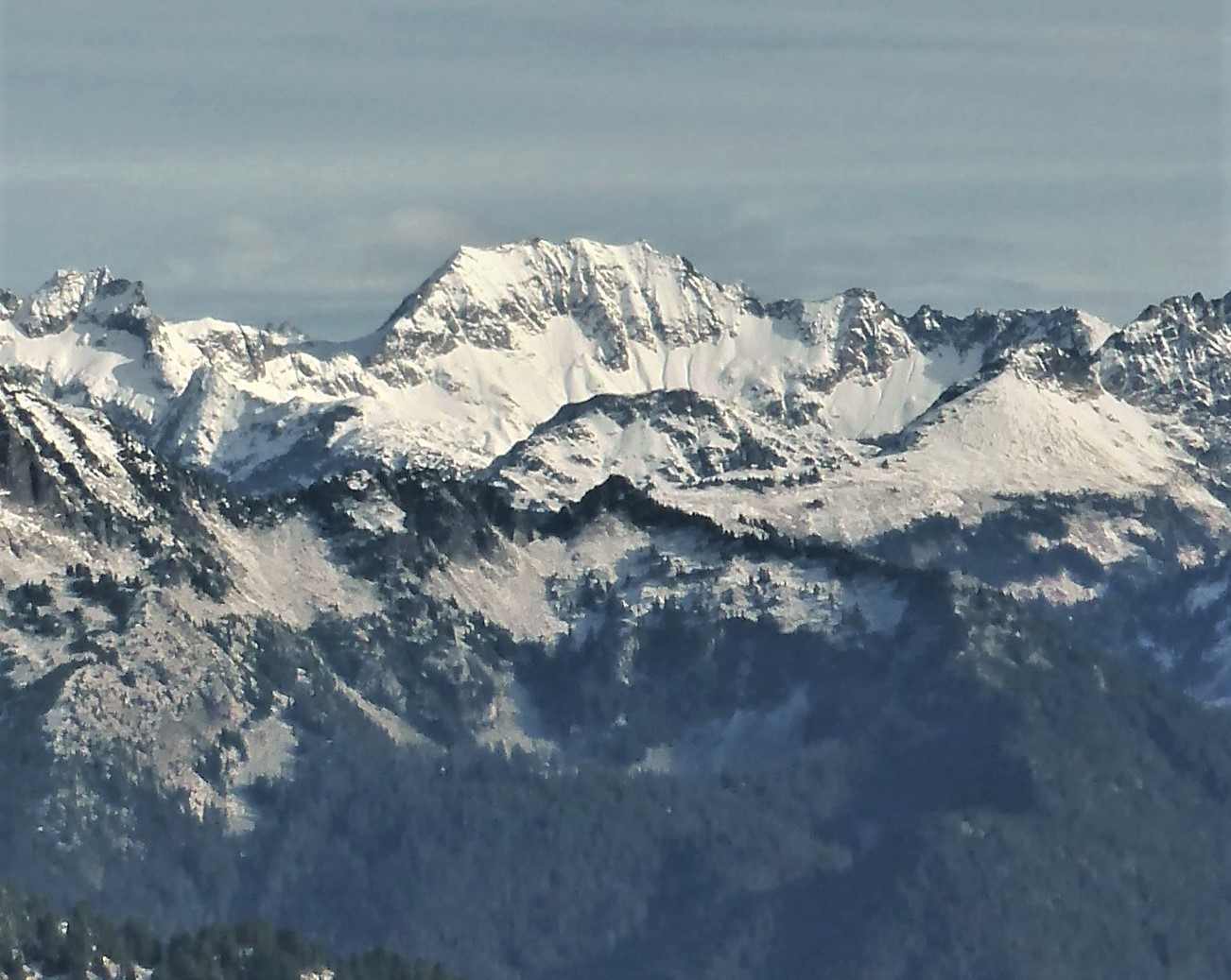
Southwest aspect seen from Green Mountain

== See also ==
- Geography of the North Cascades
- Geology of the Pacific Northwest
- List of highest mountain peaks in Washington
