= Yawning Glacier =

Glacier in United States

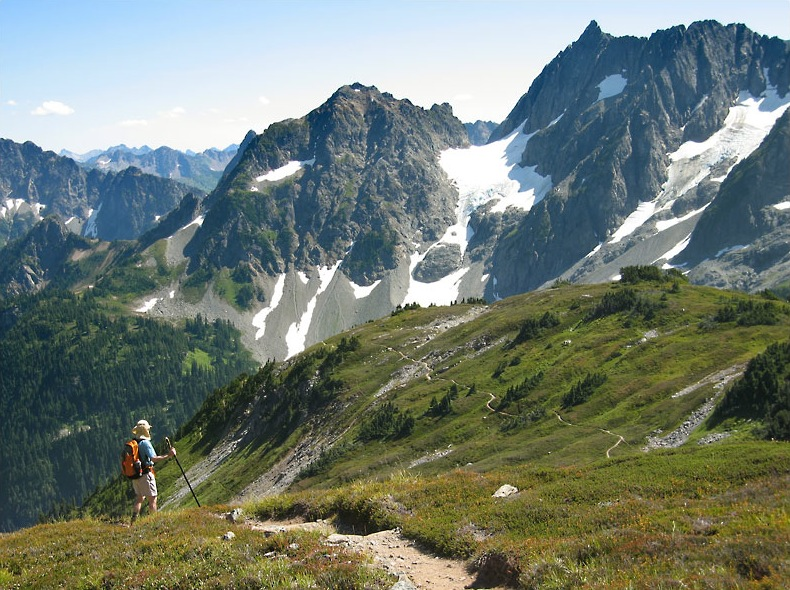
- Yawning Glacier at center from Cascade Pass

- Location within Washington (state)
- Type: Mountain glacier
- Location: Chelan County, Washington, U.S.
- Coordinates: 48°26′59″N 121°02′21″W
- Length: .25 mi (0.40 km)
- Terminus: Barren rock and icefall
- Status: Retreating

Yawning Glacier is in North Cascades National Park in the U.S. state of Washington, on the east slopes of Magic Mountain. Yawning Glacier descends from 6,800 to 6,200 ft (2,100 to 1,900 m). S Glacier lies .75 mi (1.21 km) to the south, and Cache Col Glacier is 1 mi (1.6 km) to the northwest.

== See also ==
- List of glaciers in the United States
