= Cache Col Glacier =

Glacier in Washington, United States

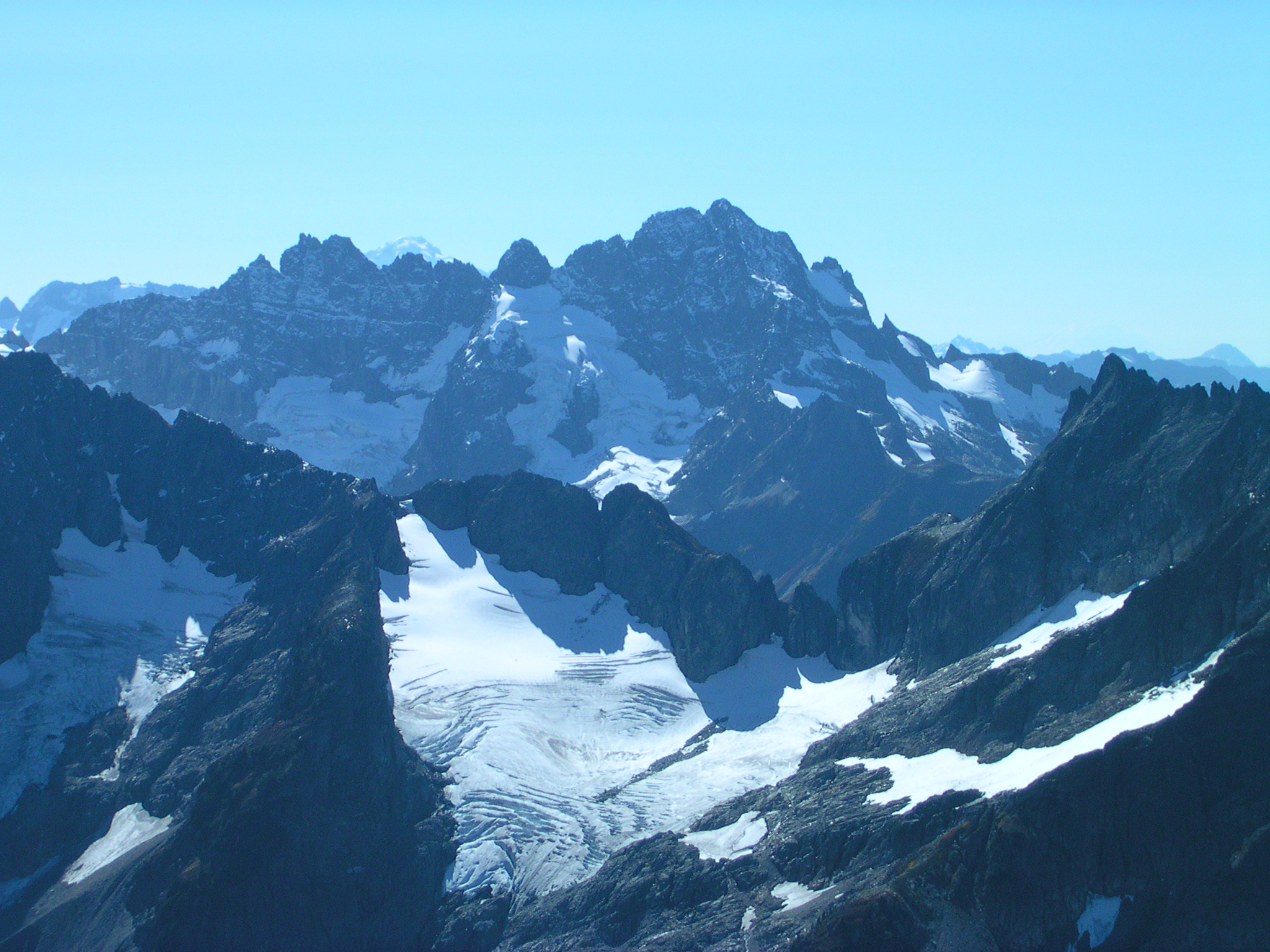
- The Cache Col Glacier as seen from Sahale arm. Mount Formidable is in the background

- Location within Washington (state)
- Type: Mountain glacier
- Location: Chelan County, Washington, U.S.
- Coordinates: 48°26′54″N 121°03′10″W
- Length: .50 mi (0.80 km)
- Terminus: Barren
- Status: Retreating

Cache Col Glacier is in North Cascades National Park in the U.S. state of Washington, on the east slope of Mix-up Peak. Cache Col Glacier retreated nearly 100 m (330 ft) between 1950 and 2005. Cache Col Glacier is 1 mi (1.6 km) northwest of Yawning Glacier.

== See also ==
- List of glaciers in the United States
