= Mount Formidable =

Mountain in United States

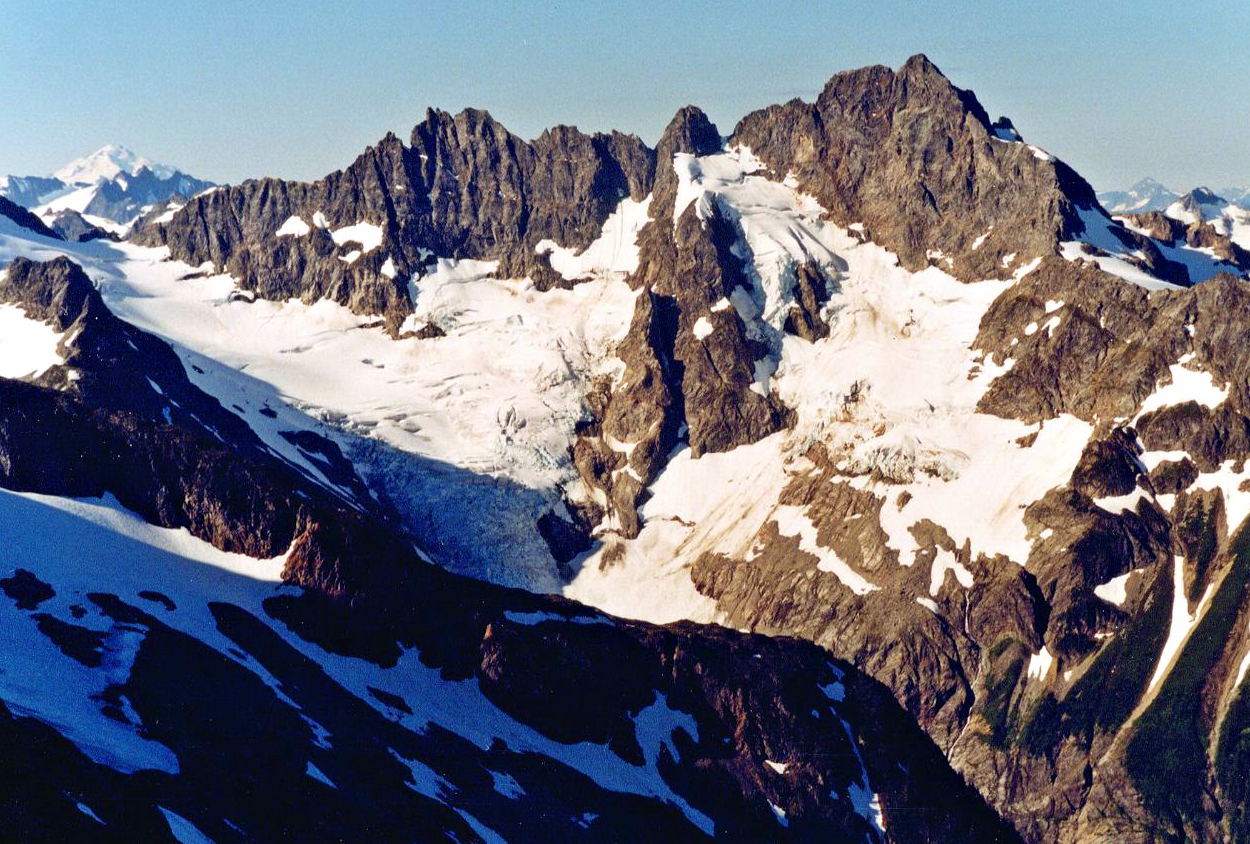
- Mount Formidable

Highest point
- Elevation: 8,325 feet (2,537 m)
- Prominence: 1,885 feet (575 m)
- Parent peak: Overdrive Tower
- Coordinates: 48°24′59″N 121°4′2″W

Geography
- Location within Washington (state)
- Location: Skagit County, Washington, United States
- Parent range: North Cascades
- Topo map: USGS Cascade Pass

Geology
- Rock age: Triassic
- Mountain type: Fold

Climbing
- First ascent: Calder T. Bressler; Ralph W. Clough; Bill Cox; Tom Myers
- Easiest route: Class III

Mount Formidable is a mountain in the North Cascades of Skagit County, in Washington state. Its first ascent was undertaken by members of the original Ptarmigan Traverse. It was named by early mountaineer Herman Ulrichs in 1935 because of the rugged appearance of its north face. The peak can be accessed from Cascade Pass via the Ptarmigan Traverse.

== Geography and climate ==
Mount Formidable is located on a spur ridge about half a mile west of the Cascade crest, between Cascade Pass and Dome Peak, and about a mile west of Spider Mountain. It is within the Marine west coast climatic zone, and experiences heavy snowfall as a result. The surrounding area is part of the Pacific temperate rainforests ecoregion, and lower elevations are densely vegetated. The Middle Cascade Glacier, which drains into the Skagit River via the Cascade River, is on the north side of the mountain.

== Geology ==
The North Cascades are composed of terranes, or scattered, unrelated rock groups of various ages. More specifically, the immediate area surrounding Mount Formidable (i.e., within ten miles), is mainly composed of granitic rocks that are Mesozoic in age, and schist that dates from the late paleozoic. Mount Formidable itself is likely composed of originally igneous rocks that formed in the Triassic and were metamorphorphized in the Late Cretaceous.

== Climbing ==
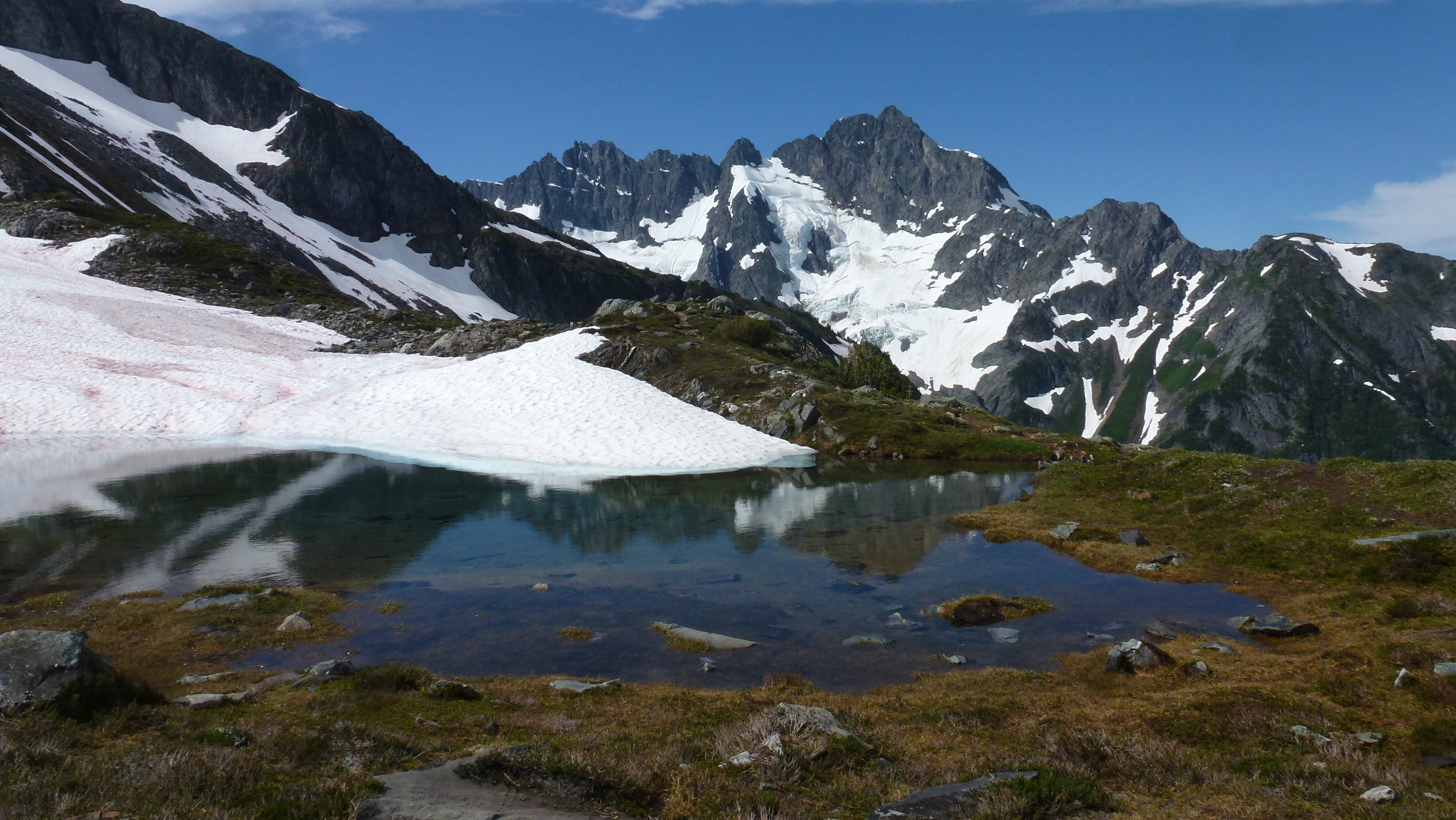
Mount Formidable from Kool-Aid Lake

Mount Formidable can be accessed via the Ptarmigan Traverse, which begins at Cascade Pass. Climbers access the higher elevations of the Middle Fork Cascade River basin via Cache Col and proceed to the summit via the Middle Cascade Glacier.
