= Cascade Pass =

Mountain pass in Washington

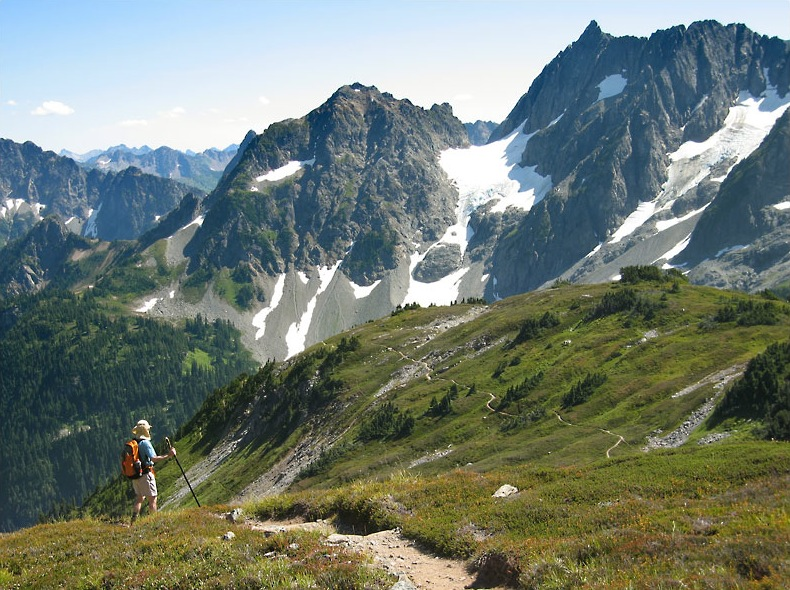
- Sahale Arm north of Cascade Pass, looking towards Pelton Peak, Yawning Glacier and Magic Mountain
- Interactive map of Cascade Pass
- Elevation: 5,392 feet (1,643 m)
- Traversed by: Cascade Pass Trail

Third Approach
- Location: Chelan / Skagit counties, Washington, United States
- Range: Cascades
- Coordinates: 48°28.1′N 121°3.6′W

Cascade Pass (formerly also known as Skagit Pass) is a 5,392-foot (1,643 m) mountain pass over the northern Cascade Range, east of Marblemount, Washington, U.S.

Although an important pass, providing the easiest connection from the Cascade River to the head of Lake Chelan, it is now inside North Cascades National Park, and crossed by only a hiking trail.

From the west, one reaches it by hiking an easy 3.5 mile trail from the end of the Cascade River Road (elev. 3,600 feet (1,100 m)). From the east, it is accessible via a trail from Stehekin up the Stehekin River valley.

The summit of the pass, being at the tree line, is known for its views in all directions. It is also a key departure point for mountaineering; to the north, the gentle ridge of the Sahale arm leads up Sahale Mountain to the summit, as well as to the meadows of Boston Basin and the summits above. To the south, Mixup Arm leads to Mixup Peak and Magic Mountain, as well as to Cache Col, making Cascade Pass the start of the high-level Ptarmigan Traverse.

The pass was originally a major route for Native Americans trading between the coast and the interior. Among the first white men to explore and map the Skagit Pass was New York newspaperman Frank Wilkeson. Alexander Ross probably crossed the Cascades via Cascade Pass in 1814. His writings are too vague to be certain about his precise route.
