= Magic Mountain (Washington) =

Mountain in Washington (state), United States

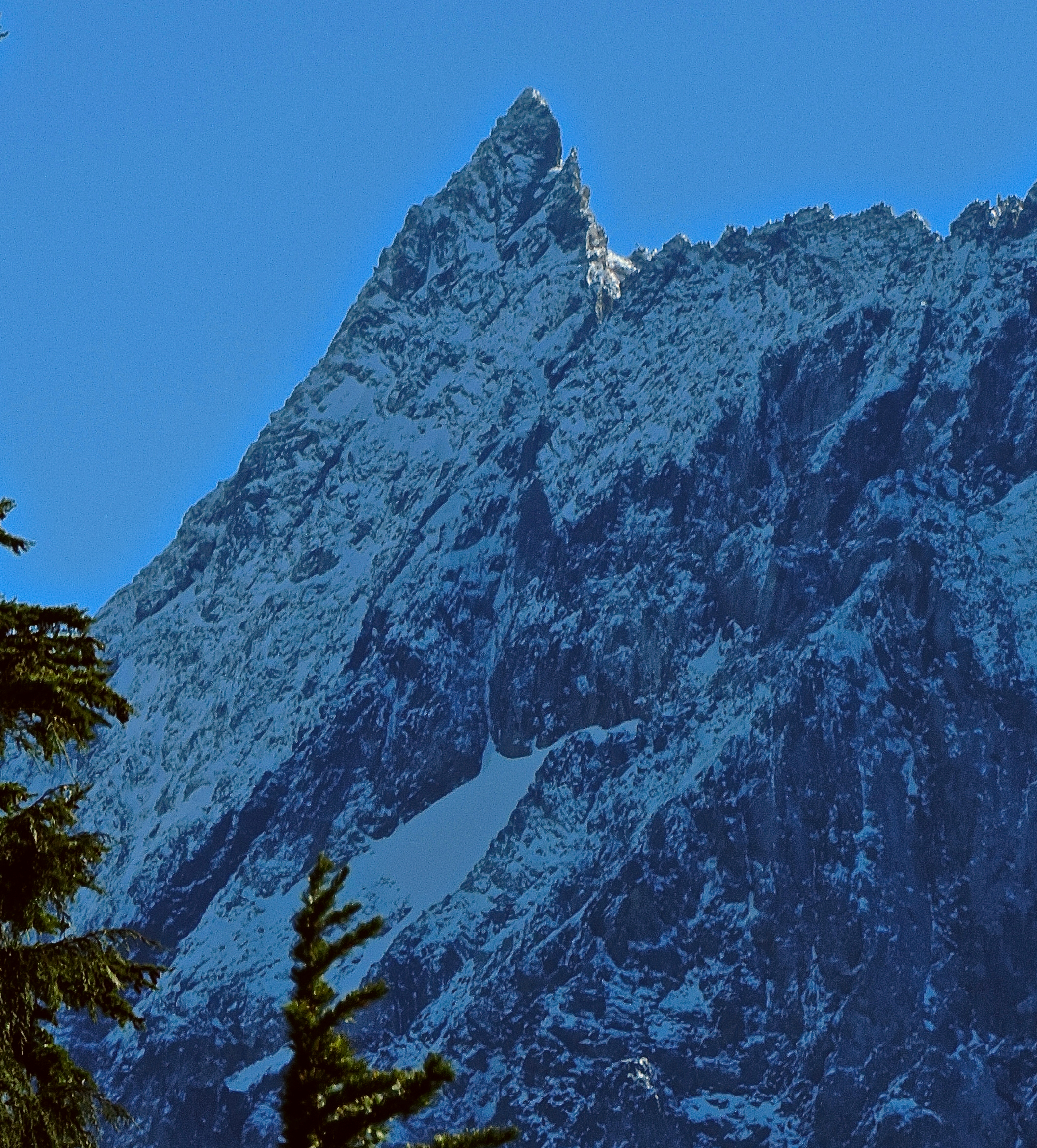
- The sharp summit of Magic Mountain

Highest point
- Elevation: 7,610 ft (2,320 m)
- Prominence: 530 ft (162 m)
- Parent peak: Hurry-up Peak (7,821 ft)
- Isolation: 0.86 mi (1.38 km)
- Coordinates: 48°26′46″N 121°02′29″W

Geography
- Location within Washington (state) Location within the United States
- Interactive map of Magic Mountain
- Country: United States
- State: Washington
- County: Chelan / Skagit
- Protected area: North Cascades National Park; Glacier Peak Wilderness
- Parent range: North Cascades; Cascade Range
- Topo map: USGS Cascade Pass

Geology
- Rock type: Magic Mountain Gneiss

Climbing
- First ascent: 1938, Calder Bressler, Ralph Clough, Bill Cox, Tom Myers
- Easiest route: scrambling + glacier travel

Magic Mountain is a 7,610-foot (2,320-metre) mountain summit located on the shared boundary of Skagit County and Chelan County in Washington state. It is part of the North Cascades, a subset of the Cascade Range. Magic Mountain is situated southeast of Cascade Pass on the shared border of North Cascades National Park and Glacier Peak Wilderness. The nearest peak is Pelton Peak 0.4 miles (0.64 km) to the northeast, and the nearest higher peak is Hurry-up Peak 0.83 miles (1.34 km) to the south. The Yawning Glacier and Cache Col Glacier rest on its northern flank. Magic Mountain is at the northern end of the Ptarmigan Traverse. Surface runoff on the north side the mountain drains into the Stehekin River, while precipitation drains into the Cascade River from the southwest side.

== Climate ==
Magic Mountain is located in the marine west coast climate zone of western North America. Most weather fronts coming off the Pacific Ocean travel northeast toward the Cascade Mountains. As fronts approach the North Cascades, they are forced upward by the peaks of the Cascade Range (orographic lift), causing them to drop their moisture in the form of rain or snowfall onto the Cascades. As a result, the west side of the North Cascades experiences high precipitation, especially during the winter months in the form of snowfall. Because of maritime influence, snow tends to be wet and heavy, resulting in high avalanche danger. During winter months, weather is usually cloudy, but, due to high pressure systems over the Pacific Ocean that intensify during summer months, there is often little or no cloud cover during the summer.

== Geology ==
The North Cascades features some of the most rugged topography in the Cascade Range with craggy peaks and ridges, deep glacial valleys, and granite spires. Geological events occurring many years ago created the diverse topography and drastic elevation changes over the Cascade Range leading to the various climate differences. These climate differences lead to vegetation variety defining the ecoregions in this area.

The history of the formation of the Cascade Mountains dates back millions of years ago to the late Eocene Epoch. With the North American Plate overriding the Pacific Plate, episodes of volcanic igneous activity persisted. In addition, small fragments of the oceanic and continental lithosphere called terranes created the North Cascades about 50 million years ago.

During the Pleistocene period dating back over two million years ago, glaciation advancing and retreating repeatedly scoured the landscape leaving deposits of rock debris. The U-shaped cross section of the river valleys is a result of recent glaciation. Uplift and faulting in combination with glaciation have been the dominant processes which have created the tall peaks and deep valleys of the North Cascades area.

== Gallery ==
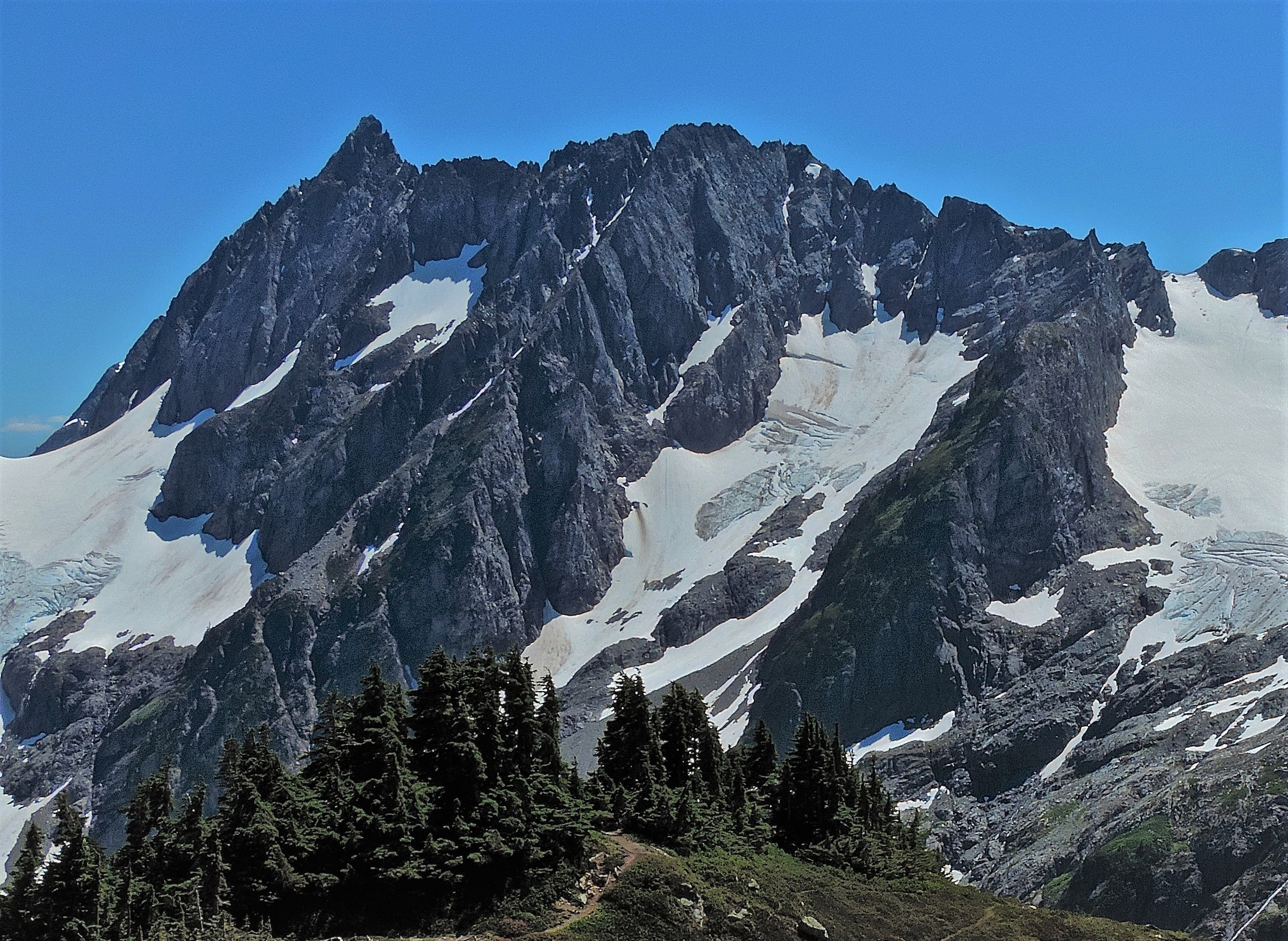
Magic Mountain

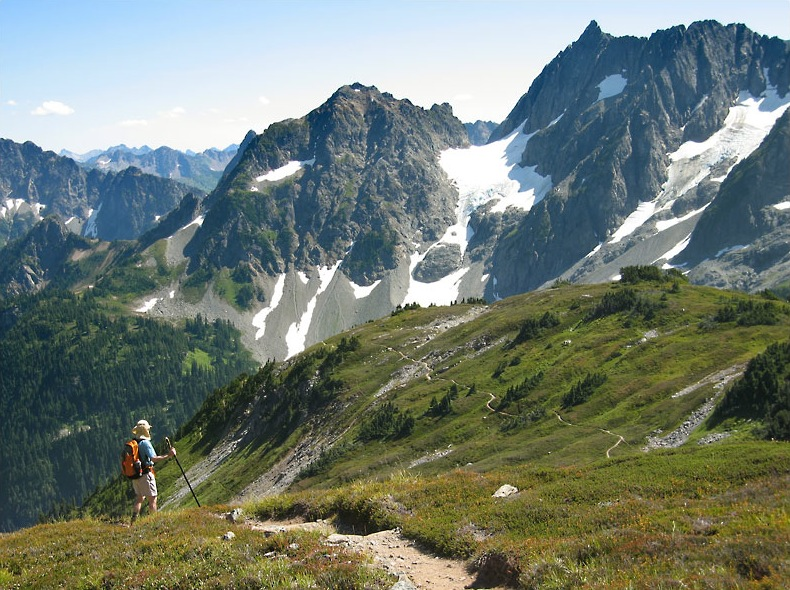
Magic Mountain to right

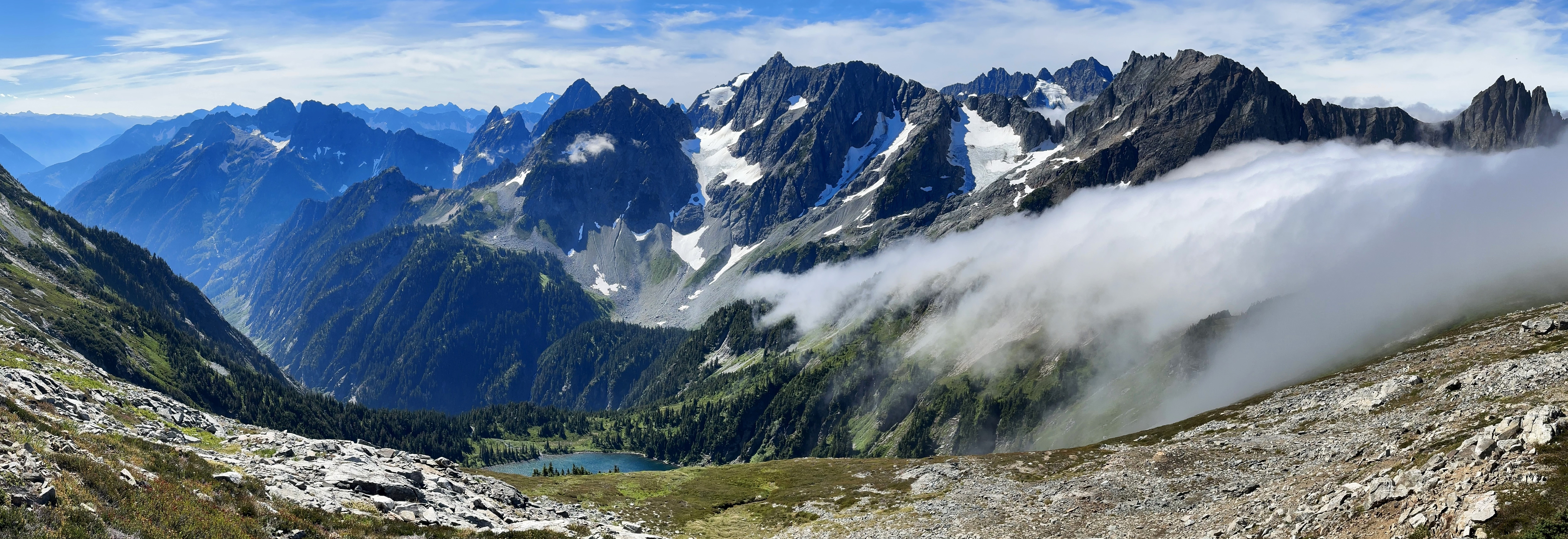
Magic Mountain centered

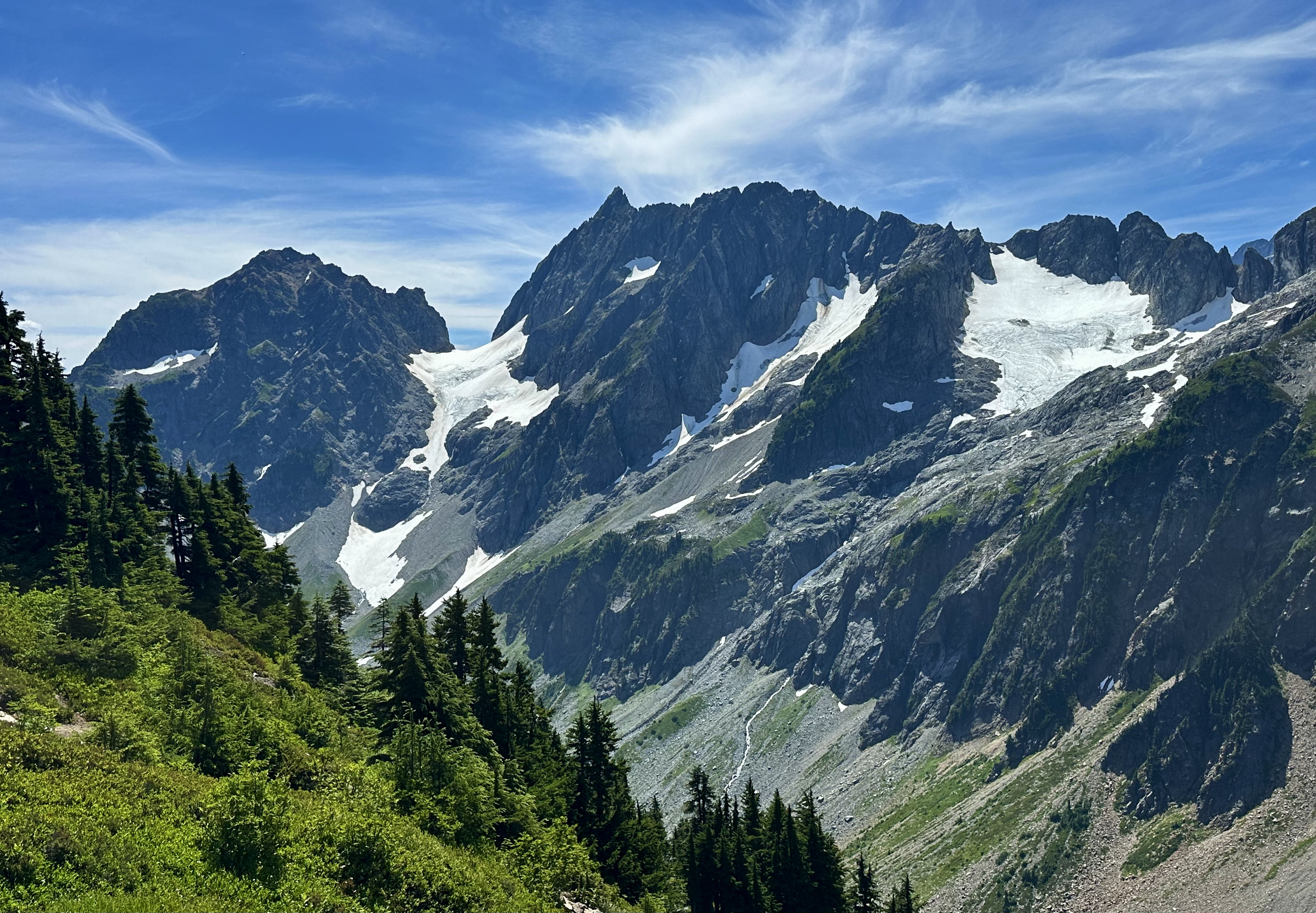
Magic Mountain viewed from Cascade Pass

== See also ==
- Geography of the North Cascades
- Geology of the Pacific Northwest
