= Stehekin River =

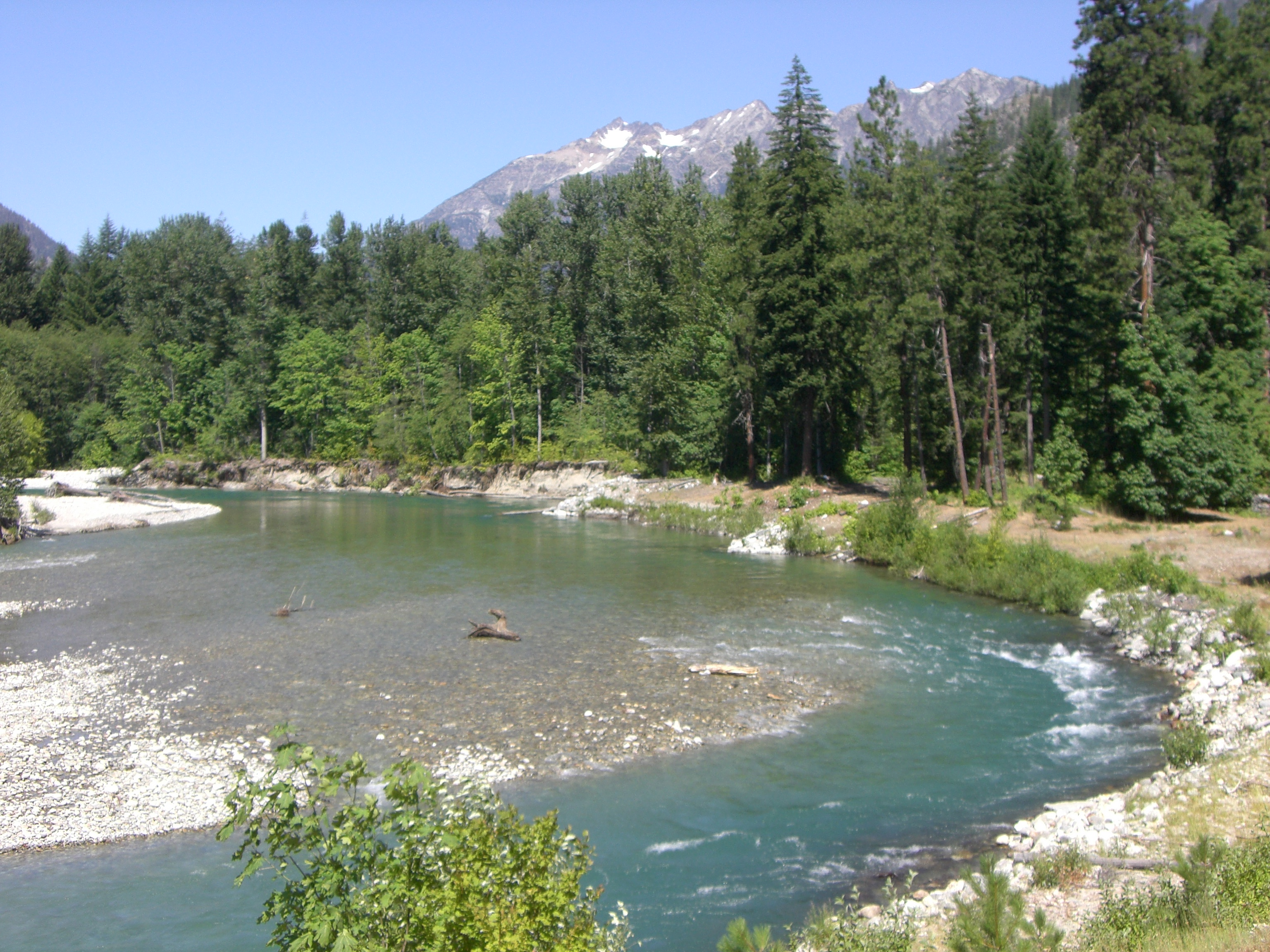
- Stehekin River near Buckner homestead (McGregor Mountain in background)

- Location of the mouth of the Stehekin River in Washington

Location
- Country: United States
- State: Washington
- County: Chelan

Physical characteristics
- Source: Cascade Range
  - coordinates: 48°27′15″N 121°2′24″W
- Mouth: Lake Chelan
  - coordinates: 48°19′10″N 120°40′35″W
  - elevation: 1,102 ft (336 m)
- Length: 17 mi (27 km)
- Basin size: 321 sq mi (830 km^{2})
- Discharge
  - location: river mile 1.4 at Stehekin, WA
  - average: 1,403 cu ft/s (39.7 m^{3}/s)
  - minimum: 58 cu ft/s (1.6 m^{3}/s)
  - maximum: 18,000 cu ft/s (510 m^{3}/s)

The Stehekin River is a river located in Washington state in the Pacific Northwest of the United States. It is the main river flowing into Lake Chelan. Miners arrived in Stehekin River Valley in the late 19th century. They were followed by homesteaders in the early 20th century. The Stehekin River Valley remains a remote area that can only be reached by way of a 55-mile boat ride (89 km) up Lake Chelan.

The river's name comes from the Columbia-Moses word stx^{w}íkn', which means "the way through."

== Course ==
The Stehekin River originates in the North Cascades near Cascade Pass in North Cascades National Park. It collects the waters of numerous headwater tributaries such as Pelton Creek, Doubtful Creek, and Basin Creek. Major peaks near the source of the Stehekin River include Boston Peak, Buckner Mountain, Booker Mountain, Sahale Mountain, Magic Mountain, Mix-up Peak, and Hurry-up Peak.

The Stehekin River flows generally west and southwest from these mountains, south of Park Creek Ridge to its confluence with Park Creek. Shortly below Park Creek the river receives Bridge Creek, one of its main tributaries. Bridge Creek joins from the north and drains northernmost Chelan County in North Cascades National Park. Bridge Creek and its tributaries drain a number of significant peaks including Goode Mountain, Storm King, Mount Logan, Black Peak, and others. Bridge Creek's source is located near Rainy Pass and Washington Pass along Washington State Route 20. The Stehekin River continues generally southeast below McGregor Mountain to the northwest end of Lake Chelan. Shortly above the lake it receives Agnes Creek, another significant tributary, from the west. Agnes Creek drains the northernmost part of Wenatchee National Forest. Its final mile marks the boundary between North Cascades National Park and Lake Chelan National Recreation Area.

At the Agnes Creek confluence the Stehekin River exits the national park and enters the national recreation area. The Stehekin River enters Lake Chelan near Stehekin, a small community accessible only by boat. Roads from Stehekin follow the river up much of its valley. There are numerous campgrounds. The Pacific Crest Trail enters the Stehekin River basin from the south via Suiattle Pass, down South Fork Agnes Creek and Agnes Creek to the Stehekin River, then up the Stehekin to Bridge Creek and up Bridge Creek to Rainy Pass.

== History ==
In the 1880s, miners began infiltrating the remote Stehekin River valley in search of mineral wealth. Between the years 1887–1910, a significant number of miners arrived looking for mineral deposits in the North Cascades. By 1890, there was a relatively large hotel Stehekin on Lake Chelan at the mouth of the Stehekin River. The hotel served tourists and fishermen as well as miners.

Over the centuries, the changing course of the Stehekin River deposited rich, alluvial sediments along the valley floor; it also left behind large boulders that made farming difficult. Early homesteaders began farming in the valley around 1910. The most desirable homesteads were located along the Stehekin River and its tributaries since these sites provided a reliable water supply for farming and natural transportation routes leading to Lake Chelan. The Buckner Homestead was one of the earliest farms along the Stehekin River. It is now listed on the National Register of Historic Places.

Because of the harsh winters, few early settlers remained in the valley year around. In the fall most homesteaders would leave the area, choosing to spend the winter in less isolated communities like Chelan. In the spring, families would return the Stehekin Valley to work their farms. Many of the early homesteaders supplemented their incomes by guiding miners into the backcountry and packing goods to remote mining claims. In 1902, the valley's first school was opened in a cabin located at the head of the Lake Chelan. It was later replaced by structure known as the Kronk cabin. In 1921, valley residents select a site for a new school. The school was a log structure, built by local volunteers. The Stehekin School is listed in the National Register of Historic Places.

As mining declined, subsistence farming, logging, and tourism sustained the residents of the Stehekin Valley. Apples were an important crop in the first half of the 20th century. In the winter, hunting and trapping a part of life for year around residents. With the arrival of the United States Forest Service and the establishment of the Stehekin Ranger District in 1905, reliable seasonal work became available to valley residents.

The isolated Stehekin Valley has fewer than one hundred year-around residents, most employed by the National Park Service. The only way into the valley is a 55-mile boat ride (89 km) from Chelan. A few boats provided daily service between Chelan and Stehekin during the summer with the winter service being more limited.

== Recreation ==
During the summer tourism is important since the area is now part of the Lake Chelan National Recreation Area. The Stehekin River is scenic and remote, offering whitewater rafting and kayaking opportunities. There are many camp sites available along the river. The Stehekin River is known as for its excellent fly-fishing. Rainbow and cutthroat trout fishing is best in the spring, and fishermen come for sockeye salmon in the fall.

== Tributaries ==
These are the main tributaries of the Stehekin River:

- Agnes Creek
- Arrow Creek
- Basin Creek
- Battalion Creek
- Blackberry Creek
- Boulder Creek
- Bridge Creek
- Buzzard Creek
- Cabin Creek
- Canim Creek
- Clear Creek
- Company Creek
- Coon Creek
- Cottonwood Creek
- Doubtful Creek
- Flat Creek
- Junction Creek
- Margerum Creek
- McGregor Creek
- Moon Creek
- Park Creek
- Pelton Creek
- Rainbow Creek
- Sun Creek
- Theis Creek
- Tolo Creek
Tributary Photos
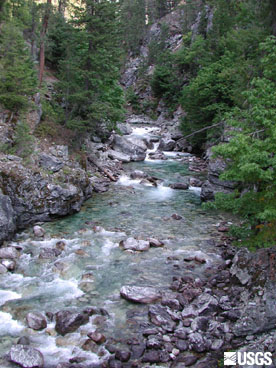
Bridge Creek

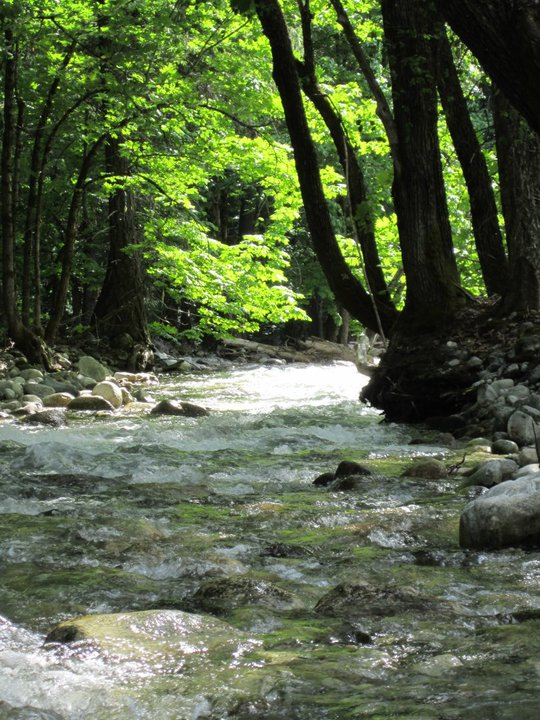
Boulder Creek taken near its outlet into the Stehekin River

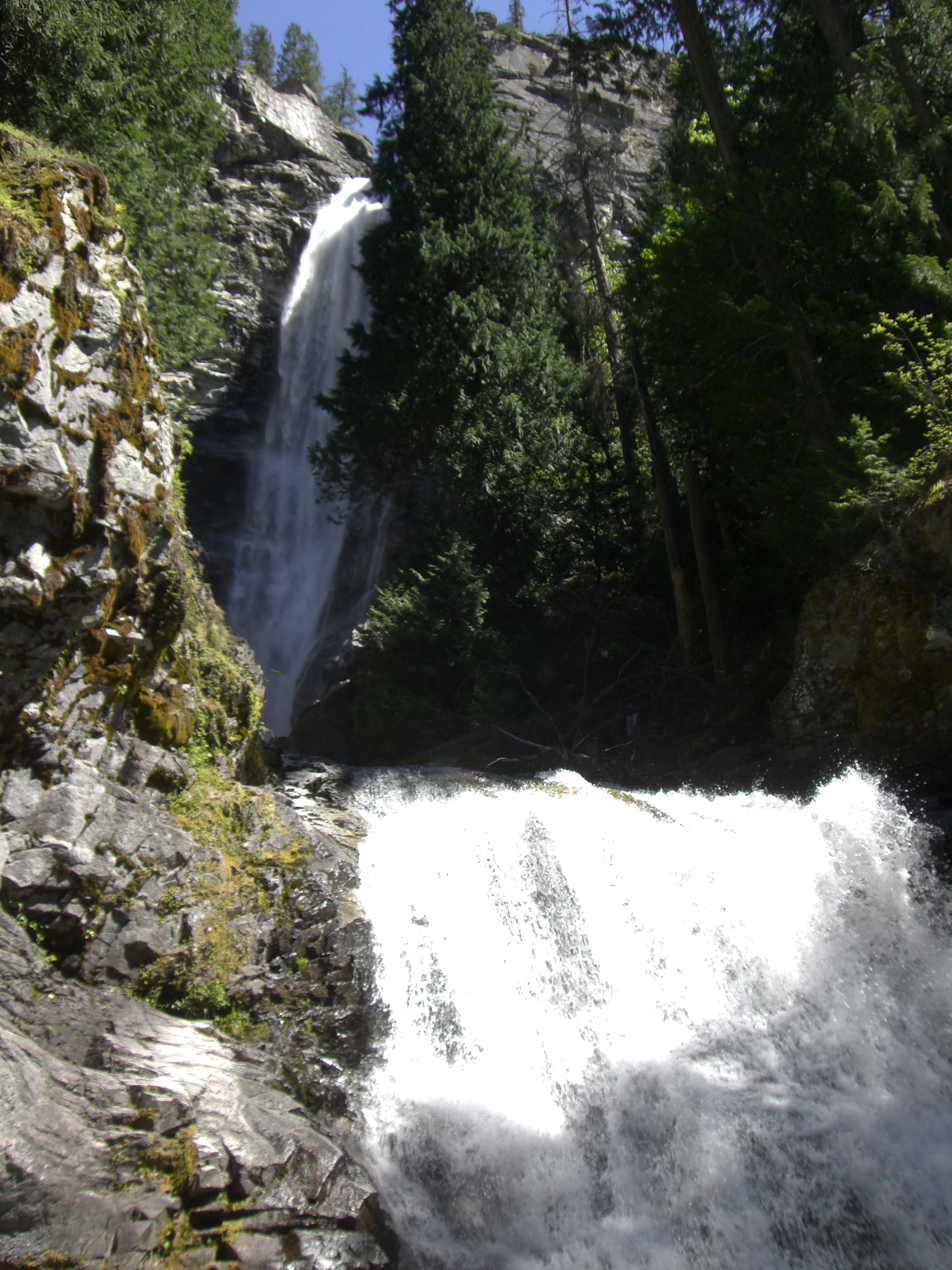
Rainbow Falls, Rainbow Creek

== See also ==
- List of rivers of Washington (state)
- List of tributaries of the Columbia River
