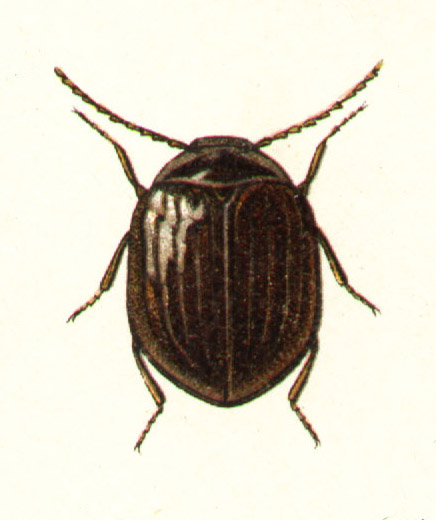
- Eubria palustris adult

Scientific classification
- Domain: Eukaryota
- Kingdom: Animalia
- Phylum: Arthropoda
- Class: Insecta
- Order: Coleoptera
- Suborder: Polyphaga
- Infraorder: Elateriformia
- Family: Psephenidae
- Subfamily: Eubriinae; Lacordaire, 1857

Genera
- Acneus; Aethioeubria; Dicranopselaphus; Ectopria; Eubria; Falsodrupeus; Neoeubria; Sclerocyphon

= Eubriinae =

Subfamily of beetles

Eubriinae is an aquatic beetle subfamily in the family Psephenidae.
