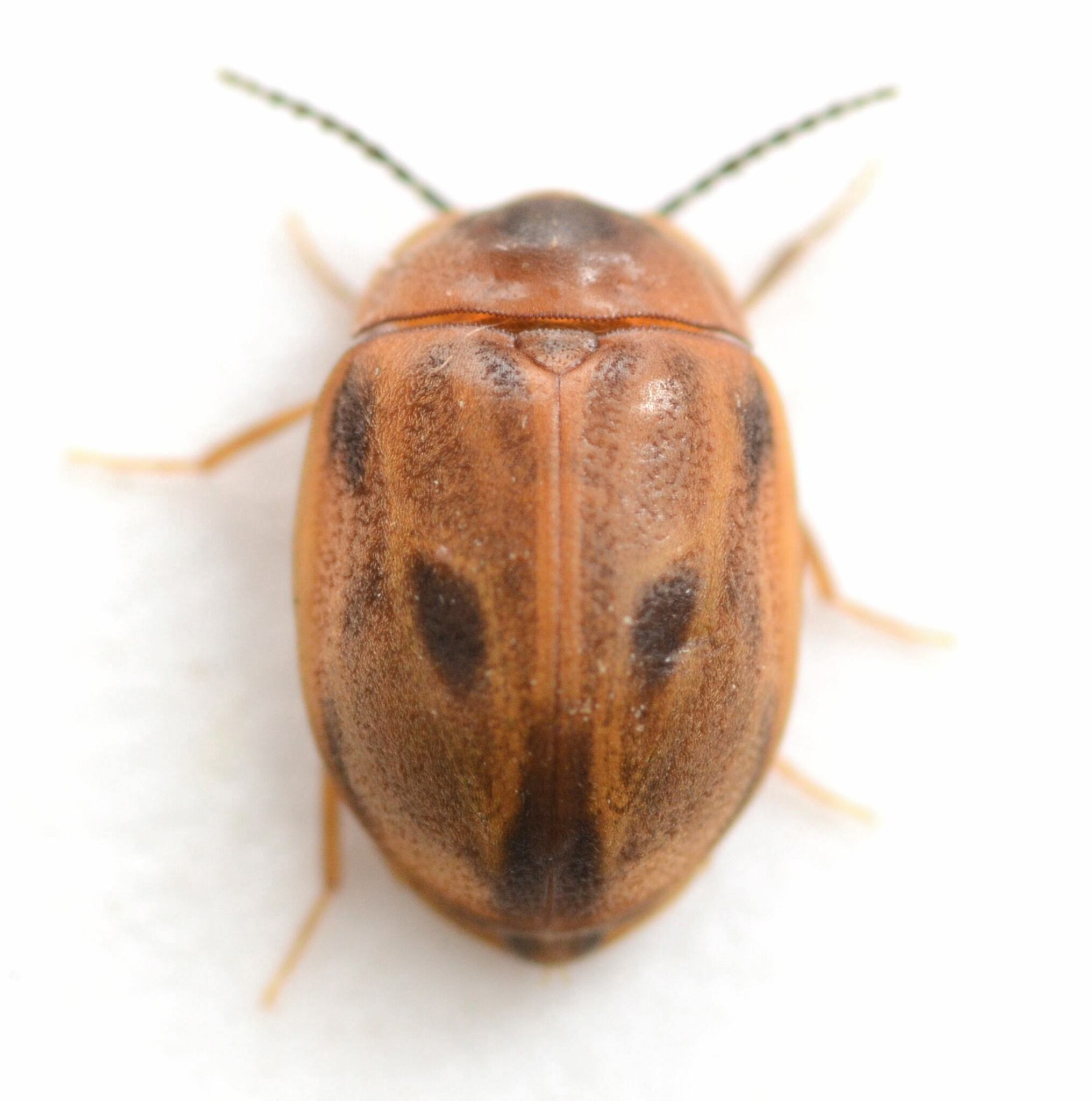

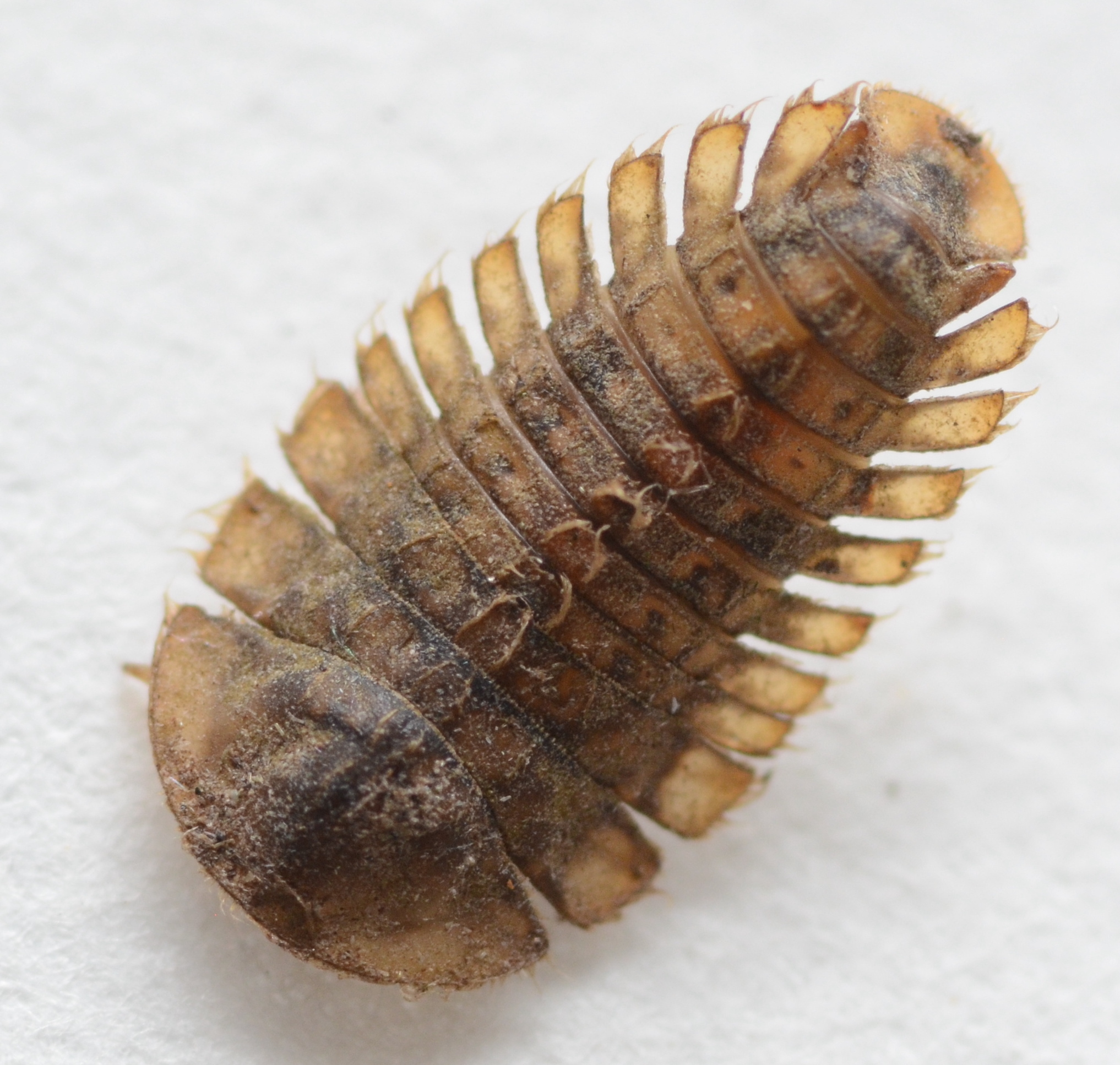
- Adult (top) and larva (bottom)

Conservation status
- Unranked (NatureServe)

Scientific classification
- Kingdom: Animalia
- Phylum: Arthropoda
- Clade: Pancrustacea
- Class: Insecta
- Order: Coleoptera
- Suborder: Polyphaga
- Infraorder: Elateriformia
- Family: Psephenidae
- Genus: Acneus
- Species: A. beeri

Binomial name
- Acneus beeri Hatch, 1961

= Acneus beeri =

Species of beetle

Acneus beeri, also known as Beer's false water penny beetle, is a species of aquatic beetle in the family Psephenidae. It was first described from a single female specimen collected east of Cascadia, Oregon in July 1940.
