= Quartzville Creek =

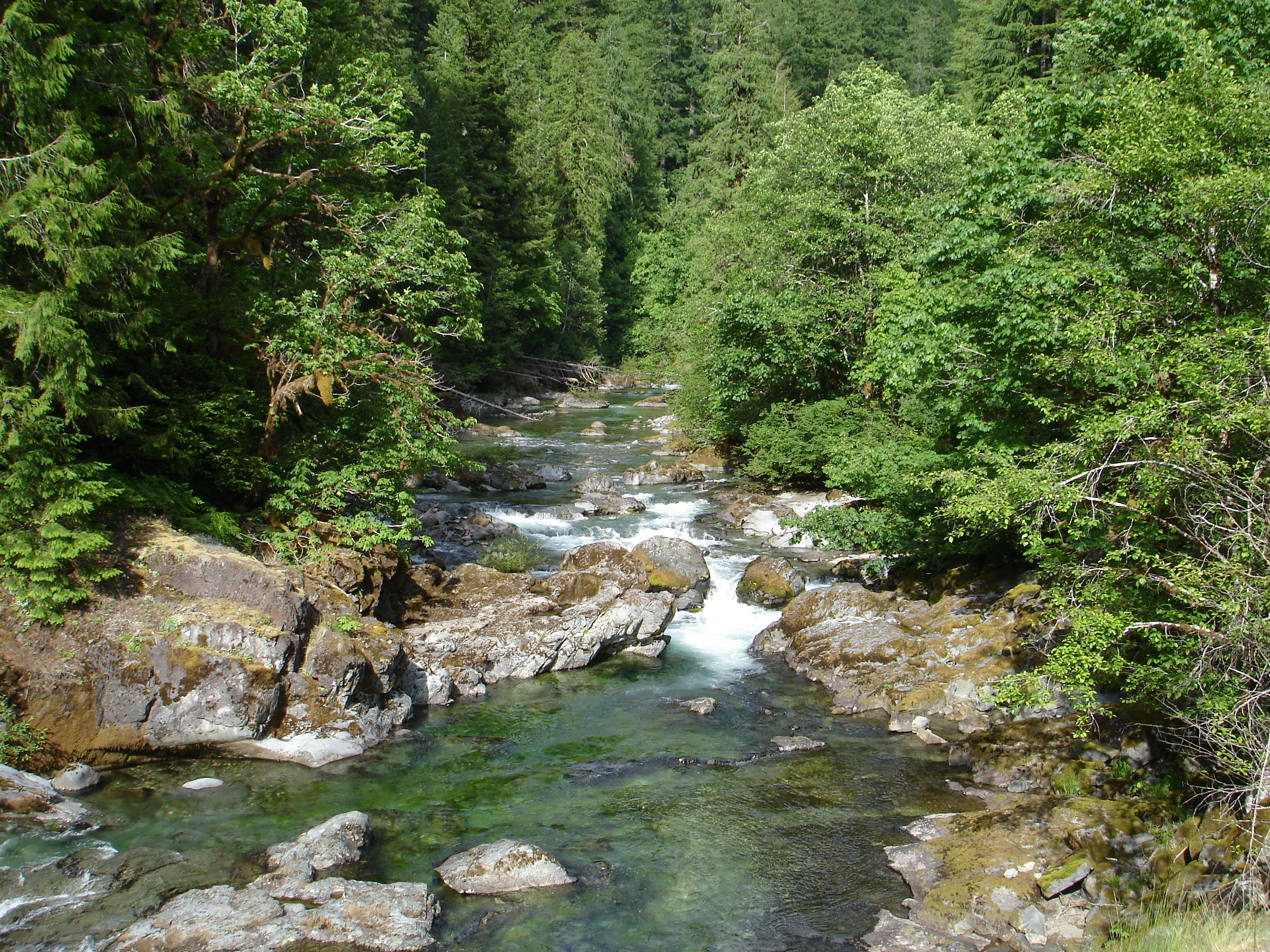
- Flowing through the forest

- Location of the mouth of Quartzville Creek in Oregon
- Etymology: former gold-mining town in the creek's watershed

Location
- Country: United States
- State: Oregon
- County: Linn

Physical characteristics
- Source
  - location: Willamette National Forest, Cascade Range
  - coordinates: 44°34′20″N 122°07′38″W
  - elevation: 4,094 ft (1,248 m)
- Mouth: Middle Santiam River
  - location: Green Peter Reservoir
  - coordinates: 44°28′34″N 122°30′04″W
  - elevation: 1,014 ft (309 m)
- Length: 28 mi (45 km)
- Basin size: 171 sq mi (440 km^{2})
- Discharge
  - location: 10 miles (16 km) north of Cascadia at river mile 6.6
  - average: 652 cu ft/s (18.5 m^{3}/s)
  - minimum: 14 cu ft/s (0.40 m^{3}/s)
  - maximum: 23,700 cu ft/s (670 m^{3}/s)

National Wild and Scenic Rivers System
- Type: Recreational
- Designated: October 28, 1988

Quartzville Creek is a 28-mile (45 km) tributary of the Middle Santiam River in Linn County in the U.S. state of Oregon. It is paralleled by the Quartzville Back Country Byway and used for recreation, including camping, fishing, hunting, kayaking, and gold panning. The lower 12 miles (19 km) of the creek, from the Willamette National Forest boundary to Green Peter Reservoir, was designated Wild and Scenic in 1988.

== Course ==
The creek, beginning at an elevation of about 4,100 feet (1,200 m) between Pinnacle and Gordon peaks in the Cascade Range, flows generally west and southwest through Willamette National Forest. In its upper reaches, it receives Butte and Bruler creeks from the right, Freezeout Creek from the left, Beabe Creek from the left, Little Meadows Creek from the right, Gregg and McQuade creeks from the left, then Gold Creek from the right. In the next stretch, Green, Savage, and Galena creeks enter from the left. Below Galena Creek, Quartzville Creek leaves the national forest and Canal Creek enters from the right. One of Canal Creek's tributaries, Dry Gulch, drains the former Quartzville townsite for which Quartzville Creek is named.

Downstream of Canal Creek, the creek is followed on the right by Quartzville Road. Along this stretch, Yellowbottom Creek enters from the right at Yellowbottom Campground. Shortly thereafter, the creek turns sharply south and receives Packers Gulch from the right. Further downstream, Boulder Creek enters from the left, then Yellowstone and Four Bit creeks, both from the right. Thereafter, Quartzville Creek reaches the Dogwood Picnic Area, on the right, and Cascade Falls, on a minor tributary to the left. The creek then flows by a stream gauge maintained by the United States Geological Survey 6.6 miles (10.6 km) from the mouth. Here Panther Creek enters from the right.

Continuing generally southwest, the creek receives Trout Creek and Moose Creek from the right as it enters a northern arm of Green Peter Reservoir. Foots Canyon, which drains part of Green Peter Peninsula, enters from the left before the creek reaches Whitcomb Creek Park, on the right. About 1 mile (1.6 km) beyond the park, the creek merges with the Middle Santiam River, 9 miles (14 km) from its confluence with the South Santiam River at Foster Reservoir.

=== Discharge ===
The United States Geological Survey operates a stream gauge 6.6 miles (10.6 km) upstream from the mouth. The average flow at this station between 1966 and 2011 was 652 cubic feet per second (18.5 m^{3}/s). The maximum flow was 23,700 cubic feet per second (670 m^{3}/s) on February 7, 1996, and the minimum flow was 14 cubic feet per second (0.40 m^{3}/s) on August 19–23, 1973. The drainage area above this gauge is 99.2 square miles (257 km^{2}), about 58 percent of the whole watershed.

A maximum flow larger than the recorded maximum has been estimated at 36,500 cubic feet per second (1,030 m^{3}/s) on December 22, 1964. This flow occurred during the floods of December 1964 and January 1965, rated by the National Weather Service as one of Oregon's top 10 weather events of the 20th century.

== See also ==
- List of rivers of Oregon
