= Ectopria leechi =

Scientific classification
- Domain: Eukaryota
- Kingdom: Animalia
- Phylum: Arthropoda
- Class: Insecta
- Order: Coleoptera
- Suborder: Polyphaga
- Infraorder: Elateriformia
- Family: Psephenidae
- Genus: Ectopria
- Species: E. leechi

Binomial name
- Ectopria leechi Brigham, 1981

Species of beetle

Ectopria leechi is a species of water penny beetle in the family Psephenidae. It is found in North America.
