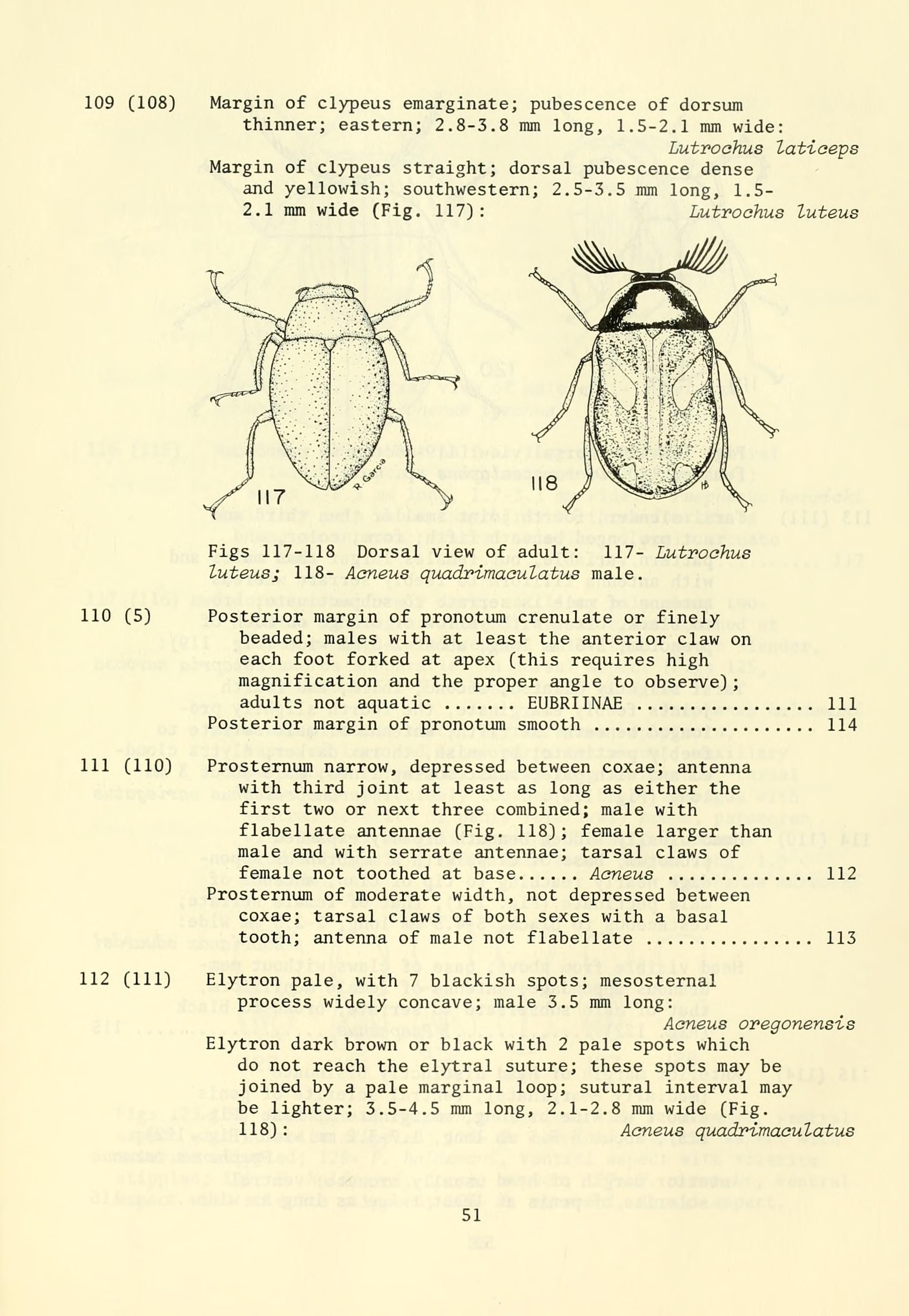
- Research document describing aquatic dryopoid beetles

Scientific classification
- Kingdom: Animalia
- Phylum: Arthropoda
- Clade: Pancrustacea
- Class: Insecta
- Order: Coleoptera
- Suborder: Polyphaga
- Infraorder: Elateriformia
- Family: Psephenidae
- Genus: Acneus
- Species: A. quadrimaculatus

Binomial name
- Acneus quadrimaculatus Horn, 1880

= Acneus quadrimaculatus =

Species of beetle

Acneus quadrimaculatus is a species of water penny beetle in the family Psephenidae. It is endemic to the United States with records from California and Oregon. Adults occur in riparian vegetation.
