= Acneus burnelli =

Conservation status
- Unranked (NatureServe)

Scientific classification
- Kingdom: Animalia
- Phylum: Arthropoda
- Clade: Pancrustacea
- Class: Insecta
- Order: Coleoptera
- Suborder: Polyphaga
- Infraorder: Elateriformia
- Family: Psephenidae
- Genus: Acneus
- Species: A. burnelli

Binomial name
- Acneus burnelli Fender, 1962

Species of beetle

Acneus burnelli, also known as Burnell's false water penny beetle, is a species of aquatic beetle in the family Psephenidae. It was described and only known from a single male specimen that was collected southwest of Powers, Oregon in July 1960 by B. B. Burnell.
