= Eubrianax edwardsii =

Scientific classification
- Kingdom: Animalia
- Phylum: Arthropoda
- Class: Insecta
- Order: Coleoptera
- Suborder: Polyphaga
- Infraorder: Elateriformia
- Family: Psephenidae
- Genus: Eubrianax
- Species: E. edwardsii

Binomial name
- Eubrianax edwardsii (LeConte, 1874)

Species of beetle

Eubrianax edwardsii is a species of water penny beetle in the family Psephenidae. It is found in North America.
