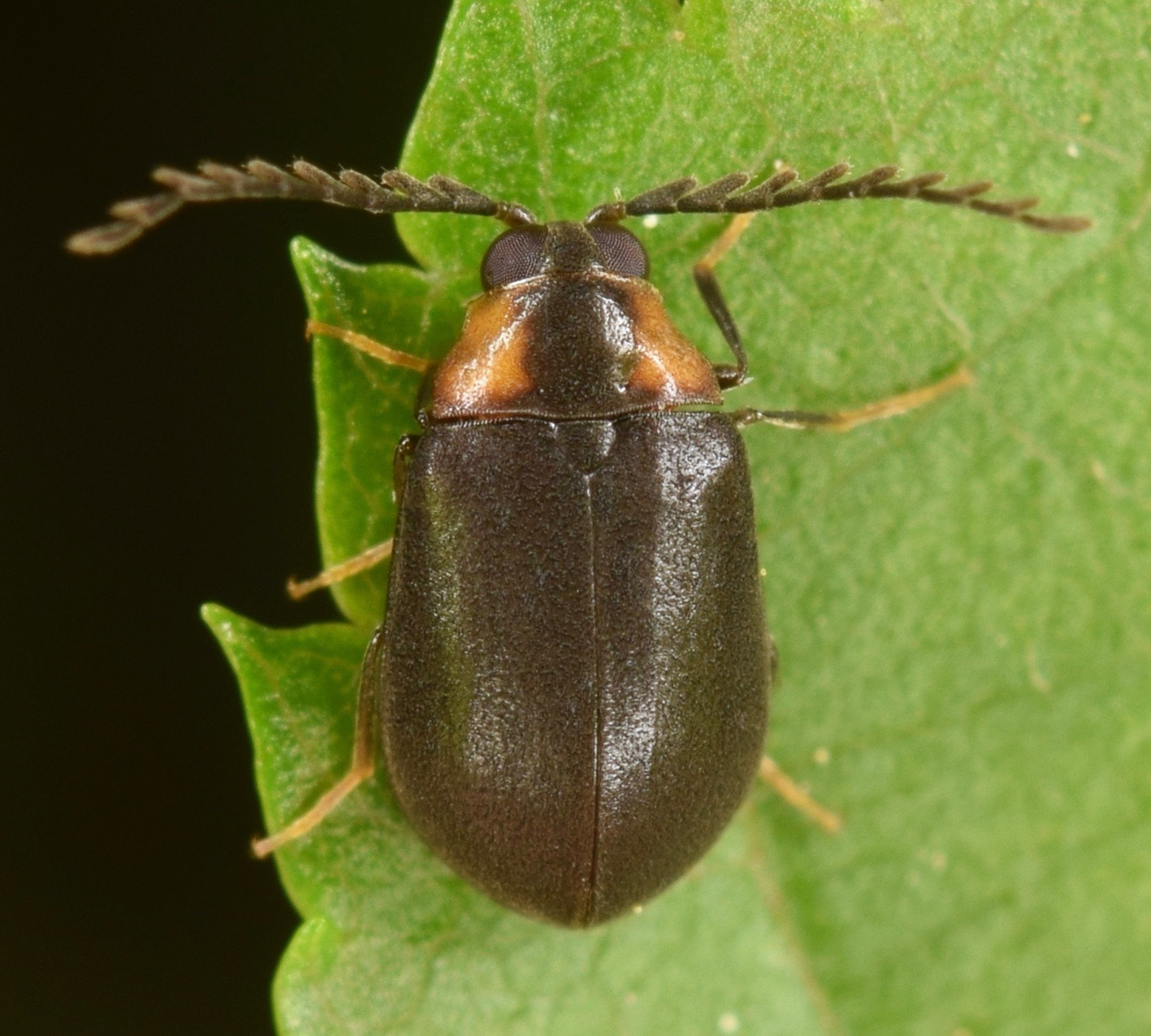

Scientific classification
- Kingdom: Animalia
- Phylum: Arthropoda
- Class: Insecta
- Order: Coleoptera
- Suborder: Polyphaga
- Infraorder: Elateriformia
- Family: Psephenidae
- Genus: Ectopria
- Species: E. nervosa

Binomial name
- Ectopria nervosa (Melsheimer, 1845)

Synonyms
- Ectopria thoracica (Ziegler, 1845)

= Ectopria nervosa =

Species of beetle

Ectopria nervosa is a species of water penny beetle in the family Psephenidae. It is found in North America.
