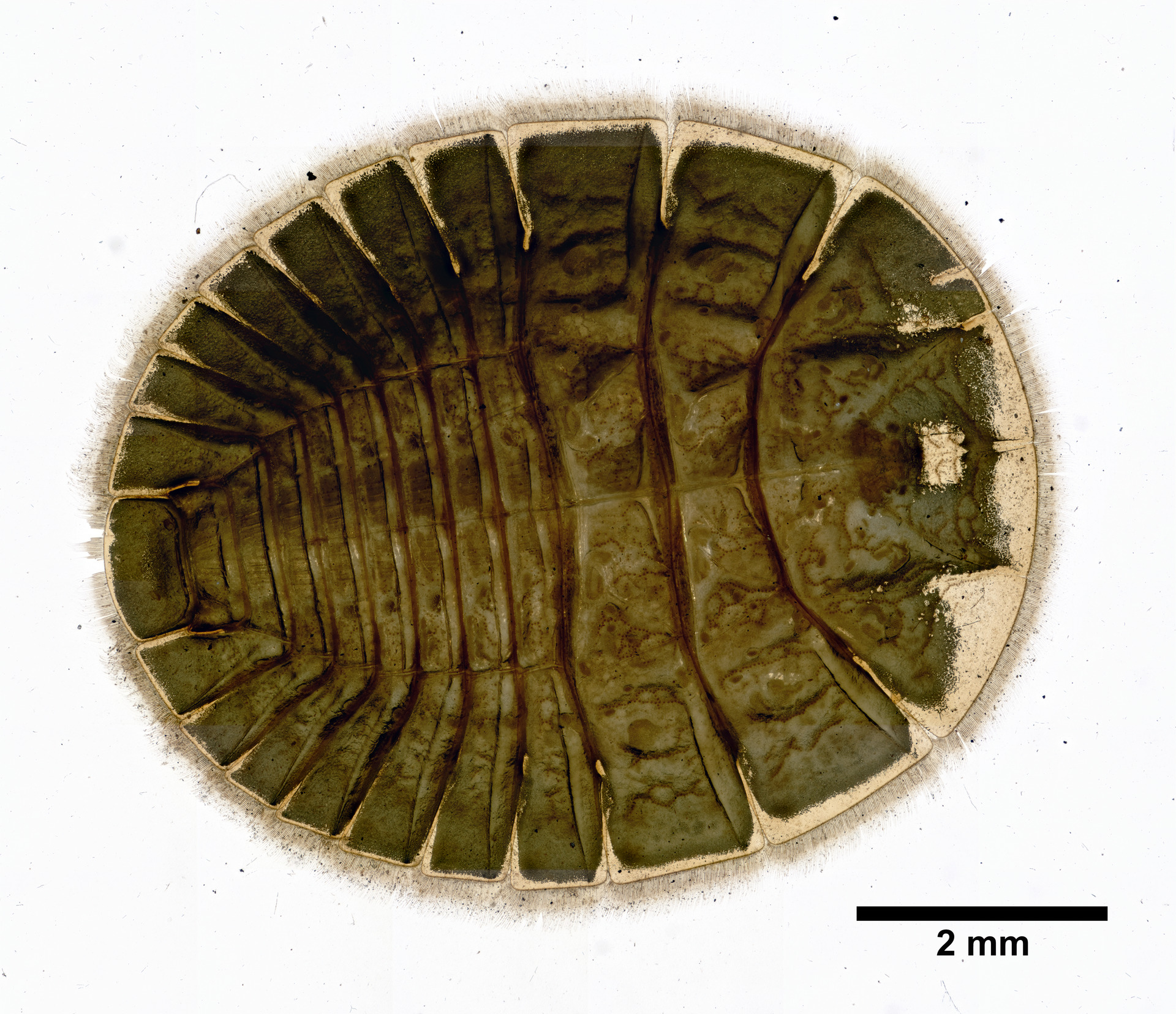

Scientific classification
- Domain: Eukaryota
- Kingdom: Animalia
- Phylum: Arthropoda
- Class: Insecta
- Order: Coleoptera
- Suborder: Polyphaga
- Infraorder: Elateriformia
- Family: Psephenidae
- Genus: Psephenus
- Species: P. herricki

Binomial name
- Psephenus herricki (Dekay, 1844)

Synonyms
- Psephenus lecontei (LeConte, 1852)

= Psephenus herricki =

Species of beetle

Psephenus herricki is a species of water penny beetle in the family Psephenidae. It is found in eastern North America.
