= Quartzville =

Quartzville may refer to:

- Quartzville, former name of Nashville, California
- Quartzville Creek, in Oregon
- Quartzville, New Zealand, an 1870s mining settlement in the Carrick Range during the Otago gold rush and another near Waiorongomai, Waikato in the 1880s
