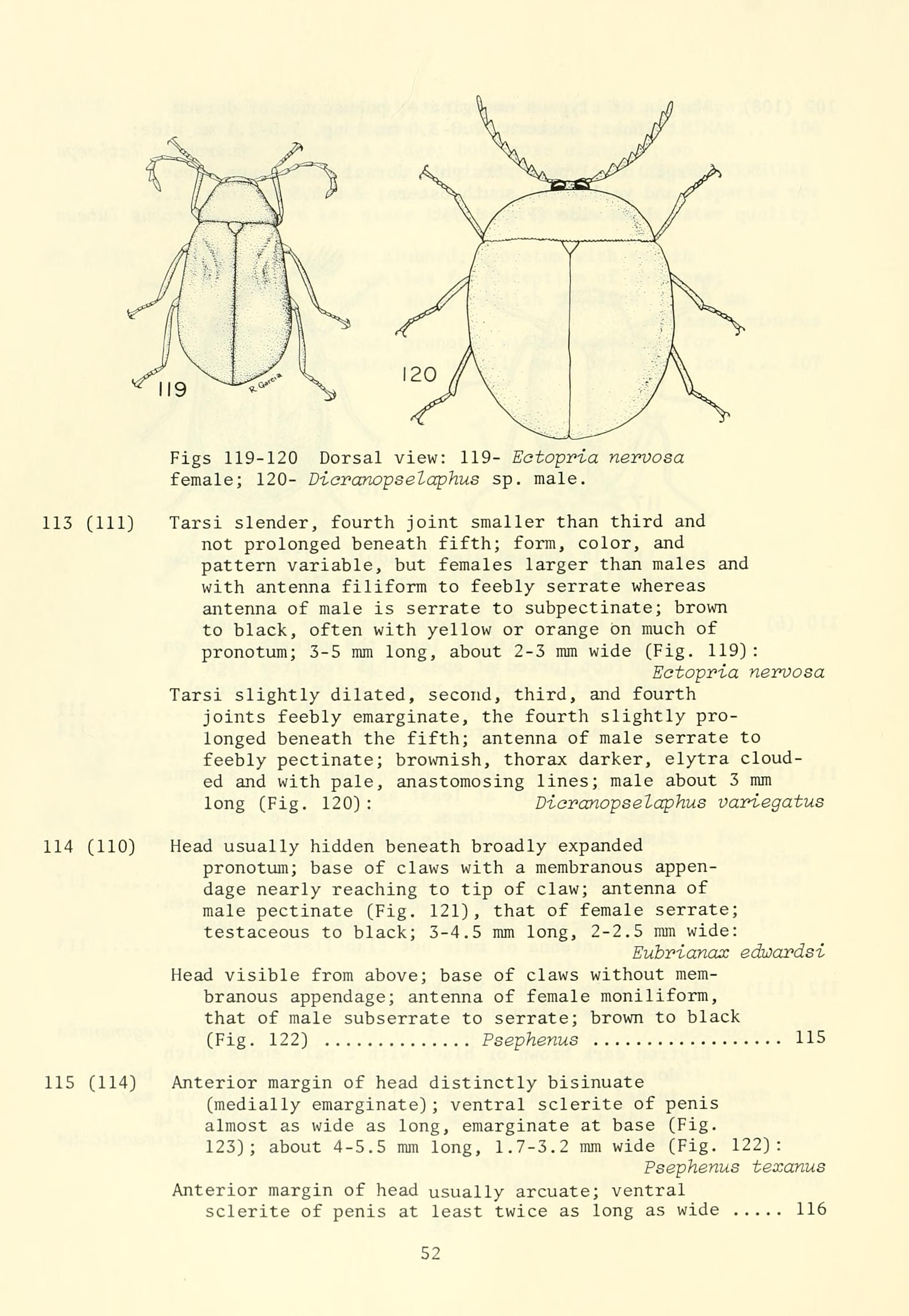
- A page from "Aquatic dryopoid beetles (Coleoptera) of the United States" by Harley P. Brown.

Scientific classification
- Kingdom: Animalia
- Phylum: Arthropoda
- Class: Insecta
- Order: Coleoptera
- Suborder: Polyphaga
- Infraorder: Elateriformia
- Family: Psephenidae
- Subfamily: Eubriinae
- Genus: Dicranopselaphus; Guérin-Méneville, 1861

Synonyms
- Alabameubria Brown, 1980

= Dicranopselaphus =

Genus of beetles

Dicranopselaphus is a genus of water-penny beetles in the family Psephenidae. There are over 40 described species in Dicranopselaphus, distributed in Asia and North America.

== Species ==
These species belong to the genus Dicranopselaphus:

- Dicranopselaphus bicolor Lee & Yang, 1996 (China: Yunnan)
- Dicranopselaphus brevicornis Lee & Yang, 1996 (Indonesia)
- Dicranopselaphus dentatus Lee, Yang & Satô, 2000 (India: Assam, Meghalaya)
- Dicranopselaphus doiinthanonus Lee & Yang, 1996 (Thailand, Vietnam, Laos)
- Dicranopselaphus emasensis Lee & Yang, 1996 (Malaysia)
- Dicranopselaphus emmanueli Pic, 1918 (Philippines, Malaysia, Indonesia: Sumatra)
- Dicranopselaphus fangensis Lee & Yang, 1996 (Thailand)
- Dicranopselaphus flavicornis Guérin-Méneville, 1861 (Mexico: Veracruz)
- Dicranopselaphus flavus Lee & Yang, 1996 (Malaysia)
- Dicranopselaphus gressitti Lee, Yang & Satô, 2000 (China: Hubei)
- Dicranopselaphus imparis Lee, Yang & Satô, 2000 (Vietnam: Vĩnh Phúc Province)
- Dicranopselaphus jaechi Lee & Yang, 1996 (Indonesia: Java)
- Dicranopselaphus javanus Pic, 1916 (Indonesia: Java)
- Dicranopselaphus jiangxiensis Lee & Yang, 1996 (China: Jiangxi)
- Dicranopselaphus laevis Lee, Yang & Satô, 2000 (Vietnam: Lâm Đồng)
- Dicranopselaphus lesueurii Guérin-Méneville, 1861 (Mexico)
- Dicranopselaphus luzonensis Lee, Yang & Satô, 2000 (Philippines: Luzon)
- Dicranopselaphus malickyi Lee & Yang, 1996 (Thailand)
- Dicranopselaphus morimotoi Lee & Yang, 1996 (Thailand)
- Dicranopselaphus multimaculatus Pic, 1934 (Malaysia, Indonesia: Kalimantan)
- Dicranopselaphus nagaii Lee & Yang, 1996 (Philippines)
- Dicranopselaphus nantai Lee & Yang, 1996 (Taiwan)
- Dicranopselaphus nepalensis Lee & Yang, 1996 (Nepal, India)
- Dicranopselaphus pictus Guérin-Méneville, 1861 (Mexico: Oaxaca)
- Dicranopselaphus raii Lee, Yang & Satô, 2000 (Nepal: Kathmandu)
- Dicranopselaphus reticulatus Nakane, 1952 (Japan: Ryukyu Islands)
- Dicranopselaphus rufescens Guérin-Méneville, 1861 (Mexico: Veracruz)
- Dicranopselaphus rufus Pic, 1916 (Malaysia, Singapore, Thailand, China: Yunnan)
- Dicranopselaphus sabahensis Lee & Yang, 1996 (Malaysia)
- Dicranopselaphus sakaii Lee & Yang, 1996 (Philippines)
- Dicranopselaphus sarawacensis Lee & Yang, 1996 (Malaysia)
- Dicranopselaphus schneideri Lee & Yang, 1996 (Indonesia)
- Dicranopselaphus septemspinosus Lee, Yang & Satô, 2000 (Myanmar: Kachin State)
- Dicranopselaphus sichuanensis Lee & Yang, 1996 (China: Sichuan)
- Dicranopselaphus similis Lee & Yang, 1996 (China: Fujian, Hong Kong)
- Dicranopselaphus spadix Lee, Yang & Satô, 2000 (Nepal: Kathmandu)
- Dicranopselaphus sumatrensis Lee, Yang & Satô, 2000 (Indonesia: Sumatra)
- Dicranopselaphus testaceicornis Pic, 1923 (China: Shandong)
- Dicranopselaphus variegatus Horn, 1880 (USA: Alabama) (variegated false water penny beetle)
- Dicranopselaphus venosus Champion, 1897
