= Psephenus texanus =

Scientific classification
- Domain: Eukaryota
- Kingdom: Animalia
- Phylum: Arthropoda
- Class: Insecta
- Order: Coleoptera
- Suborder: Polyphaga
- Infraorder: Elateriformia
- Family: Psephenidae
- Genus: Psephenus
- Species: P. texanus

Binomial name
- Psephenus texanus Brown & Arrington, 1967

Species of beetle

Psephenus texanus, the Texas water penny, is a species of water penny beetle in the family Psephenidae. It is found in Texas and northeastern Mexico.
