= Psephenus falli =

Scientific classification
- Kingdom: Animalia
- Phylum: Arthropoda
- Class: Insecta
- Order: Coleoptera
- Suborder: Polyphaga
- Infraorder: Elateriformia
- Family: Psephenidae
- Genus: Psephenus
- Species: P. falli

Binomial name
- Psephenus falli Casey, 1893

Synonyms
- Psephenus calaveras Blaisdell, 1923; Psephenus lanei Blaisdell, 1923; Psephenus veluticollis Casey, 1893

Species of beetle

Psephenus falli is a species of water penny beetle in the family Psephenidae. It is found on the west coast of North America.
