= Dicranopselaphus variegatus =

Scientific classification
- Domain: Eukaryota
- Kingdom: Animalia
- Phylum: Arthropoda
- Class: Insecta
- Order: Coleoptera
- Suborder: Polyphaga
- Infraorder: Elateriformia
- Family: Psephenidae
- Genus: Dicranopselaphus
- Species: D. variegatus

Binomial name
- Dicranopselaphus variegatus Horn, 1880

Synonyms
- Alabameubria starki Brown, 1980

Species of beetle

Dicranopselaphus variegatus, the variegated false water penny beetle, is a species of water penny beetle in the family Psephenidae. It is found in North America.
