= Foster, Oregon =

Unincorporated community in the state of Oregon, United States

- Unincorporated community
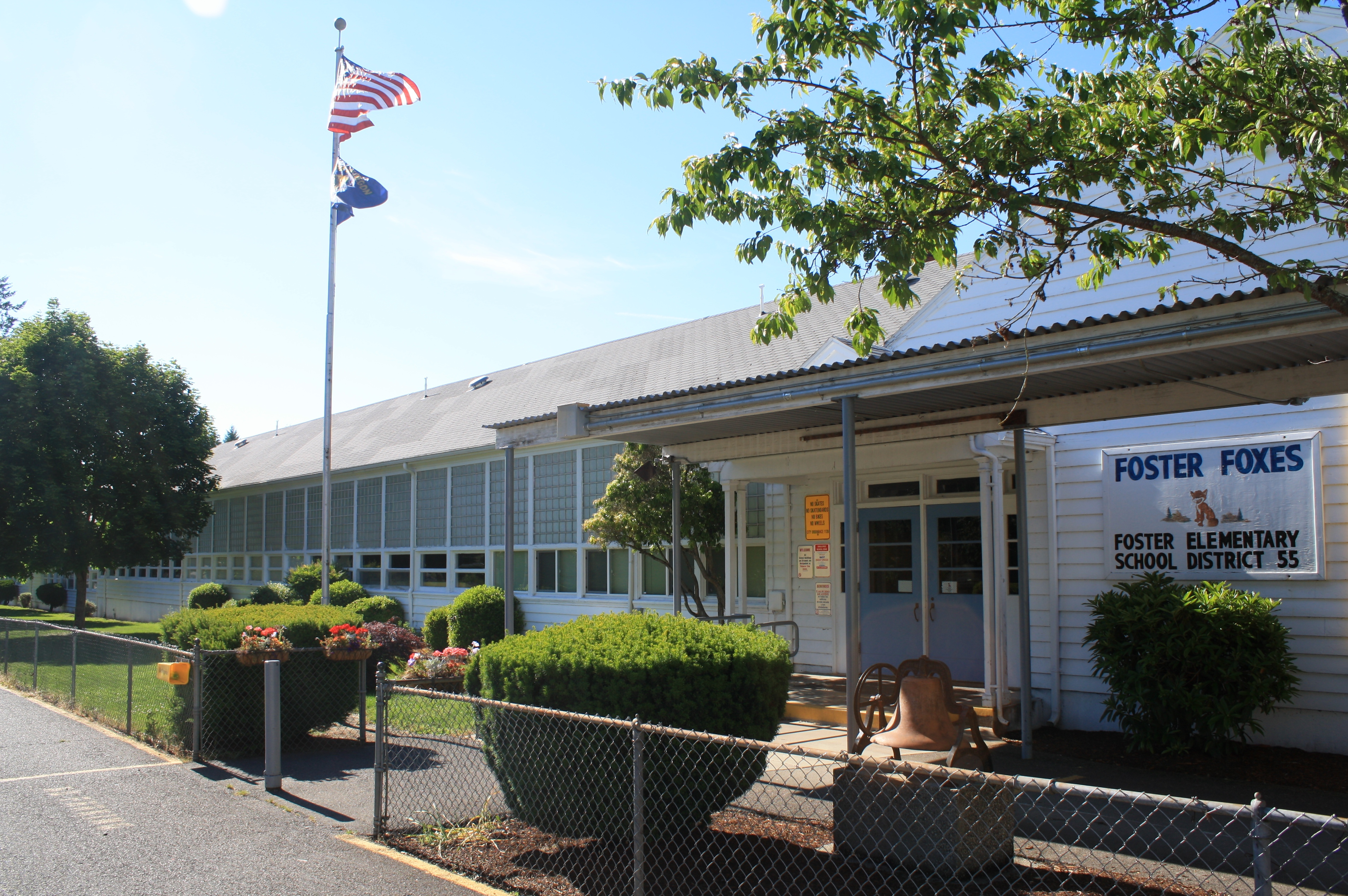
- Foster Elementary School

- Location within Oregon Location within the United States
- Coordinates: 44°24′37″N 122°40′20″W
- Country: United States
- State: Oregon
- County: Linn
- Elevation: 591 ft (180 m)
- Time zone: UTC-8 (Pacific (PST))
  - Summer (DST): UTC-7 (PDT)
- ZIP codes: 97345
- GNIS feature ID: 1136299

Foster is an unincorporated community partly within the city of Sweet Home in Linn County, Oregon. It is located on the western end of the Foster Reservoir. A post office named Foster serves ZIP code 97345, which serves areas beyond the Sweet Home city limits on both the north and south sides of Foster Lake: on the north side, the area extends along the Middle Santiam River to the west end of Green Peter Lake; on the south, the area extends for several miles along the South Santiam River and U.S. Route 20.

== Climate ==
This region experiences warm and dry summers, with no average monthly temperatures above 71.6 °F. According to the Köppen Climate Classification system, Foster has a warm-summer Mediterranean climate, abbreviated "CSB" on climate maps.
