= Acneus oregonensis =

Scientific classification
- Kingdom: Animalia
- Phylum: Arthropoda
- Clade: Pancrustacea
- Class: Insecta
- Order: Coleoptera
- Suborder: Polyphaga
- Infraorder: Elateriformia
- Family: Psephenidae
- Genus: Acneus
- Species: A. oregonensis

Binomial name
- Acneus oregonensis Fender, 1951

Species of beetle

Acneus oregonensis is a species of water penny beetle in the family Psephenidae. It is known to occur in Oregon and was described from a specimen collected at Multnomah Falls.

The holotype, an adult male, measures 3.5 mm (0.14 in) in length.
