= Foster Dam =

Coordinates: 44.416514°N 122.669251°W

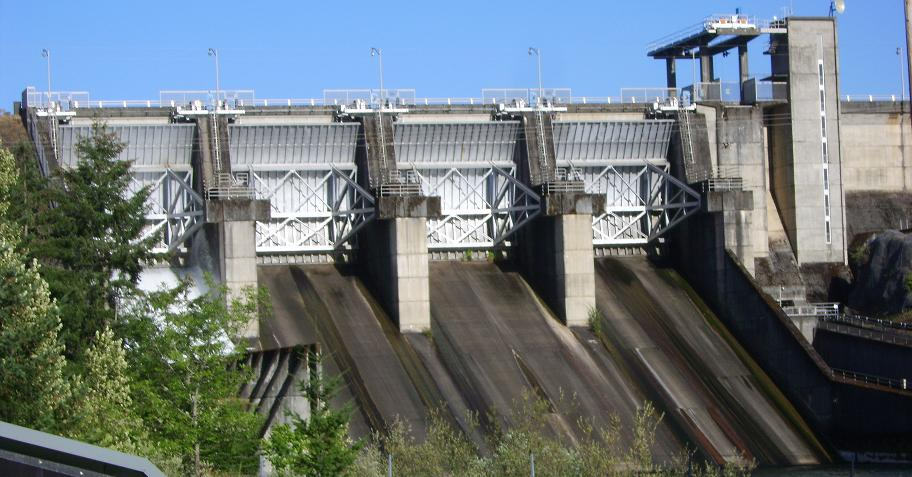
- Foster Dam in 2009
- Interactive map of Foster Dam
- Official name: Foster Dam
- Location: Linn County, Oregon, USA
- Opening date: 1968

Dam and spillways
- Impounds: South Santiam River
- Height: 126 ft (221 m)
- Length: 4565 ft (379 m)

Reservoir
- Creates: Foster Lake
- Total capacity: 28,300 acre⋅ft (0.0349 km^{3})

Power Station
- Turbines: 2
- Installed capacity: 20 MW
- Website web.archive.org/web/20090625042352/http://www.nwp.usace.army.mil/op/v/proj_gpfoster.asp

Foster Dam is an embankment type rock-fill dam across the South Santiam River near Sweet Home, Oregon, United States.

Designed by the Corps of Engineers, it began service on August 22, 1968. Its primary purpose is flood control but it also provides power, navigation improvement downstream and irrigation. The damming of the river created Foster Reservoir, which is a popular fishing and water sports area. The reservoir stores 28,300 acre-feet (34,900,000 m^{3}). The powerhouse has two generators with a capacity totaling 20 MW. The dam regulates water flow from the main facility, Green Peter Dam.

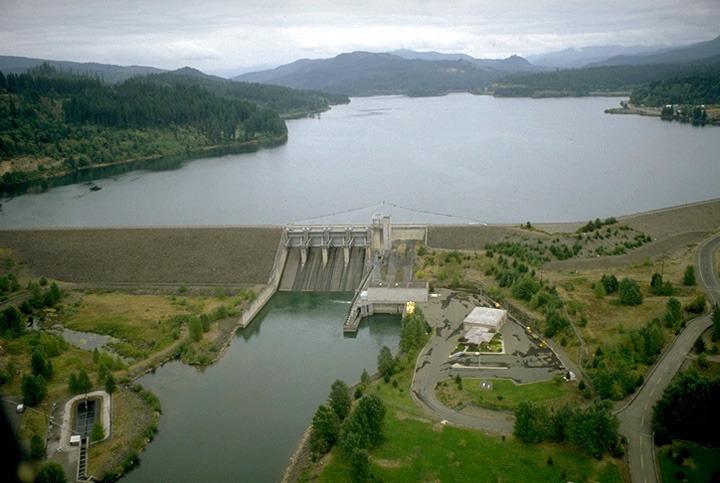
Aerial view of the dam

== Risk to fish ==
The Pacific Northwest National Laboratory tested the likely effects of the dam on fish populations using the sensor fish.

They concluded that all fish travelling over the spillway fish weir would probably experience a minimum of one significantly stressful event. This is due to the absence of a cushioning effect due to the shallow flow depth and badly formed discharge jet. In fact, most fish would likely experience many events while tumbling down the spillway. Because of the larger size of actual fish, the study concluded that live fish would experience even greater events than the sensor fish. Most injuries sustained by smolt (juvenile salmon) after they had passed through the weir were caused by the weir jet's shallow depth as well as the angle of the jet as it struck the spillway chute.

Over 22% of the sensor fish were damaged or lost in the turbine tests. The devices showed signs of "grinding or squeezing". It is assumed that this happened while being compressed when travelling between the blades of the turbine.

Although turbine pressures were similar to Kaplan turbines at the Snake River dams and Columbia River dams, significant events were recorded by the sensor fish occurred at a rate 2-3 times more frequently at the Foster Dam. Rates of injury and mortality for live fish were correspondingly higher.

When comparing the two passage routes, data show that fish travelling over the weir experienced greater event magnitudes than fish travelling through the turbine. This is because of the eventual impact the fish experienced at the spillway chute. The study suggests that possible spillway weir design changes and increasing the depth of flow would improve fish safety.

== See also ==
- List of dams in Oregon
