= Eubrianax =

Scientific classification
- Kingdom: Animalia
- Phylum: Arthropoda
- Class: Insecta
- Order: Coleoptera
- Suborder: Polyphaga
- Infraorder: Elateriformia
- Family: Psephenidae
- Subfamily: Eubrianacinae
- Genus: Eubrianax; Kiesenwetter, 1874

Genus of beetles

Eubrianax is a genus of water penny beetles in the family Psephenidae. There are about 12 described species in Eubrianax.

== Species ==
These 12 species belong to the genus Eubrianax:

- Eubrianax edwardsii (LeConte, 1874)
- Eubrianax granicollis Lewis, 1895
- Eubrianax illiesi Sato
- Eubrianax manakikikuse Sato, 1964
- Eubrianax meridianus Lee, Sato & Yang, 1999
- Eubrianax niger Lee & Yang, 1990
- Eubrianax nobuoi Sato, 1965
- Eubrianax pellucidus Lewis, 1895
- Eubrianax ramicornis Kiesenwetter, 1874
- Eubrianax secretus (Lee, Sato & Yang, 1999)
- Eubrianax serratus Lee, Yang & Sato, 2001
- Eubrianax tarokoensis Lee & Yang, 1990
