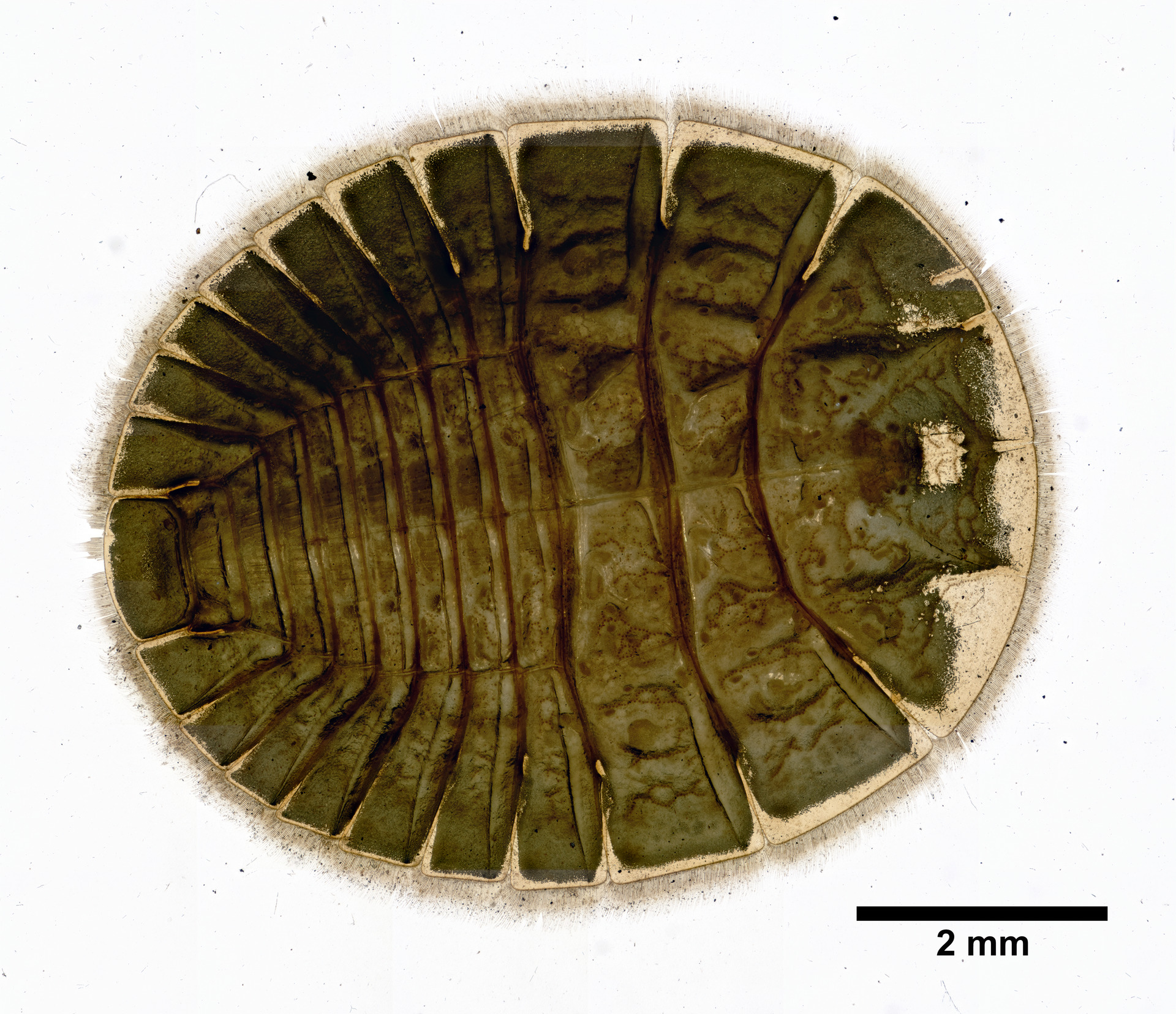
- Psephenus herricki

Scientific classification
- Kingdom: Animalia
- Phylum: Arthropoda
- Class: Insecta
- Order: Coleoptera
- Suborder: Polyphaga
- Infraorder: Elateriformia
- Family: Psephenidae
- Subfamily: Psepheninae
- Genus: Psephenus; Haldeman, 1853

= Psephenus =

Genus of beetles

Psephenus is a genus of water penny beetles in the family Psephenidae. There are about 13 described species in Psephenus.

== Species ==
These 13 species belong to the genus Psephenus:

- Psephenus arizonensis Brown & Murvosh, 1974
- Psephenus falli Casey, 1893
- Psephenus haldemani Horn, 1870
- Psephenus herricki (Dekay, 1844)
- Psephenus lutulentus Scudder, 1900
- Psephenus minckleyi Brown & Murvosh, 1974
- Psephenus montanus Brown & Murvosh, 1974
- Psephenus murvoshi Brown, 1970
- Psephenus oresbius Spangler, 1968
- Psephenus palpalis Champion, 1913
- Psephenus spangleri
- Psephenus texanus Brown & Arrington, 1967 (Texas water penny)
- Psephenus usingeri Hinton, 1934
