= Cascadia County Park =

County park in Oregon, United States

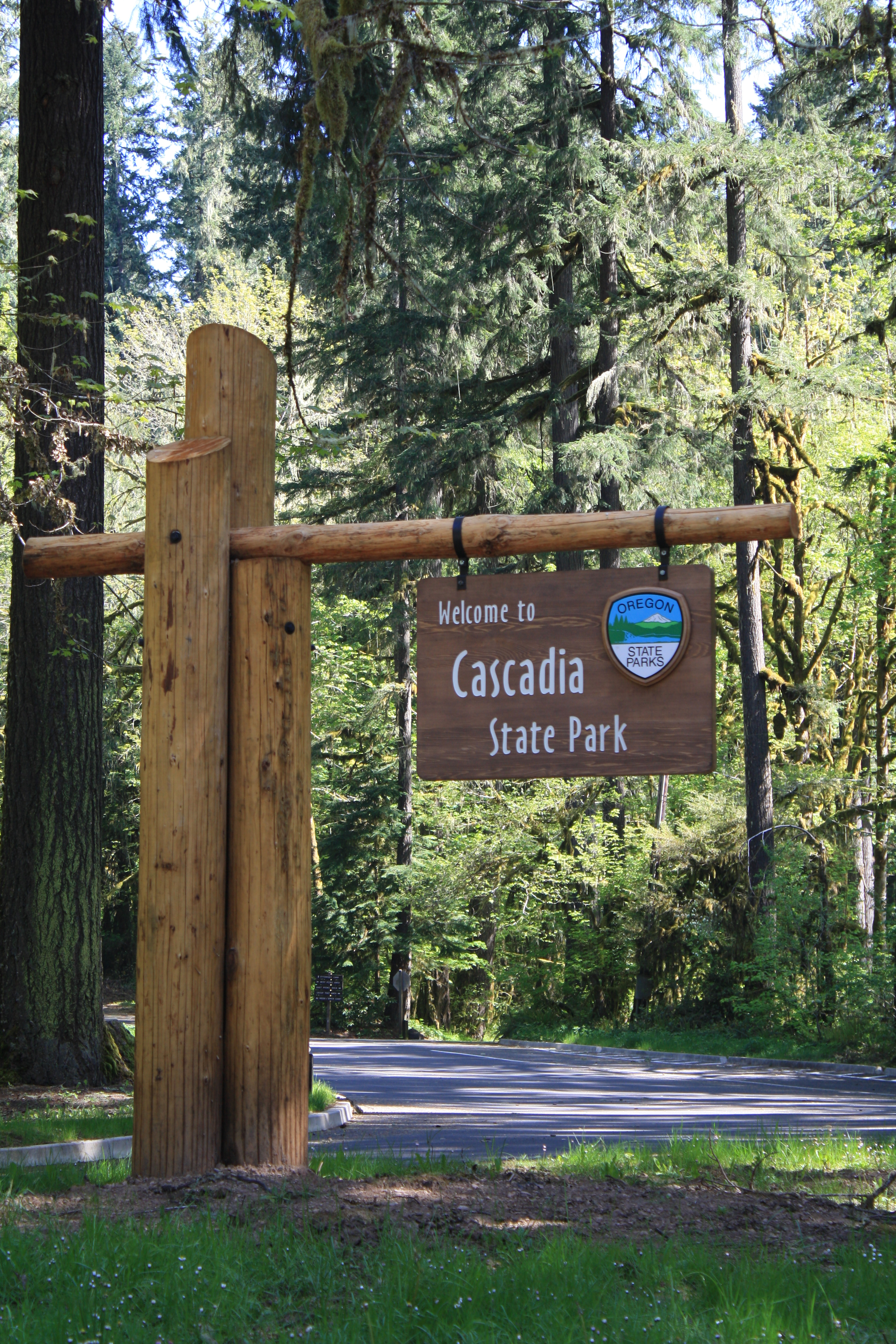
- Park entrance

- Location within Oregon Location within the United States
- Interactive map of Cascadia County Park
- Type: Public, County
- Location: Linn County, Oregon
- Nearest city: Cascadia
- Coordinates: 44°23′53″N 122°28′22″W
- Operator: Oregon Parks and Recreation Department

Cascadia County Park (formerly Cascadia State Park) is a park in the U.S. state of Oregon near Sweet Home along the South Santiam River at Cascadia. The park includes a day use area, campsites, hiking trails and 150 foot Lower Soda Creek Falls.

== History ==
Prior to settlers arriving, groups from the Molalla and Kalapuya tribes visited the park site to harvest huckleberries, fish and hunt. Cascadia Cave is nearby. The cave is an 8,000-year-old American Indian petroglyph site considered to have the largest concentration of rock engravings in western Oregon.

Willamette Valley settlers developed a bypass at the park site for horse-drawn wagons. Old wagon ruts are still visible near where Soda Creek meets the South Santiam River.

In 1896, George Geisendorfer opened a resort to capitalize on what he called the "curative powers" of Soda Creek's mineral spring water. The resort included a hotel, tennis courts, croquet course, garden and bowling alley. The hotel later burned and the property was acquired by the state of Oregon in 1940.

Cascadia was a State Park until September 2022, when ownership was transferred to Linn County, Oregon which had been managing the park for the previous 3 years.

== Hiking trails ==
Cascadia County Park includes two primary hiking trails. The one mile Soda Creek Falls Trail follows Soda Creek to Lower Soda Creek Falls. The 3/4 mile loop River Trail descends to the South Santiam River.

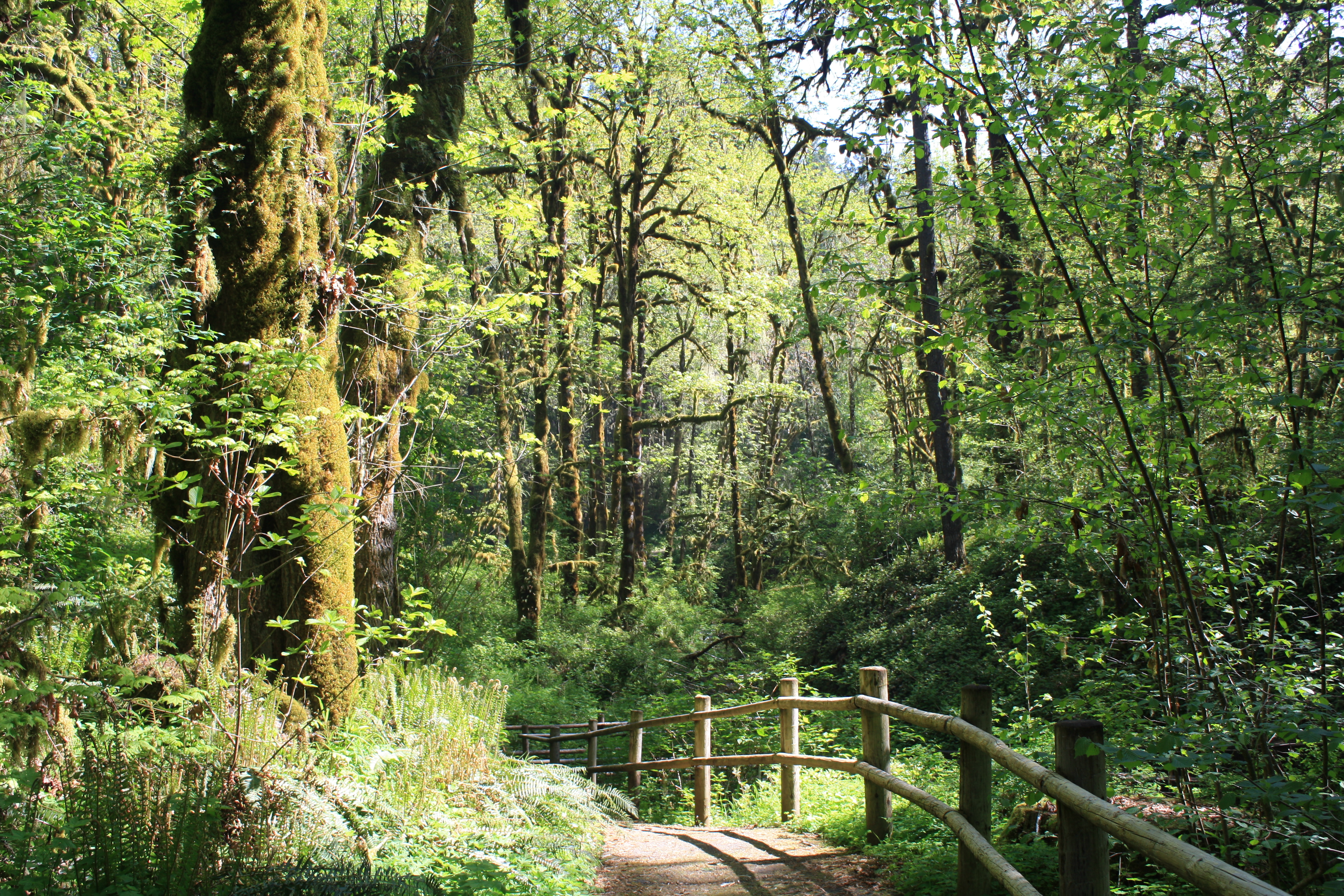
River Trail at Cascadia County Park.

== Flora ==
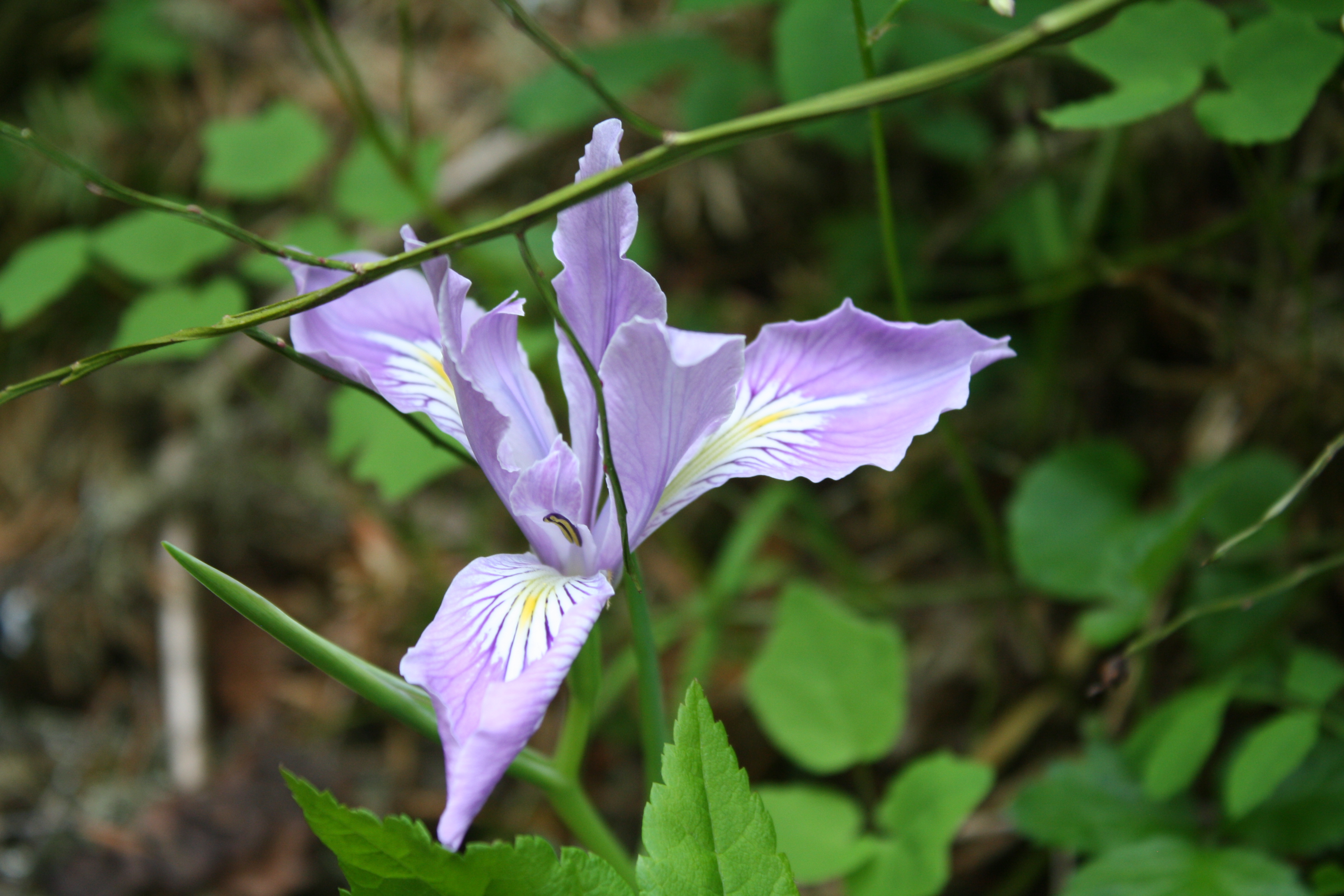
Oregon Iris at Cascadia County Park.

A forest canopy of Douglas-Fir, cedar and hemlock shades the ground, encouraging the growth of ferns, mosses and mushroom species. Wildflowers include Oregon trout lily, fairy slipper, western trillium, camas, fawn lily, Hooker's fairy bells, snow queen, false Solomon's-seal, stream violet, Oregon Iris and Pacific bleeding heart.

== Access ==
The park is located along U.S. Highway 20 14 miles east of Sweet Home and 59 miles west of Sisters.

== Gallery ==
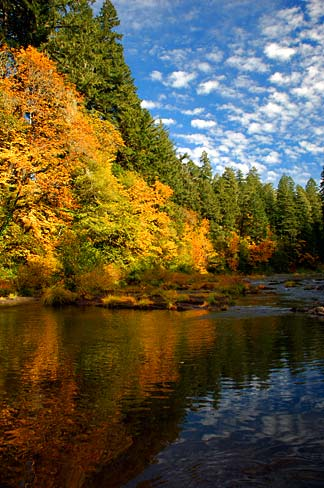
Autumn colors at Cascadia County Park on the South Santiam River.

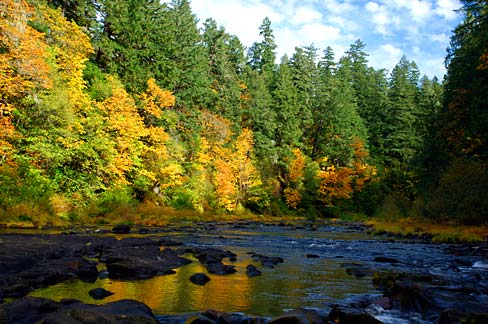
The South Santiam River at Cascadia County Park.

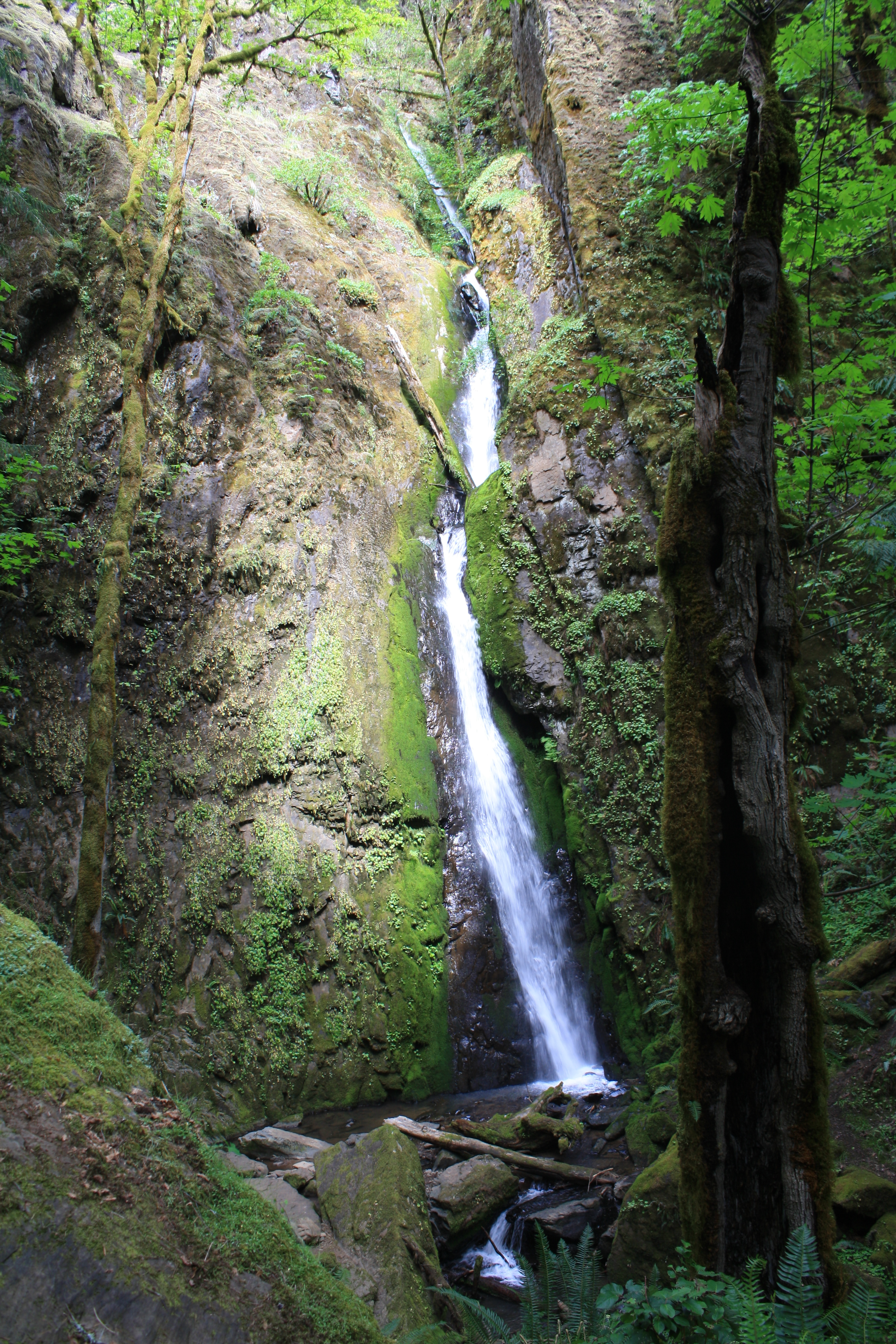
Soda Creek Falls at Cascadia County Park.

== See also ==
- List of Oregon state parks
- Cascadia, Oregon
