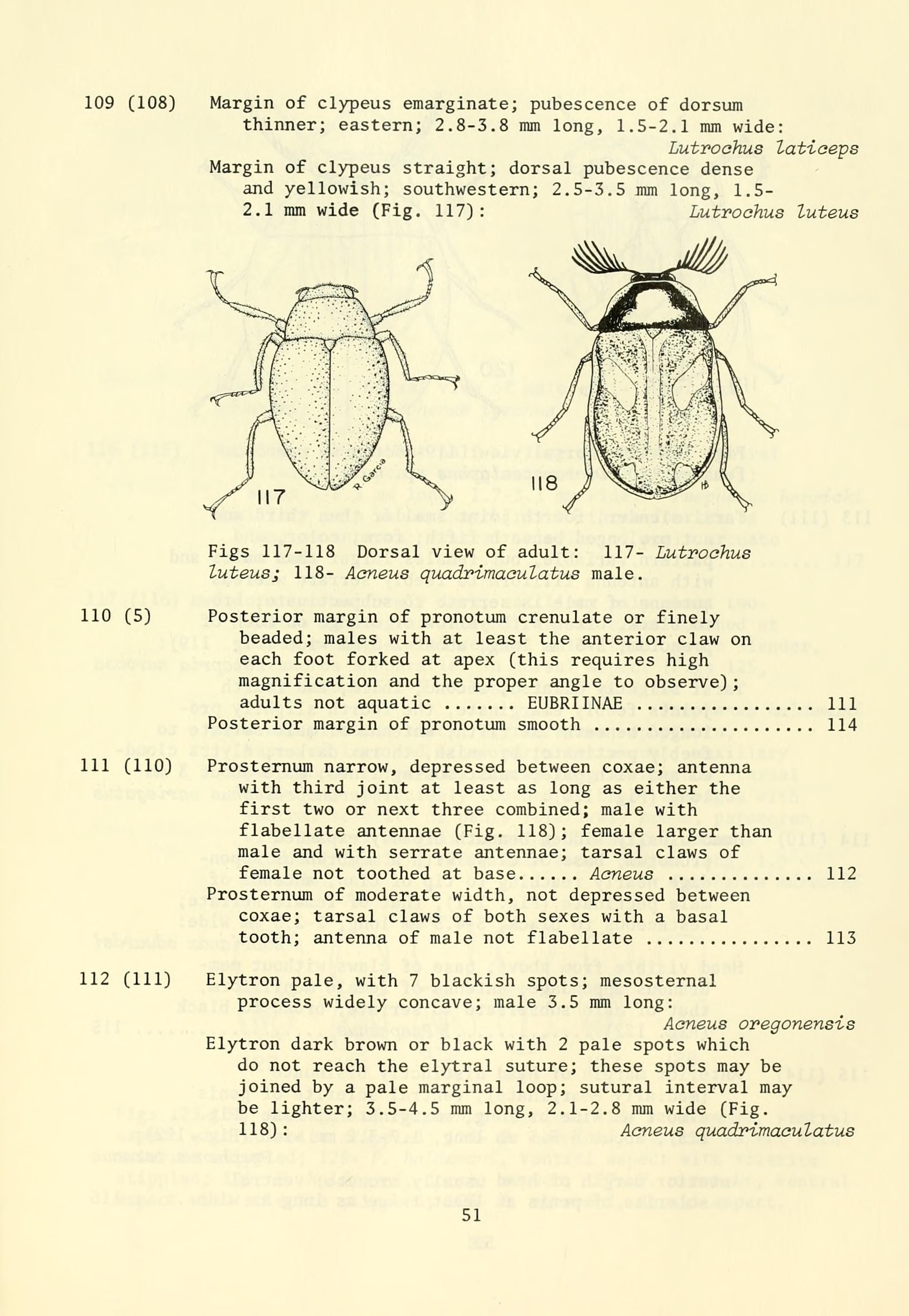
- Adult Acneus quadrimaculatus (right)

Scientific classification
- Kingdom: Animalia
- Phylum: Arthropoda
- Class: Insecta
- Order: Coleoptera
- Suborder: Polyphaga
- Infraorder: Elateriformia
- Family: Psephenidae
- Subfamily: Eubriinae
- Genus: Acneus; Horn, 1880

= Acneus =

Genus of beetles

Acneus is a genus of water-penny beetles in the family Psephenidae.

== Species ==
These four species belong to the genus Acneus:

- Acneus beeri Hatch, 1961
- Acneus burnelli (Fender, 1962)
- Acneus oregonensis Fender, 1951
- Acneus quadrimaculatus Horn, 1880
