= Green Peter Dam =

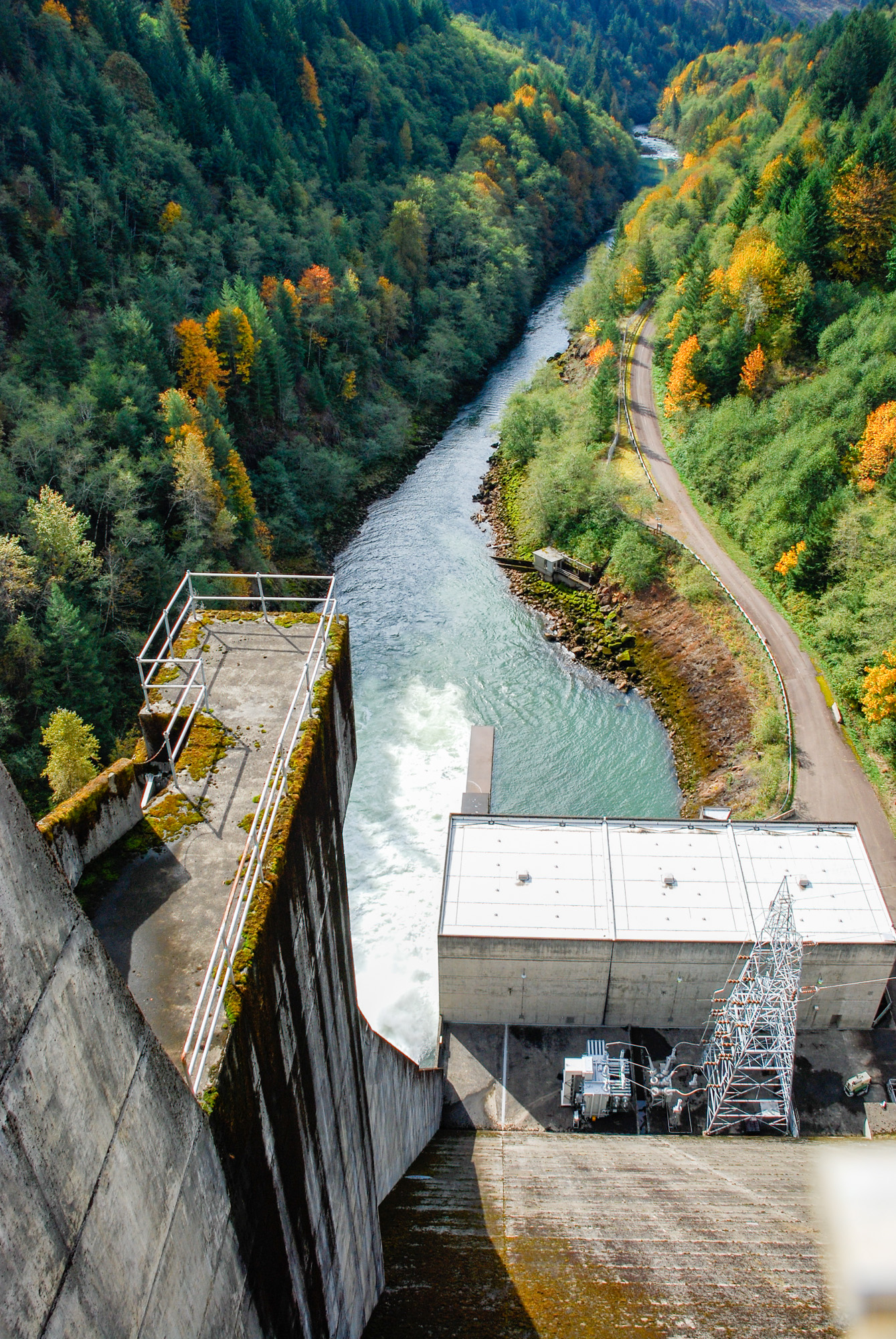
- Green Peter Dam looking downstream
- Official name: Green Peter Dam
- Location: Linn County, Oregon, U.S.
- Coordinates: 44.4501°N 122.5491°W
- Opening date: 1967

Dam and spillways
- Impounds: Middle Santiam River
- Height: 327 feet (100 m)
- Length: 1,500 feet (460 m)

Reservoir
- Creates: Green Peter Reservoir
- Total capacity: 312,500 acre-feet (385,500,000 m^{3})

Power Station
- Turbines: 2
- Installed capacity: 80 MW
- Website https://web.archive.org/web/20090625042352/http://www.nwp.usace.army.mil/op/v/proj_gpfoster.asp

Green Peter Dam is a concrete gravity dam impounding the Middle Santiam River in Linn County in the U.S. state of Oregon. It was completed in 1967 to generate hydroelectricity, prevent flood damage, provide irrigation, and improve water quality downstream. It has been leaking for many years but is considered to be safe by authorities. Water released by the dam is regulated by the Foster Dam 7 miles (11 km) down the river.

Green Peter Reservoir, created by the dam, is a popular area for fishing, boating, and other water sports.

The dam is featured in the 2013 film Night Moves.

== See also ==
- List of lakes in Oregon
