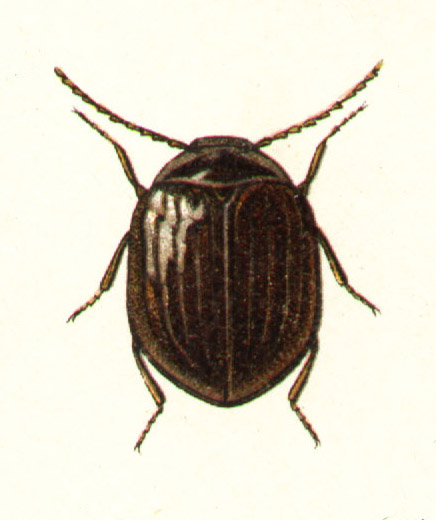
- Eubria palustris

Scientific classification
- Kingdom: Animalia
- Phylum: Arthropoda
- Class: Insecta
- Order: Coleoptera
- Suborder: Polyphaga
- Infraorder: Elateriformia
- Family: Psephenidae
- Genus: Eubria; Latreille, 1829

= Eubria =

Genus of beetles

Eubria is a genus of beetles in the family Psephenidae.

Species include:

- * Eubria mesoamericana - Found in Costa Rica and Panama
- * Eubria palustris
