= Middle Santiam River =

Tributary of the South Santiam River in America

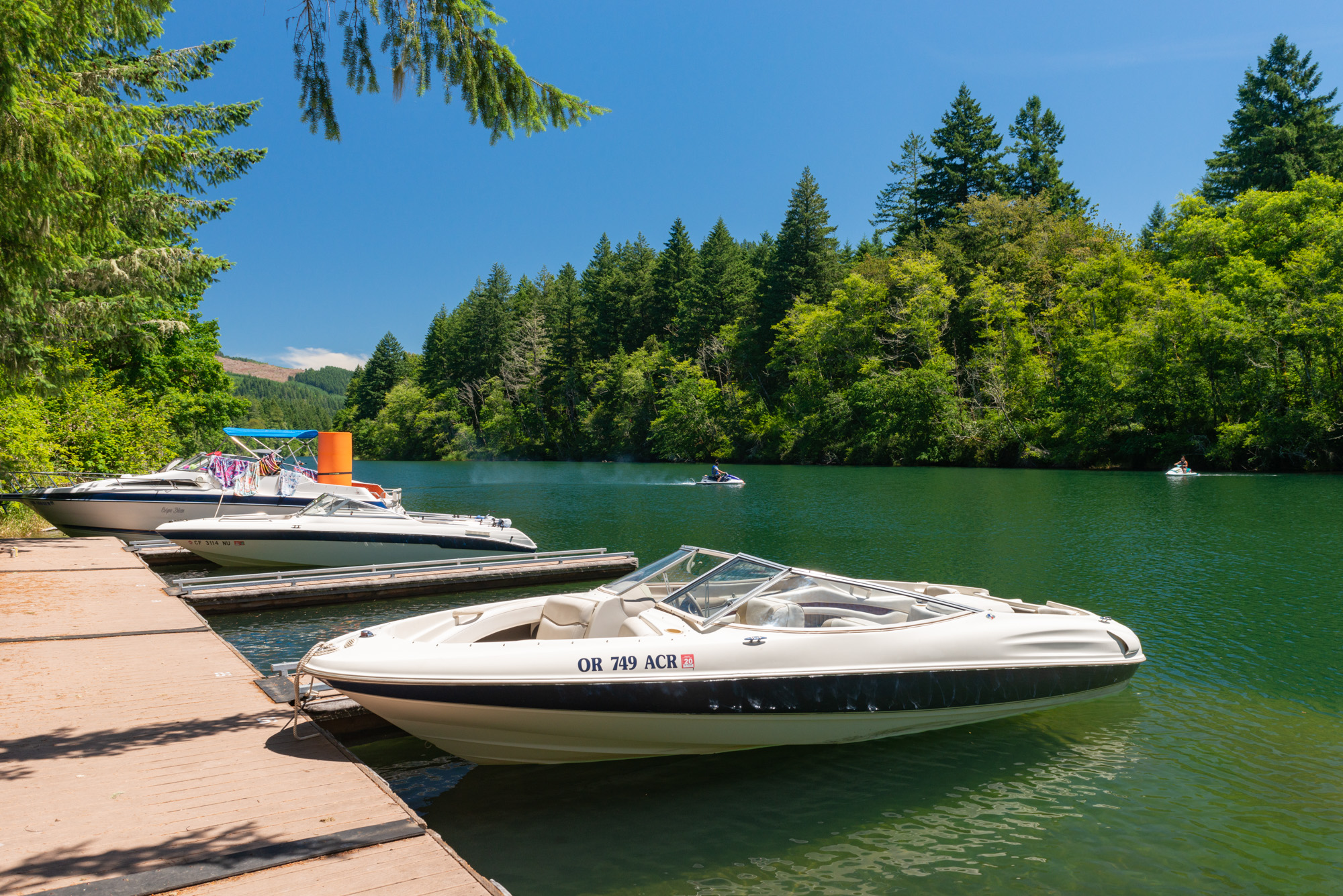
- Sunnyside County Park on the Middle Santiam River.

- Location of the mouth of the Middle Santiam River in Oregon
- Etymology: Kalapuya tribe that lived near the river until removal to the Grande Ronde Reservation

Location
- Country: United States
- State: Oregon
- County: Linn

Physical characteristics
- Source: Iron Mountain
  - location: Cascade Range, Willamette National Forest, Linn County, Oregon
  - coordinates: 44°24′09″N 122°09′43″W
  - elevation: 4,149 ft (1,265 m)
- Mouth: South Santiam River
  - location: Foster Reservoir, Linn County, Oregon
  - coordinates: 44°24′58″N 122°38′02″W
  - elevation: 640 ft (200 m)
- Length: 39 mi (63 km)
- Basin size: 104 sq mi (270 km^{2})

The Middle Santiam River is a tributary of the South Santiam River, 38.5 miles (62.0 km) long, in western Oregon in the United States. It drains a remote area of the Cascade Range east of Sweet Home in the watershed of the Willamette River.

It rises in the Cascades in eastern Linn County in the Willamette National Forest, about half a mile west of Iron Mountain. It flows briefly north, then generally west and southwest through the mountains and Middle Santiam Wilderness. In central Linn County it is impounded at the Green Peter Dam to form the Green Peter Reservoir. Approximately 4 miles (6 km) downstream from the dam it joins the South Santiam from the northeast as an arm of Foster Reservoir.

location	geolocation	usgs map
mouth, Foster Lake	44.416235°N 122.633972°W	Sweet Home
junction Quartzville Creek; Green Peter Lake	44.476235°N 122.500638°W	Cascadia
RM 15.4	44.500401°N 122.395636°W	Yellowstone Mountain
RM 25.3	44.517068°N 122.250632°W	Chimney Peak
source	44.402623°N 122.162015°W	Harter Mountain

== Tributaries ==
Named tributaries of the Middle Santiam River from source to mouth are Cougar, Holman, Lake, South Pyramid, Bachelor, Pyramid, Donaca, Jude, and Egg creeks, followed by Fitt, Chimney, Sixes, Bear, and Twin Falls creeks. Below that are Cougar, Crash, Maple, Elk, Knickerbocker and Cave creeks. Then come Tally, Quartzville, Whitcomb, Rumbaugh, and Thistle creeks. Finally are Green Peter, Little Bottom, Alder, Coal, and Lewis creeks.

== See also ==
- List of Oregon rivers
- Willamette Riverkeeper
