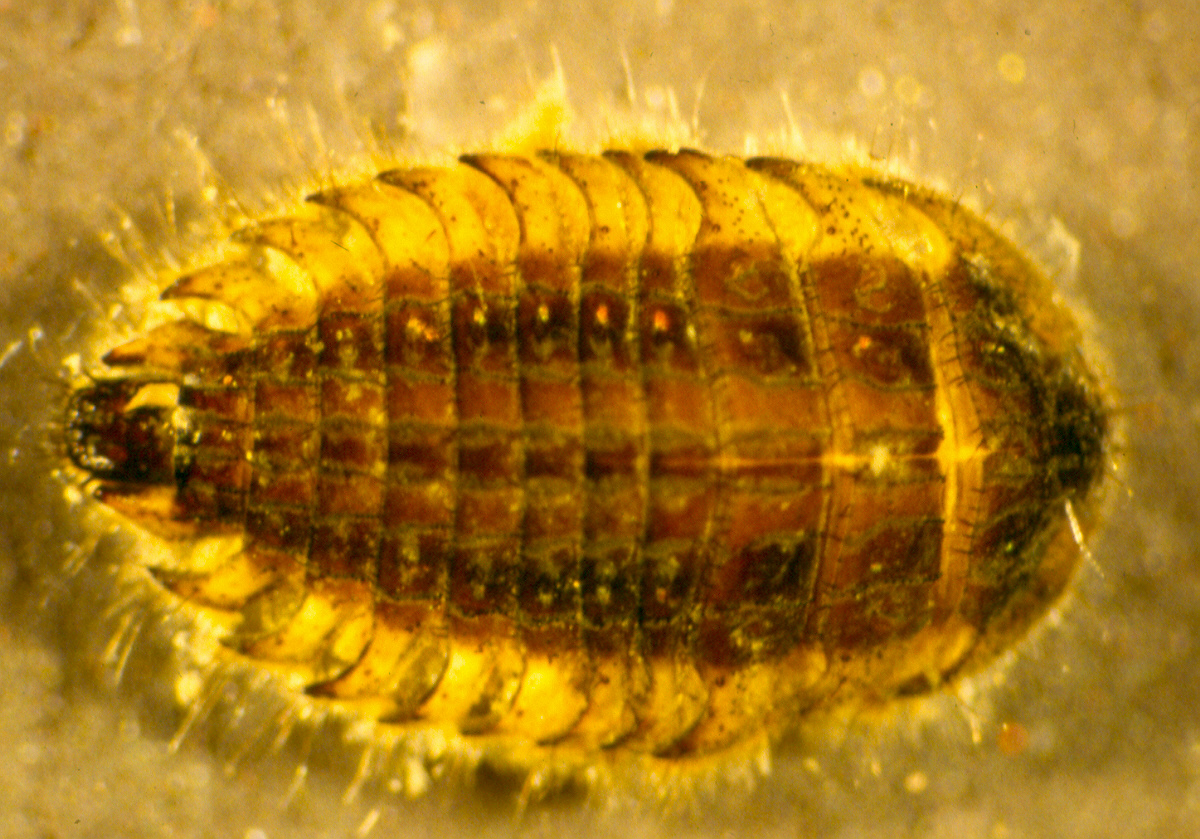
- Dorsal view of Ectopria sp. beetle larva

Scientific classification
- Kingdom: Animalia
- Phylum: Arthropoda
- Class: Insecta
- Order: Coleoptera
- Suborder: Polyphaga
- Infraorder: Elateriformia
- Family: Psephenidae
- Subfamily: Eubriinae
- Genus: Ectopria; LeConte, 1853

= Ectopria =

Genus of beetles

Ectopria is a genus of water penny beetles in the family Psephenidae. There are about nine described species in Ectopria.

== Species ==
These species belong to the genus Ectopria:

- Ectopria hsui Lee & Yang, 1994
- Ectopria laticollis Wickham, 1913
- Ectopria leechi Brigham, 1981
- Ectopria nervosa (Melsheimer, 1845)
- Ectopria opaca (Kiesenwetter, 1874)
- Ectopria reticulata Champion, 1897
- Ectopria tachikawai (Satô, 1968)
- Ectopria vermiculata Champion, 1897
