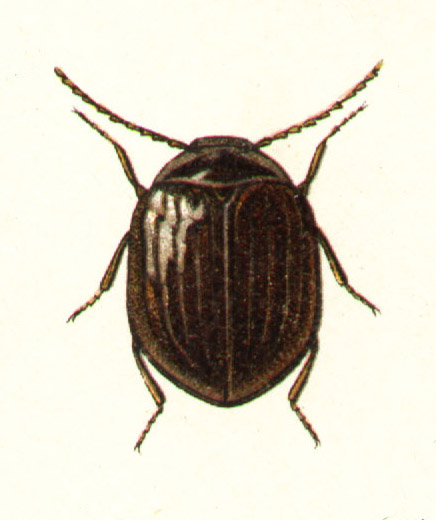

Scientific classification
- Domain: Eukaryota
- Kingdom: Animalia
- Phylum: Arthropoda
- Class: Insecta
- Order: Coleoptera
- Suborder: Polyphaga
- Infraorder: Elateriformia
- Family: Psephenidae
- Genus: Eubria
- Species: E. palustris

Binomial name
- Eubria palustris (Germar, 1818)

= Eubria palustris =

Species of beetle

Eubria palustris is a species of beetle belonging to the family Psephenidae.

It is native to Europe.

Synonyms:

- Cyphon palustris Germar, 1818
- Eubria marchantiae Jacquelin du Val, 1854
