= Green Peter Reservoir =

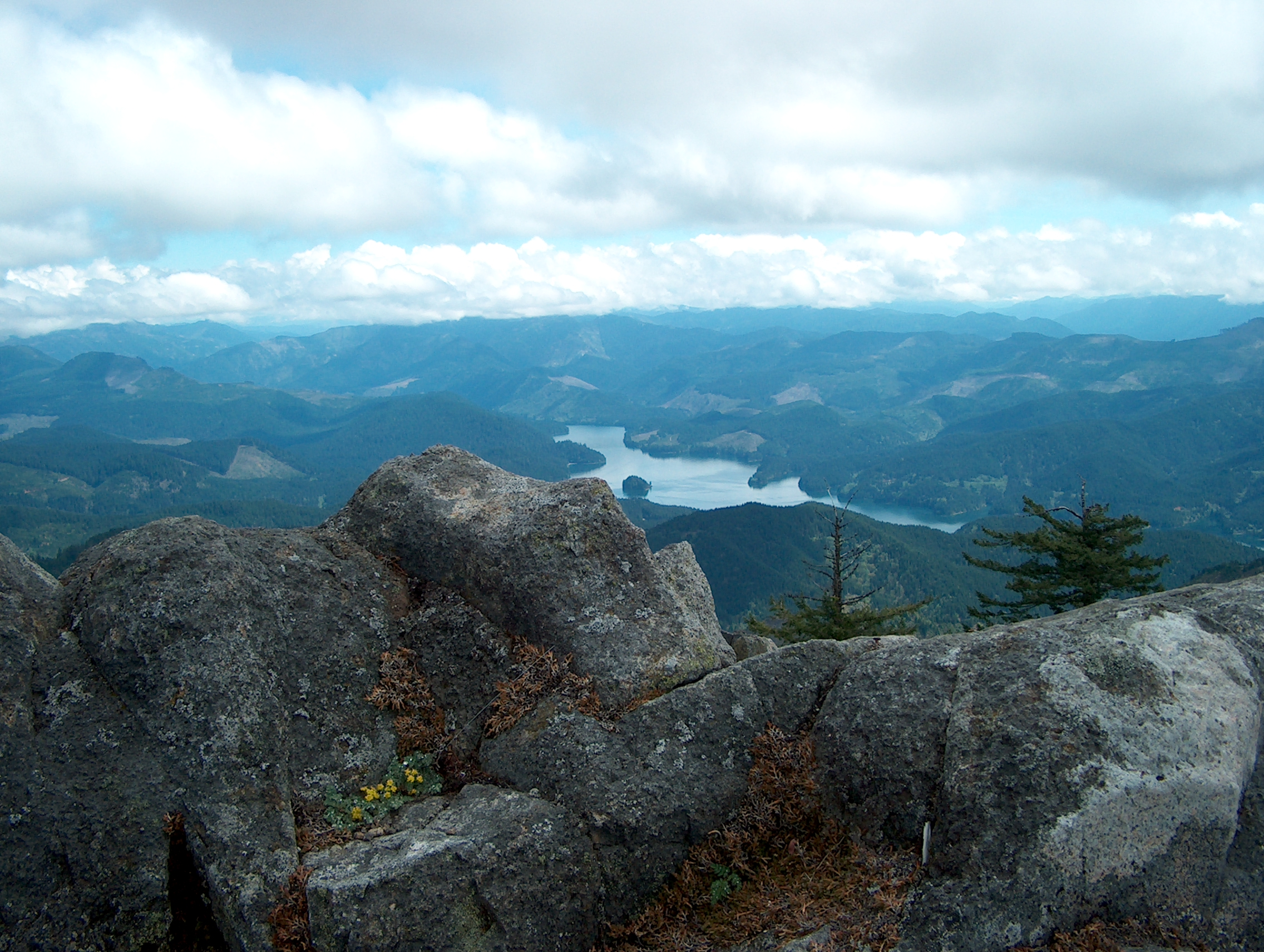

- Location within Oregon Location within the United States
- Location: Linn County, Oregon, United States
- Coordinates: 44.452068°N 122.547027°W
- Type: Reservoir
- Catchment area: 277 mi^{2} (720 km^{2})
- Basin countries: United States
- Max. length: 10 mi (16 km)
- Surface area: 3,720 acres (1,510 ha)
- Average depth: 114 ft (35 m)
- Max. depth: 315 ft (96 m)
- Water volume: 430,000 acre⋅ft (530,000 dam^{3})
- Residence time: 4.8 months
- Shore length^{1}: 48 mi (77 km)
- Surface elevation: 1,015 ft (309 m)
- ^{1} Shore length is not a well-defined measure.

Green Peter Reservoir is a reservoir created by Green Peter Dam on the Middle Santiam River 11 miles (18 km) northeast of Sweet Home, Oregon, United States. The reservoir is approximately 10 miles (16 km) long and has a surface area of approximately 3,720 acres (1,510 ha) when full. The reservoir is used for hydropower, recreation, flood risk management, water quality, irrigation, and as a fish and wildlife habitat.

== Recreation ==
Whitcomb Creek Park is a 328-acre (133 ha) rustic park with 77 basic camp sites, 4 pull-through sites, and a boat ramp. Whitcomb Creek Park also has a separate group camping area that holds up to 100 people.

Thistle Creek Boat Ramp is on the north shore of the reservoir. It is open year-round, and the boat ramp was extended in 1999 allowing access to the reservoir at winter low pool.

Quartzville Group Camp, roughly 16 miles (26 km) up Quartzville Drive, is available to rent.

Whitcomb Creek Park, Thistle Creek Boat Ramp, and Quartzville Group Camp are operated by Linn County Parks and Recreation.

== See also ==
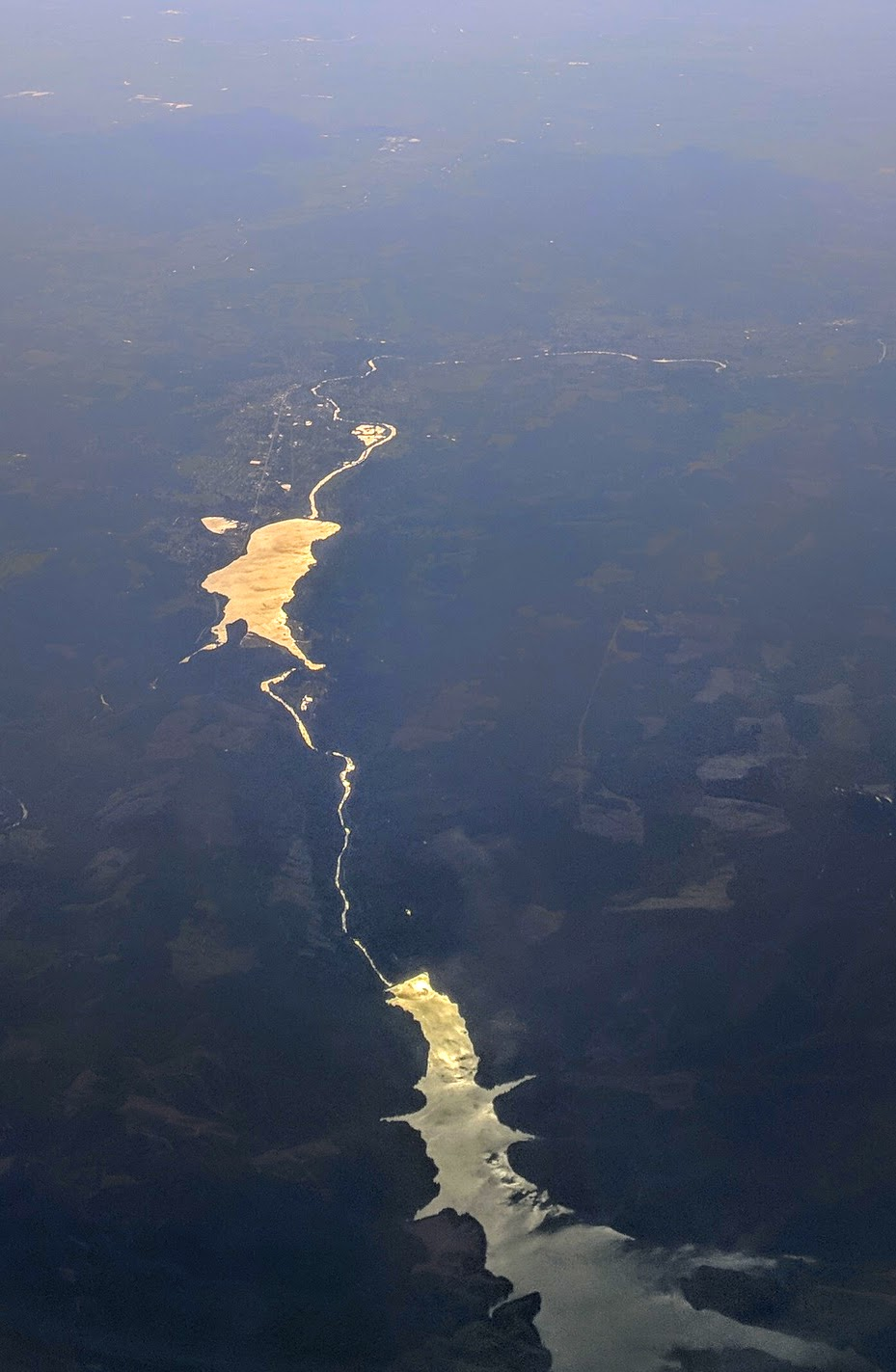
Aerial view of Foster and Green Peter lakes (reservoirs) reflecting the late-afternoon sun

- Foster Reservoir
- List of lakes in Oregon
