= Cascadia, Oregon =

Unincorporated community in Oregon, US

- Census-designated place
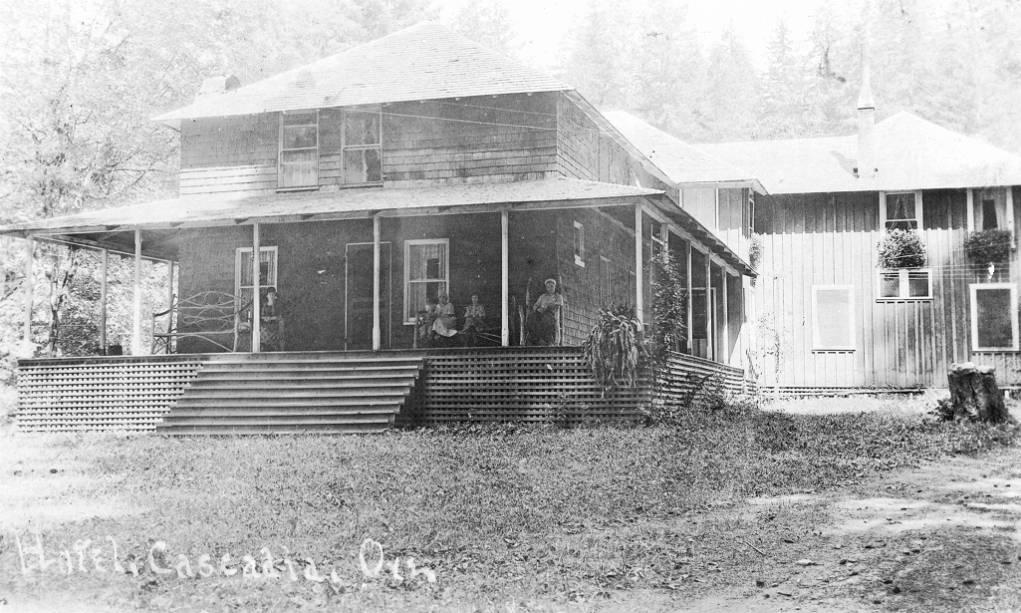
- Hotel in Cascadia, circa 1925

- Location within Oregon Location within the United States
- Coordinates: 44°23′29″N 122°29′26″W
- Country: United States
- State: Oregon
- County: Linn

Area
  - Total: 5.02 sq mi (13.00 km^{2})
  - Land: 5.02 sq mi (13.00 km^{2})
  - Water: 0 sq mi (0.00 km^{2})
- Elevation: 810 ft (250 m)

Population (2020)
  - Total: 134
  - Density: 26.7/sq mi (10.31/km^{2})
- Time zone: UTC-8 (Pacific (PST))
  - Summer (DST): UTC-7 (PDT)
- ZIP codes: 97329, 97345
- FIPS code: 41-11700
- GNIS feature ID: 2584411

Cascadia is an unincorporated community and census-designated place (CDP) that was established in 1892 on the South Santiam River, 14 miles (23 km) east of the current city of Sweet Home, in Linn County, Oregon, United States. As of the 2020 census, Cascadia had a population of 134.

Originally a stage stop on the Santiam Wagon Road, then a summer resort also known as Cascadia Mineral Springs, Cascadia had a post office established in 1898. It maintains a ZIP code of 97329. The resort had a hotel established by George Geisendorfer, who was also the first postmaster. People were attracted to Cascadia because of its mineral spring water. The property was sold to the state in 1940 and now is the site of the 300-acre (1.2 km^{2}) Cascadia State Park.

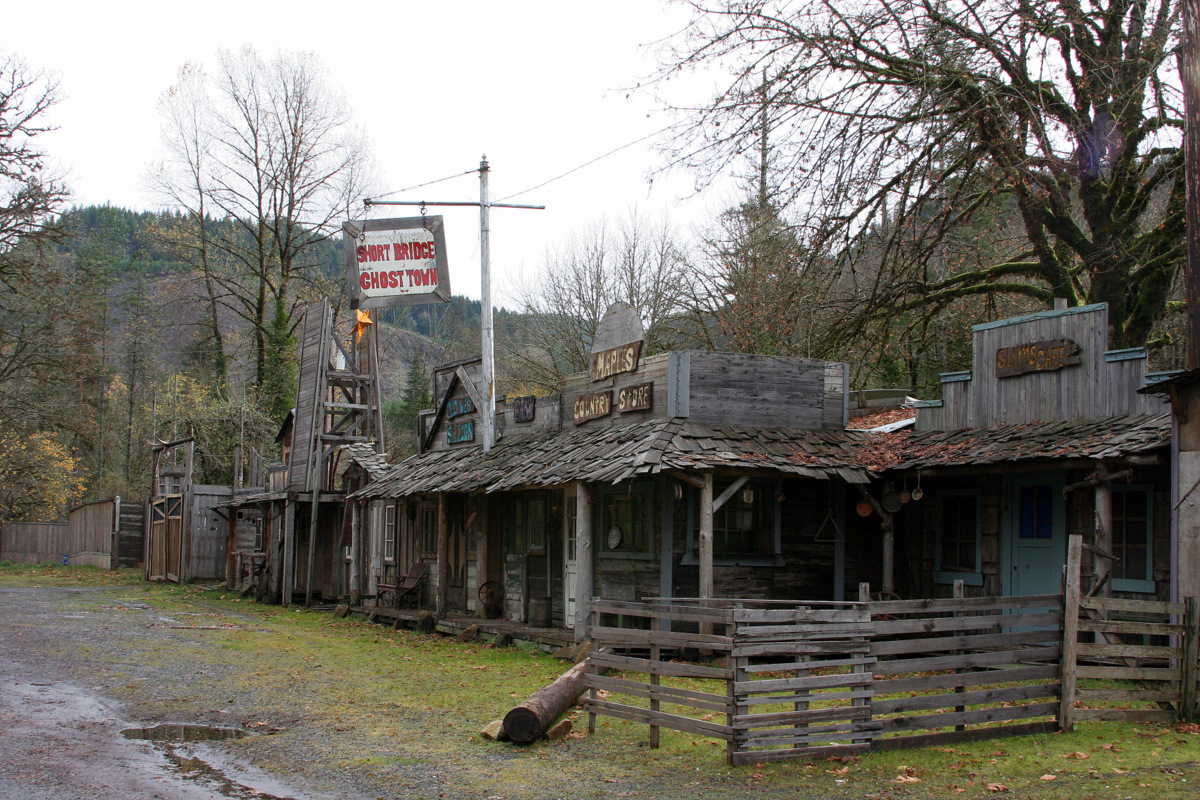
A fence in Cascadia, made to look like an old town. This is also the former location of the Maples Grocery store and gas station.

== Climate ==
This region experiences warm (but not hot) and dry summers, with no average monthly temperatures above 71.6 °F (22.0 °C) According to the Köppen Climate Classification system, Cascadia has a warm-summer Mediterranean climate, abbreviated "Csb" on climate maps.

== Demographics ==
Historical population
Census	Pop.	Note	%±
2020	134		—
U.S. Decennial Census

== Transportation ==
U.S. Route 20 passes through the community, leading west 14 miles (23 km) to Sweet Home and 43 miles (69 km) to Albany, and east over Tombstone Pass 81 miles (130 km) to Bend.

== Cascadia Cave ==
Cascadia Cave is a shallow rock shelter located on private land along the South Santiam River in Cascadia State Park, Oregon. Archeologists used carbon dating from soil in the area to estimate the cave is between 8,000 and 10,000 years old.

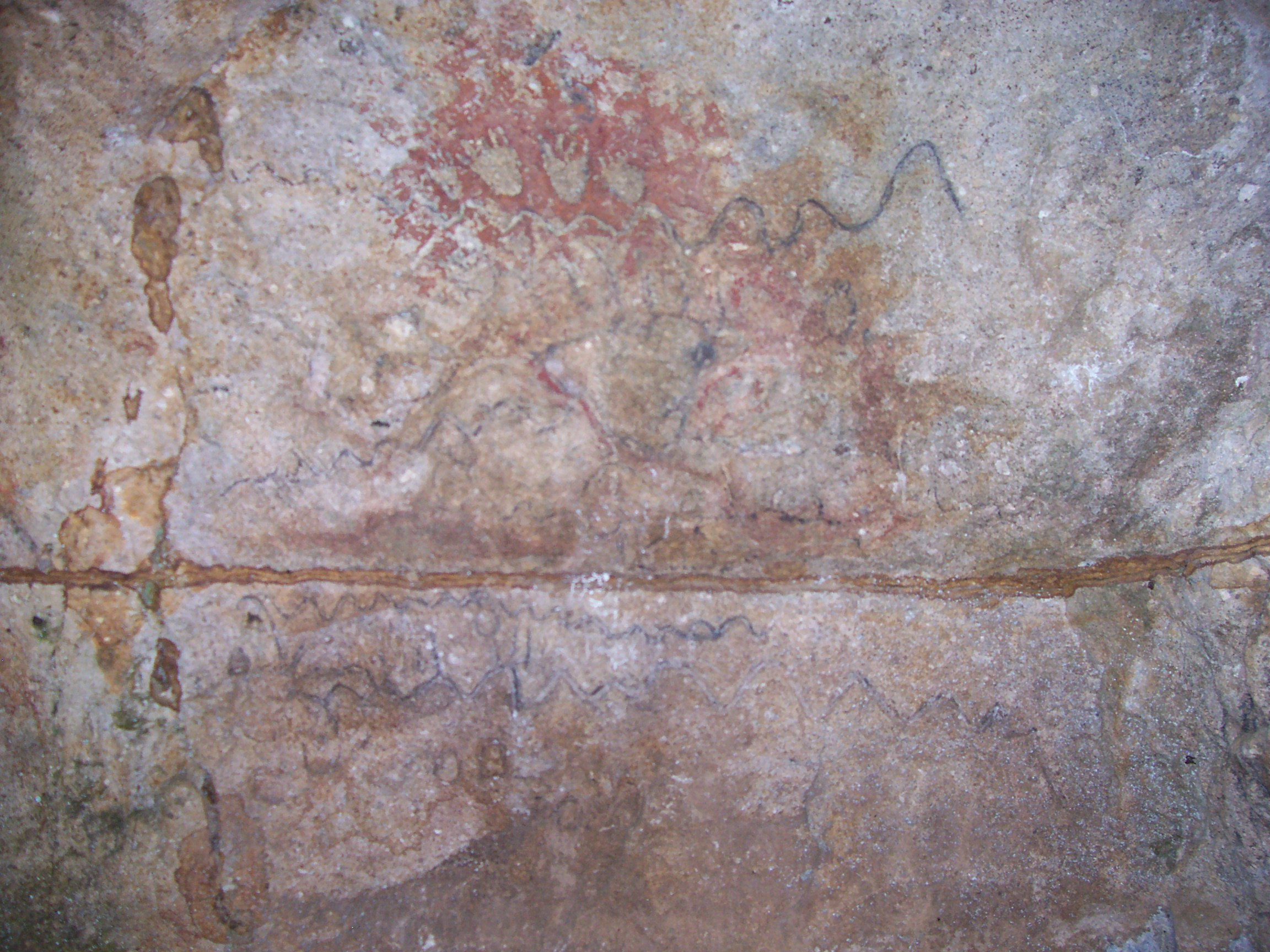

=== History ===
Cascadia Cave is a significant archaeological and cultural site located near the South Santiam River in the Cascade Mountains near Sweet Home, Oregon. Situated east of the Cascadia community and adjacent to Cascadia State Park, the cave is a shallow rock shelter with a pronounced overhang. It holds deep cultural importance for the Santiam Band of the Kalapuya and Molala peoples.

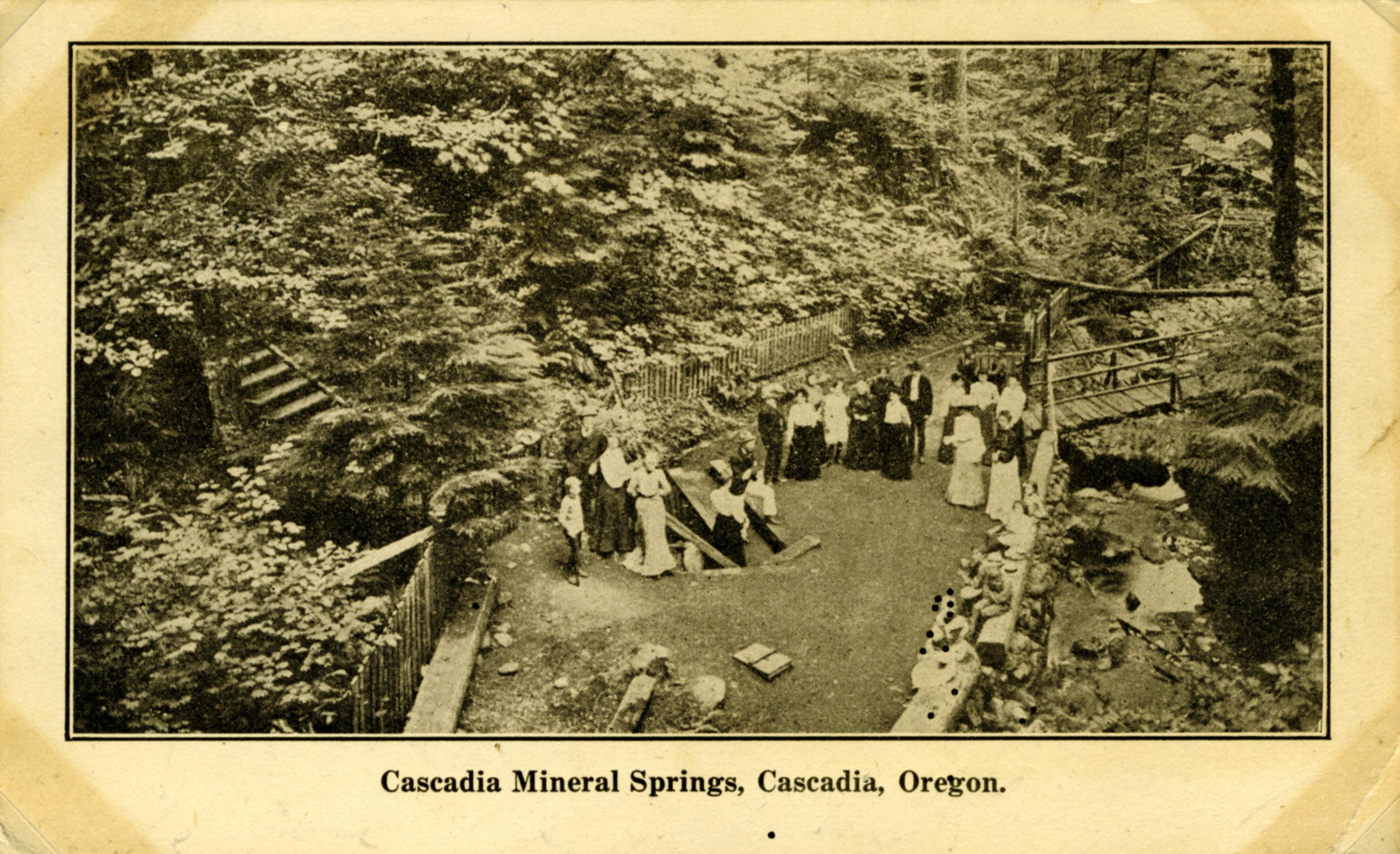
Mineral Springs of Cascadia, Oregon

The South Santiam River was traditionally used as a food source by the Kalapuyan tribe, specifically the Santiam people. The tribe also utilized indigenous plants such as camas, hazelnuts, hops, tarweed, and wild onion that grew in the area.

The cave itself noted for its cultural and practical significance to the tribe as it is located along routes used for trade and travel. The nearby Soda Springs was used for medicinal purposes by the tribes and later was a popular spot for tourism due to the abundance of natural mineral water and springs in the area.

=== Vandalism ===
Cascadia Cave has faced significant threats from vandalism and environmental degradation. Over the years, visitors have carved initials into the walls, applied paint over petroglyphs, and taken rubbings of the rock art, leading to severe scaling and erosion of many petroglyphs. Increased moisture from water pooling near the cave walls has accelerated the deterioration of the artwork.

In response to these challenges, the Confederated Tribes of Grand Ronde, the Confederated Tribes of Siletz Indians, and other tribal entities have collaborated with local and federal agencies to acquire the land from its private owners. In 2022 ownership of Cascadia State Park and the cave was officially transferred to Linn County, with a Grande Ronde Elder, Dietrich Peters, representing the Confederated Tribes of the Grande Ronde during the ceremony.

== See also ==
- Cascadia State Park
- List of ghost towns in Oregon
