= Foster Reservoir =

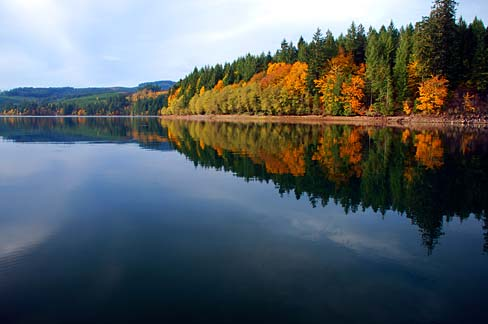

- Location within Oregon Location within the United States
- Location: Foster, Oregon, Linn County, Oregon, United States
- Coordinates: 44°25′00″N 122°40′05″W
- Type: Reservoir
- Basin countries: United States
- Max. length: 3.5 mi (5.6 km)
- Surface area: 1,220 acres (494 ha)
- Surface elevation: 617 ft (188 m)

Foster Reservoir is a reservoir created by Foster Dam on the South Santiam River in the city of Foster, Oregon, United States. The reservoir is approximately 5.6 km (3.5 mi) long and covers approximately 494 ha (1,220 acres) when full. Primary use of the reservoir is recreation in the summer and flood control in the winter and spring.

== Recreation ==
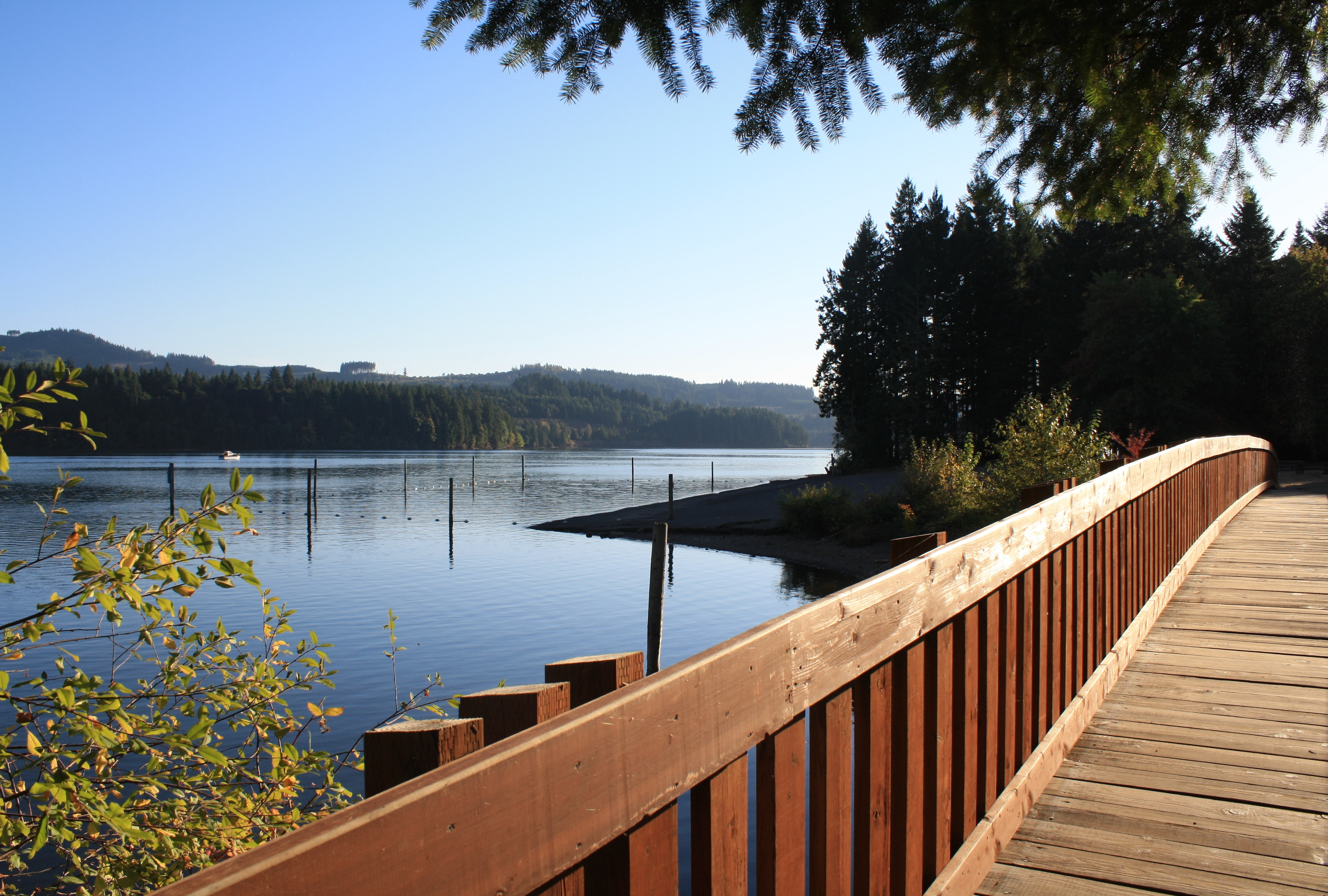
A pedestrian bridge crosses Lewis Creek at Lewis Creek Park along Foster Reservoir’s north shore.

Lewis Creek Park is a 40-acre (16 ha) recreation area located on the north shore of the reservoir. The park includes a roped-off swim beach, picnic areas, barbecues, paved trails, lake accessibility for shoreline fishing and boat moorage. The park is operated by the Linn County Parks Department.

Sunnyside Campground is a 98-acre (40 ha) park located on the eastern edge of Foster Reservoir. The park has 165 campsites including 132 campsites with electrical/water hook-ups, a dump station and restroom/shower facilities. A large day use area includes a playground, a sand volleyball court and lake shore access with picnic tables. There is also a large pond stocked with trout. The park, which is operated by the Linn County Parks Department, also offers a boat ramp and boat moorage.

Boat ramps are also located at Gedney Creek Park on the north side of the reservoir and at Calkins Park on the southeast edge of the reservoir.

=== Water sports ===
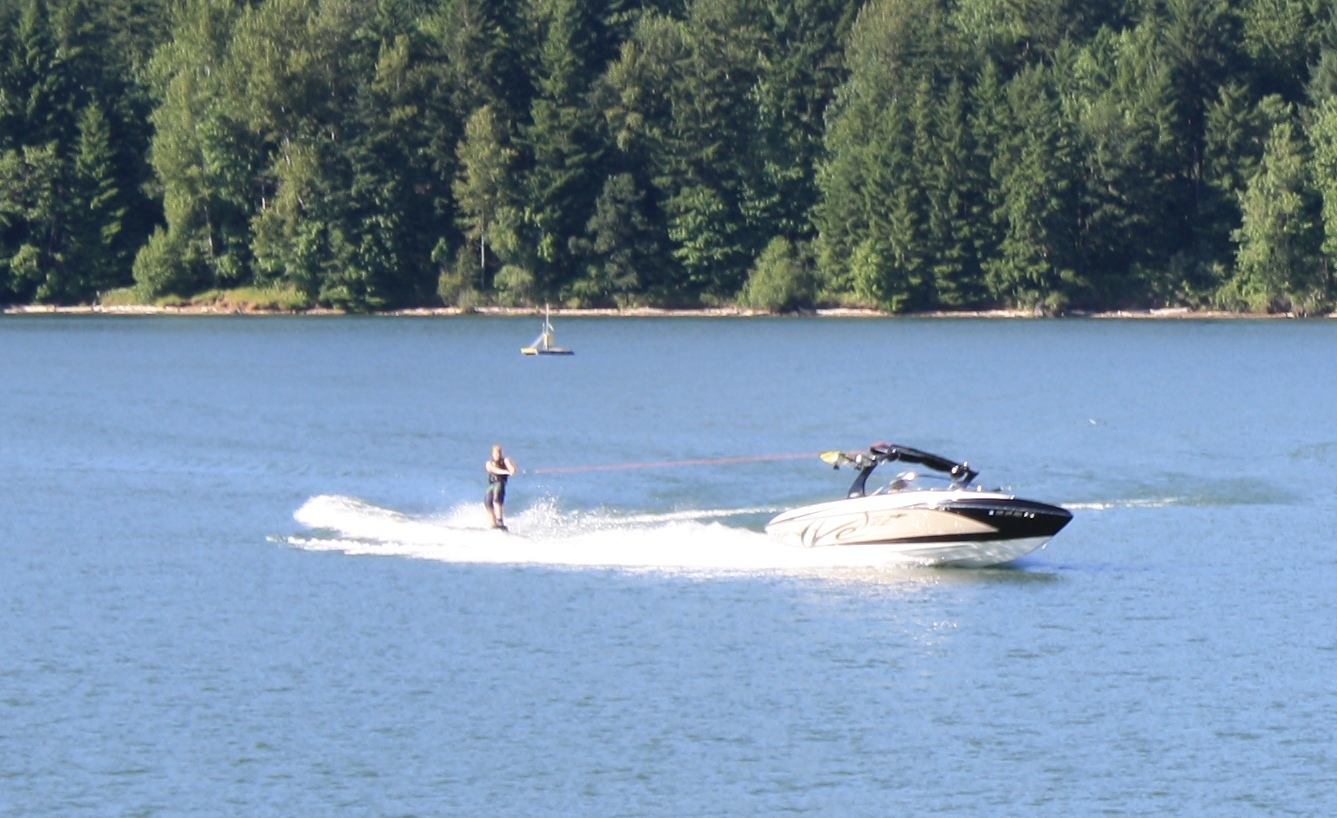
Water skiing near the northwest edge of Foster Reservoir

Foster Reservoir is a popular destination for a variety of water sports including boating, water skiing and jet skiing. The reservoir has also become a popular location for triathlons and water polo tournaments.

=== Fishing ===
Foster Reservoir is stocked with over 40,000 rainbow trout annually. The reservoir also has kokanee salmon and bass. There are numerous locations for shoreline fishing in addition to boat angling.

== Development ==
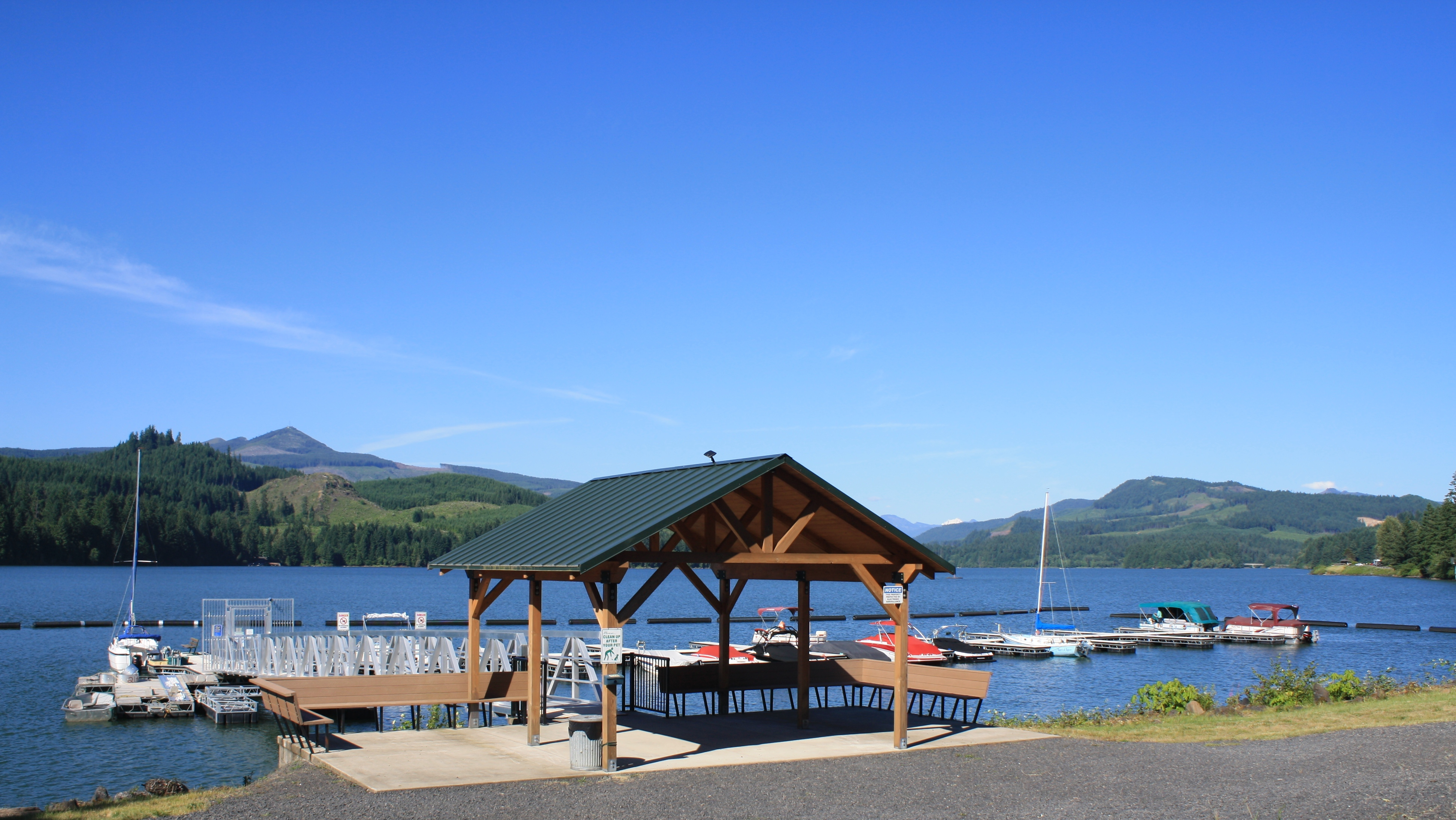
The Edgewater Marina is located on the southwest edge of Foster Reservoir.

Edgewater, a destination resort development, is located on the southwest edge of Foster Reservoir. Edgewater includes a 49-space RV park, lake-view townhomes and a marina. The marina offers slip rentals by the season, month and week, as well as a variety of recreational boat rentals.

Numerous other private and public campgrounds are located nearby.

== See also ==
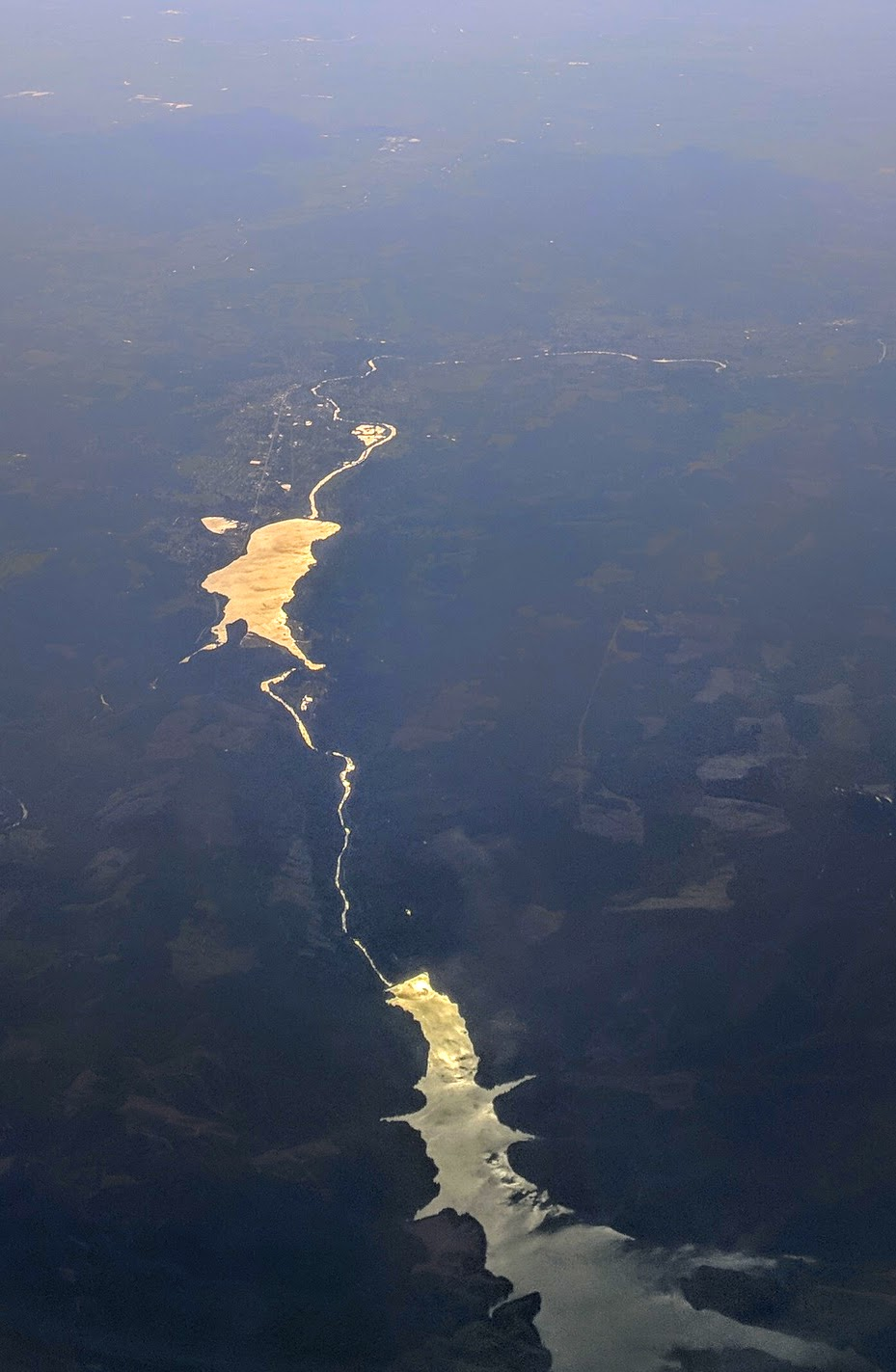
Aerial view of Foster and Green Peter lakes (reservoirs) reflecting the late-afternoon sun

- Green Peter Reservoir
- List of lakes in Oregon
