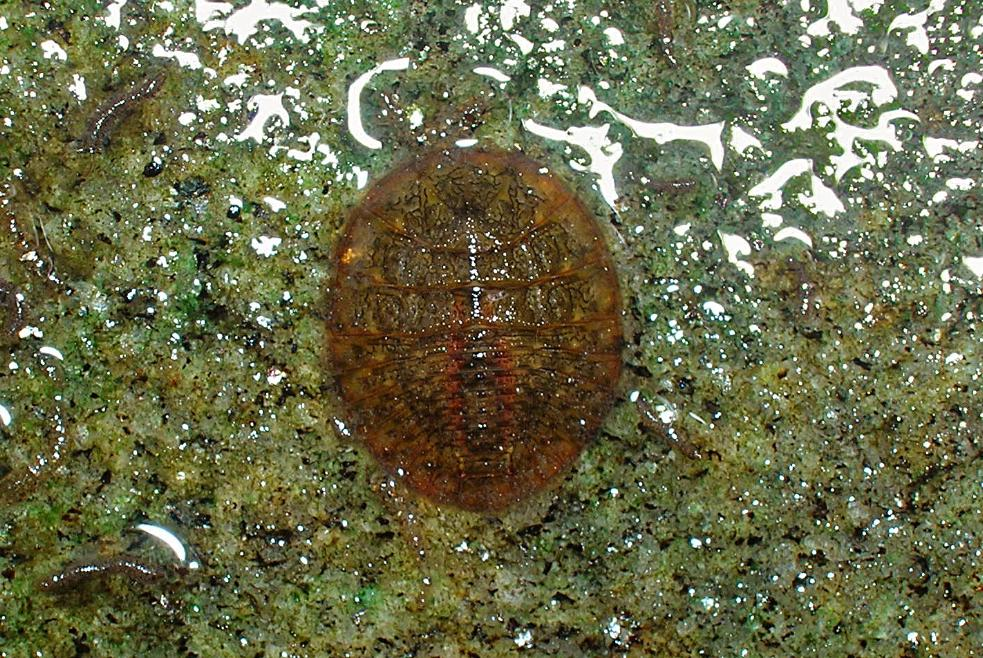
- Larva

Scientific classification
- Kingdom: Animalia
- Phylum: Arthropoda
- Clade: Pancrustacea
- Class: Insecta
- Order: Coleoptera
- Suborder: Polyphaga
- Infraorder: Elateriformia
- Superfamily: Byrrhoidea
- Family: Psephenidae; Lacordaire, 1854

Subfamilies
- Eubrianacinae Jacobson, 1913; Eubriinae Lacordaire, 1857; Psepheninae Lacordaire, 1854; Psephenoidinae Hinton, 1939

= Water-penny beetle =

Water-penny beetle Temporal range: Cenomanian–Recent

Family of beetles

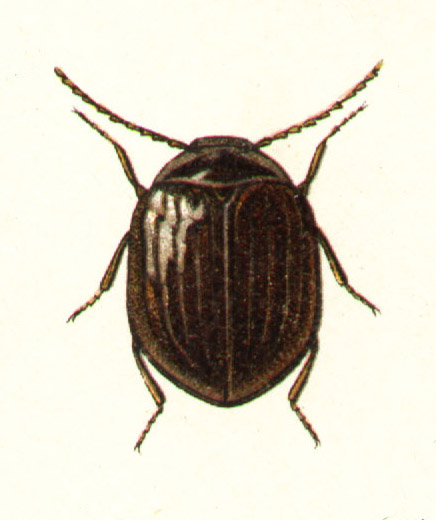
Eubria palustris adult

Water-penny beetles are a family (the Psephenidae) of 273 species (in 35 genera) of aquatic beetles found on all continents except Antarctica, in both tropical and temperate areas. The young, which live in water, resemble tiny pennies. The larvae feed – usually nocturnally – on algae on rock surfaces. The presence of water-penny larvae in a stream can be used as a test for the quality of the water, as they are pollution-sensitive. They cannot live in habitats where rocks acquire a thick layer of algae, fungi, or inorganic sediment. Therefore, their presence along with other diverse phyla signifies good-quality water. They are around 6 to 10 millimeters in length.

A water-penny larva's shell is oval-shaped to almost circular and is commonly a copper color, hence the name, 'water-penny'. Water-pennies obtain oxygen through their membrane and through feathery gills located at the base of the abdomen. They are typically found in riffles in streams with a moderate to fast current, clinging to the underside of logs or rocks. Occasionally, they can be found on rocks along the shores of lakes. Attached to the legs are scrapers, which are used to scrape the algae from the surface of a log or rock.

In North America, they are usually found in the Northeast, and occasionally discovered in the Southwest. Some genera in the US:

- Psephenus: the Northeast and the west coast (from Oregon to California; usually below 4,000 feet elevation in California).
- Eubrianax: California, up to 6,000 feet elevation.
- Ectopria: the northeastern and Central U.S.
- Acneus: California and Oregon up to 4,000 feet.

As adults, water-pennies become terrestrial. Adults are relatively short lived and eat little to nothing.

== Fossil genera ==
- Subfamily Eubrianacinae Jacobson 1913
  - †Succinumanax Bao et al. 2018 Burmese amber, Myanmar, Cenomanian
  - †Vetujinbrianax Cai and Huang 2018 Burmese amber, Myanmar, Cenomanian
- †Protacnaeus Wickham 1914 Florissant Formation, Colorado, Eocene
- †Psephenella Martins-Neto 1998 Tremembé Formation, Brazil, Oligocene
