= Cascade =

Cascade, or Cascading may refer to:

== Arts and entertainment ==
=== Music ===
==== Artists ====
- Cascade (band), a Japanese rock group, who formed in 1993
- Cascade, a former name of the German dance group Cascada
- Cascade, a British DJ duo also recording under the alias Transa

==== Albums ====
- Cascade, a 1984 album by Capercaillie
- Cascade, a 1986 album recorded by Terry Oldfield
- Cascade (Peter Murphy album), a 1995 album by Peter Murphy
- Cascade (Guy Manning album), a 2001 album by Guy Manning
- Cascade, a 2009 album by Abaddon Incarnate
- Cascade (William Basinski album), a 2015 album by William Basinski
- Cascade (Floating Points album), a 2024 album by Floating Points

==== Songs ====
- "Cascade", written by Gene Slone and played by Chet Atkins on his 1977 album Me and My Guitar
- "Cascade", by Spyro Gyra from the 1978 album Spyro Gyra
- "Cascade", by Siouxsie and the Banshees from the 1982 album A Kiss in the Dreamhouse
- "Cascade" (single), 1993, by The Future Sound of London
- "Cascade", by Dave Weckl from the 2005 album Multiplicity
- "The Cascade", by Moving Mountains from the 2011 album Waves
- "Cascade", by Kreidler from the 2012 album Den
- "Cascades", by Metric from the 2015 album Pagans in Vegas

=== Other uses in arts and entertainment ===
- The Cascade, a Canadian newspaper, first published in 1993 in British Columbia
- Cascade (film), a Canadian thriller film
- Cascade Films, an Australian film production company owned by Nadia Tass and David Parker

== Businesses and organizations ==
- Cascade Brewery, a brewery founded in 1832 in Australia
- Cascade College, a former college in Oregon, US
- Cascade Communications, a communications equipment manufacturer
- Cascade Investment, a financial company
- Open Cascade, a software development company with head office in France

== Places ==
=== Names used in multiple places ===
- Cascades (disambiguation)
- Cascade Creek (disambiguation)
- Cascade Falls (disambiguation)
- Cascade Lake (disambiguation)
- Cascade River (disambiguation)

=== Australia ===
- Cascade, Norfolk Island, a settlement in the Australian external territory of Norfolk Island
- Cascade, Western Australia

=== Canada ===
- Cascade City, British Columbia, a.k.a. Cascade Falls, a ghost town
- Cascade Falls (Kettle River), the eponymous waterfall near Cascade City
- Cascade Falls (Iskut River), waterfall in the Stikine-Iskut region of British Columbia
- Cascade Falls Regional Park, located on Cascade Creek northeast of the District of Mission in the Lower Mainland region of British Columbia
- Cascade Inlet, a side-inlet of Dean Channel in the Central Coast region of British Columbia

=== United States ===
- Cascade, California, an unincorporated community in Plumas County
- Cascade, Colorado
- Cascade, Idaho
- Lake Cascade, a reservoir in Idaho
- Cascade, Indiana, an unincorporated community
- Cascade, Iowa, a city in Dubuque County and Jones County
- Cascade Township, Michigan
- Cascade Township, Olmsted County, Minnesota
- Cascade, Missouri
- Cascade, Montana
- Cascade County, Montana
- Cascade, Nebraska
- Cascade, New Hampshire
- Cascade, Ohio, a former town in Putnam County
- Cascade Township, Lycoming County, Pennsylvania
- Cascade, Virginia, an unincorporated community
- Cascade, Seattle, Washington
- Cascade-Fairwood, Washington, a census-designated place in King County
- Cascade, West Virginia, an unincorporated community
- Cascade, Wisconsin, a village in Sheboygan County

=== Elsewhere ===
- Cascade, Jamaica, a settlement in Jamaica
- Cascade, Seychelles, an administrative district of Seychelles
- Penpedairheol, Caerphilly, also known as "Cascade", South Wales, UK
- Cascade Range, a mountain range on the west coast of North America

== Science, technology, and mathematics ==
=== Biology and ecology ===
- Cascade, the CRISPR-associated complex for antiviral defense (a protein complex)
- Cascade (grape), a type of fruit
- Biochemical cascade, a series of biochemical reactions, in which a product of the previous step is the substrate of the next
- Ecological cascade, a series of secondary extinctions triggered by the primary extinction of a key species in an ecosystem
- Trophic cascade, an interaction that can occur throughout an ecosystem when a trophic level is suppressed

=== Computing ===
- Cascade (computer virus), a type of computer virus in the 1980s
- Cascading (software), an abstraction layer for Hadoop
- Cascading classifiers, a multistage classification scheme
- Cascading deletion, a way to handle deletions in database systems
- Cascading Style Sheets (CSS), style sheet language used in markup languages like HTML
- Method cascading, in object-oriented languages

=== Electronics ===
- Cascade amplifier, any two-port network constructed from a series of amplifiers
- Cascade connection, a type of electrical network connection
  - Cascade motor connection, a speed control system for induction motor

=== Physics ===
- Air shower (physics), a cascade (particle shower) of subatomic particles and ionized nuclei
  - Particle shower, a cascade of secondary particles produced as the result of a high-energy particle interacting with dense matter
- Collision cascade, a set of nearby adjacent energetic collisions of atoms induced by an energetic particle in a solid or liquid
- Energy cascade, a process important in turbulent flow and drag by which kinetic energy is converted into heat

=== Other uses in science, technology, and mathematics ===
- Cascade (chemical engineering), a series of chemical processes
- Cascade failure, a mode of failure in which the loss of one interlinked network node causes the overload of others
- Cascade filling system, for gases
- Cascade waterfalls, or series of waterfalls
- Period-doubling cascade, an infinite sequence of period-doubling in dynamic systems

== Transportation ==
- Cascade (sternwheeler 1864), a steamboat that operated in Oregon
- Cascade (train), a railroad train
- USS Cascade (AD-16), a 1942 ship

== Other uses ==
- Cascade (brand), brand name of dishwashing detergent manufactured by Procter & Gamble
- Cascade (juggling), a juggling pattern
- Cascade hop, an agricultural crop
- Information cascade, when people use the actions of others as an input to their own actions
- Jabot (window), also called a cascade, a type of interior decor
- Yerevan Cascade, known as The Cascade, a building in Yerevan, Armenia
- Cascade, an artificial waterfall designed to embellish a large garden or country estate

== See also ==
- Cascada (disambiguation)
- Cascades (disambiguation)
- Cascadia (disambiguation)
- Cascode, a type of amplifier in electronics
- Collisional cascading (disambiguation)
- KASCADE, a European physics experiment
- Kaskade (Ryan Gary Raddon, born 1971), American DJ
