= Le Conte Mountain =

Mountain in Washington (state), United States

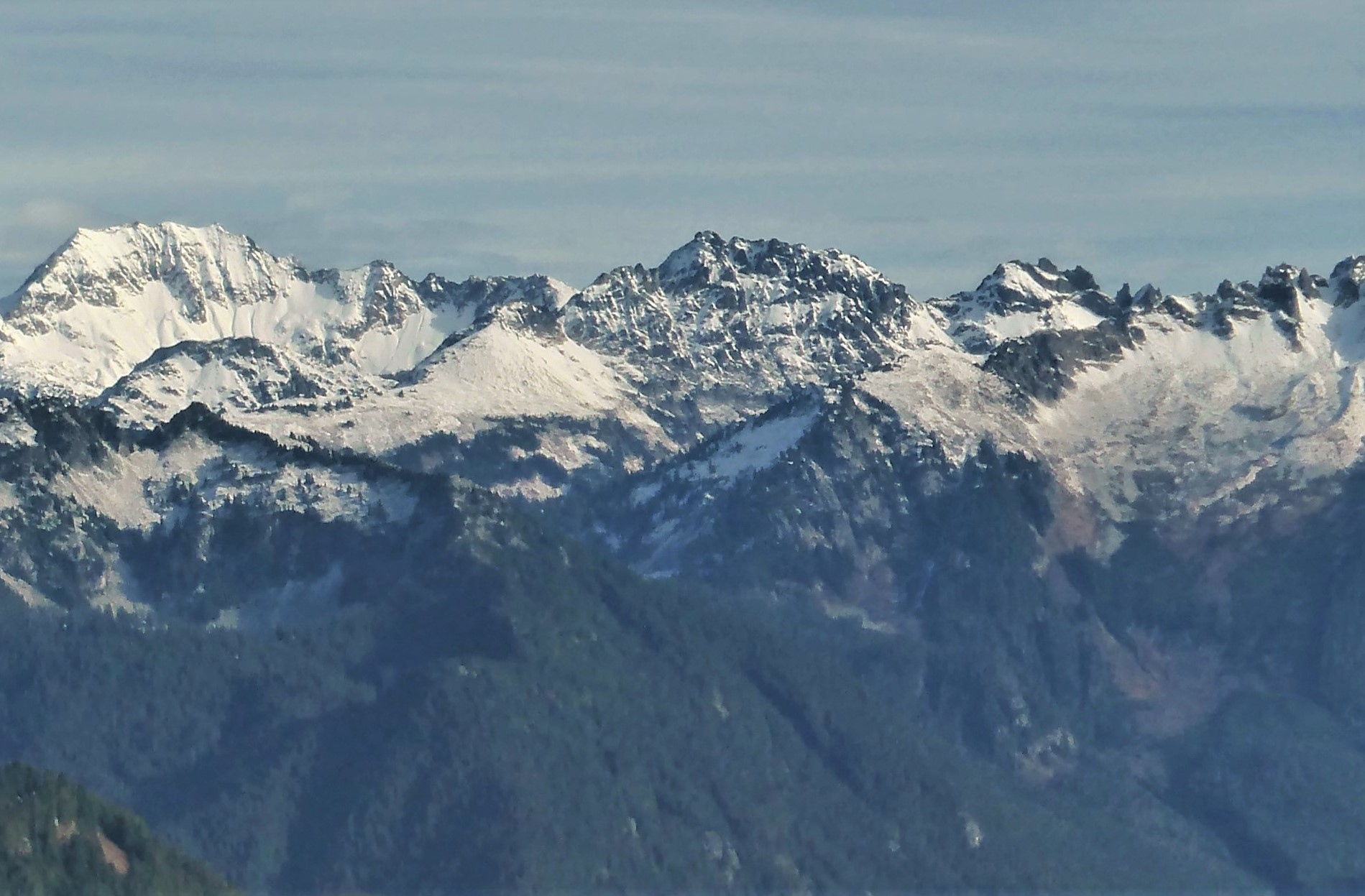
- Le Conte Mountain (centered) from the southwest. (Spider Mountain to left)

Highest point
- Elevation: 7,762 ft (2,366 m)
- Prominence: 842 ft (257 m)
- Parent peak: Sentinel Peak (8,266 ft)
- Isolation: 1.87 mi (3.01 km)
- Coordinates: 48°22′46″N 121°03′42″W

Naming
- Etymology: Joseph LeConte

Geography
- Location within Washington (state) Location within the United States
- Interactive map of Le Conte Mountain
- Country: United States
- State: Washington
- County: Chelan / Skagit
- Protected area: Glacier Peak Wilderness
- Parent range: North Cascades
- Topo map: USGS Cascade Pass

Climbing
- First ascent: 1938
- Easiest route: class 4 scrambling via Ptarmigan Traverse

Le Conte Mountain is a 7,762-foot-elevation (2,366-meter) summit located on the shared boundary of Skagit County and Chelan County in Washington state. It is positioned on the crest of the North Cascades Range, and is set within the Glacier Peak Wilderness. Le Conte Mountain is situated on the shared border of Mount Baker-Snoqualmie National Forest and Okanogan-Wenatchee National Forest. Access to the peak is via the Ptarmigan Traverse. The nearest higher neighbor is Sentinel Peak, 1.87 miles (3.01 km) to the south-southeast, and Spider Mountain is 2.4 miles (3.9 km) to the northeast. The Le Conte Glacier and South Cascade Glacier lie to the south of the peak. Precipitation runoff on the east side the mountain drains into Flat Creek which is a tributary of the Stehekin River, while precipitation drains into headwaters of the South Fork Cascade River from the west side. Topographic relief is significant as the southwest aspect rises nearly 2,500 feet (760 meters) above South Cascade Lake in less than one-half mile, and the northeast aspect rises 3,200 feet above Flat Creek in one mile.

== History ==
This geographical feature's toponym was officially adopted by the U.S. Board on Geographic Names to honor geologist Joseph LeConte (1823–1901). The first ascent of the summit was made by Calder T. Bressler, Ralph W. Clough, Bill Cox and Tom Myers on July 23, 1938. The Southeast Ridge was first climbed in 1953 by Dale Cole, Robert Grant, Michael Hane, Erick Karlsson and Tom Miller, while the Northwest Ridge was first climbed in 1957 by Art Maki and Joe Quigley.

== Climate ==
Le Conte Mountain is located in the marine west coast climate zone of western North America. Most weather fronts coming off the Pacific Ocean travel northeast toward the Cascade Mountains. As fronts approach the North Cascades, they are forced upward by the peaks of the Cascade Range (orographic lift), causing them to drop their moisture in the form of rain or snowfall onto the Cascades. As a result, the west side of the North Cascades experiences high precipitation, especially during the winter months in the form of snowfall. Because of maritime influence, snow tends to be wet and heavy, resulting in avalanche danger. During winter months, weather is usually cloudy, but due to high pressure systems over the Pacific Ocean that intensify during summer months, there is often little or no cloud cover during the summer.

== Geology ==
The North Cascades features some of the most rugged topography in the Cascade Range with craggy peaks and ridges, deep glacial valleys, and granite spires. Geological events occurring many years ago created the diverse topography and drastic elevation changes over the Cascade Range leading to the various climate differences. These climate differences lead to vegetation variety defining the ecoregions in this area.

The history of the formation of the Cascade Mountains dates back millions of years ago to the late Eocene Epoch. With the North American Plate overriding the Pacific Plate, episodes of volcanic igneous activity persisted. In addition, small fragments of the oceanic and continental lithosphere called terranes created the North Cascades about 50 million years ago.

During the Pleistocene period dating back over two million years ago, glaciation advancing and retreating repeatedly scoured the landscape leaving deposits of rock debris. The U-shaped cross section of the river valleys is a result of recent glaciation. Uplift and faulting in combination with glaciation have been the dominant processes which have created the tall peaks and deep valleys of the North Cascades area.

== Gallery ==
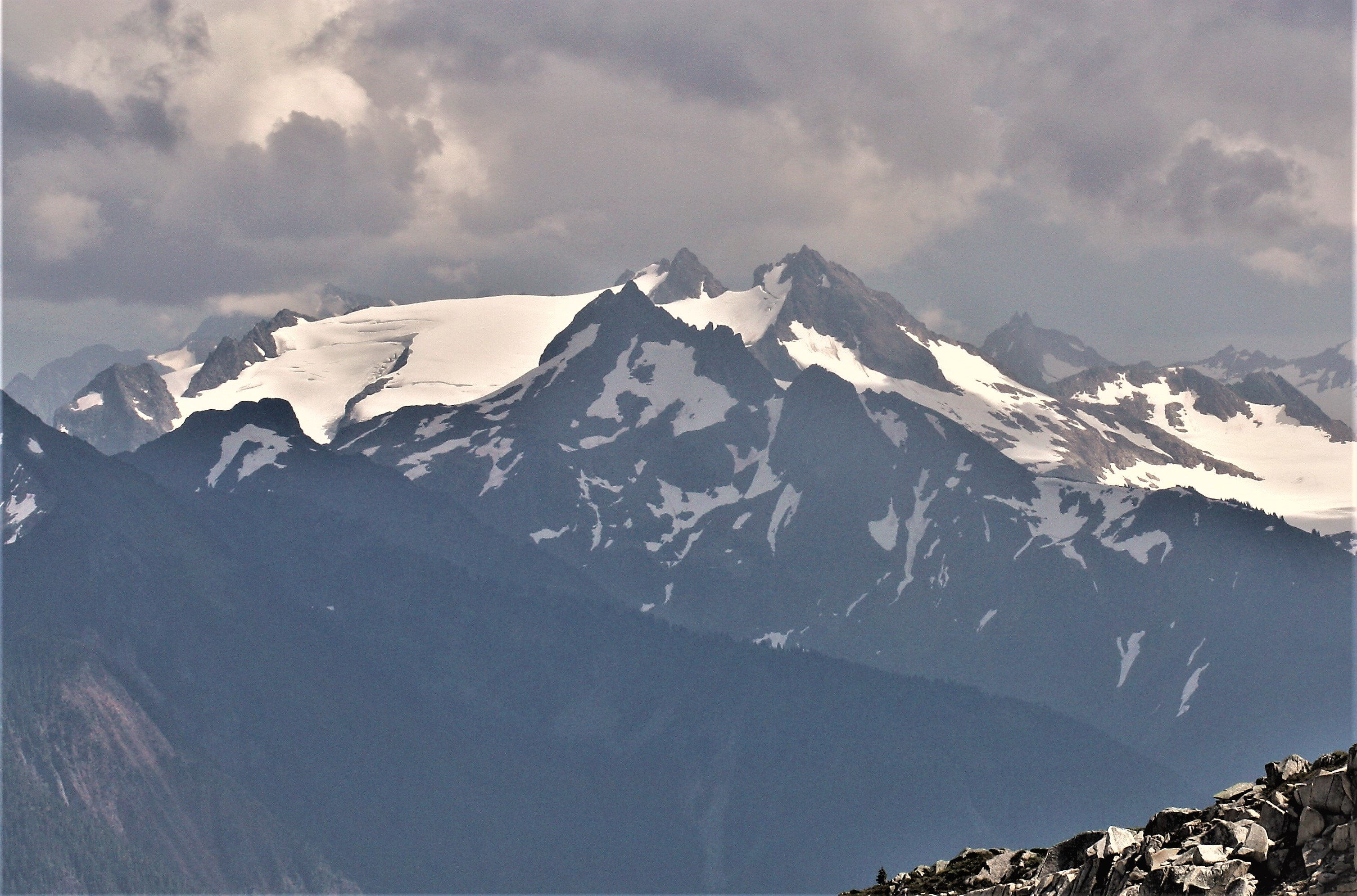
Le Conte Mountain (centered, shaded), with Le Conte Glacier-Old Guard-Sentinel Peak behind. View from Hidden Lake Peaks.

== See also ==
- Geography of the North Cascades
