= Skykomish Valley =

Geographical region in the U.S.

Coordinates: 47°51′0″N 121°59′19.2″W

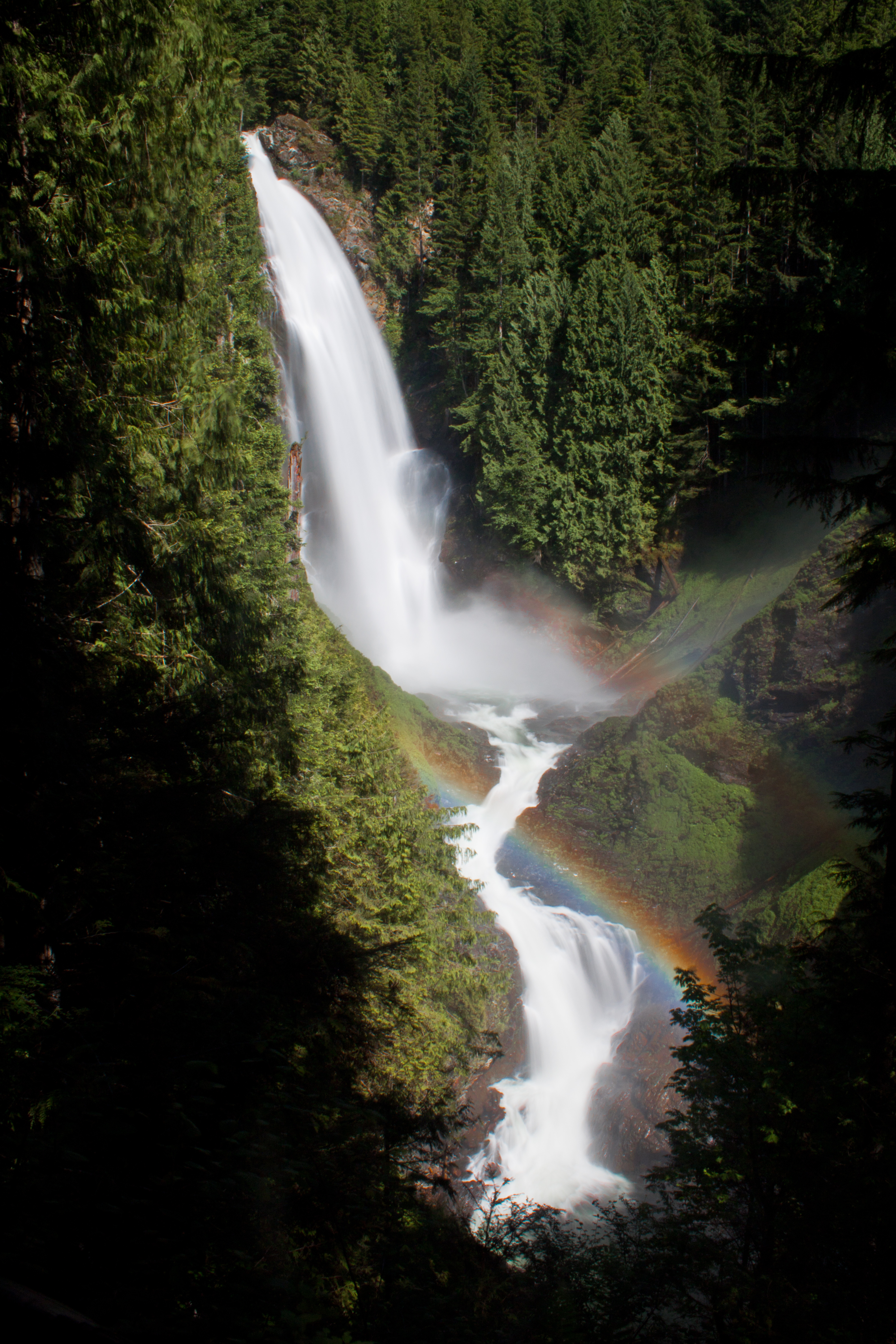
Wallace middle falls

The Skykomish Valley, nicknamed Sky Valley, is a region of Snohomish County, Washington, United States, that lies along the Skykomish River. It stretches from Snohomish to the Cascade Mountains, terminating near Skykomish, Washington. The towns from east to west include Skykomish, Baring, Grotto, Index, Gold Bar, Startup, Sultan and Monroe.

The valley communities were founded in the mid-19th century by homesteaders whose livelihoods included logging, mining, farming, and in the late 1890s, the Great Northern Railway.
