= Skykomish, Washington =

Skykomish
- Town

- Location of Skykomish, Washington
- Coordinates: 47°42′37″N 121°21′30″W
- Country: United States
- State: Washington
- County: King
- Founded: 1889
- Incorporated: June 5, 1909

Government
  - Type: Mayor–council
  - Mayor: Henry Sladek

Area
  - Total: 0.34 sq mi (0.88 km^{2})
  - Land: 0.31 sq mi (0.81 km^{2})
  - Water: 0.027 sq mi (0.07 km^{2})
- Elevation: 925 ft (282 m)

Population (2020)
  - Total: 161
  - Estimate (2022): 158
  - Density: 700.4/sq mi (270.42/km^{2})
- Time zone: UTC−8 (Pacific (PST))
  - Summer (DST): UTC−7 (PDT)
- ZIP Code: 98288
- Area code(s): 360, 564
- FIPS code: 53-64855
- GNIS feature ID: 2413295
- Website: skykomishwa.gov

Skykomish is a town in King County, Washington, United States. The population was 161 as of the 2020 census, down from an estimated peak of "several thousand" in the 1920s. The town lies on the South Fork Skykomish River approximately 49 miles (79 km) east of Everett on U.S. Route 2. It is surrounded by the Mount Baker–Snoqualmie National Forest and is in the foothills of the Cascade Mountains.

The town was founded as a maintenance and fueling station during construction of the Great Northern Railway, which follows the Skykomish Valley and crosses the Cascades near Stevens Pass. Skykomish lacks direct road access to the rest of King County due to its mountainous surroundings; U.S. Route 2 is the only road link and travels through Snohomish County to the north. The town is a stopping point for recreational access in the Cascades, including the nearby Stevens Pass Ski Area.

== History ==
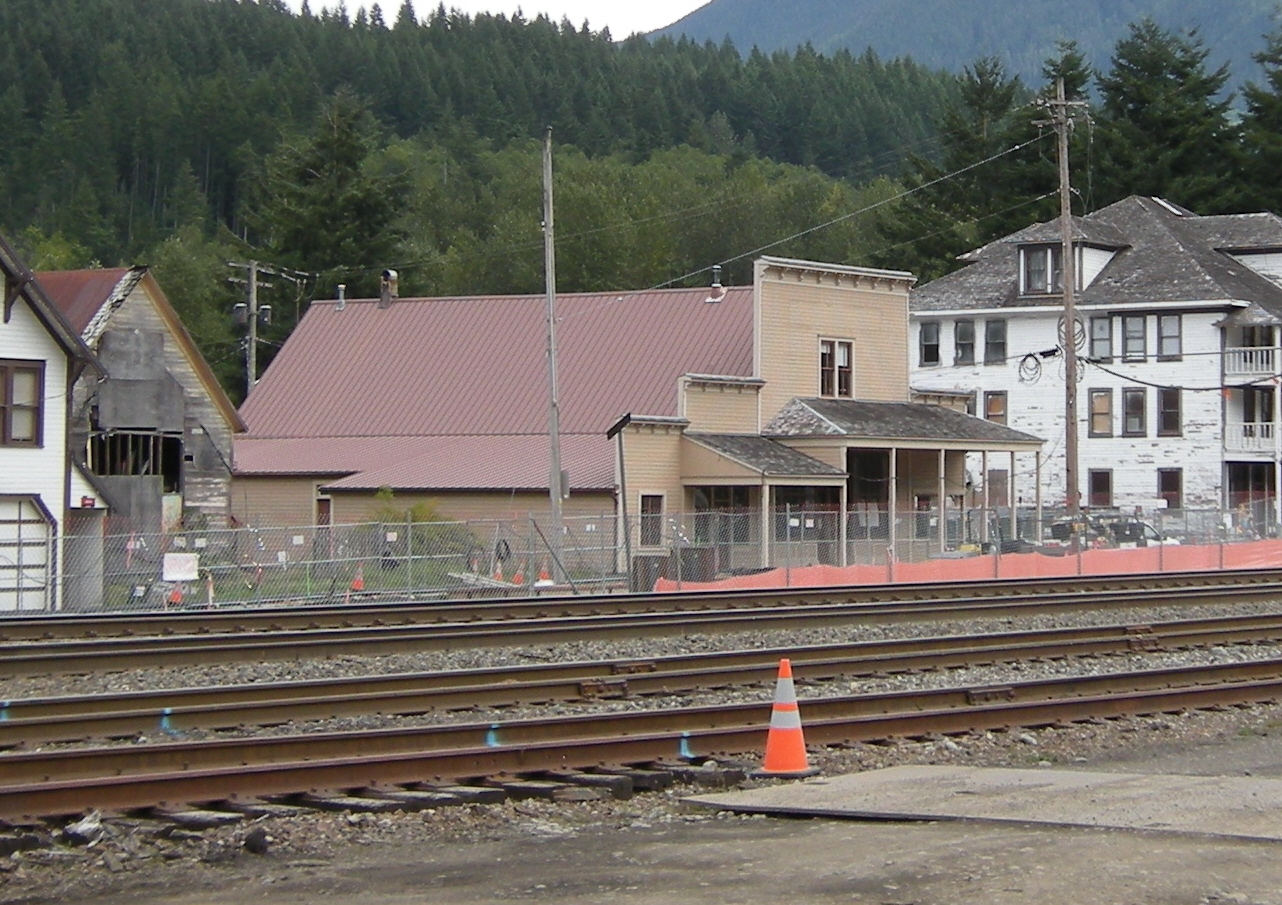
Maloney's General Store in 2008

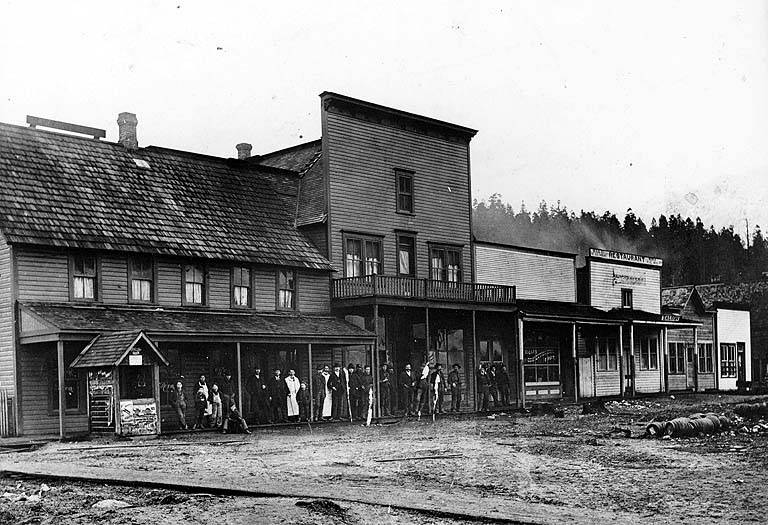
Schneider's Hotel, circa 1903

The name "Skykomish" derives from the Skykomish or Skai-whamish tribe (originally considered a subdivision of the Snoqualmies) who inhabited the area before European settlement.

John Maloney, a guide for the surveying team on the Great Northern Railway, settled a flat spot in 1892, which got the name "Maloney's Siding". The following year the railroad was completed, and when a post office was established, the place became known as Skykomish. The townsite was platted in 1889 and was officially incorporated as the town of Skykomish on June 5, 1909. Maloney opened Maloney's General Store in 1893. A hotel, the Skykomish Hotel, soon followed. In 1902 this hotel burned to the ground and was replaced by Schneider's Hotel. In 1904, a fire burned down every commercial building except the store. Maloney's General Store was placed on the National Register of Historic Places on August 29, 1997. In 2000, the entire commercial district, with the historic Skykomish Hotel (erected to replace the burned-down Schneider's Hotel in 1904) as its cornerstone, was also placed on the NRHP.

From the 1890s to 1974, Skykomish was a maintenance and fueling station for the Great Northern Railway, which eventually became part of the Burlington Northern Railroad, and presently the BNSF Railway. At its peak, eight passenger trains serviced Skykomish daily, and it saw stops by several named passenger trains including the Great Northern Flyer, the Oriental Limited, the Cascadian, the Western Star and the Empire Builder. It was also once the western terminus for electric operations (1928–56) on the Cascade Tunnel route all the way to Wenatchee. Here, steam or diesel locomotives were changed or coupled to electric locomotives. The Great Northern Depot, the former Skykomish station, was moved to a new city park in 2012 and today serves as a visitors center and history museum.

The town gained a public library service operated by the King County Rural Library District in 1944, its library opening the following year in the city hall. It moved to a new building in 1993, which was expanded in 2006. As of 2026 the Skykomish branch is open three days a week.

Skykomish's population peaked at around 8,000 in the 1920s and shrank to under 300 by 1990 due to the loss of businesses and jobs.

Legal but ill-advised waste disposal practices, common during that era, resulted in the contamination of its soil, its groundwater, and the Skykomish River by oil and heavy metals. The video class of the local school chose to document the oil under the town as the "An Oily Sky" video, winning the 2001 Brower Youth Awards and the 2002 President’s Environmental Youth Award. While BNSF (then BN) and the Washington State Department of Ecology had begun remediation discussions in the mid-1980s; in 2006, they agreed to a plan whereby the railroad would pay up to $50 million to clean up the area over a three-year period (completed in 2009). This effort involved massive excavations—essentially removing the contaminated soil and replacing it with clean soil—and the rebuilding of a levee. (The eventual total cost of the cleanup exceeded $100 million.)

Twenty two of Skykomish's buildings – both homes and business – were temporarily moved during the cleanup process. After the contaminated soil under them was removed, the buildings were moved back to their original locations on new foundations and utilities connections. The town was restored with modern conveniences such as sidewalks and street lights, but the historic character of Skykomish was maintained. The greatest benefit of the cleanup to every resident and business in town was the installation of the new wastewater treatment system connected to every building.

== Geography ==
The relative isolation of Skykomish from the rest of the county and its services has led to calls for secession or joining Snohomish County. Skykomish has no direct road connection to the rest of King County.

According to the United States Census Bureau, the town has a total area of 0.33 square miles (0.85 km^{2}), of which, 0.31 square miles (0.80 km^{2}) is land and 0.02 square miles (0.05 km^{2}) is water.

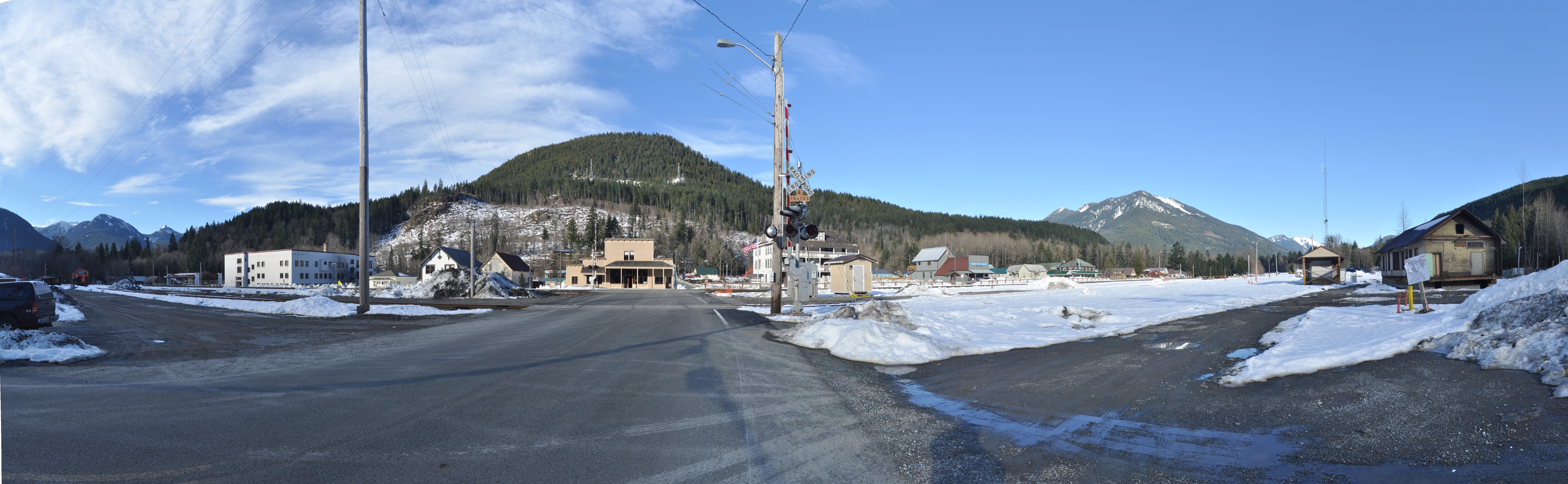
Panoramic view of downtown Skykomish, 2012. The former Maloneys General Store is straight ahead. Great Northern Depot is at extreme right. Each is on the National Register of Historic Places in its own right, as is the entire historic center of the town.

== Climate ==
Skykomish has a Cfb (bordering on Dsb, Dfb, and Csb) climate, with warm, sunny summers and cold, snowy winters.

Climate data for Skykomish, Washington (1955)
Month	Jan	Feb	Mar	Apr	May	Jun	Jul	Aug	Sep	Oct	Nov	Dec	Year
Mean daily maximum °F (°C)	39.7 (4.3)	42.4 (5.8)	49.9 (9.9)	58.2 (14.6)	64.9 (18.3)	69.8 (21.0)	76.1 (24.5)	75.2 (24.0)	70.5 (21.4)	59.0 (15.0)	46.8 (8.2)	40.9 (4.9)	57.8 (14.3)
Mean daily minimum °F (°C)	29.2 (−1.6)	29.5 (−1.4)	31.4 (−0.3)	38.0 (3.3)	43.5 (6.4)	49.0 (9.4)	49.0 (9.4)	49.7 (9.8)	47.0 (8.3)	40.8 (4.9)	33.7 (0.9)	30.3 (−0.9)	38.9 (3.8)
Average precipitation inches (mm)	15.00 (381)	10.36 (263)	9.35 (237)	7.57 (192)	5.25 (133)	3.77 (96)	1.62 (41)	2.14 (54)	3.86 (98)	9.19 (233)	16.07 (408)	15.35 (390)	99.53 (2,526)
Average snowfall inches (cm)	17.2 (44)	10.7 (27)	6.8 (17)	0.2 (0.51)	0 (0)	0 (0)	0 (0)	0 (0)	0 (0)	0 (0)	0 (0)	16.6 (42)	51.5 (130.51)
Average precipitation days (≥ 0.01 in)	20	17	19	18	14	13	7	6	11	16	21	19	181
Source: Western Regional Climate Center

== Demographics ==
Historical population
Census	Pop.	Note	%±
1910	238		—
1920	267		12.2%
1930	562		110.5%
1940	479		−14.8%
1950	497		3.8%
1960	366		−26.4%
1970	283		−22.7%
1980	209		−26.1%
1990	273		30.6%
2000	214		−21.6%
2010	198		−7.5%
2020	161		−18.7%
2022 (est.)	158	▼	−1.9%
U.S. Decennial Census

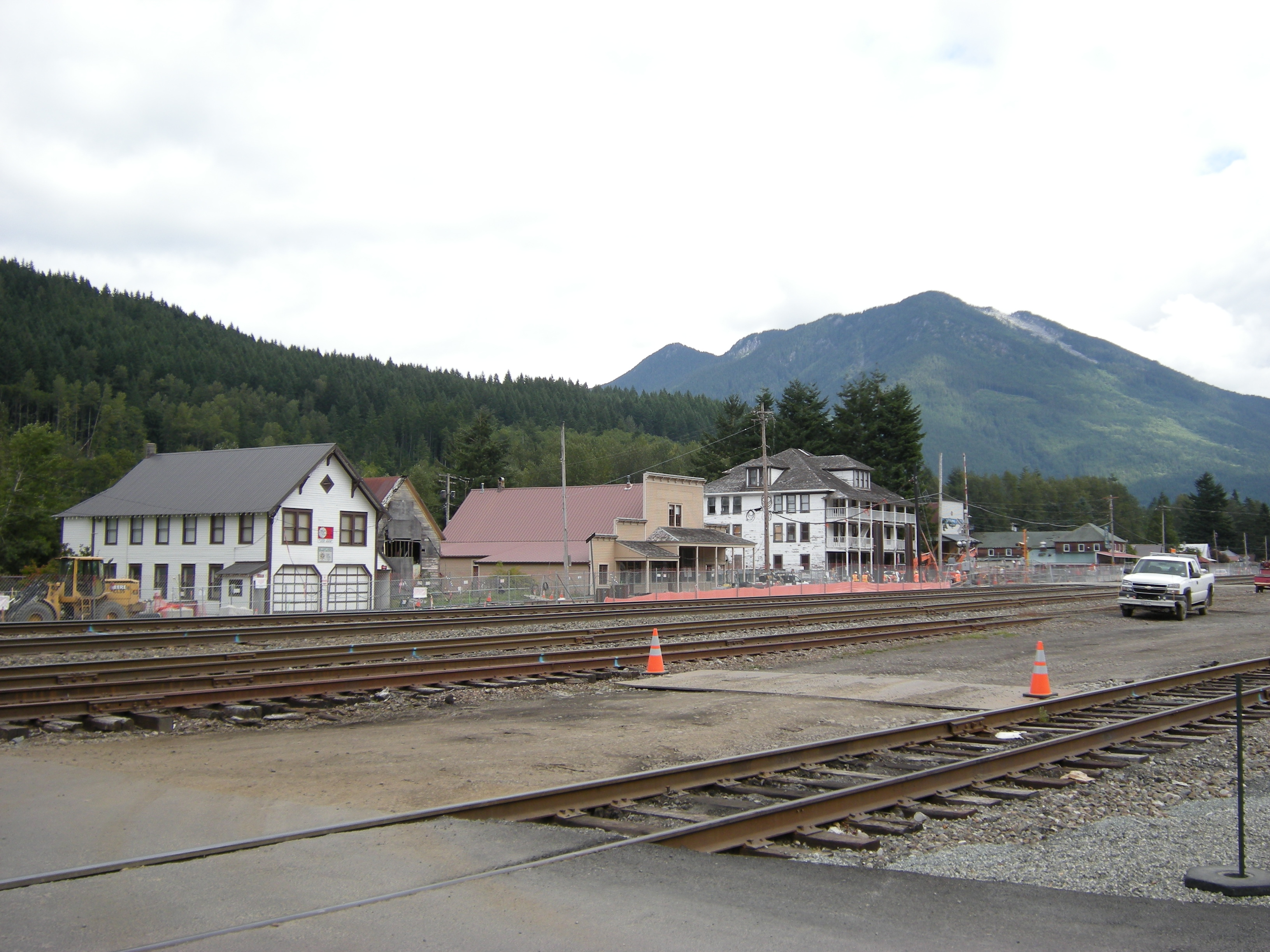
The heart of Skykomish (2008). In foreground, the BNSF tracks. Behind that, left to right: Skykomish Historical Society Museum, Maloney's General Store, listed on the National Register of Historic Places, Skykomish Hotel, Cascadian Hotel and Café.

=== 2020 census ===
As of the 2020 census, there were 161 people, 49 households in the town.

=== 2010 census ===
As of the 2010 census, there were 198 people, 95 households, and 45 families living in the town. The population density was 638.7 inhabitants per square mile (246.6/km^{2}). There were 168 housing units at an average density of 541.9 per square mile (209.2/km^{2}). The racial makeup of the town was 95.5% White, 1.0% African American, 1.5% Native American, 1.5% Asian, and 0.5% from two or more races. Hispanic or Latino of any race were 1.5% of the population.

There were 95 households, of which 20.0% had children under the age of 18 living with them, 34.7% were married couples living together, 4.2% had a female householder with no husband present, 8.4% had a male householder with no wife present, and 52.6% were non-families. 44.2% of all households were made up of individuals, and 14.7% had someone living alone who was 65 years of age or older. The average household size was 2.08 and the average family size was 2.87.

The median age in the town was 51.3 years. 18.2% of residents were under the age of 18; 6.1% were between the ages of 18 and 24; 18.7% were from 25 to 44; 38.4% were from 45 to 64; and 18.7% were 65 years of age or older. The gender makeup of the town was 57.1% male and 42.9% female.

=== 2000 census ===
As of the 2000 census, there were 214 people, 104 households, and 58 families living in the town. The population density was 623.2 people per square mile (243.0/km^{2}). There were 162 housing units at an average density of 471.8 per square mile (184.0/km^{2}). The racial makeup of the town was 94.39% White, 0.47% African American, 1.40% Native American, 0.93% Asian, and 2.80% from two or more races. Hispanics or Latinos of any race were 2.80% of the population.

There were 104 households, of which 20.2% had children under the age of 18 living with them. 48.1% were married couples living together, 2.9% had a female householder with no husband present, and 44.2% were non-families. 34.6% of all households were made up of individuals, and 17.3% had someone living alone who was 65 years of age or older. The average household size was 2.06 and the average family size was 2.66.

18.2% of the town's population was under the age of 18, 5.1% from 18 to 24, 23.8% from 25 to 44, 34.1% from 45 to 64, and 18.7% 65 or older. The median age was 46 years. For every 100 females, there were 96.3 males. For every 100 females age 18 and over, there were 103.5 males.

The median income for a household in the town was $45,357, and the median income for a family was $48,500. Males had a median income of $42,500 versus $25,938 for females. The per capita income for the town was $22,829. About 3.0% of families and 9.0% of the population were below the poverty line, including 8.6% of those under the age of 18 and none of those 65 or over.

== Infrastructure ==
Skykomish is served by a single road: U.S. Route 2, with access to the rest of King County only through either Snohomish County to the north or through Chelan County to the east. The town lacks bus service, but provides a free vanpool once a week to Monroe via Grotto, Baring, Index, Gold Bar, Startup, and Sultan. In 1973, Metro Transit introduced a weekly bus between Downtown Seattle and Skykomish with intermediate stops in Snohomish County. The route was contracted out to Community Transit, the transit provider for Snohomish County, and service was increased to three times a week. Community Transit later truncated the route to Gold Bar, leaving Skykomish without normal bus service.

The town's residents mainly relied on dial-up service for internet access until the full rollout of DSL in the 2010s—far later than the rest of King County. A $1.3 million project to add fiber-optic service to Skykomish was announced in 2021 by Ziply Fiber with funding from the state government. At this time, an existing fiber-optic cable ran underground through parts of the town without serving its residents. Access to fiber optic connections with up to 5 Gbps speeds were enabled in May 2022, though only satellite internet offers full availability.
