= Cascade Falls =

Cascade Falls may refer to:

== Canada ==
- Cascade Falls (Iskut River), a waterfall in British Columbia
- Cascade Falls (Kettle River), a waterfall in British Columbia
- Cascade Falls Regional Park, British Columbia

== United States ==
Alphabetical by state

- Cascade Falls (Georgia), or Caledonia Cascade, a waterfall in Rabun County, Georgia
- Cascade Falls (Ellicott City), a waterfall in Patapsco Valley State Park, Maryland
- Cascade Falls (Jackson, Michigan), an artificial waterfall attraction in Cascade Falls Park
- Cascade Falls, a waterfall of Montana
- Cascade Falls (Falls Creek), a waterfall near Boone, North Carolina
- Cascades Waterfall (Craggy Mountains), Buncombe County, North Carolina
- Cascade Falls (Lincoln County, Oregon), a waterfall
- Cascade Falls (Linn County, Oregon), a waterfall
- Cascades Rapids, or Cascade Falls, a defunct rapids along the Columbia River in Oregon and Washington
- Cascade Falls, a waterfall in the Cascades conservation area, Giles County, Virginia
- Cascade Falls (Falls Creek), a waterfall in Wilkes County, Virginia
- Cascade Falls (Osceola), a waterfall in Wisconsin

== Fictional ==
- Cascade Falls, Washington, a fictional town in the video game World in Conflict

== See also ==
- Cascade Creek (disambiguation)
- Cascade River (disambiguation)
- Cascade (disambiguation)
- Cascades (disambiguation)
- Cascadero Falls
