= Cascade Creek =

Cascade Creek may refer to:

- Cascade Creek (Grand Teton National Park), Wyoming
- Cascade Creek (San Anselmo Creek), California
- Cascade Creek (South Dakota)
- Cascade Creek, in British Columbia's Cascade Falls Regional Park
- Cascade Creek, a tributary to Fountain Creek in Colorado
- Cascade Creek, a tributary of the Eglinton River in Southland, New Zealand

== See also ==
- Cascade River (disambiguation)
- Cascade Falls (disambiguation)
- Cascade Lake (disambiguation)
