= Cascada (disambiguation) =

Cascada is a musical group.

Cascada may also refer to:

- Opel Cascada, a car model
- Big Creek, California, previously called Cascada
- Cascada (hotel), in Portland, Oregon, United States
- Las Cascadas Water Park, in Aguadilla, Puerto Rico
- Las Cascadas, Chile, a town in southern Chile near Llanquihue Lake

== See also ==
- Cascade (disambiguation)
- Cascadia (disambiguation)
- Kaskade (born 1971), American DJ and record producer
- KASCADE, a European physics experiment (1996)
