= Cascadia =

Cascadia and Cascadian may refer to:

== Places ==
=== Regions ===
- Cascadia (region) (or Pacific Northwest), the northwest of North America
  - Cascadia (bioregion), in ecology
- Anglican Diocese of Cascadia, United States

=== Settlements in the United States ===
- Cascadia, Oregon
- Tehaleh, Washington, formerly known as Cascadia

=== Landforms ===
- Cascadia Channel, under the Pacific Ocean
- Cascadia subduction zone, a convergent plate boundary

=== Other places ===
- Cascadia State Park, Oregon, US
- Cascadia College, Bothell, Washington, US

== Arts and entertainment ==
- Cascadia (album), 2022, by Dmitri Matheny
- Cascadia (board game), 2021
- METAtropolis: Cascadia, a 2010 sci-fi audiobook
- Cascadia, a 2019 album by Said the Whale
- Cascadia, a fictional country in the 2020 video game Project Wingman
- Cascadia, a fictional country in the 2016 video game Mirror's Edge Catalyst

== Vehicles ==
- Cascadian (train), a Seattle–Spokane service, 1929–1959
- Freightliner Cascadia, a 2007 semi-trailer truck

== Other uses ==
- Cascadian (horse), a racehorse, foaled 2015
- Cascadia (plant), an annual flower genus
- Microsoft Windows Terminal (released 2019; codename: Cascadia)
  - Cascadia Code, its monospaced font

== See also ==
- Acadia
- Cascada (disambiguation)
- Cascade (disambiguation)
- Cascadia movement, a regional movement
- 1700 Cascadia earthquake, a magnitude 8.7 to 9.2 megathrust earthquake that occurred in the Cascadia subduction zone on January 26, 1700
