= Cascade Lake (disambiguation) =

Cascade Lake is an Intel processor microarchitecture.

Cascade Lake may also refer to:

== Lakes in the United States ==
- Cascade Lake (California)
- Lake Cascade, formerly Cascade Reservoir, Idaho
- Cascade Lake (Montana), in the List of lakes in Sweet Grass County, Montana
- Cascade Lake (New York)
- Cascade Lakes, a collection of lakes in Oregon
- South Cascade Lake, Washington

== See also ==
- Lake Cascade State Park, Idaho, US
- Cascade Pond, New York, US
- South Cascade Glacier, Washington, US
