= Skykomish station =

Historic railway station in Skykomish, Washington, U.S.

- Great Northern Depot
- U.S. National Register of Historic Places
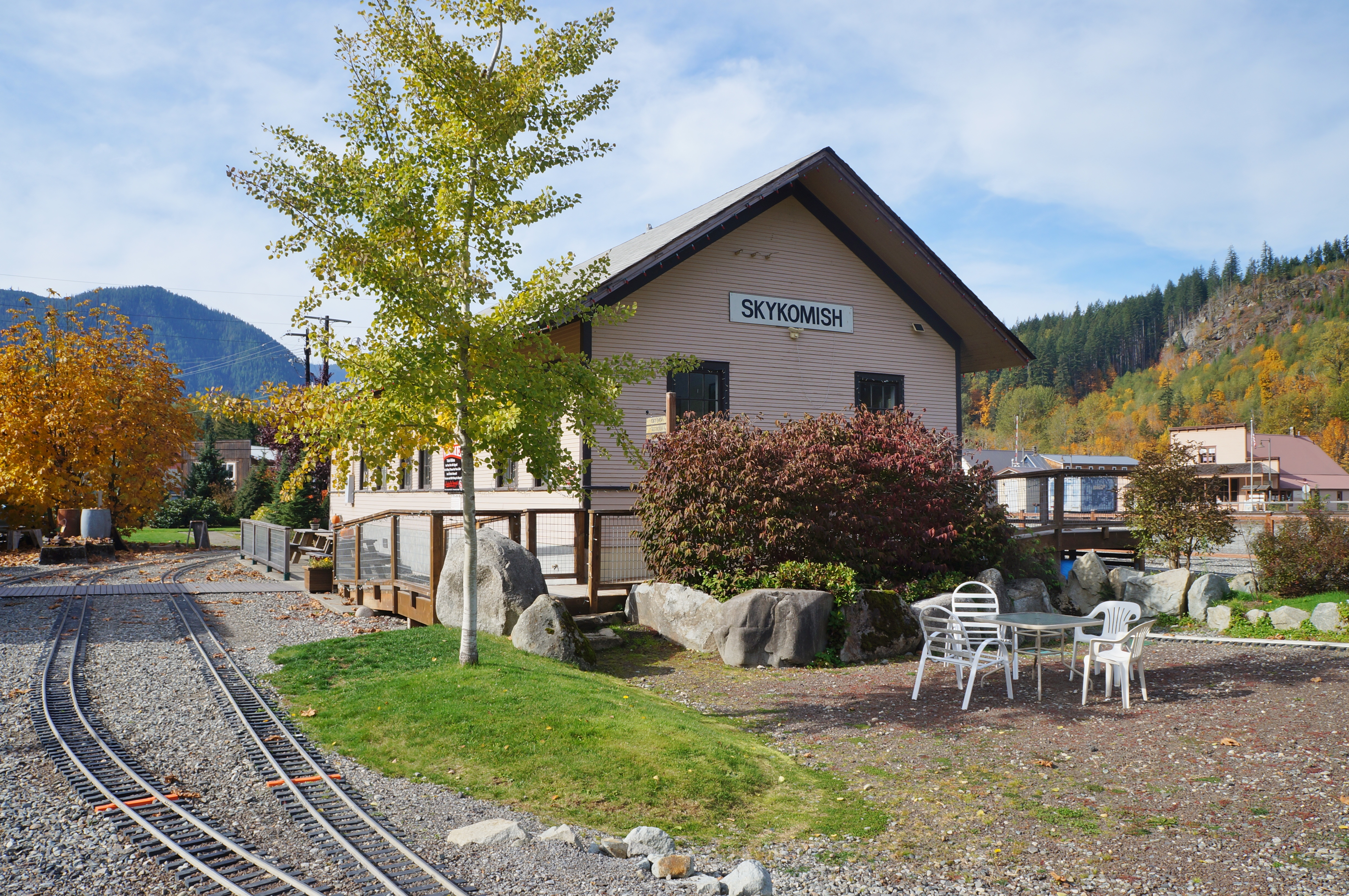
- The depot in 2021 following restoration work
- Location: SE corner of Railroad Ave and 4th St; Skykomish, Washington, U.S.
- Coordinates: 47°42′33″N 121°21′33″W
- Built: 1894
- NRHP reference No.: 97000322
- Added to NRHP: April 14, 1997

The Great Northern Depot in Skykomish, Washington, United States, is a former train station and local history museum. It was built by the Great Northern Railway in 1894 to serve the town of Skykomish, which had been founded as a division point on the railroad. Its original location was on the south side of the tracks at 5th Street. In 1922, the depot was moved to its present location on the north side of the tracks at 4th Street.

The depot is a one-story rectangular wood-frame building. It consisted of a passenger waiting room, the station agent's office and a freight room. The adjacent railyard was used by helper locomotives on the grade up to Stevens Pass.

Passenger service to Skykomish ended in the 1950s, coinciding with the dismantling of Great Northern's electrified system through the town. In 1970, the Great Northern was merged into the Burlington Northern Railroad. The yard and buildings at Skykomish ceased to be used.

The depot was listed in the National Register of Historic Places in 1997 as one of the last Great Northern depots still remaining in Washington state and for its association with railroad development in the state.

The railyard adjacent to the depot had been seeping oil and heavy metals into the ground and nearby Skykomish River for most of the 20th century, requiring extensive environmental remediation. Following the discovery of contaminated soil and groundwater in the 1980s, Burlington Northern and its successor, BNSF Railway, agreed to fund several mitigation and cleanup projects under the supervision of the Washington State Department of Ecology. Most of the buildings in downtown Skykomish, including the depot, were temporarily moved for the cleanup project in the 2000s.

The Great Northern depot was moved to a new city park in 2012 and was renovated for use as a visitors center and history museum, opened in 2014 by the Great Northern and Cascade Railway, a 501c3 nonprofit organization dedicated to sharing the great history of the Great Northern Railway . The area around the depot was developed into a ridable miniature railway that operates seasonally on a 7 1/2 in (190.5 mm) gauge with steam locomotives. A former Great Northern SD9 was previously on display outside the station, but it was removed from display by 2023, having been sold to Inland Northwest Rail Museum.

Preceding station	Great Northern Railway	Following station
Grotto toward Seattle	Main Line	Tonga toward St. Paul
