= Cascades =

Cascades or The Cascades may refer to:

== Places ==
=== North America ===
- Cascade Range or Cascades, a mountain range in the Pacific Northwest of North America
- Cascades (ecoregion), which includes much of the Cascade Range in the Pacific Northwest of North America
- Cascades (conservation area), a wildland in western Virginia
- Cascades, Virginia, a census-designated place
- Cascades Park (Tallahassee), a park in Florida
  - Cascades Rapids or "Cascade Falls", an area of rapids in the Columbia River in Oregon for which the mountain range was named
- Cascade Volcanoes, a geological grouping of volcanoes, including those in the Cascade Range and some in the Coast Mountains
- Fort Cascades, a US Army fort in what is now Washington state (1855–1861)
- "The Cascades", a series of ten waterfalls on Monkman Creek in the Northern Rockies of British Columbia, Canada, including Monkman Falls

=== Elsewhere ===
- Cascades, Hong Kong, a housing estate
- Cascades, Tasmania, Australia, a suburb of Hobart
- Cascades Region, a region in Burkina Faso
- The Cascades (waterfall), on the Waitākere River, West Auckland, New Zealand

== Businesses ==
- Cascades (company), a paper and packaging company headquartered in Quebec, Canada
- Cascades Shopping Centre, Portsmouth, UK

== Music ==
=== Groups ===
- The Cascades (band), a 1960s pop group
- Ronnie & the Hi-Lites, a group originally called The Cascades
- Seattle Cascades Drum and Bugle Corps, a DCI-affiliated junior drum and bugle corps

=== Albums and songs ===
- Cascades (EP), by Jean-Michel Blais and CFCF
- Cascades (Marilyn Crispell album), and title track, 1995
- "Cascades", a song by Metric from Pagans in Vegas
- "Cascades: I'm not your lover", a song from English rock band Deep Purple
- "The Cascades" (rag), a 1904 ragtime composition by Scott Joplin
- "The Cascades", a Fleet Foxes song on Helplessness Blues (2011)

== Rail transportation ==
- Amtrak Cascades, a US passenger train route
- Cascades MAX Station, a light rail station, Portland, Oregon, US
- Cascades Railroad, a defunct short railroad in Washington state, US

== Other uses ==
- Cascades, a series of waterfalls
- The Cascades, a terminus of the Los Angeles Aqueduct, US
- Cascades, Isle of Dogs, a building in London, England
- Cascades FC, a Tasmanian soccer club from 1931 to 1936
- Cascades Female Factory, a former Australian workhouse for female convicts in Hobart, Tasmania
- Oregon State University Cascades Campus, a branch campus in Bend, Oregon, US

== See also ==
- Cascade (disambiguation)
