= Gold Bar, Washington =

Gold Bar
- City
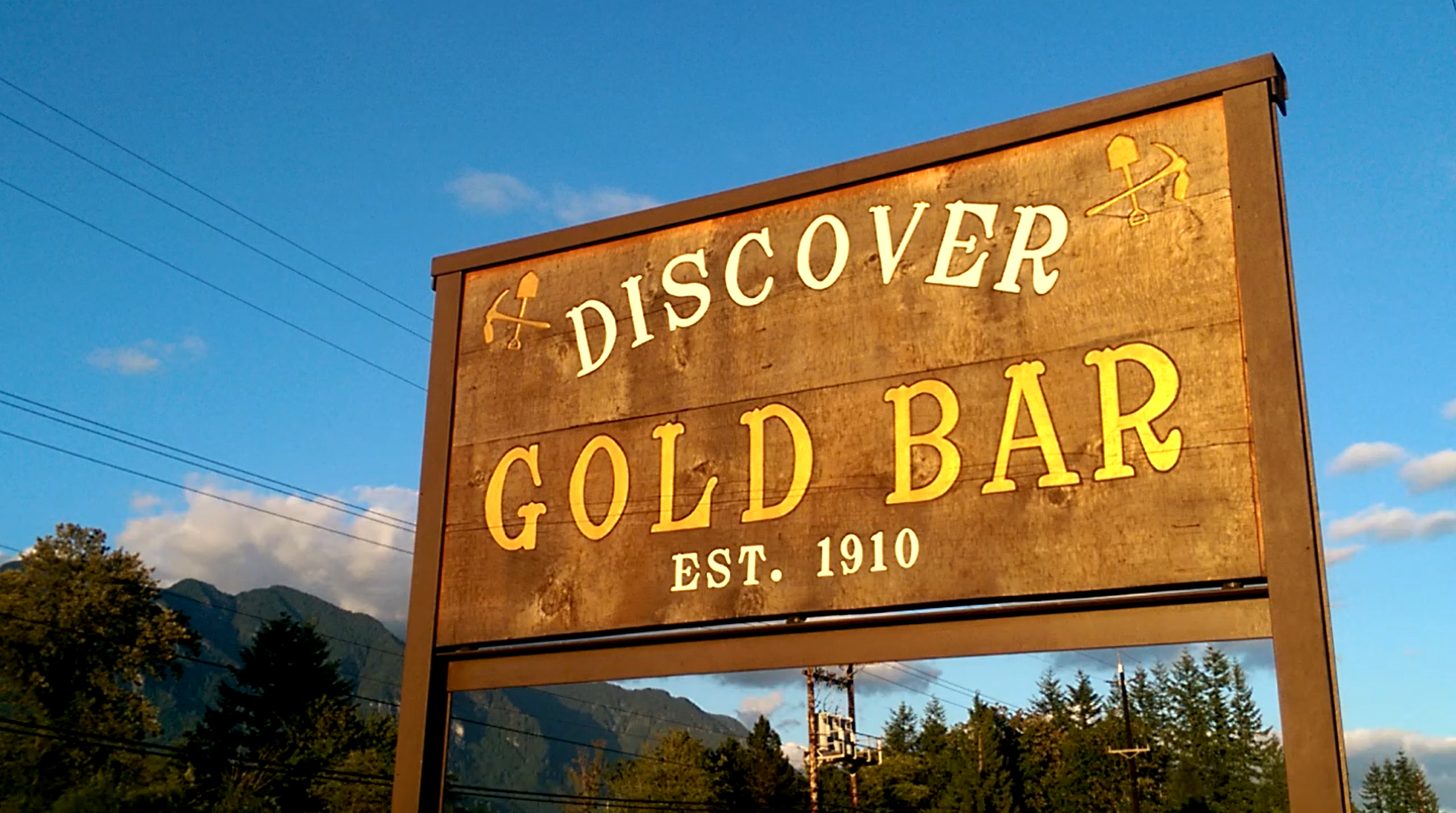
- Welcome sign on U.S. Route 2
- Interactive map of Gold Bar
- Coordinates: 47°51′15″N 121°41′36″W
- Country: United States
- State: Washington
- County: Snohomish
- Incorporated: September 16, 1910

Government
  - Type: Mayor–council
  - Mayor: Steve Yarbrough

Area
  - Total: 1.06 sq mi (2.74 km^{2})
  - Land: 1.06 sq mi (2.74 km^{2})
  - Water: 0 sq mi (0.00 km^{2})
- Elevation: 207 ft (63 m)

Population (2020)
  - Total: 2,403
  - Estimate (2024): 2,478
  - Density: 2,220.1/sq mi (857.19/km^{2})
- Time zone: UTC−8 (Pacific (PST))
  - Summer (DST): UTC−7 (PDT)
- ZIP Code: 98251
- Area code: 360, 564
- FIPS code: 53-27365
- GNIS feature ID: 1520077
- Website: cityofgoldbar.us

Gold Bar is a city in Snohomish County, Washington, United States. It is located on the Skykomish River between Sultan and Index, connected by U.S. Route 2. The population was 2,403 at the 2020 census.

== History ==
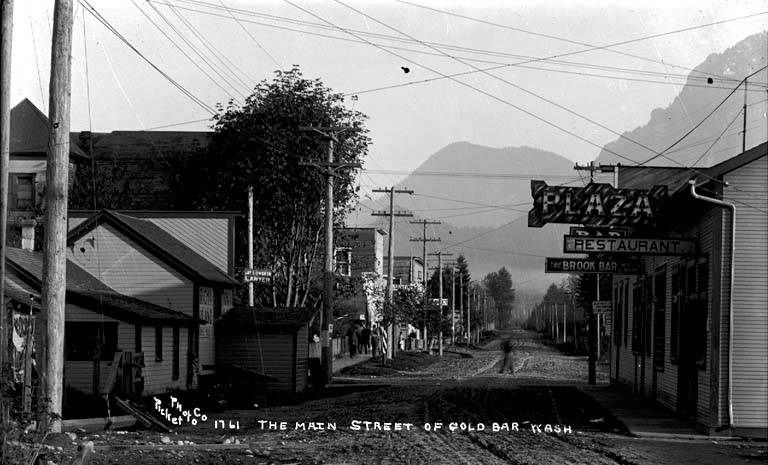
Main Street in Gold Bar, c. 1911

The ancestral home of the indigenous Skykomish people (sq̓ixʷəbš) was in the upper Skykomish Valley east of modern-day Sultan and including the drainage basins of the Sultan and Wallace rivers. They had a permanent village at the confluence of the Skykomish and Wallace rivers, where modern-day Gold Bar lies, named 'xaitəd. The village had a large potlatch house, built to accommodate a number of travelers, and a cemetery; it had an estimated population of 40 families in the late 19th century, representing approximately 240 people. 'xaitəd was used as a base camp for travelers coming to the area to hunt elk in the Sultan River basin. The Skykomish were a signatory party of the 1855 Treaty of Point Elliott and assigned to the Tulalip Indian Reservation at the mouth of the Snohomish River. Many members of the tribe remained in the Skykomish Valley, with as many as 320 non-reservation residents estimated in 1900, but the Skykomish later ceased to have a distinct government and assimilated into the Tulalip Tribes.

The upper Skykomish Valley was visited by prospectors who sought gold deposits, which had been discovered in the Fraser Canyon and triggered a regional gold rush in 1858. A campsite at the confluence of the Skykomish and Wallace rivers was established by prospectors c. 1869 and given the name Gold Bar after a miner found traces of gold on a nearby gravel bar. After Gold Bar became a construction camp for the Great Northern Railway, anti-Chinese sentiment was inflamed by a shooting fray started by disreputable camp followers. To save the lives of the threatened Chinese, construction engineer Eduard Bauer slipped them out of camp in hastily constructed coffins. Gold Bar was officially incorporated on September 16, 1910. The 1940 population was 307.

In the mid-20th century, the city doubled in population as it attracted retirees as well as long-distance commuters to jobs in Everett and Seattle. In the 1990s, Gold Bar gained a new grocery store and several new businesses as it became more of a bedroom community. The city hall was expanded to double its size in 2001 to accommodate growth in the number of employees and services provided by the municipal government.

In 2012, the city government considered disincorporation to avoid bankruptcy due to low sales tax revenue and high expenses attributed to filling public records requests and fighting lawsuits from activist Anne Block. The city council voted against disincorporation and placed a property tax levy on the ballot, which was rejected by voters in November 2012. Block, an employment attorney, published a hyperlocal blog named the Gold Bar Reporter that alleged city officials of corruption and illegal acts. She was later disbarred and ordered in 2018 by a U.S. District Court judge to reimburse the Gold Bar city government $78,000 in attorney fees.

== Geography ==
Gold Bar is situated in the Skykomish Valley, a region of eastern Snohomish County along the Skykomish River in the foothills of the Cascade Mountains. The city is 30 miles (48 km) east of Everett and 40 miles (64 km) west of Stevens Pass, a major route through the Cascades. Gold Bar's boundaries are defined to the southwest by the BNSF Railway's Scenic Subdivision, to the west by 387th Avenue Southeast, to the north by the Wallace River, and to the east by 415th Avenue Southeast. An urban growth area includes areas along May Creek and the Skykomish River. According to the United States Census Bureau, the city has a total area of 1.03 square miles (2.67 km^{2}), all of it land. Of the total area, approximately 66 percent is zoned for residential use (primarily single-family housing) and 19 percent is considered vacant or undeveloped.

The city was built on a narrow plain within the valley that is bordered to the south by the Skykomish River and to the north by the Wallace River. Gold Bar lies on alluvial deposits with an underlayer of gravel. May Creek, a tributary of the Wallace River, passes through the city.

== Economy ==
The city has several small businesses that cater towards tourists who travel on the Stevens Pass Highway, including a snowboard shop and roadside restaurants. A rafting tour company is also based in Gold Bar. According to Economic Alliance Snohomish County, there are 41 total businesses in the city, of which six are classified as food service establishments and six are retailers. As of the 2023 American Community Survey estimates, a total of 1,224 Gold Bar residents over the age of 16 are in the labor force and 4.5 percent are unemployed. The most common employers are in the educational services and healthcare sector, followed by recreation and food services. Approximately 2.9 percent of Gold Bar residents in the labor force work within the city; the most common commuting destinations are Seattle (11.4%), Monroe (7.7%), Sultan (7.5%), and Everett (7.1%). The mean one-way commute for the city's workforce was 47 minutes; 76.1 percent of commuters drove alone to their place of employment, while 10.1 percent worked from home.

== Demographics ==
Historical population
Census	Pop.	Note	%±
1920	353		—
1930	304		−13.9%
1940	307		1.0%
1950	305		−0.7%
1960	315		3.3%
1970	504		60.0%
1980	794		57.5%
1990	1,078		35.8%
2000	2,014		86.8%
2010	2,075		3.0%
2020	2,403		15.8%
2024 (est.)	2,478		3.1%
U.S. Decennial Census; 2020 Census

Gold Bar is the fourth least populous municipality in Snohomish County, with a population of 2,403 at the 2020 census. The city's population grew by nearly 16 percent from 2010 to 2020. As of 2022, Gold Bar has 853 total housing units, of which 592 are single-family and 229 are mobile homes. In 2021, the city's median home value for a single-family unit was $420,120—approximately 62 percent of the county's median. The median household income for Gold Bar residents was $77,708 in 2021.

=== 2020 census ===
As of the 2020 census, there were 2,403 people and 865 households living within Gold Bar's city limits. The city's population density was 2,221.0 inhabitants per square mile (857.5/km^{2}). There were 892 total housing units, of which 97% were occupied and 3% were vacant or for occasional use. The racial makeup of Gold Bar was 89.4% White, 1.1% Black or African American, 1.2% Native American, 0.8% Asian, 0.0% Pacific Islander, and 6.5% from other races. Residents who identified as more than one race were 10.6% of the population. Hispanic or Latino residents of any race were 14.6% of the population.

Of the 865 households in Gold Bar, 52.5% were married couples living together and 9.6% were cohabitating but unmarried. Households with a male householder with no spouse or partner were 22.5% of the population, while households with a female householder with no spouse or partner were 15.4% of the population. Out of all households, 36.8% had children under the age of 18 living with them and 29.2% had residents who were 65 years of age or older. There were 865 occupied housing units in Gold Bar, of which 80.8% were owner-occupied and 19.2% were occupied by renters.

The median age in the city was 37.8 years old for all sexes, 38.1 years old for males, and 37.6 years old for females. Of the total population, 26.9% of residents were under the age of 19; 26.2% were between the ages of 20 and 39; 34.8% were between the ages of 40 and 64; and 12.4% were 65 years of age or older. The gender makeup of the city was 52.3% male and 47.7% female.

=== 2010 census ===
As of the 2010 census, there were 2,075 people, 782 households, and 519 families living within Gold Bar's city limits. The city's population density was 2,014.6 inhabitants per square mile (777.8/km^{2}). There were 837 housing units at an average density of 812.6 per square mile (313.7/km^{2}). The racial makeup of the Gold Bar was 85.1% White, 0.6% African American, 0.7% Native American, 1.0% Asian, 0.7% Pacific Islander, 7.0% from other races, and 4.9% from two or more races. Hispanic or Latino residents of any race were 10.1% of the population.

Of the 782 households in Gold Bar, 37.9% had children under the age of 18 living with them, 48.1% were married couples living together, 10.6% had a female householder with no husband present, 7.7% had a male householder with no wife present, and 33.6% were non-families. 27.1% of all households were made up of individuals, and 6.6% had someone living alone who was 65 years of age or older. The average household size in the city was 2.65 and the average family size was 3.20.

The median age in the city was 36.6 years old. 26.4% of residents were under the age of 18; 8.7% were between the ages of 18 and 24; 29.1% were from 25 to 44; 28.8% were from 45 to 64; and 7% were 65 years of age or older. The gender makeup of the city was 52.8% male and 47.2% female.

== Government and politics ==
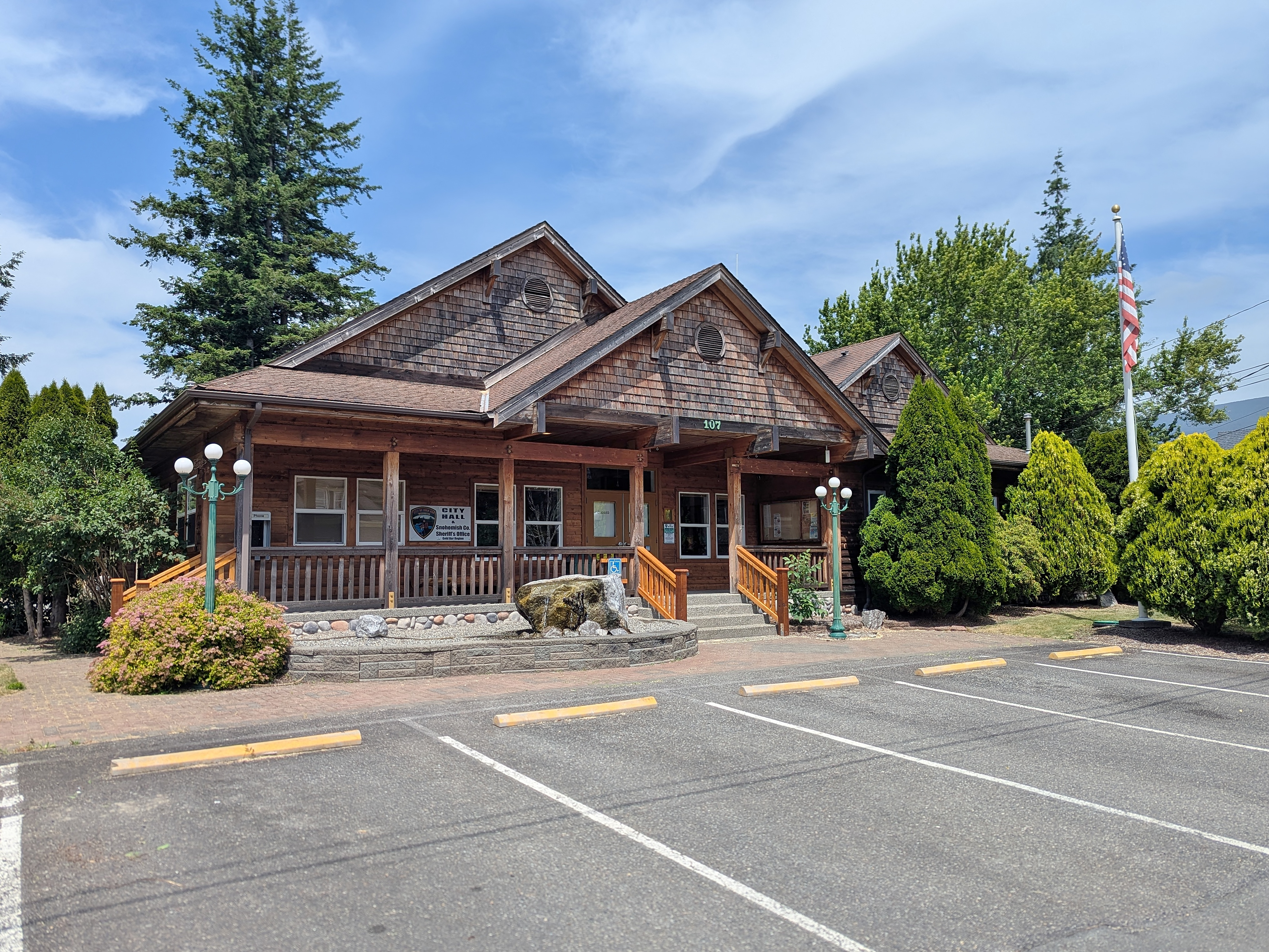
Gold Bar's city hall

Gold Bar is a noncharter code city with a mayor–council government. The city's residents elect a mayor and five members to the city council, all serving four-year terms from at-large seats. The city council serves as the legislative body, while the mayor is empowered to cast tiebreaking votes in addition to their normal duties as the administrator of the city government. Since 2022, the city's mayor has been former councilmember Steve Yarbrough.

The city government has contracted with the Snohomish County Sheriff's Office to provide policing services since it disbanded its own police department in 1994. A sergeant from the sheriff's office serves as Gold Bar's police chief and is based out of a precinct in the city. Gold Bar's volunteer fire department provides fire protection services for a 36-acre (15 ha) area. It is also contracted by King County to provide paramedic services in Skykomish and on the U.S. Route 2 corridor between Gold Bar and Stevens Pass. The city was annexed into the Sno-Isle Libraries system in 1997, becoming the second-to-last municipality in Snohomish County to join.

At the federal level, Gold Bar is part of the 8th congressional district, which encompasses the eastern portions of the Snohomish, King, and Pierce counties as well as the entirety of Chelan and Kittitas counties. It was part of the 1st congressional district until 2022, when the 8th district was extended into Snohomish County. At the state level, the city is part of the 12th legislative district, which also crosses the Cascade Mountains and includes Skykomish, part of Snoqualmie, and most of Chelan County outside of Wenatchee. Gold Bar was previously part of the 39th legislative district until it was moved into the cross-mountain district as part of a redistricting compromise in 2022. The city also lies within the Snohomish County Council's 5th district, which includes the Skykomish Valley, Snohomish, and Lake Stevens.

== Culture ==
The city hosts an annual festival, named Gold Dust Days, over a weekend in late July that includes a parade, a street fair with vendors and food, live music, a car show, and a beauty pageant. It was founded in 2007 and also has events to commemorate the history of the Skykomish Valley, such as gold panning demonstrations and historical reenactments of battles. Gold Bar is also home to an annual Memorial Day picnic. The city, along with neighboring Sultan and Index, was a filming location for the 2016 movie Captain Fantastic. Until 2003, Gold Bar was the home of the Washington Serpentarium, a privately-operated reptile zoo. It relocated to the Monroe area after the number of visitors, which reached 35,000 in 2002, outgrew the initial building.

== Parks and recreation ==
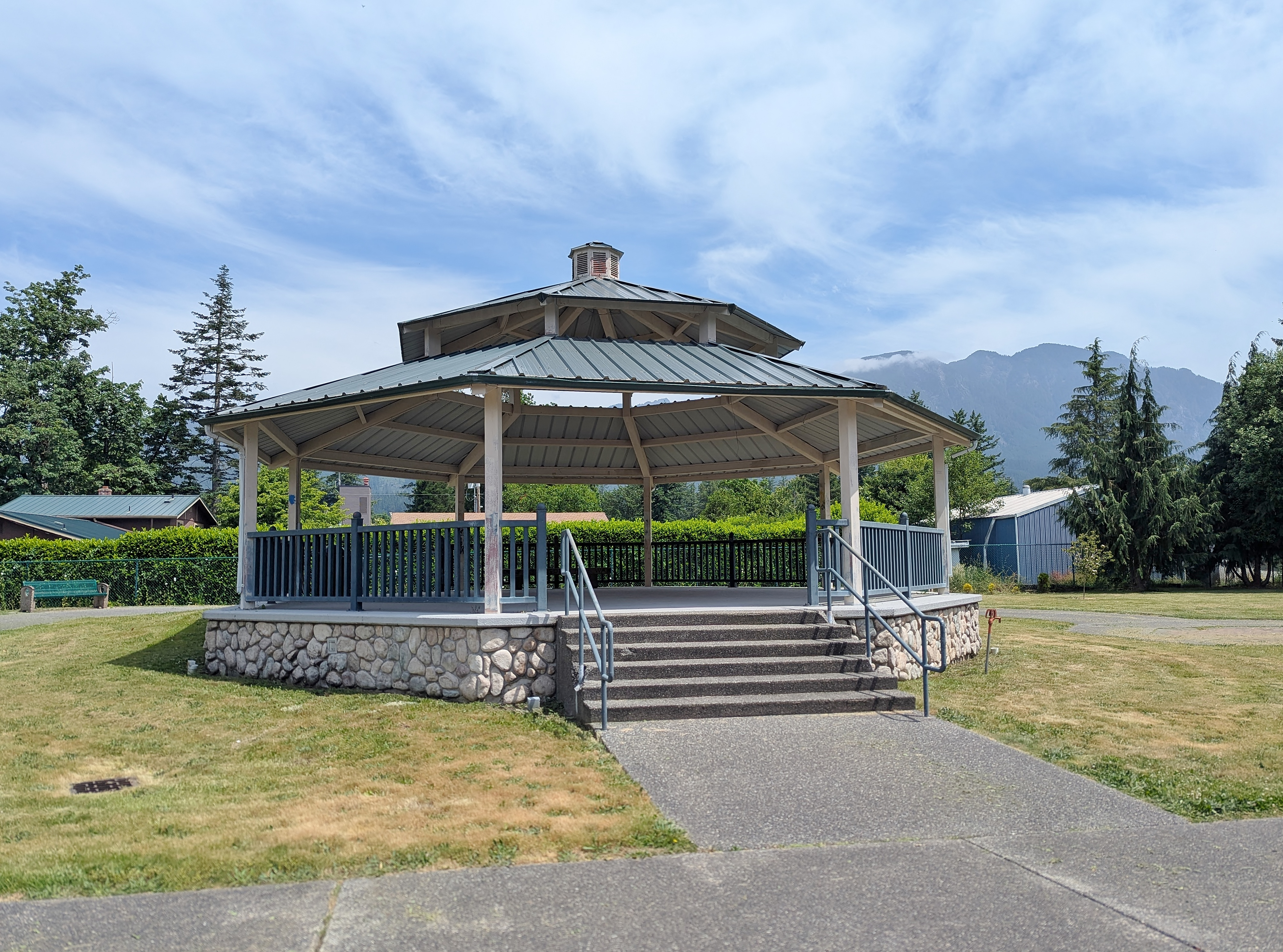
A gazebo at Gateway Community Park

The city government maintains 17.1 acres (6.9 ha) of parks and open space within Gold Bar. These include Railroad Avenue Park on U.S. Route 2, which has picnic facilities and a dog park, and Gateway Community Park, which opened in 2004. Several undeveloped facilities are also planned for future parks by the city government. Gold Bar is adjacent to Wallace Falls State Park, located 2 miles (3.2 km) northeast of the city limits. It is one of the most popular outdoor attractions in Snohomish County, with over 186,000 total visitors in 2024, which has resulted in parking issues on nearby roads. The park has a 5.6-mile (9.0 km) hiking trail to its eponymous waterfalls with a total elevation gain of 1,300 feet (400 m)—among the lowest in the Cascades. The state parks system also maintains a boat launch on the Skykomish River at Big Eddy.

The area around Gold Bar has facilities for various forms of outdoor recreation, including hiking, fishing, skiing, and rafting. The Skykomish River is used for whitewater rafting and includes sets of Class IV and V rapids, including one named the "Boulder Drop", around Gold Bar. The Reiter Foothills, a 10,000-acre (4,000 ha) forest managed by the Washington State Department of Natural Resources, is located two miles (3.2 km) northeast of Gold Bar. It includes hiking trails and paths for off-road driving that were developed beginning in the 1960s. The area has been proposed for formal protection as a state park but remains open to permitted logging.

== Education ==
The city lies within the boundaries of the Sultan School District, which serves 30 square miles (78 km^{2}) of the Skykomish Valley and has over 2,000 enrolled students. Gold Bar originally had its own school district until it was consolidated with the Sultan School District in 1969; the two districts previously had an agreement to bus middle and high school students to Sultan and share some capital costs for Sultan High School. Gold Bar's elementary school had an enrollment of 313 total students in the 2024–25 school year. It opened in 1992 after Sultan's enrollment had exceeded capacity, but itself became overcrowded due to unexpected population growth. The city is part of the Sno-Isle Libraries district and its nearest branch is in Sultan.

== Infrastructure ==
=== Transportation ===
Gold Bar is connected to nearby cities by U.S. Route 2, which continues west towards Monroe and Everett and east over Stevens Pass towards Wenatchee and Spokane. The highway carries a daily average of over 12,000 vehicles through Gold Bar and has a 80-foot (24 m) right-of-way. U.S. Route 2 is frequently congested during weekends due to recreational traffic, which also causes backups on rural roads that split from the highway. The city is also bisected by the Scenic Subdivision of BNSF Railway, which carries freight and Amtrak passenger trains along the Skykomish River. Community Transit operates two bus routes from Gold Bar to other cities on the U.S. Route 2 corridor, with direct service to Everett Station. The agency previously operated express routes that continued beyond Everett Station to the Boeing Everett Factory.

=== Utilities ===
Electric power for the city is provided by the Snohomish County Public Utility District (PUD), a consumer-owned public utility that serves all of Snohomish County. The utility derives most of its electricity from hydroelectricity that it purchases from the federal Bonneville Power Administration or generates on its own. Natural gas for the Gold Bar's residents and businesses is provided by Puget Sound Energy, a private company. The city government contracts with Waste Management to collect household garbage and recycling.

Gold Bar's municipal tap water system serves 678 residential and non-residential connections with 51,000 feet (16,000 m) of pipes. It is sourced from four groundwater wells and stored at a series of three reservoirs with a combined normal capacity of 263,532 US gallons (997,580 L). The PUD also operates a well in the area that is able to supply water to Gold Bar in the event of an emergency or repairs to other facilities. The city lacks a sanitary sewer system due to the high cost of a sewage treatment plant; most buildings instead rely on septic tanks. Stormwater runoff is not directly managed by the city government and generally drains into the Skykomish River basin through various facilities, such as bioswales and underground vaults.

=== Healthcare ===
The city lies within the public hospital district for EvergreenHealth Monroe, the only full-service medical facility in the Skykomish Valley. Gold Bar is the home base for a mobile medical clinic established by Acadia Healthcare and the Snohomish County government in 2025 to address the opioid epidemic in rural communities.
