= Cascade, Nebraska =

Unincorporated community in Nebraska, United States

- Unincorporated Community
- Location within Nebraska Location within the United States
- Coordinates: 42.2°N 100.4°W
- Country: United States
- State: Nebraska
- County: Cherry

Cascade is an unincorporated community in Cherry County, Nebraska, United States.

== History ==
A post office was established at Cascade in 1899, and remained in operation until it was discontinued in 1955.
