= Cascada (hotel) =

Hotel and spa in Portland, Oregon, U.S.

- Logo

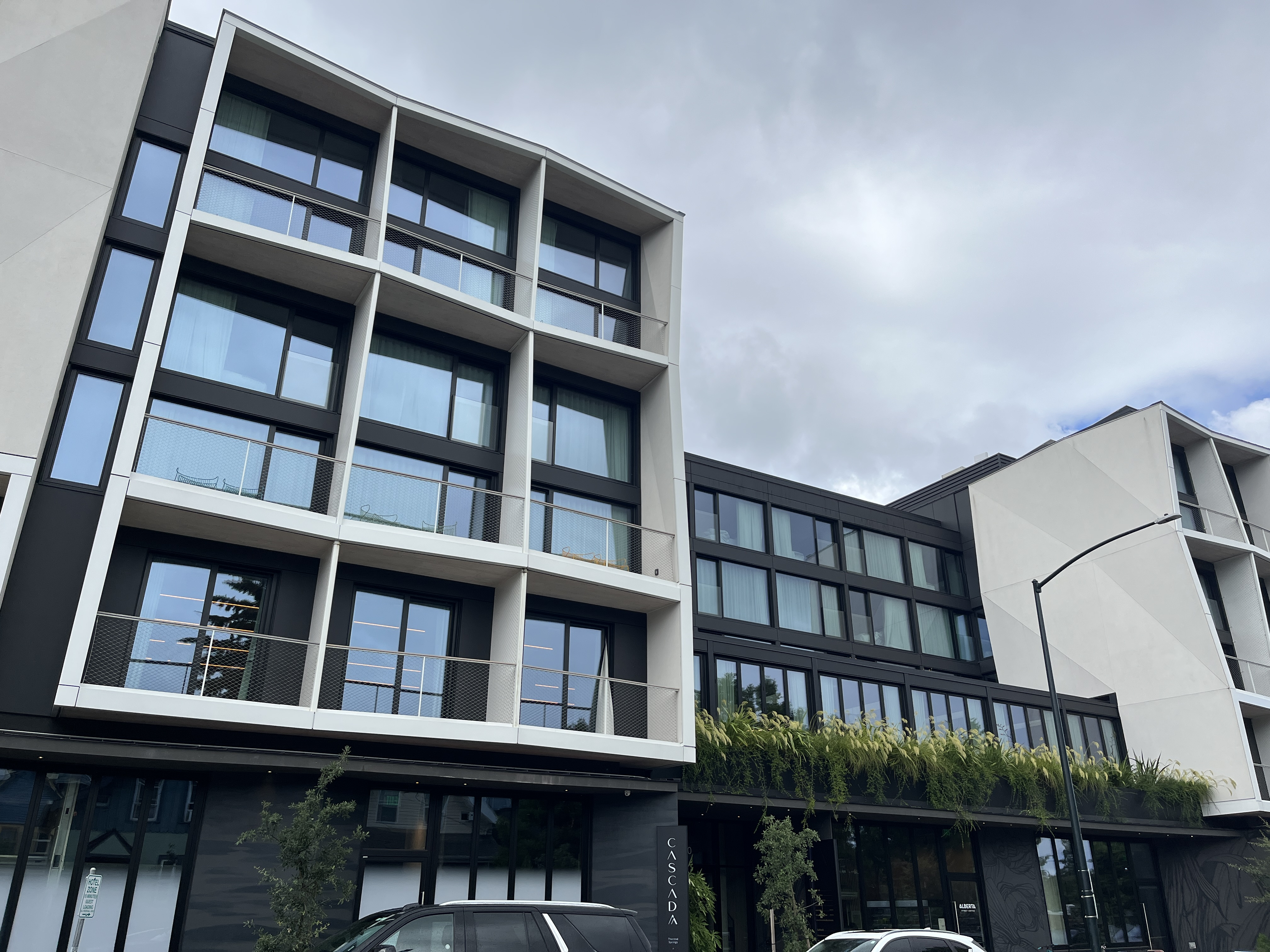
- The hotel's exterior, 2026
- Interactive map of the Cascada area

General information
- Location: 1150 NE Alberta Street, Portland, Oregon, United States
- Coordinates: 45°33′32″N 122°39′14″W

Cascada is a hotel and spa in Portland, Oregon, United States. It opened in 2025, in northeast Portland's King neighborhood. In 2026, Esquire included Cascada in a list of the world's best new hotels. The property has four pools, a sauna, and a steam room.

In 2026, Cascada announced plans to open a second location in Bend, Oregon, in 2028.
