= Cascade, California =

Unincorporated community in California, United States

Cascade
- Unincorporated community
- Location in California Cascade (the United States)
- Coordinates: 39°42′00″N 121°10′42″W
- Country: United States
- State: California
- County: Plumas
- Elevation: 4,055 ft (1,236 m)
- GNIS feature ID: 258029

Cascade (formerly, Cascade City) is an unincorporated community in Plumas County, California, United States. It lies at an elevation of 4055 feet (1236 m). Cascade is located 20 miles (32.2 km) southwest of Quincy.
