= Cascade Creek (South Dakota) =

Stream in South Dakota, United States

Coordinates: 43°18′24″N 103°34′01″W

Cascade Creek is a stream in the U.S. state of South Dakota.

== History ==
Cascade Creek was received its name on account of rapids near its mouth.

== See also ==
- List of rivers of South Dakota
