= Cascade River =

The Cascade River is a placename that can mean:

- Cascade River (Alberta) (Canada), a tributary of the Bow River
- Cascade River (Ontario) (Canada)
- Cascade River (Mindanao) (Philippines)
- Cascade River (Minnesota) (United States)
- Cascade River (New Zealand)
- Cascade River (Nunavut) (Canada), a minor river on the Meta Incognita Peninsula on Baffin Island
- Cascade River (Tasmania) (Australia)
- Cascade River (Washington) (United States)

== See also ==
- Cascade Creek (disambiguation)
- Cascade (disambiguation)
