= Collisional cascading =

Collisional cascading may refer to:

- Collision cascade, collisions of atoms induced by an energetic particle in a solid or liquid
- Kessler syndrome or collisional cascading
