= Grotto, Washington =

Unincorporated community in Washington, United States

- Unincorporated community
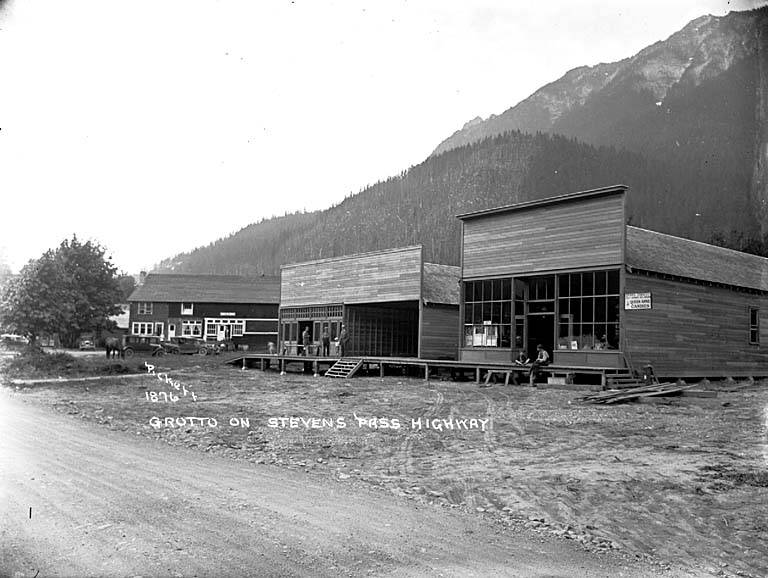
- 1913 street scene at Grotto

- Location in Washington and the United States Grotto (the United States)
- Coordinates: 47°44′10″N 121°25′24″W
- Country: United States
- State: Washington
- County: King
- Elevation: 889 ft (271 m)
- Time zone: UTC-8 (Pacific (PST))
  - Summer (DST): UTC-7 (PDT)
- GNIS feature ID: 1520375

Grotto is a small unincorporated community in King County, Washington, United States. It is located on U.S. Route 2 west of Stevens Pass in the Cascade Mountains, near the town of Skykomish.

A post office called Grotto was established in 1910. The community was named for gorges near the original town site.
