= Cascades Shopping Centre =

Shopping mall in Portsmouth, Hampshire, England

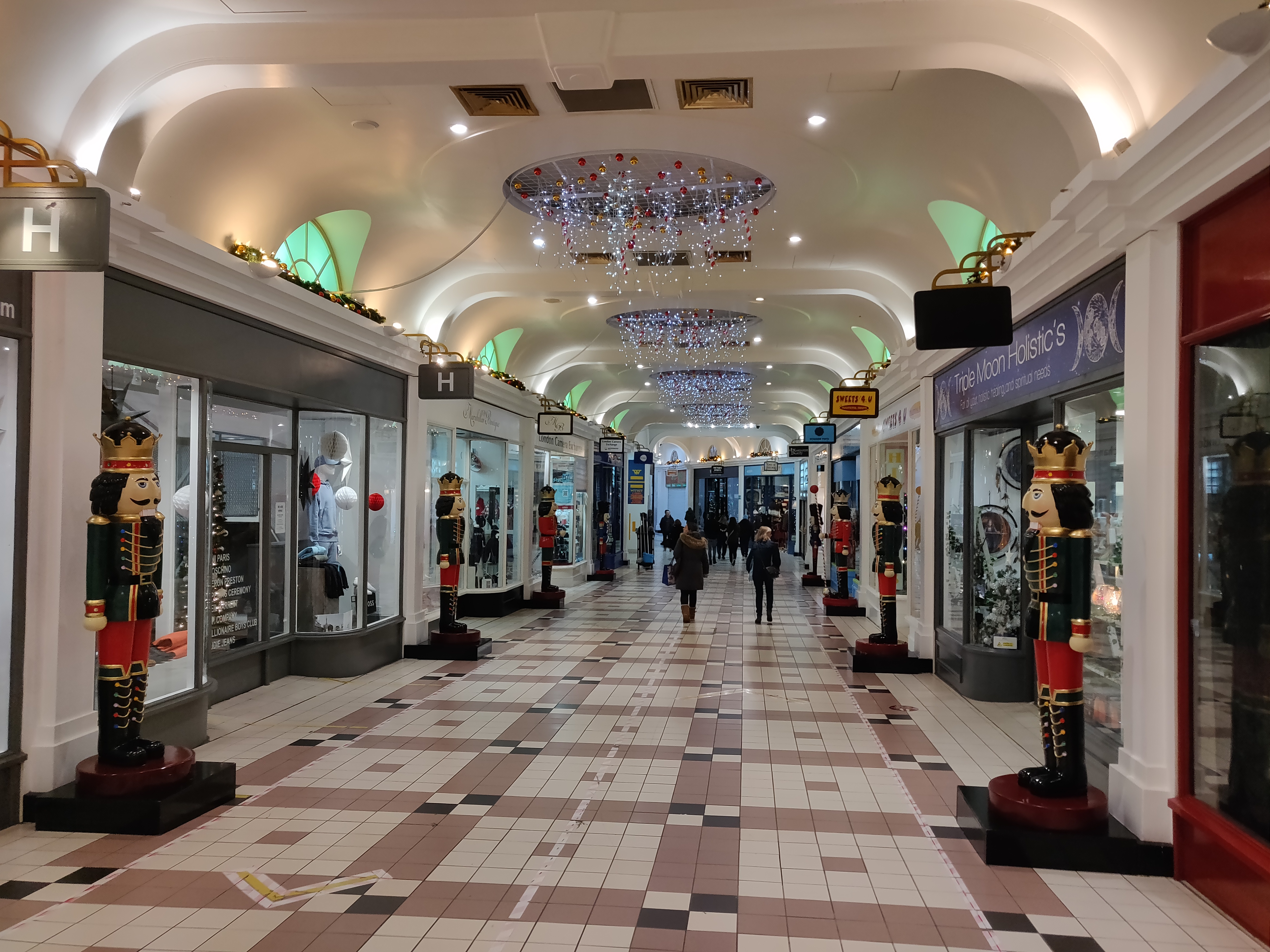
- Location: Portsmouth, Hampshire England
- Opened: 26 September 1989
- Developer: Taylor Woodrow Construction
- Manager: JLL
- Architect: Chapman Taylor & Partners
- Num. of stores: 60 active
- Floors: 1
- Website: cascades-shopping.co.uk

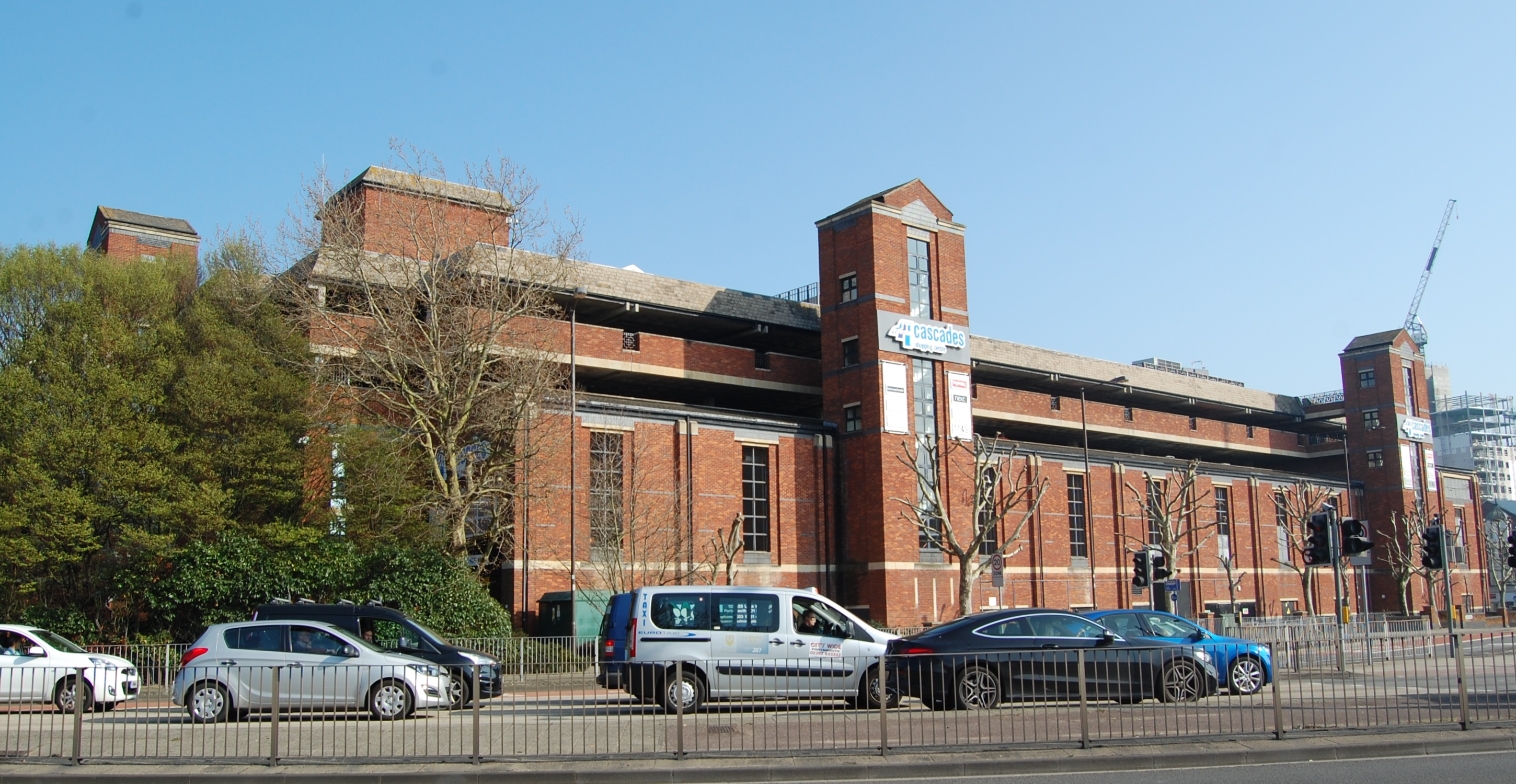
Exterior of the Cascades Shopping Centre

Entrance to the Cascades Shopping Centre on Commercial Road

Cascades Shopping Centre is an enclosed shopping centre in the city centre of Portsmouth on the South Coast of England. It has a wide range of High Street retailers, and its own multi-storey car park connecting straight into the malls by lifts and stairs.

The building contract, described variously as worth £40 million, £45 million or £50 million, was won in 1987 by Taylor Woodrow Construction. As originally designed, the shopping centre had 300,000 square feet (28,000 m^{2}) of retail space on a site covering 6.5 acres (2.6 ha) overall. The anchor tenant was British Home Stores, with an 80,000-square-foot (7,400 m^{2}) shop; existing city-centre stores belonging to C&A, Littlewoods and Marks & Spencer were expanded into the new centre. A 600-vehicle multi-storey car park was built into the centre, which also had a food court. Work began on the centre in May 1987 and it opened in September 1989. The site was previously occupied by Charlotte Street and Moores Square, where a regular street market was held. The city council had announced that the stalls would be moved to a new location at the end of February 1987, but by late April – when redevelopment work was underway – they had still not been relocated.

The Centre had a £20m redevelopment of the ground and lower ground floors during 2006/2007. The food hall was converted to shopping floorspace and the open atrium above it was filled in to provide an extra 2,500 square metres of retail space and 54 additional car park spaces. The new mall was opened by the Lord Mayor of Portsmouth Councillor Mike Blake at an official ceremony on 29 May 2007.

However, the demolition of the Tricorn Centre and the delay on the redevelopment of the area by Portsmouth City Council has created a large car park immediately outside; whilst the closure of Woolworths has rendered a large retail unit that was unused for many years, until Primark bought the unit to use to expand their store. This has made the redevelopment, with its consequent loss of smaller shops and food outlets, largely unnecessary. The redevelopment removed the food court, the iconic glass lifts and large naturally lit atrium.

The shopping centre was offered up for sale in 2021 by its owner RPMI Railpen, with a asking price of £18 million.

== Stores ==
Cascades has over 60 shop units. Over the years, many of the bigger names have left the premises, and more independent shops have taken their place. The large Marks & Spencer store, which was one of the main tenants, closed in 2018 with most of its existing staff being moved to the chain's Food Hall located on the Ocean Retail Park in Copnor.

Shops located inside include Sports Direct, Next, Primark, New Look and TK Maxx.
