= Sentinel Peak (Washington) =

Mountain in Washington (state), United States

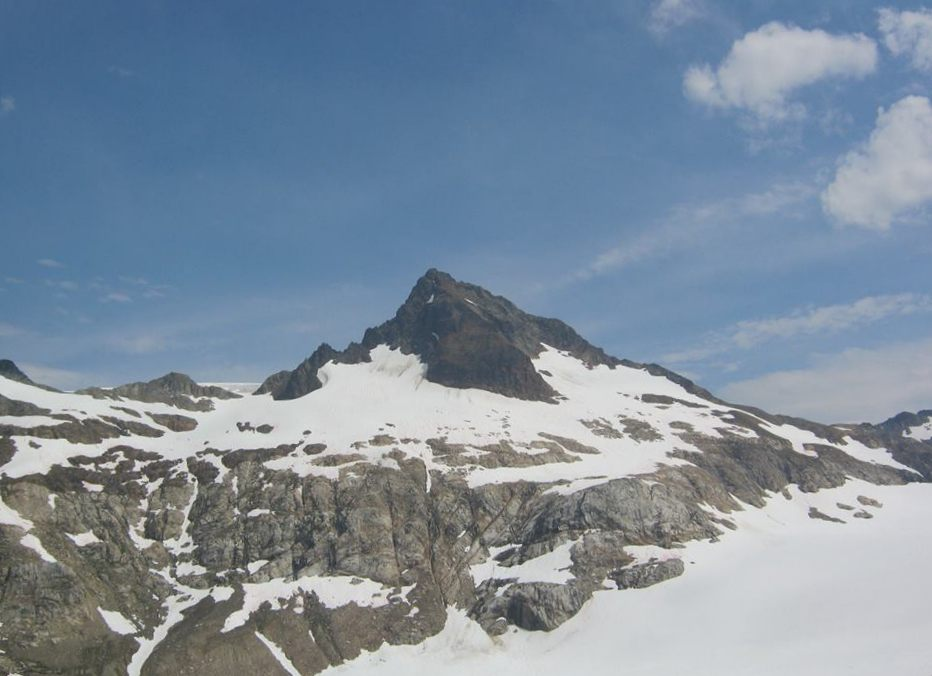

Highest point
- Elevation: 8,266 ft (2,519 m) NAVD 88
- Coordinates: 48°21′22″N 121°02′27″W

Geography
- Location within Washington (state) Location within the United States
- Location: Skagit County, Washington, U.S.
- Parent range: Cascade Range, North Cascades
- Topo map: USGS Dome Peak

Sentinel Peak is a 8,266-foot (2,519-metre) mountain located in the Glacier Peak Wilderness of Washington's North Cascades. The summit is part of the Ptarmigan Traverse. The mountain is situated on the crest of the Cascade Range, on the shared border of Snohomish County and Chelan County, also straddling the boundary between the Mount Baker-Snoqualmie National Forest and the Wenatchee National Forest. The South Cascade Glacier lies below its western slope, and the LeConte Glacier lies on the northeast slope. Its nearest higher peak is Spire Point, 3.03 mi (4.88 km) to the south-southwest.

== Climate ==
Sentinel Peak is located in the marine west coast climate zone of western North America. Most weather fronts originate in the Pacific Ocean, and travel northeast toward the Cascade Mountains. As fronts approach the North Cascades, they are forced upward by the peaks of the Cascade Range, causing them to drop their moisture in the form of rain or snowfall onto the Cascades (Orographic lift). As a result, the west side of the North Cascades experiences high precipitation, especially during the winter months in the form of snowfall. Due to its temperate climate and proximity to the Pacific Ocean, areas west of the Cascade Crest very rarely experience temperatures below 0 °F (−18 °C) or above 80 °F (27 °C). During winter months, weather is usually cloudy, but, due to high pressure systems over the Pacific Ocean that intensify during summer months, there is often little or no cloud cover during the summer.

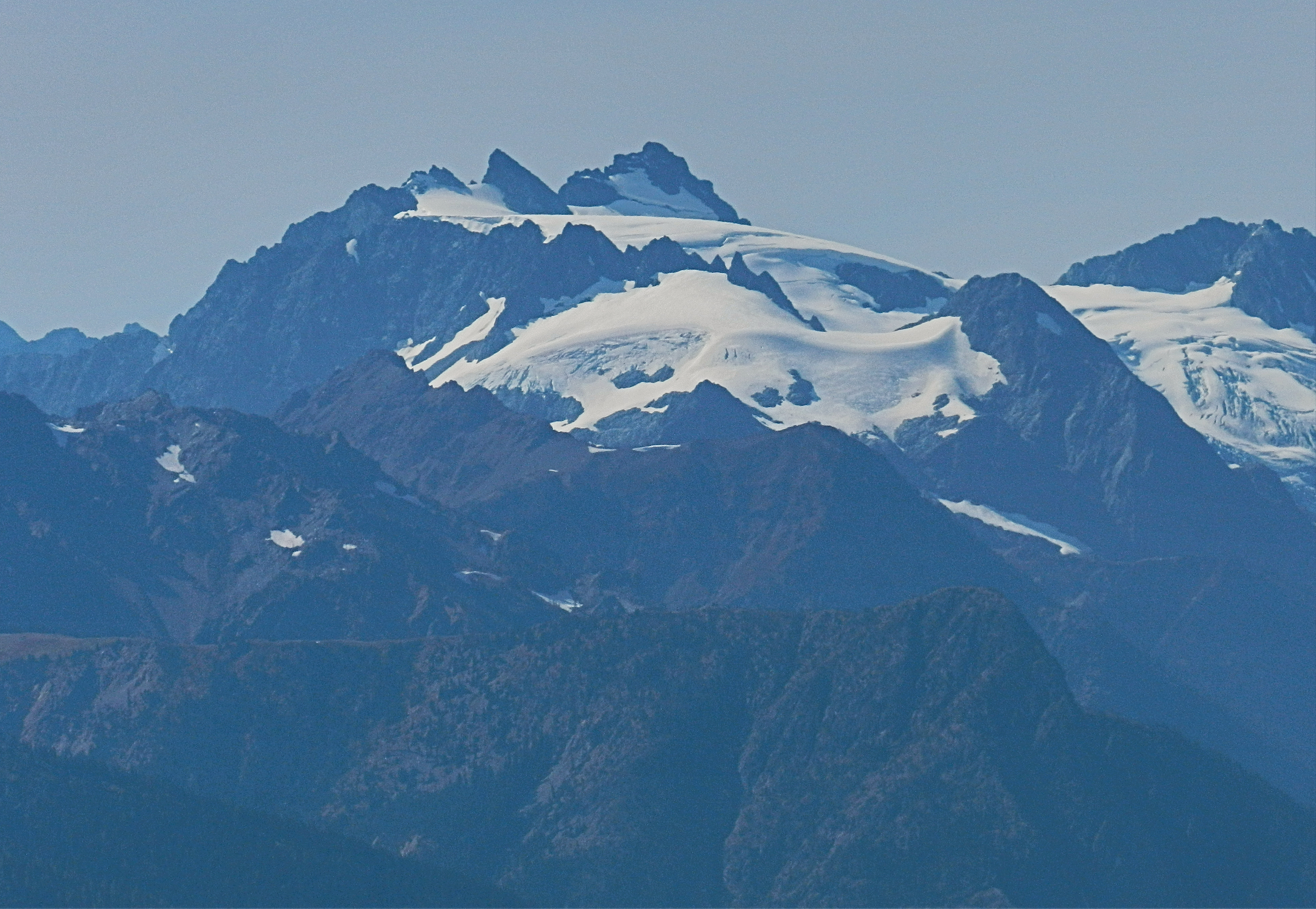
Sentinel Peak from the northeast near Maple Pass

== Geology ==
The North Cascades features some of the most rugged topography in the Cascade Range with craggy peaks, ridges, and deep glacial valleys. Geological events occurring many years ago created the diverse topography and drastic elevation changes over the Cascade Range leading to various climate differences. These climate differences lead to vegetation variety defining the ecoregions in this area.

The history of the formation of the Cascade Mountains dates back millions of years ago to the late Eocene Epoch. With the North American Plate overriding the Pacific Plate, episodes of volcanic igneous activity persisted. Glacier Peak, a stratovolcano that is 17.22 mi (27.71 km) south-southwest of Sentinel Peak, began forming in the mid-Pleistocene. In addition, small fragments of the oceanic and continental lithosphere called terranes created the North Cascades about 50 million years ago.

During the Pleistocene period dating back over two million years ago, glaciation advancing and retreating repeatedly scoured the landscape leaving deposits of rock debris. The U-shaped cross section of the river valleys is a result of recent glaciation. Uplift and faulting in combination with glaciation have been the dominant processes which have created the tall peaks and deep valleys of the North Cascades area.

== See also ==
- Mount Baker-Snoqualmie National Forest
- Okanogan-Wenatchee National Forest
