= South Cascade Glacier =

Glacier in the state of Washington

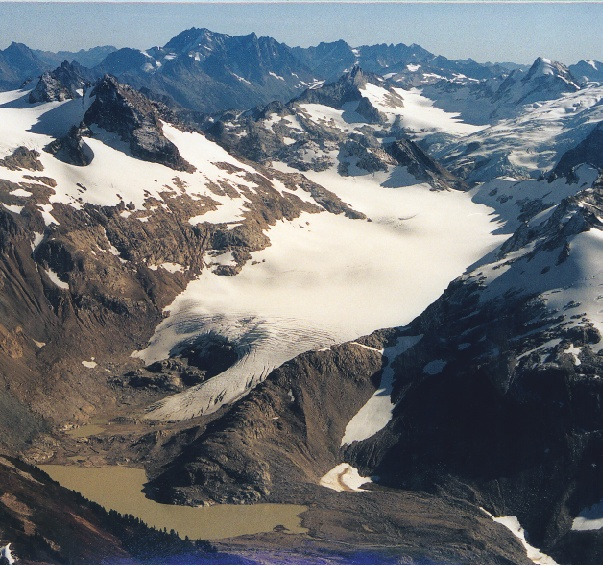
- South Cascade Glacier, October 2000. Note how far the glacier has retreated since the 1965 photo below.

- Location within Washington (state)
- Type: Alpine glacier
- Location: North Cascades, Skagit County, Washington, USA
- Coordinates: 48°21′36″N 121°03′27″W
- Length: 1.3 mi (2.1 km)
- Terminus: Talus/moraine
- Status: Retreating

South Cascade Glacier is a large alpine glacier in the North Cascades of Washington, USA. It is bordered on the east by 8,261-foot (2,518 m) Sentinel Peak, and is about 17 mi (27 km) north of Glacier Peak in the Glacier Peak Wilderness. Meltwater from the glacier flows directly into South Cascade Lake, which feeds the South Fork Cascade River, which is a tributary of the Skagit River.

South Cascade Glacier is one of the four "benchmark glaciers" that is monitored by the USGS and its mass balance has been monitored since 1959. Its area has declined from 2.71 km^{2} in 1958 to 1.8 km^{2} in 2015 representing an area loss of 34%. Between 1958 and 2009 South Cascade Glacier lost nearly a half of its volume.

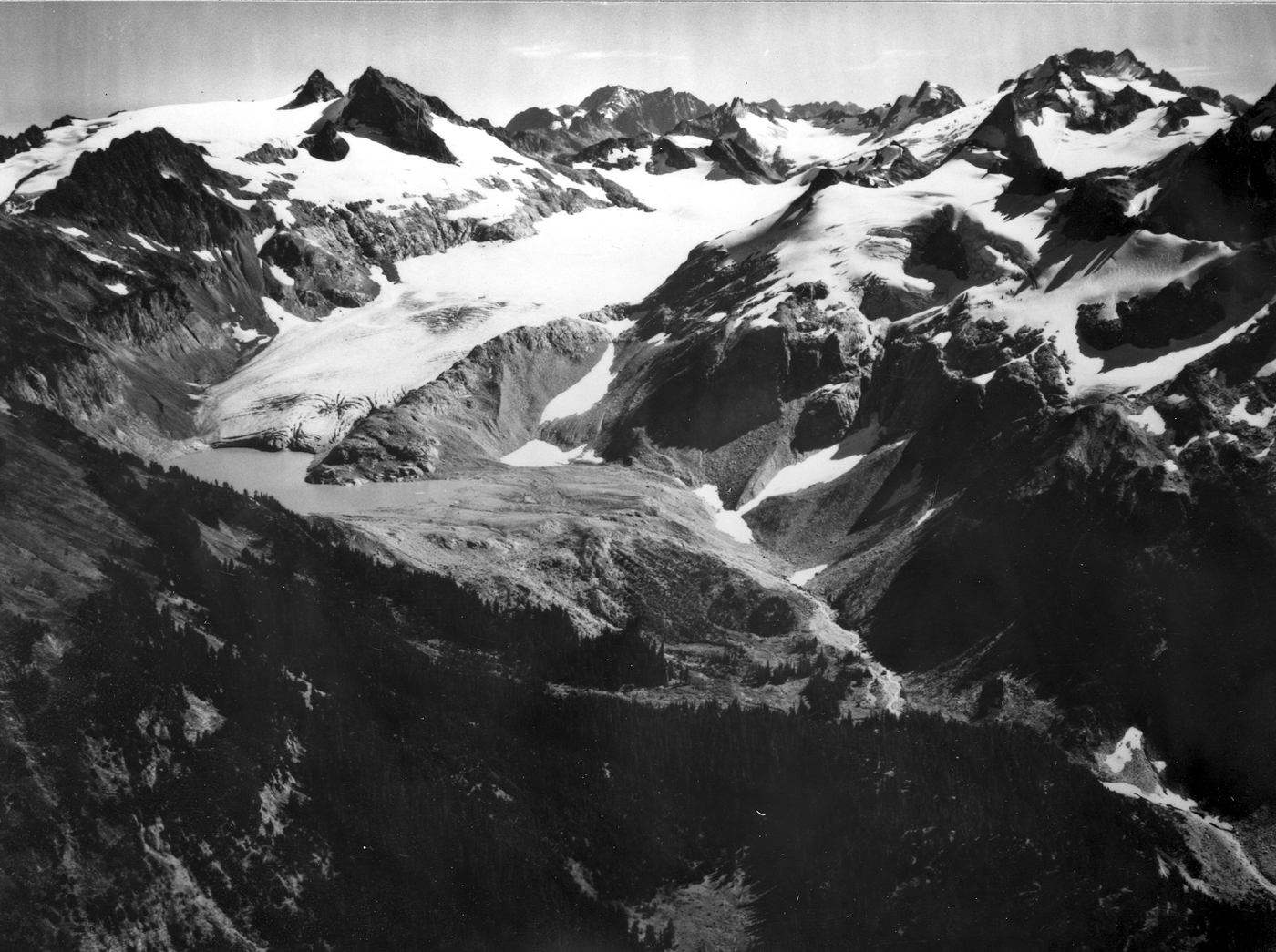
South Cascade Glacier on September 23, 1965

== See also ==
- Ptarmigan Traverse
- Retreat of glaciers since 1850
- List of glaciers in the United States
