= Cascadian (train) =

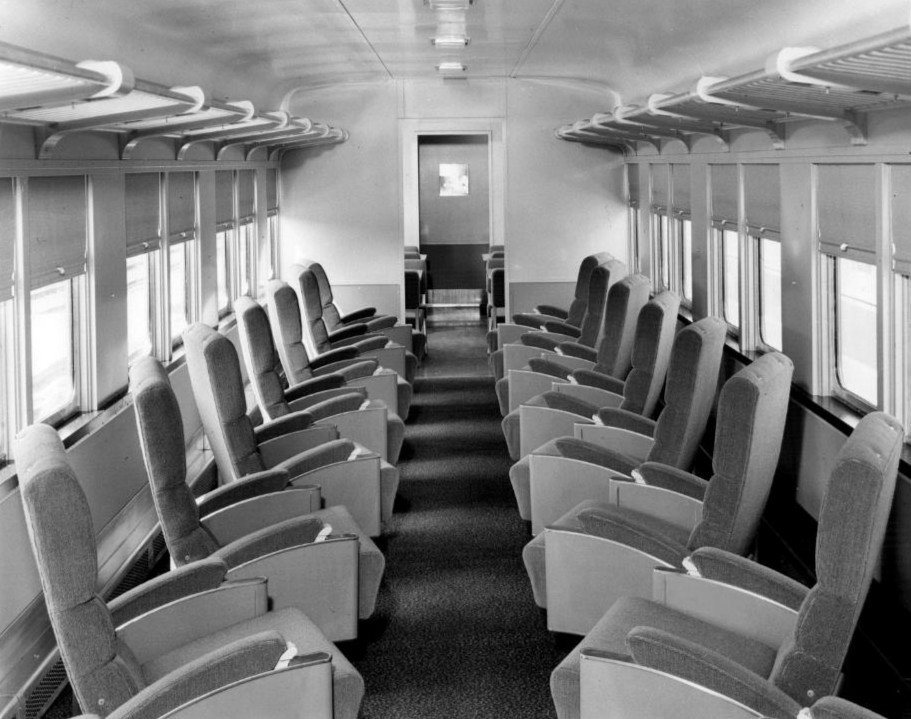
- Photo of the coach segment of the combination coach/cafe cars

Overview
- Service type: Inter-city rail
- Status: Discontinued
- Locale: Washington
- First service: October 1929
- Last service: August 15, 1959
- Former operator: Great Northern Railway

Route
- Termini: King Street Station, Seattle, Washington (until February 1959), Everett, Washington (after February 1959); Spokane station
- Distance travelled: 330 miles (530 km)
- Service frequency: Daily
- Train number: 5/6

Technical
- Track gauge: 1,435 mm (4 ft 8 1/2 in)

The Cascadian was an American named train of the Great Northern Railway on its route between Seattle and Spokane, Washington. The service was introduced in October 1929, then re-equipped as a streamliner in 1954. The train's last run was in 1959.

== History ==
Soon after its debut, Great Northern introduced through sleeping car service from Seattle to Chicago via the Cascadian.

The Cascadian was officially listed as a streamliner on August 15, 1954. The Great Northern Railway operated a daylight train between Seattle and Spokane that traversed the Cascade Mountains through the Cascade Tunnel. It then descended the eastern slopes through the Cashmere – Wenatchee apple growing region before crossing the Columbia River and climbing up to the high Columbia plateau and the wheat fields of the Inland Empire.

The Cascadian was a slow all-stops local train that required nine hours in either direction for the 330 miles (531 km) between Seattle and Spokane. U.S. Postal Service officials even proposed that the train's layover in Wenatchee should be lengthened to four hours to facilitate mail handling there. Most passengers between these points traveled in the Empire Builder or Western Star overnight.

In mid-February 1959, the western terminus for the service was switched to Everett; passenger service to Seattle was then handled through a transfer onto the Great Northern's Seattle–Vancouver International trains. This led to a strike call by the Order of Railway Conductors and Brakemen citing a loss in mileage-based pay, but a temporary restraining order blocked the strike. In its final months of operation, after a year of costs exceeding revenue by more than $100,000, the train had been reduced to just one coach and one baggage car. The Cascadian made its last run on August 15, 1959.

== Rolling stock ==
Each of the two train sets consisted of a baggage-storage-mail car, a baggage 30-foot railway post office car — both generally heavyweights but painted in the Empire Builder dark-green and orange color scheme. Next came prewar 58 seat Luxury Coaches in the 938–943 class with up to three being assigned to each consist on the busiest days. When the Cascadian was officially listed as a streamliner on August 15, 1954, it was when the railroad added the café-coach cars to the Cascadians. These cars, originally heavyweights, had recently been remodeled and streamlined by GN shops in Minneapolis and carried the markers for the Cascadians. These cars featured 18 revenue coach seats and a café with seating for sixteen. The Cascadian was powered by either EMD F-units or passenger-equipped GP units between Seattle and Scenic, and between Wenatchee and Spokane. Between Scenic and Wenatchee was the electrified district of the Great Northern Railway and electric locomotives were assigned as power in this area until the electrified zone was discontinued in 1956. At that time, whatever power assigned in Spokane or Seattle ran through.

Train consists
Consist 1	Car type	Consist 2
273A	EMD F7A 1,500 hp (1.12 MW) diesel passenger cab unit	274A
273B	EMD F7A 1,500 hp diesel passenger cab unit	274B
52	Baggage 30-foot railway post office car	53
262	Baggage express storage mail car	263
938	58-Revenue seat coach	939
940	58-Revenue seat coach	941
942	58-Revenue seat coach	943
1060	18-Revenue seat coach 16-seat café	1061
