= Startup, Washington =

- Census-designated place (CDP)
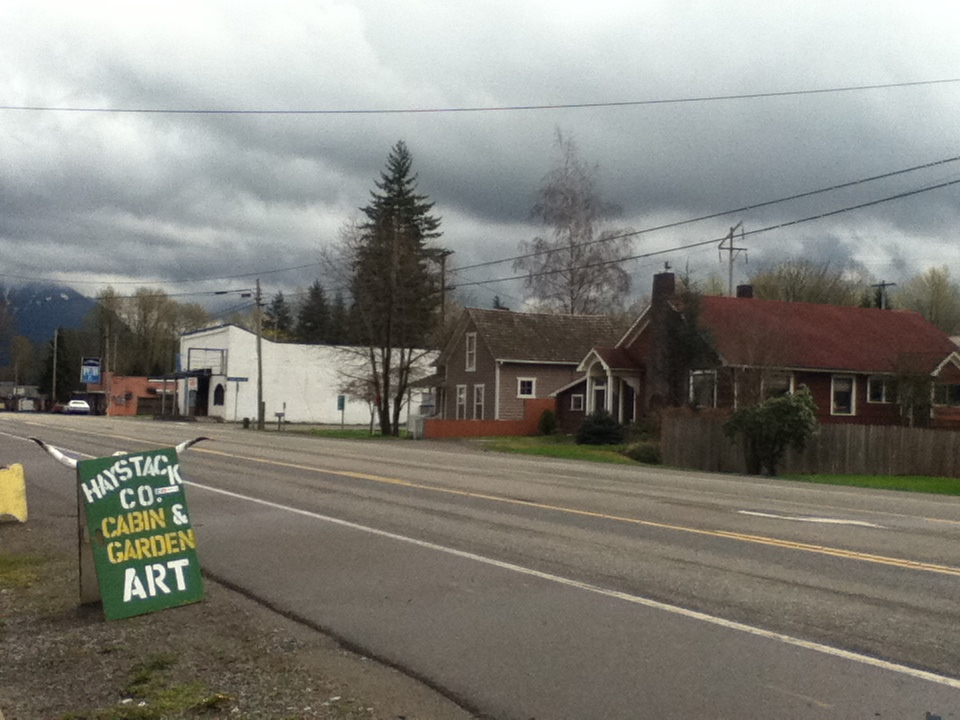
- Central Startup. The road in the image is U.S. Route 2.

- Location of Startup, Washington
- Coordinates: 47°51′57″N 121°44′41″W
- Country: United States
- State: Washington
- County: Snohomish

Area
  - Total: 4.0 sq mi (10.3 km^{2})
  - Land: 3.9 sq mi (10.1 km^{2})
  - Water: 0.077 sq mi (0.2 km^{2})
- Elevation: 148 ft (45 m)

Population (2020)
  - Total: 859
  - Density: 220/sq mi (85.0/km^{2})
- Time zone: UTC-8 (Pacific (PST))
  - Summer (DST): UTC-7 (PDT)
- ZIP Code: 98293
- Area code: 360, 564
- FIPS code: 53-67595
- GNIS feature ID: 1526502

Startup is a census-designated place (CDP) in Snohomish County, Washington, United States. The population was 859 according to the 2020 census.

== History ==
Startup was homesteaded by F.M. Sparling in the 1880s. He left the area in 1889 after getting married and sold his property to William Wait, who filed a plat for the town of Wallace on March 22, 1890. The town's name caused confusion with mail being mistakenly sent to Wallace, Idaho, and in 1901 the name was changed to Startup to honor George G. Startup, manager of the Wallace Lumber Company.

The Startup post office was established in 1900.

The settlement was mistakenly excluded from receiving mailed questionnaires for the 2000 census due to a post office error.

== Geography ==
According to the United States Census Bureau, Startup has a total area of 4.0 square miles (10.3 km^{2}), of which 3.9 square miles (10.1 km^{2}) is land and 0.1 square miles (0.2 km^{2}) (2.01%) water. It is located on U.S. Route 2 26.4 miles east of Everett.

=== Climate ===
The climate in this area has mild differences between highs and lows, and there is adequate rainfall year-round. According to the Köppen Climate Classification system, Startup has a marine west coast climate, abbreviated "Cfb" on climate maps.

Climate data for Startup, Washington, (1991–2020 normals, extremes 1924–present)
Month	Jan	Feb	Mar	Apr	May	Jun	Jul	Aug	Sep	Oct	Nov	Dec	Year
Record high °F (°C)	68 (20)	77 (25)	83 (28)	90 (32)	102 (39)	106 (41)	104 (40)	100 (38)	98 (37)	92 (33)	78 (26)	67 (19)	106 (41)
Mean maximum °F (°C)	59.3 (15.2)	62.2 (16.8)	68.9 (20.5)	77.2 (25.1)	83.7 (28.7)	86.2 (30.1)	91.7 (33.2)	90.8 (32.7)	86.7 (30.4)	76.4 (24.7)	64.0 (17.8)	57.5 (14.2)	94.6 (34.8)
Mean daily maximum °F (°C)	47.4 (8.6)	50.7 (10.4)	54.7 (12.6)	59.9 (15.5)	66.6 (19.2)	70.7 (21.5)	77.6 (25.3)	78.4 (25.8)	72.5 (22.5)	61.7 (16.5)	52.1 (11.2)	46.5 (8.1)	61.6 (16.4)
Daily mean °F (°C)	40.7 (4.8)	42.4 (5.8)	45.4 (7.4)	49.6 (9.8)	55.5 (13.1)	59.7 (15.4)	64.6 (18.1)	64.9 (18.3)	59.9 (15.5)	51.7 (10.9)	44.6 (7.0)	40.0 (4.4)	51.6 (10.9)
Mean daily minimum °F (°C)	34.0 (1.1)	34.0 (1.1)	36.1 (2.3)	39.3 (4.1)	44.4 (6.9)	48.8 (9.3)	51.6 (10.9)	51.4 (10.8)	47.3 (8.5)	41.6 (5.3)	37.1 (2.8)	33.6 (0.9)	41.6 (5.3)
Mean minimum °F (°C)	22.5 (−5.3)	24.1 (−4.4)	26.9 (−2.8)	31.1 (−0.5)	35.6 (2.0)	41.1 (5.1)	45.4 (7.4)	44.2 (6.8)	39.3 (4.1)	31.1 (−0.5)	25.3 (−3.7)	22.0 (−5.6)	17.5 (−8.1)
Record low °F (°C)	−8 (−22)	−4 (−20)	6 (−14)	17 (−8)	27 (−3)	31 (−1)	35 (2)	36 (2)	25 (−4)	19 (−7)	4 (−16)	3 (−16)	−8 (−22)
Average precipitation inches (mm)	8.94 (227)	5.92 (150)	6.77 (172)	5.87 (149)	4.95 (126)	3.84 (98)	1.48 (38)	1.70 (43)	3.49 (89)	7.13 (181)	9.82 (249)	8.41 (214)	68.32 (1,736)
Average snowfall inches (cm)	4.8 (12)	2.0 (5.1)	1.7 (4.3)	0.3 (0.76)	0.0 (0.0)	0.0 (0.0)	0.0 (0.0)	0.0 (0.0)	0.0 (0.0)	0.0 (0.0)	0.8 (2.0)	3.1 (7.9)	12.7 (32.06)
Average precipitation days (≥ 0.01 in)	19.8	16.9	20.0	18.4	15.3	14.1	6.8	6.5	10.9	17.2	20.3	19.7	185.9
Average snowy days (≥ 0.1 in)	3.1	0.8	0.7	0.3	0.0	0.0	0.0	0.0	0.0	0.0	0.4	1.5	6.8
Source 1: NOAA
Source 2: National Weather Service (snow/snow days 1924–2021)

== Demographics ==
Historical population
Census	Pop.	Note	%±
2000	817		—
2010	676		−17.3%
2020	859		27.1%
U.S. Decennial Census; 1970 1980 1990; 2000 2010

Startup first appeared as a census designated place in the 2000 U.S. census.

=== Racial and ethnic composition ===
Startup CDP, Washington – Racial and ethnic composition Note: the US Census treats Hispanic/Latino as an ethnic category. This table excludes Latinos from the racial categories and assigns them to a separate category. Hispanics/Latinos may be of any race.
Race / Ethnicity (NH = Non-Hispanic)	Pop 2000	Pop 2010	Pop 2020	% 2000	% 2010	% 2020
White alone (NH)	717	567	598	87.76%	83.88%	69.62%
Black or African American alone (NH)	3	2	0	0.37%	0.30%	0.00%
Native American or Alaska Native alone (NH)	22	15	9	2.69%	2.22%	1.05%
Asian alone (NH)	13	7	21	1.59%	1.04%	2.44%
Native Hawaiian or Pacific Islander alone (NH)	0	0	0	0.00%	0.00%	0.00%
Other race alone (NH)	5	6	11	0.61%	0.89%	1.28%
Mixed race or Multiracial (NH)	23	28	38	2.82%	4.14%	4.42%
Hispanic or Latino (any race)	34	51	182	4.16%	7.54%	21.19%
Total	817	676	859	100.00%	100.00%	100.00%

=== 2000 census ===
As of the census of 2000, there were 817 people, 332 households, and 227 families residing in the CDP. The population density was 209.2 people per square mile (80.7/km^{2}). There were 356 housing units at an average density of 91.2/sq mi (35.2/km^{2}). The racial makeup of the CDP was 89.84% White, 0.37% African American, 2.69% Native American, 1.59% Asian, 2.69% from other races, and 2.82% from two or more races. Hispanic or Latino of any race were 4.16% of the population.

There were 332 households, out of which 24.4% had children under the age of 18 living with them, 49.1% were married couples living together, 10.2% had a female householder with no husband present, and 31.6% were non-families. 25.9% of all households were made up of individuals, and 7.8% had someone living alone who was 65 years of age or older. The average household size was 2.46 and the average family size was 2.89.

In the CDP, the age distribution of the population shows 22.8% under the age of 18, 7.3% from 18 to 24, 29.1% from 25 to 44, 25.8% from 45 to 64, and 14.9% who were 65 years of age or older. The median age was 39 years. For every 100 females, there were 112.8 males. For every 100 females age 18 and over, there were 114.6 males.

The median income for a household in the CDP was $40,227, and the median income for a family was $45,000. Males had a median income of $42,250 versus $21,367 for females. The per capita income for the CDP was $18,049. About 9.9% of families and 13.6% of the population were below the poverty line, including 27.5% of those under age 18 and 15.8% of those age 65 or over.
