= South Cascade Lake =

Lake in Skagit County, Washington

- Location within Washington (state) Location within the United States
- Location: Skagit County, Washington
- Coordinates: 48°22′16″N 121°04′04″W
- Primary inflows: South Cascade Glacier
- Primary outflows: South Fork Cascade River
- Basin countries: United States
- Surface elevation: 5,297 ft (1,615 m)
- Islands: none

South Cascade Lake is a glacial lake in Washington. It is the source of the South Fork Cascade River. It is fed directly by the meltwater of the South Cascade Glacier.
