= Waterfalls of the North Fork Cascade River Valley =

There are multiple waterfalls in the basin of the North Fork Cascade River, a river in the North Cascades of Washington that drains to the Cascade River. Many of these are taller than the more famous waterfalls in North America, but do not receive much attention due to their remoteness.

== Main waterfalls ==
=== Boston Creek Falls ===
Boston Creek Falls
- Location: Skagit County, Washington, United States at 48.49298°N 121.07549°W
- Type: Tiered
- Total height: 1,627 feet (496 m)

Boston Creek Falls is a tall waterfall that drops 1,627 feet (496 m) off Forbidden Peak. With an average width of 25 feet (7.6 m) and a run of 2,800 feet (850 m), for the most part it is really more of a long cascade than a true waterfall. Its most prominent tier is a 500 feet (150 m) veil visible from the road, and a 60 feet (18 m) section of the falls is also in view from the road.

=== Torment Falls ===
Torment Falls
- Location: Skagit County, Washington, United States at 48.49719°N 121.10602°W
- Type: Tiered
- Total height: 1,627 feet (496 m)
- Number of drops: 4

Torment Falls, although similar in fashion to Boston Creek Falls, is steeper and often more impressive. The falls slide 1,440 feet (440 m) off Mount Torment in three or four tiers, in a run about 2,600 feet (790 m) long. Like Boston Creek Falls, the falls is mostly obscured due to its gently sloping nature, and is only partially visible from the road.

=== Roush Creek Falls ===
Roush Creek Falls
- Location: Skagit County, Washington, United States at 48.50389°N 121.13722°W
- Type: Cascade
- Total height: 1,600 to 2,400 feet (490 to 730 m)

Roush Creek Falls is a tall and powerful waterfall that cascades off the Eldorado Glacier. At about 2,000 feet (610 m) in height, though this measurement may vary as much as 400 feet (120 m), it is one of the tallest waterfalls in the state. The falls skip down the valley wall in several strands, before turning into a more vertical waterfall and pouring into the North Fork.

=== Johannesburg Falls ===
Johannesburg Falls
- Location: Skagit County, Washington, United States at 48.47655°N 121.090132°W
- Type: Cascade
- Total height: 2,465 to 751 feet (751 to 229 m)

Johannesburg Falls, at 48°28′36″N 121°05′29″W, is a tall, low-volume cascade that falls vertically about 2,465 feet (751 m) from several small unnamed glaciers on Johannesburg Mountain. Its most prominent feature is its final vertical drop of 800 feet (240 m). In overall height, it is the 19th tallest waterfall in the world.

== Other waterfalls ==
=== Known waterfalls ===
- Morning Star Falls, at 48°29′22″N 121°04′13″W, cascades 1,320 feet (400 m) off Sahale Mountain in several long, sliding waterfalls.
- Gilbert Falls, at 48°29′33″N 121°05′15″W, is a 300 feet (91 m) waterfall that is formed by a stream, Gilbert Creek, that cascades a total of 2,000 feet (610 m) from its source in the Boston Basin.

=== Obscure waterfalls ===
- Midas Creek Falls, at 48°29′13″N 121°04′11″W
- Hidden Lake Falls, at 48°29′53″N 121°09′55″W
- Cascade Basin Falls, at 48°28′21″N 121°5′5″W
