= Boston Peak =

Mountain in Washington (state), United States

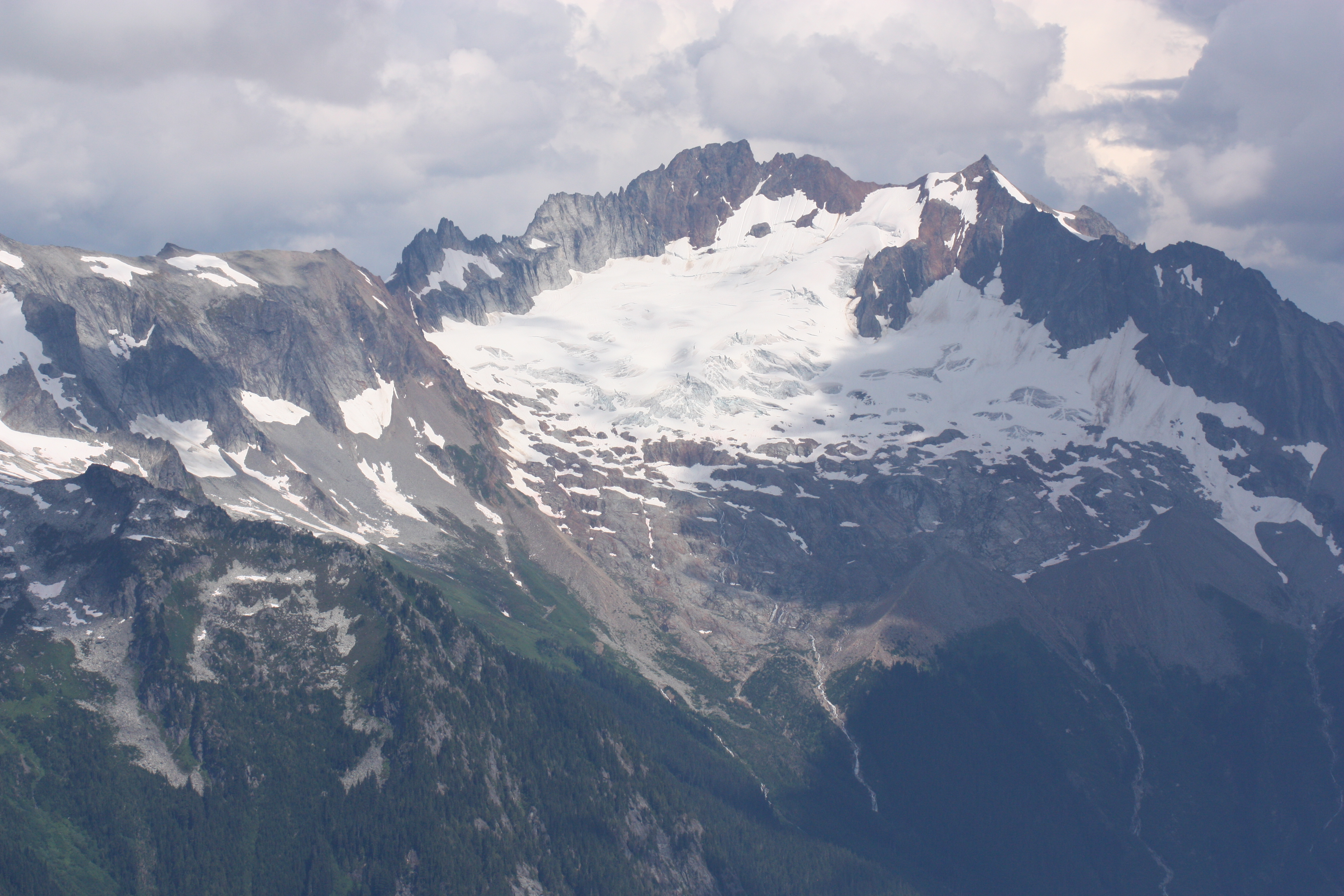
- Boston Peak and Quien Sabe Glacier

Highest point
- Elevation: 8,894 ft (2,711 m) NGVD 29
- Prominence: 854 ft (260 m)
- Coordinates: 48°29′44″N 121°02′10″W

Geography
- Location within Washington (state) Location within the United States
- Interactive map of Boston Peak
- Location: Skagit County, Washington, U.S.
- Parent range: North Cascades
- Topo map: USGS Cascade Pass

Climbing
- First ascent: 1938 by Calder Bressler, Ray Clough, Bill Cox, and Tom Myers
- Easiest route: Basic Snow/Ice Climb

Boston Peak is a tall peak in the North Cascades in the U.S. state of Washington and within North Cascades National Park. At 8,894 feet (2,711 m) in elevation it is the 26th highest peak in Washington. Its nearest higher neighbor is Buckner Mountain, 1.66 miles (2.67 km) to the east.

== Description ==
Boston Peak is located just north of the border between Chelan and Skagit counties. It is connected to Buckner Mountain, to the east by the sharp arête of Ripsaw Ridge, which follows the county line. Sahale Peak is located directly south of Boston Peak, connected by a short ridge. A longer ridge to the northwest connects Boston Peak with Forbidden Peak and Sharkfin Tower. The north slopes of Boston Peak and Ripsaw Ridge are covered by Boston Glacier, the largest glacier of the North Cascades. The west side of Boston Peak is covered by Quien Sabe Glacier. Davenport Glacier occupies the southeast side of Boston Peak. To the east of the high summits of Forbidden Peak, Boston Peak, and Sahale Mountain the land slopes down into the vast cirque of Boston Basin. Numerous headwater tributaries of the Cascade River flow down the slopes of Boston Basin. Cascade Pass, an important mountain pass of the North Cascades, is located about 2.2 mi (3.5 km) south of Boston Peak. To the south of the high peaks and ridges between Sahale Mountain, Boston Peak, Ripsaw Ridge, and Buckner Mountain is another vast cirque called Horseshoe Basin, from which some the headwater tributaries of the Stehekin River flow.

Boston Peak sits on the boundary between the watersheds of the Skagit River to the west, via the Cascade River and other tributaries, and the Columbia River to the east, via the Stehekin River and other tributaries.

== History ==
Boston Peak is named for Boston Mine, which operated on the southeast side of the peak in the late 19th century. The first mining claims of what would become the Cascade Mining District were made in 1889 by George Rowse and John Rouse, who named their claims "Boston" and "Chicago", respectively.

Boston Peak was first summited in 1938 by Calder Bressler, Ray Clough, Bill Cox, and Tom Myers. It is a difficult climb as the slope is steep and the rock very loose and friable.

== Gallery ==
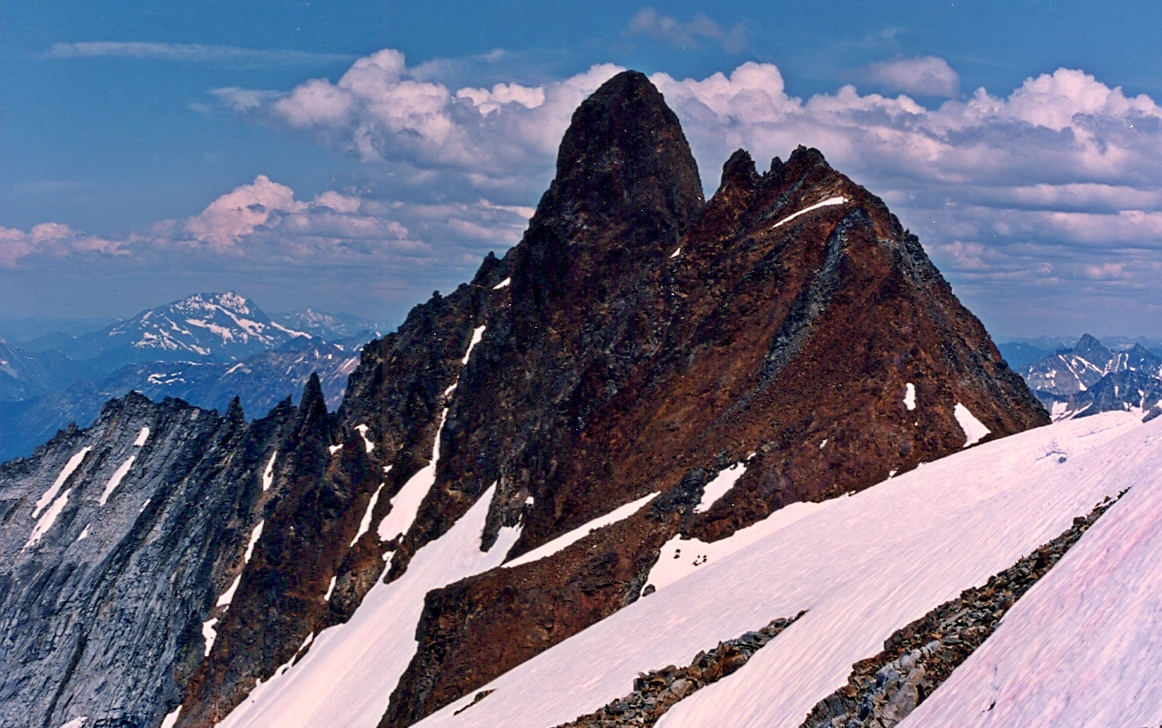
Boston Peak seen from Sahale Peak

== See also ==
- Media related to Boston Peak at Wikimedia Commons
- List of mountains of the United States
- List of mountains by elevation
