= Sahale =

Sahale or Sahalee may refer to:

- Sahale, a mythical spirit of the Puyallup people
- Sahale Mountain, a mountain in Washington state
- Sahale Glacier, a glacier on Sahale Mountain
- Sahalee Country Club, a golf resort in Sammamish, Washington
- Sahalee Players Championship, a tournament at the resort
