= Sharkfin Tower =

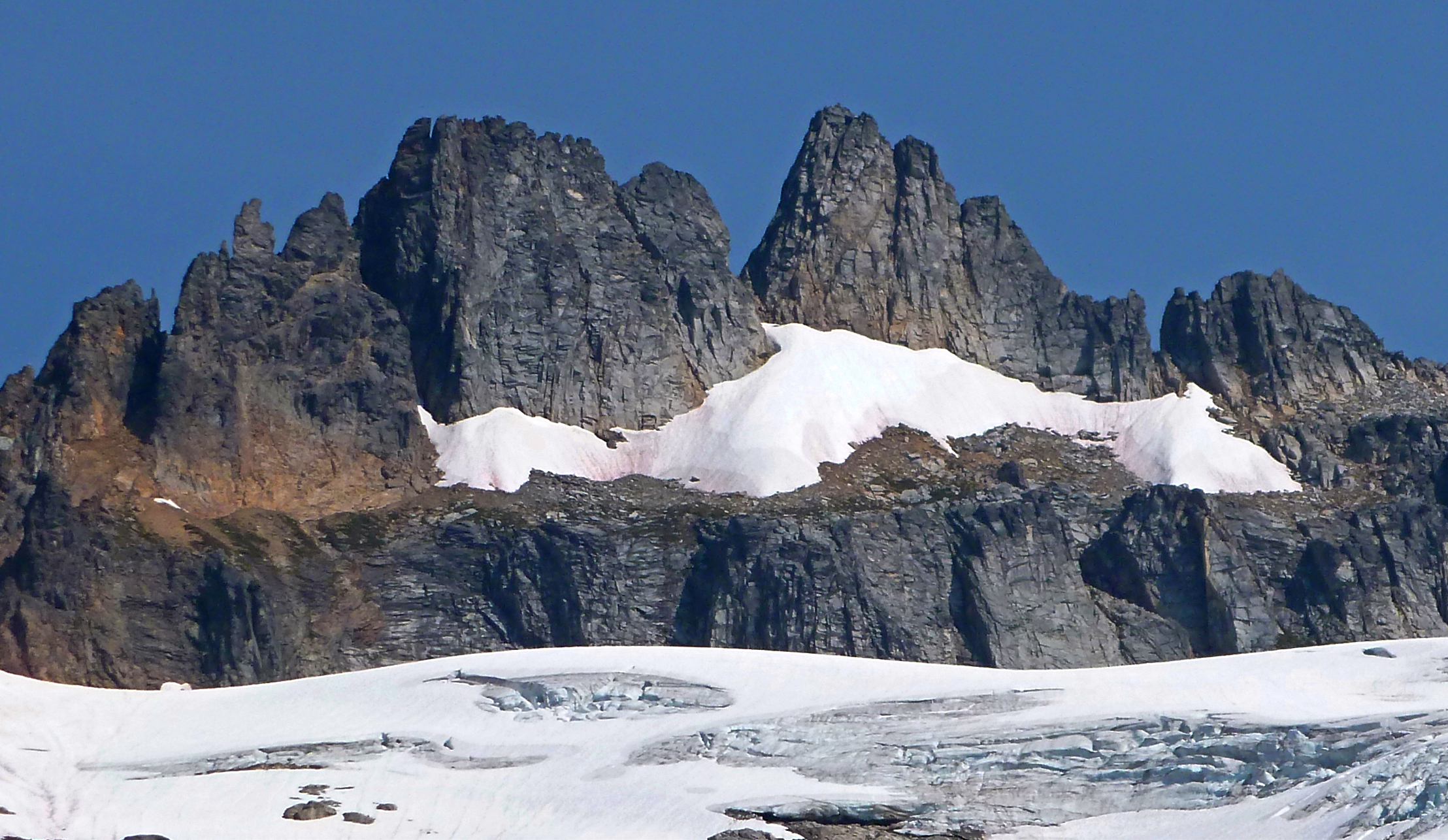
- Sharkfin Tower, south aspect

Highest point
- Elevation: 8,120 ft (2,470 m)
- Prominence: 80 ft (24 m)
- Parent peak: Boston Peak (8894 ft)
- Coordinates: 48°29′59″N 121°02′23″W

Geography
- Location within Washington (state) Location within the United States
- Interactive map of Sharkfin Tower
- Country: United States
- State: Washington
- County: Skagit
- Protected area: North Cascades National Park
- Parent range: North Cascades; Cascade Range
- Topo map: USGS Cascade Pass

Geology
- Rock type(s): Granite, Orthogneiss

Climbing
- First ascent: 1947 by Wesley Grande, Jay Todd, Joseph Vance
- Easiest route: SE Ridge Climbing class 5.0

Sharkfin Tower is an 8,120+ ft (2,470+ m) summit located in North Cascades National Park, in Skagit County of Washington state. It is set in the scenic North Cascades, which is a sub-range of the Cascade Range. The peak is situated midway on the high ridge which connects Forbidden Peak with Boston Peak. The Quien Sabe Glacier lies below its southern cliffs, and the immense Boston Glacier spreads out below the north aspect. Surface runoff from Sharkfin Tower drains into the Cascade River and Thunder Creek, both of which are tributaries of the Skagit River.

== Climbing ==
Many climbers consider Sharkfin Tower as having some of the best granite in the state of Washington. Two popular established rock climbing routes are the Southeast Ridge (YDS 5) first climbed in August 1947, and the Southeast Face (YDS 5.10), first climbed by Jim Nelson, Jim Martin, Kit Lewis, Bill Liddell, and Dave Bale in September 1990. The first ascent of the Northwest Face was made on July 1, 1968, by Mike Heath, Dan Raish, and Woody Savage. On July 10, 2005, tragedy befell a party of The Mountaineers attempting to climb the tower, resulting in three fatalities and one injured.

== Climate ==
Sharkfin Tower is located in the marine west coast climate zone of western North America. Weather fronts originating in the Pacific Ocean move northeast toward the Cascade Mountains. As fronts approach the North Cascades, they are forced upward by the peaks of the Cascade Range (orographic lift), causing them to drop their moisture in the form of rain or snowfall onto the Cascades. As a result, the west side of the North Cascades experiences high precipitation, especially during the winter months in the form of snowfall. Because of maritime influence, snow tends to be wet and heavy, resulting in avalanche danger. During winter months, weather is usually cloudy, but due to high pressure systems over the Pacific Ocean that intensify during summer months, there is often little or no cloud cover during the summer. Due to its temperate climate and proximity to the Pacific Ocean, areas west of the Cascade Crest very rarely experience temperatures below 0 °F (−18 °C) or above 80 °F (27 °C).

== Geology ==
The North Cascades features some of the most rugged topography in the Cascade Range with craggy peaks and ridges, and deep glacial valleys. Geological events occurring many years ago created the diverse topography and drastic elevation changes over the Cascade Range leading to various climate differences.

The history of the formation of the Cascade Mountains dates back millions of years ago to the late Eocene Epoch. With the North American Plate overriding the Pacific Plate, episodes of volcanic igneous activity persisted. In addition, small fragments of the oceanic and continental lithosphere called terranes created the North Cascades about 50 million years ago.

During the Pleistocene period dating back over two million years ago, glaciation advancing and retreating repeatedly scoured the landscape leaving deposits of rock debris. The U-shaped cross section of the river valleys is a result of recent glaciation. Uplift and faulting in combination with glaciation have been the dominant processes which have created the tall peaks and deep valleys of the North Cascades area.

== Gallery ==
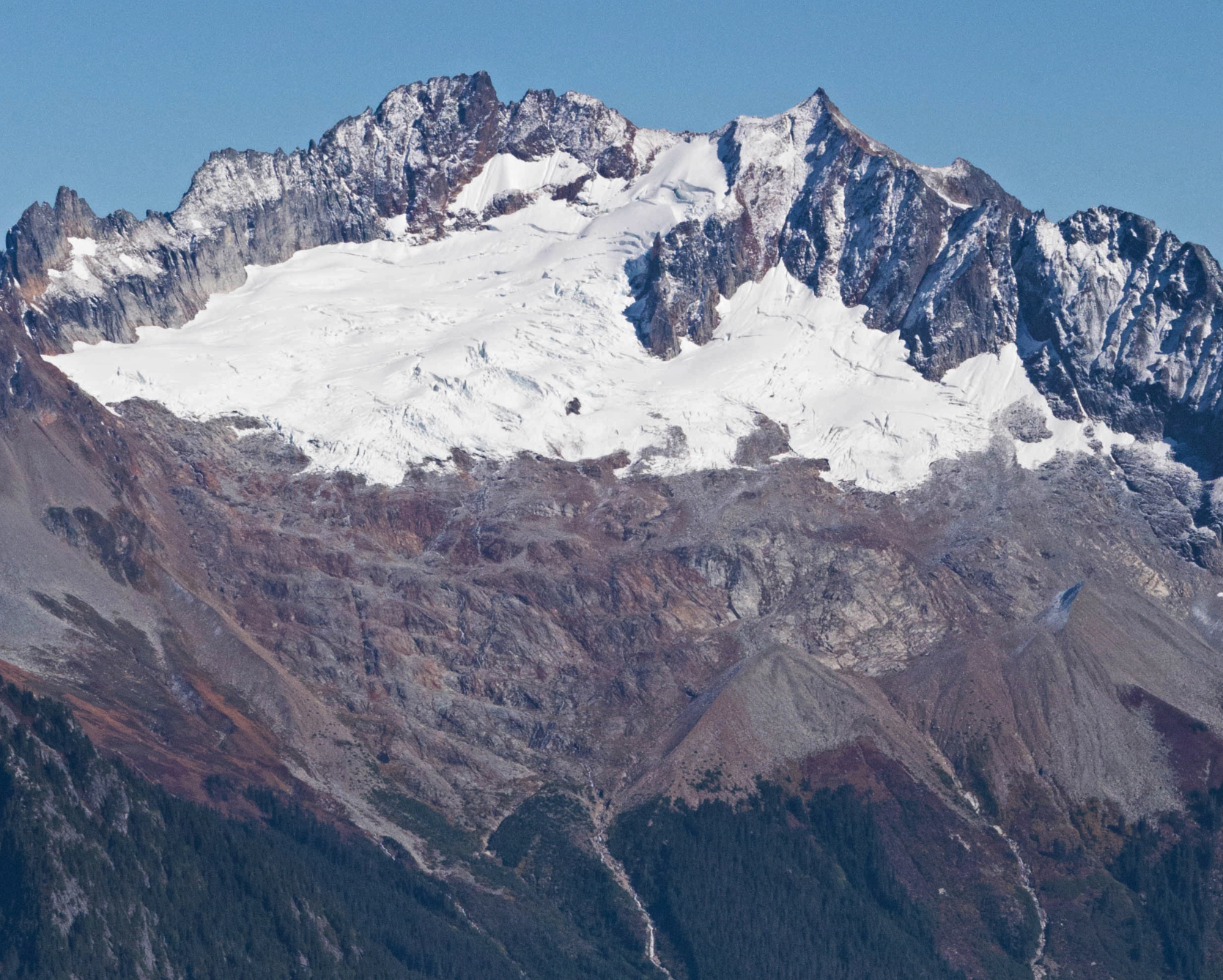
Sharkfin Tower, Boston Peak, and Sahale Peak surround the Quien Sabe Glacier in this view from Hidden Lake Peaks

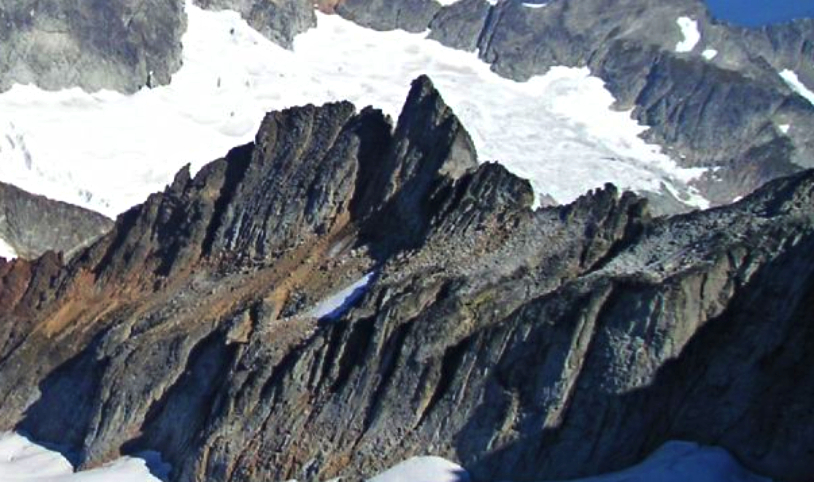
Sharkfin Tower from southeast

== See also ==
- Geography of Washington (state)
- Geology of the Pacific Northwest
- List of Highest Mountain Peaks in Washington
