= Thunder Glacier (Skagit County, Washington) =

Glacier in North Cascades National Park, Washington, USA

- Location within Washington (state)
- Type: Mountain glacier
- Location: North Cascades National Park, Skagit County, Washington, U.S.
- Coordinates: 48°30′15″N 120°59′24″W
- Length: .10 mi (0.16 km)
- Terminus: Icefall
- Status: Retreating

Thunder Glacier is located on the northeast slopes of Buckner Mountain, North Cascades National Park in the U.S. state of Washington. The glacier is approximately .10 mi (0.16 km) long and separated from the much larger Boston Glacier by an arete.

== See also ==
- List of glaciers in the United States
