= Buckner Mountain =

Mountain in Washington (state), United States

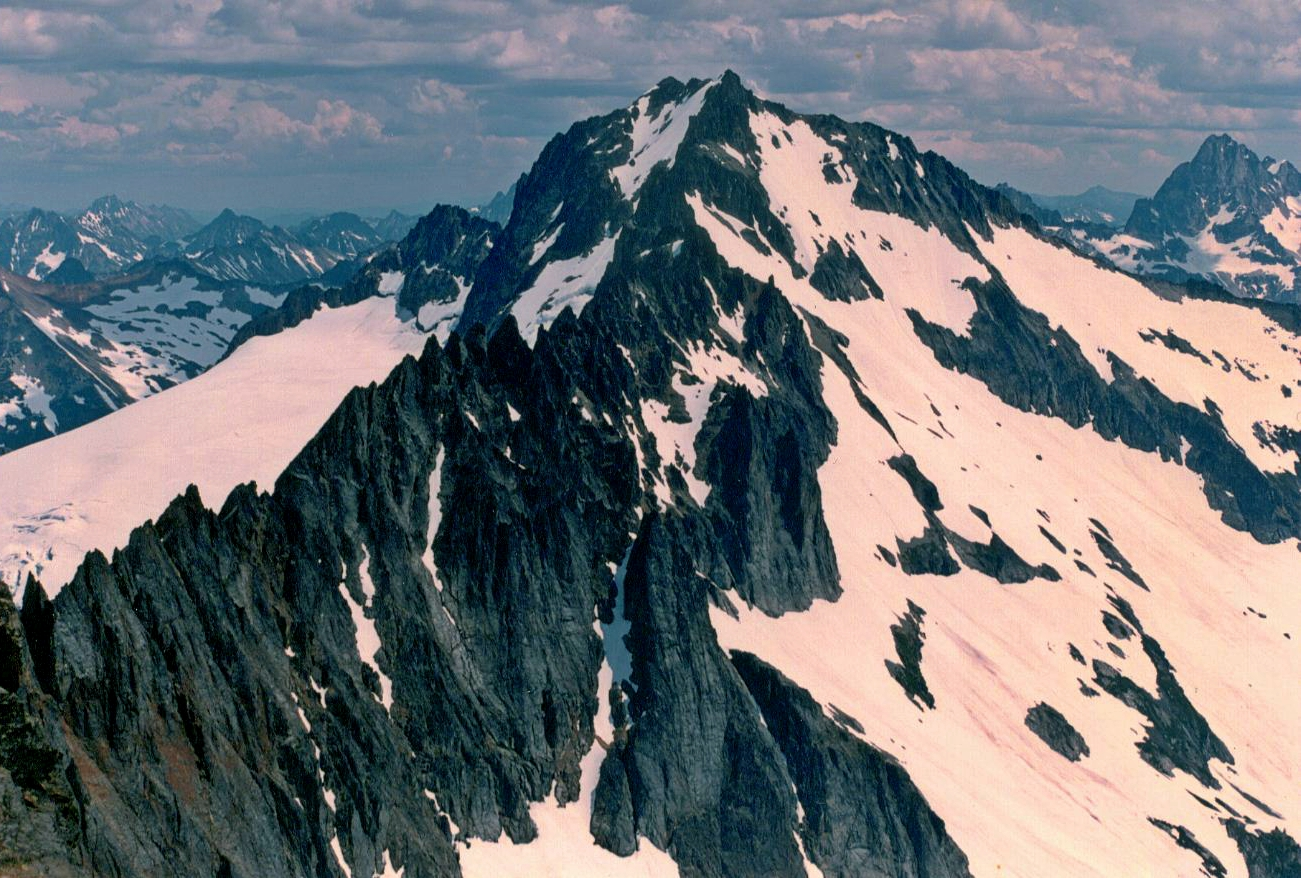
- Buckner Mountain from Sahale Mountain

Highest point
- Elevation: 9,114 ft (2,778 m)
- Prominence: 3,034 ft (925 m)
- Parent peak: Goode Mountain
- Coordinates: 48°29′42″N 120°59′52″W

Geography
- Location within Washington (state) Location within the United States
- Interactive map of
- Location: Chelan and Skagit Counties, Washington, United States
- Parent range: North Cascades
- Topo map: Goode Mountain

Climbing
- First ascent: Lewis Ryan, 1901-08-01

Buckner Mountain (sometimes called Mount Buckner) is a tall peak in the North Cascades of Washington state and in the Stephen Mather Wilderness of North Cascades National Park. At 9,114 feet (2,778 m) in elevation it is the highest in Skagit County and one of about ten of Washington's non-volcanic peaks above 9,000 feet high. It is ranked as the 14th highest peak in the state, and the third highest peak in North Cascades National Park.

== Description ==
The mountain has two summits of nearly the same elevation, separated by a ridgeline of a few hundred feet. Sources differ over the exact height of the southwestern summit. The current United States Geological Survey quadrangle shows the southwest summit to have an elevation between 9080 and 9119 feet. According to Peakbagger.com the southwestern peak is the higher one, at 9,114 ft (2,778 m), based on Edward Earl's pixel analysis of the height of the peak as derived from a digital photograph. The broader northeastern peak is agreed to be 9,112 ft (2,777 m). Noted climber Fred Beckey also claims in his Cascade Alpine Guide books that the Southwest summit is two feet higher but gives no source for the claim and this approximation is second-hand since Beckey has never summitted Buckner. Most mountain climbers visit the southwest peak since it is arrived at first via the standard Horseshoe Basin route.

Buckner Mountain, with a prominence of 3,034 feet (925 m), is the 51st most prominent peak in Washington state. The nearest higher peak is Goode Mountain, 4.13 miles (6.65 km) to the east.

Buckner Mountain is located on the border between Chelan and Skagit counties. It is connected to Horseshoe Peak, Boston Peak, and Sahale Mountain to the west by Ripsaw Ridge, which marks the county line for several miles. Cascade Pass is located a few miles south of Sahale Mountain. Boston Glacier, the largest glacier of the North Cascades, covers the entire region north of Ripsaw Ridge. South of Ripsaw Ridge the terrain slopes down into the vast Horseshoe Basin, from which some the headwater tributaries of the Stehekin River flow. Long high ridges extend from Buckner Mountain east to Park Creek Pass, and south to Booker Mountain and Park Creek Ridge. Other glaciers near Buckner Mountain include Thunder Glacier, to the north, and Buckner Glacier, to the south.

Buckner Mountain marks the boundary between the Skagit River watershed, to the west, and the Columbia River watershed, to the east, via the Columbia's tributaries: Chelan River, Chelan Lake and Stehekin River.

Buckner Mountain is named for Henry Freeland Buckner, who in the early 20th century managed a mining company which had claims in Horseshoe Basin, southwest of the peak.

== Climate ==
Buckner Mountain is located in the marine west coast climate zone of western North America. Most weather fronts originate in the Pacific Ocean, and travel northeast toward the Cascade Mountains. As fronts approach the North Cascades, they are forced upward by the peaks of the Cascade Range, causing them to drop their moisture in the form of rain or snowfall onto the Cascades (Orographic lift). As a result, the west side of the North Cascades experiences high precipitation, especially during the winter months in the form of snowfall. During winter months, weather is usually cloudy, but, due to high pressure systems over the Pacific Ocean that intensify during summer months, there is often little or no cloud cover during the summer. Because of maritime influence, snow tends to be wet and heavy, resulting in avalanche danger.

== Geology ==
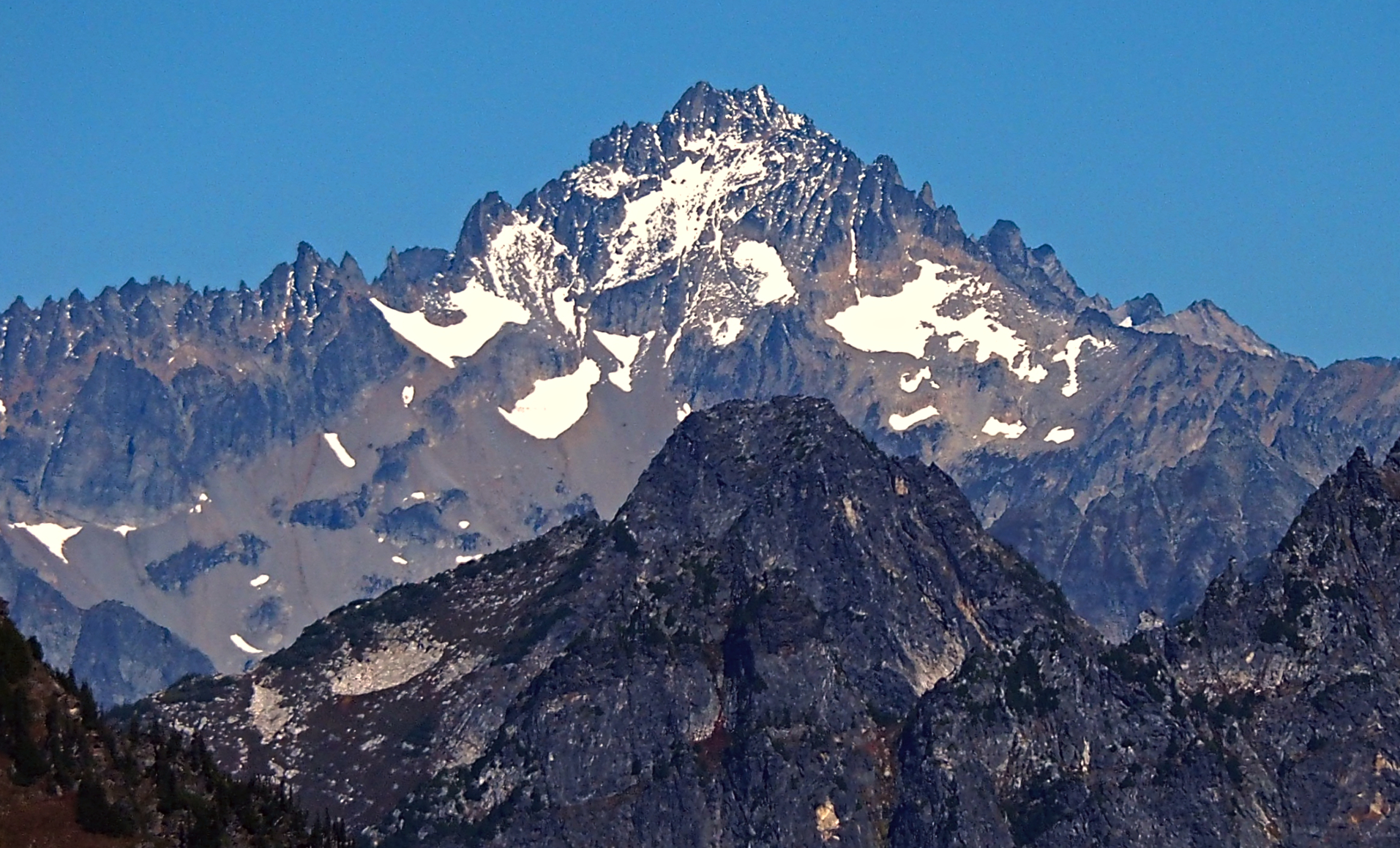
Buckner from southwest

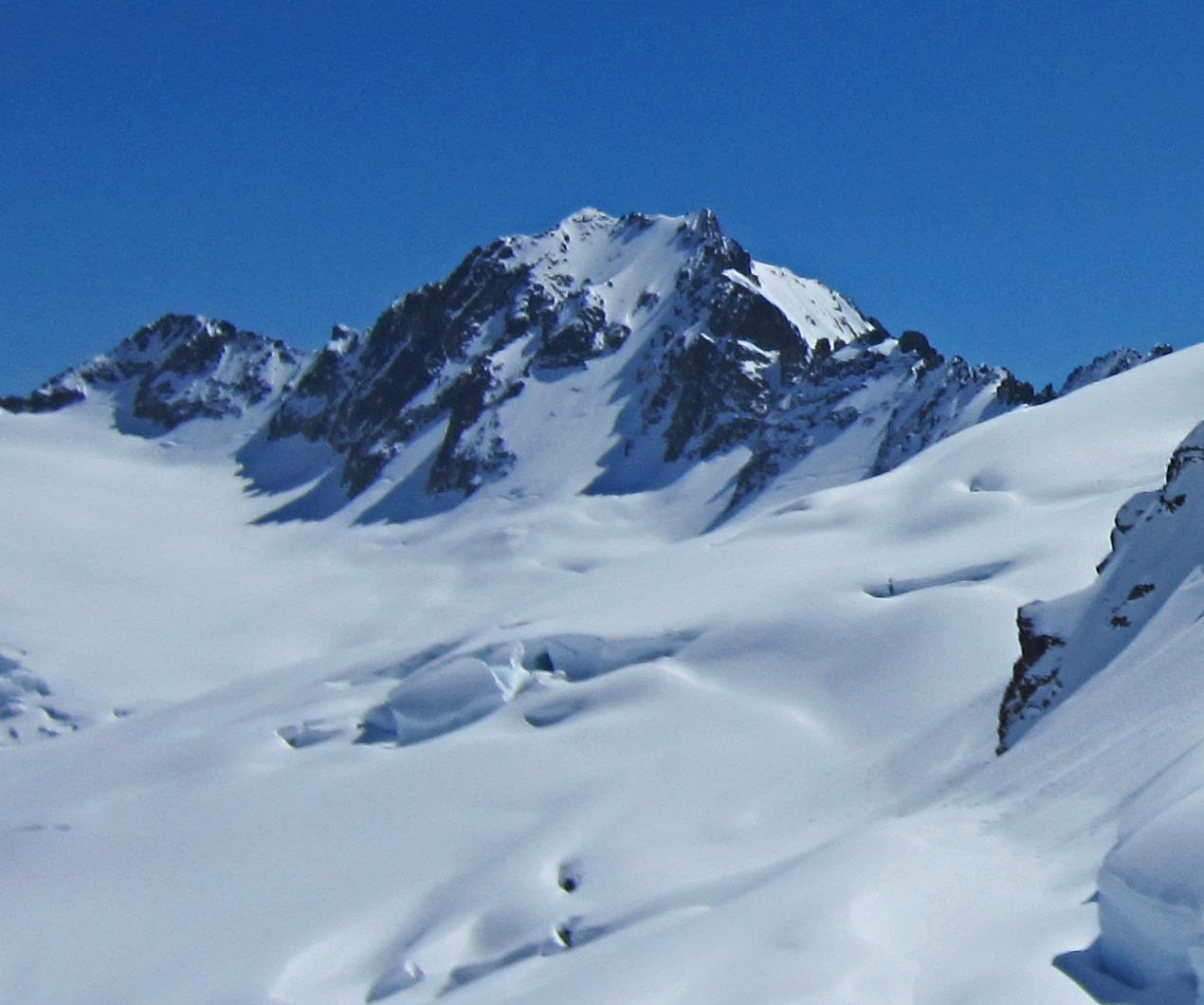
North face of Buckner from the Boston Glacier

The North Cascades features some of the most rugged topography in the Cascade Range with craggy peaks and ridges, deep glacial valleys, and granite spires. Geological events occurring many years ago created the diverse topography and drastic elevation changes over the Cascade Range leading to the various climate differences. These climate differences lead to vegetation variety defining the ecoregions in this area.

The history of the formation of the Cascade Mountains dates back millions of years ago to the late Eocene Epoch. With the North American Plate overriding the Pacific Plate, episodes of volcanic igneous activity persisted. In addition, small fragments of the oceanic and continental lithosphere called terranes created the North Cascades about 50 million years ago.

During the Pleistocene period dating back over two million years ago, glaciation advancing and retreating repeatedly scoured the landscape leaving deposits of rock debris. The U-shaped cross section of the river valleys is a result of recent glaciation. Uplift and faulting in combination with glaciation have been the dominant processes which have created the tall peaks and deep valleys of the North Cascades area.

== Recreation ==
Buckner Mountain is one of the more accessible high peaks of Washington, being located just east of Cascade Pass and a well-maintained trail. Boston Glacier, on the mountains northern face, has become one of the best known ice climbs in the North Cascades.

== See also ==
- List of mountains of the United States
- List of mountains by elevation
- Geology of the Pacific Northwest
