= Moraine Lake (Skagit County, Washington) =

- Location within Washington (state) Location within the United States
- Location: North Cascades National Park, Skagit County, Washington, United States
- Coordinates: 48°31′35″N 121°05′06″W
- Type: Alpine lake
- Primary outflows: Klawatti Creek
- Basin countries: United States
- Max. length: .75 mi (1.21 km)
- Max. width: .20 mi (0.32 km)
- Surface elevation: 4,524 ft (1,379 m)

Moraine Lake is located in North Cascades National Park, in the U. S. state of Washington. Moraine Lake is in a remote section of the park and well off any designated trails. During warmer months, melt from both the Inspiration and Forbidden Glaciers flow into Moraine Lake. Mount Torment is less than 1 mi (1.6 km) south of the lake.
