= Mount Torment =

Mountain in Washington (state), United States

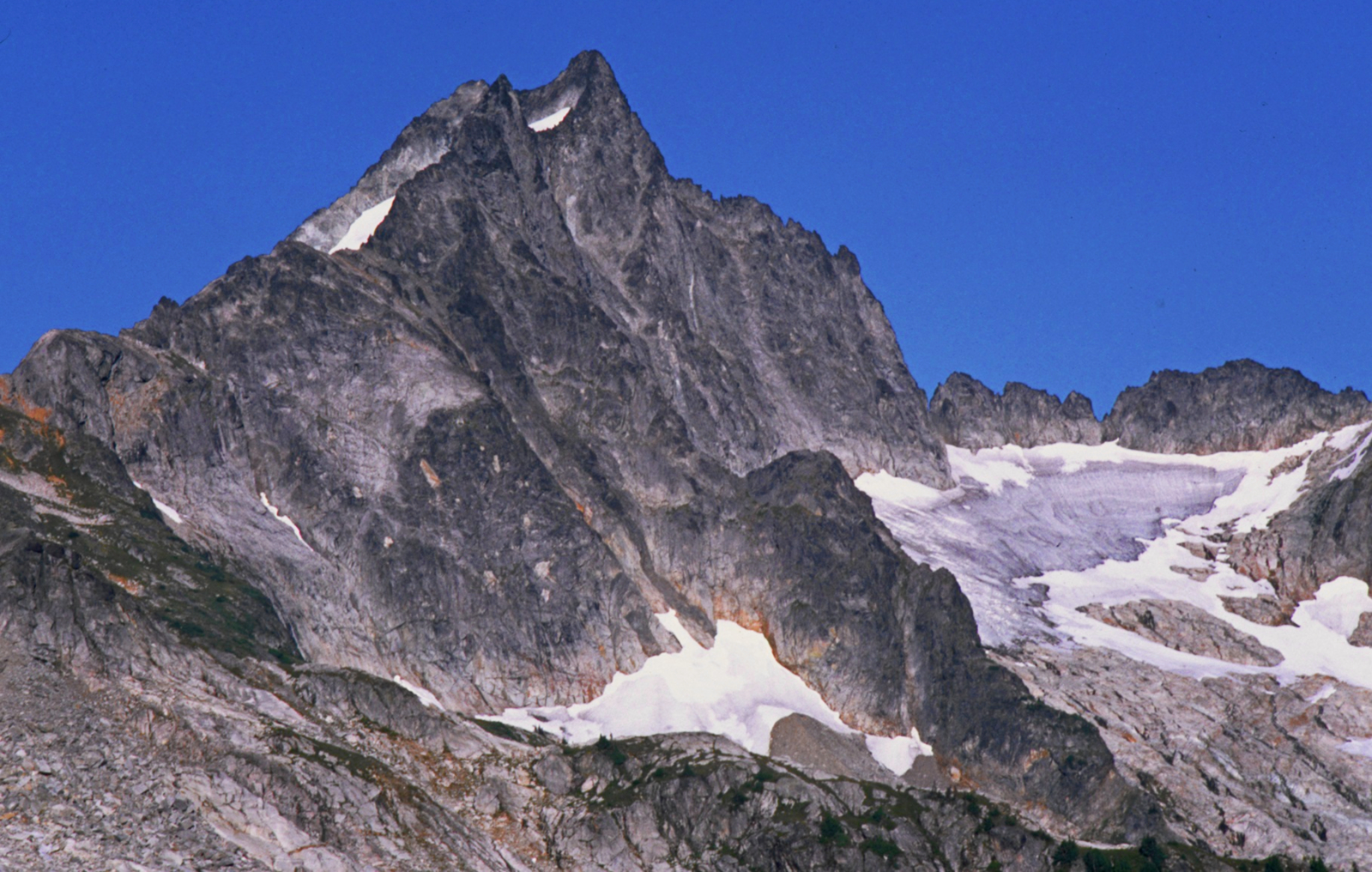

Highest point
- Elevation: 8,120+ ft (2,470+ m)
- Prominence: 200 ft (60 m)
- Coordinates: 48°30′45″N 121°04′36″W

Geography
- Location: Skagit County, Washington, U.S.
- Parent range: North Cascades

Geology
- Volcanic arc: Cascade Volcanic Arc

Climbing
- First ascent: 1946 by Jack Schwabland and Herb Staley

Mount Torment is a 8,120+ -foot (2,470+ m) high peak in the North Cascades of Washington in the United States. It is located approximately 65 miles (105 km) northeast of the city of Everett. First ascended on August 23, 1946, its name originates from the first ascent party, because of "the torture of a hot day with only one orange for quenching thirst." Since then, Mount Torment has gained popularity because of the Torment-Forbidden Traverse to neighboring Forbidden Peak, an exposed alpine route.

The North Fork Cascade River rises in a basin below Mount Torment and flows several miles west to the Cascade River. Numerous waterfalls are found in this valley.

== Climate ==
Mount Torment is located in the marine west coast climate zone of western North America. Most weather fronts originate in the Pacific Ocean, and travel northeast toward the Cascade Mountains. As fronts approach the North Cascades, they are forced upward by the peaks of the Cascade Range, causing them to drop their moisture in the form of rain or snowfall onto the Cascades (Orographic lift). As a result, the west side of the North Cascades experiences high precipitation, especially during the winter months in the form of snowfall. During winter months, weather is usually cloudy, but, due to high pressure systems over the Pacific Ocean that intensify during summer months, there is often little or no cloud cover during the summer. Because of maritime influence, snow tends to be wet and heavy, resulting in high avalanche danger.

== Geology ==
The North Cascades features some of the most rugged topography in the Cascade Range with craggy peaks, spires, ridges, and deep glacial valleys. Geological events occurring many years ago created the diverse topography and drastic elevation changes over the Cascade Range leading to various climate differences.

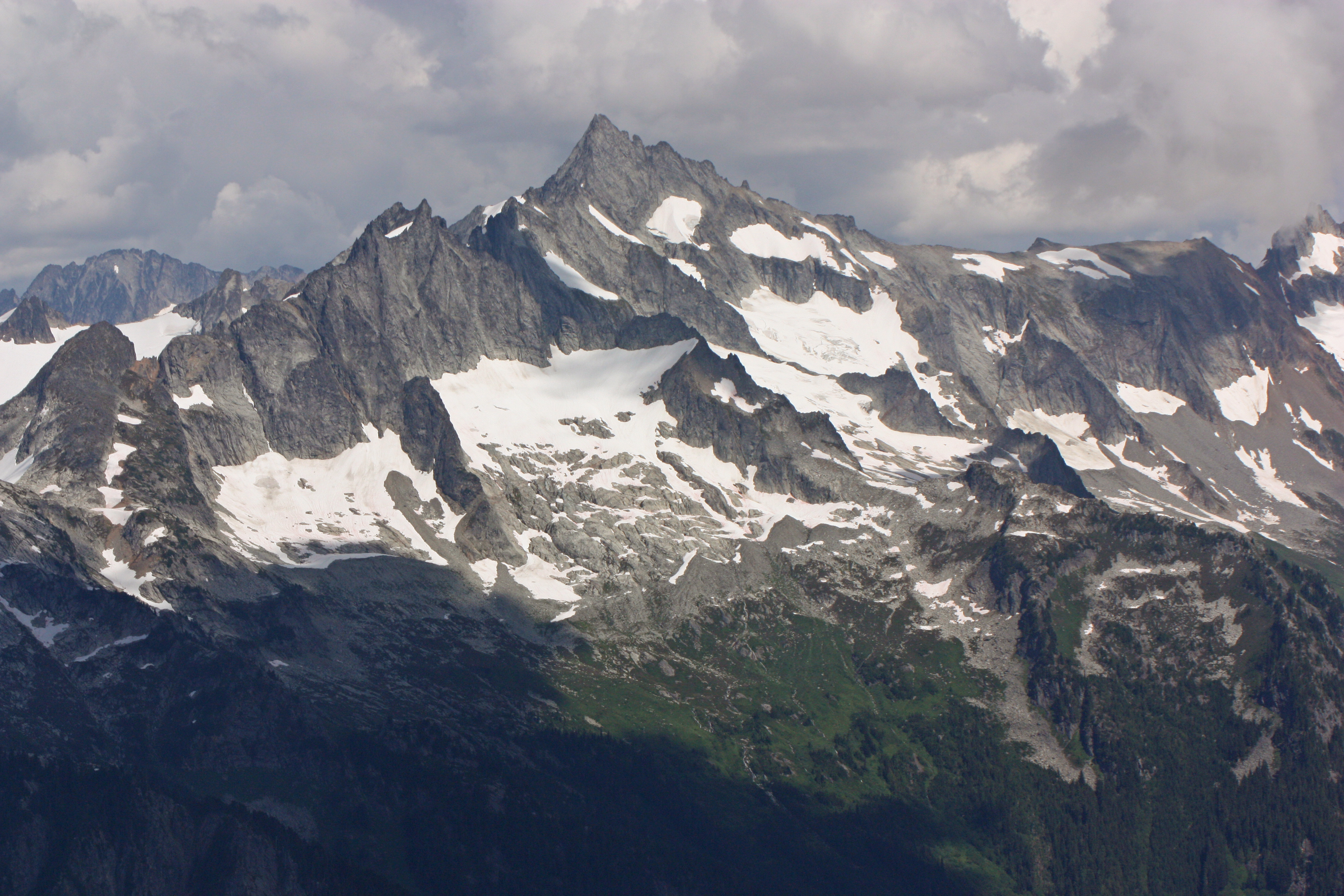
Mount Torment below left of Forbidden Peak (center)

The history of the formation of the Cascade Mountains dates back millions of years ago to the late Eocene Epoch. With the North American Plate overriding the Pacific Plate, episodes of volcanic igneous activity persisted. In addition, small fragments of the oceanic and continental lithosphere called terranes created the North Cascades about 50 million years ago.

During the Pleistocene period dating back over two million years ago, glaciation advancing and retreating repeatedly scoured the landscape leaving deposits of rock debris. The U-shaped cross section of the river valleys is a result of recent glaciation. Uplift and faulting in combination with glaciation have been the dominant processes which have created the tall peaks and deep valleys of the North Cascades area.
