= Buckner Glacier =

Glacier in the state of Washington

- Location within Washington (state)
- Type: Mountain glacier
- Location: North Cascades National Park, Chelan County, Washington, U.S.
- Coordinates: 48°29′11″N 120°59′37″W
- Length: .70 mi (1.13 km)
- Terminus: Icefall
- Status: Retreating

Buckner Glacier is located on the south slope of Buckner Mountain, North Cascades National Park in the U.S. state of Washington. The glacier is approximately .70 mi (1.13 km) in length and is split in two mid-distance along its course. The upper section descends from 8,400 to 7,500 ft (2,600 to 2,300 m) and the lower section lies from approximately 6,800 to 6,300 ft (2,100 to 1,900 m). Buckner Mountain is situated between the glacier and the much larger Boston Glacier to the north.

== See also ==
- List of glaciers in the United States
