= Sahale Glacier =

Glacier in Washington state, United States

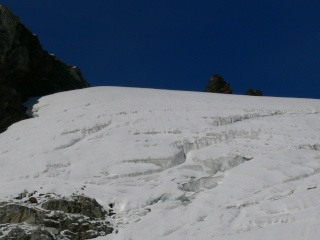
- Sahale Glacier

- Location within Washington (state)
- Type: Mountain glacier
- Location: North Cascades National Park, Chelan County, Washington, U.S.
- Coordinates: 48°29′15″N 121°02′30″W
- Length: .25 mi (0.40 km)
- Terminus: Icefall/barren rock
- Status: Retreating

Sahale Glacier is located on the south slope of Sahale Mountain, North Cascades National Park in the U.S. state of Washington. It is approximately 0.25 mi (0.40 km) in length and descends from 8,200 to 7,800 ft (2,500 to 2,400 m). Sahale is separated by ridges from Davenport Glacier to the northeast and the Quien Sabe Glacier to the north.

== See also ==
- List of glaciers in the United States
