= Booker Mountain =

Located in the North Cascades of Washington

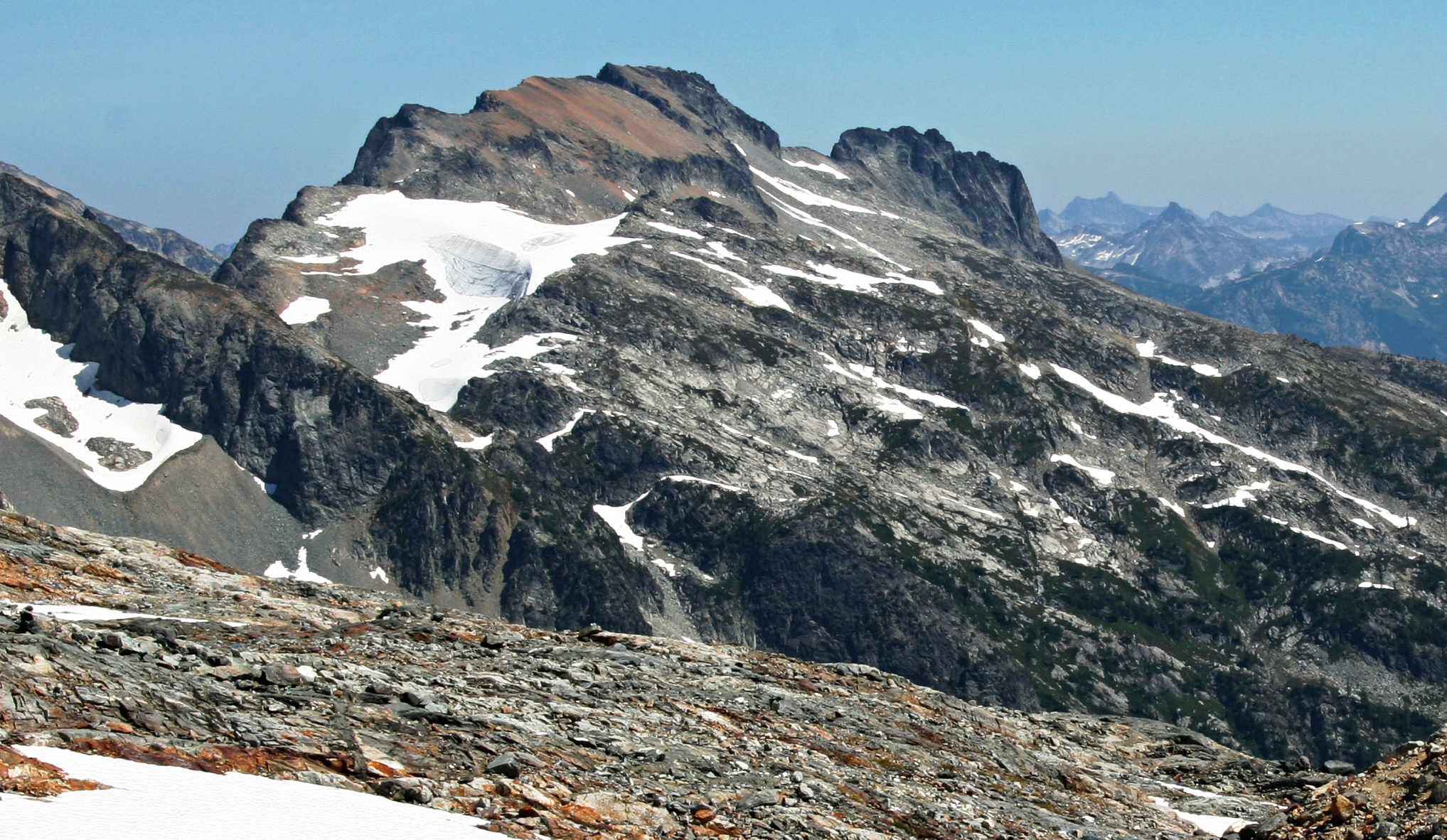
- Booker Mountain seen from Sahale Mountain

Highest point
- Elevation: 8,284 ft (2,525 m)
- Parent peak: Buckner Mountain (9,114 ft)
- Coordinates: 48°28′31″N 120°58′45″W

Naming
- Etymology: Booker T. Washington

Geography
- Location within Washington (state) Location within the United States
- Interactive map of Booker Mountain
- Location: North Cascades National Park; Chelan, Washington, United States
- Parent range: North Cascades
- Topo map: USGS Goode Mountain

Geology
- Rock age: Eocene to Late Cretaceous
- Rock type: Granodioritic Orthogneiss

Climbing
- First ascent: August 22, 1964 by Dan Davis and John Holland

Booker Mountain, also known as Mount Booker, with an elevation of 8,284 feet (2,525 m), is located in the North Cascades of Washington, about 1.5 miles SE of Mount Buckner, between Park Creek and Stehekin River. It is named in honor of Booker T. Washington.

== History ==
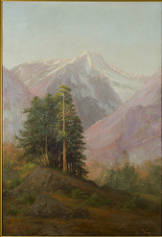
Hill's oil on canvas painting of Mount Booker

Landscape painter Abby Williams Hill, of Tacoma, Washington, was contracted by the Great Northern Railway Company to paint pictures of the North Cascades, and she first painted Mount Booker in 1903. At the time of Hill's painting, the mountain had not yet been named; newspaper critics called it "No-name mountain."

Abby Hill wrote to the National Geological Survey to determine the mountain's name, and the agency offered her the opportunity to name it. She had previously traveled to visit Booker T. Washington (d. 1915), and she attended his lectures in Tuskegee, Alabama, in the fall of 1901. She was also very moved by her experiences with Jim Crow laws in the South, as well as by Washington's lectures. As a result, Abby Hill named the mountain in honor of Booker T. Washington.

== Climbing history ==
The first ascent of the Northeast Face of Mount Booker was completed by Dan Davis and John Holland on August 22, 1964.

== Geology ==
The North Cascades features some of the most rugged topography in the Cascade Range with craggy peaks, ridges, and deep glacial valleys. Geological events occurring many years ago created the diverse topography and drastic elevation changes over the Cascade Range leading to the various climate differences. These climate differences lead to vegetation variety defining the ecoregions in this area.

The history of the formation of the Cascade Mountains dates back millions of years ago to the late Eocene Epoch. With the North American Plate overriding the Pacific Plate, episodes of volcanic igneous activity persisted. In addition, small fragments of the oceanic and continental lithosphere called terranes created the North Cascades about 50 million years ago.

During the Pleistocene period dating back over two million years ago, glaciation advancing and retreating repeatedly scoured the landscape leaving deposits of rock debris. The U-shaped cross section of the river valleys is a result of recent glaciation. Uplift and faulting in combination with glaciation have been the dominant processes which have created the tall peaks and deep valleys of the North Cascades area.

== Gallery ==
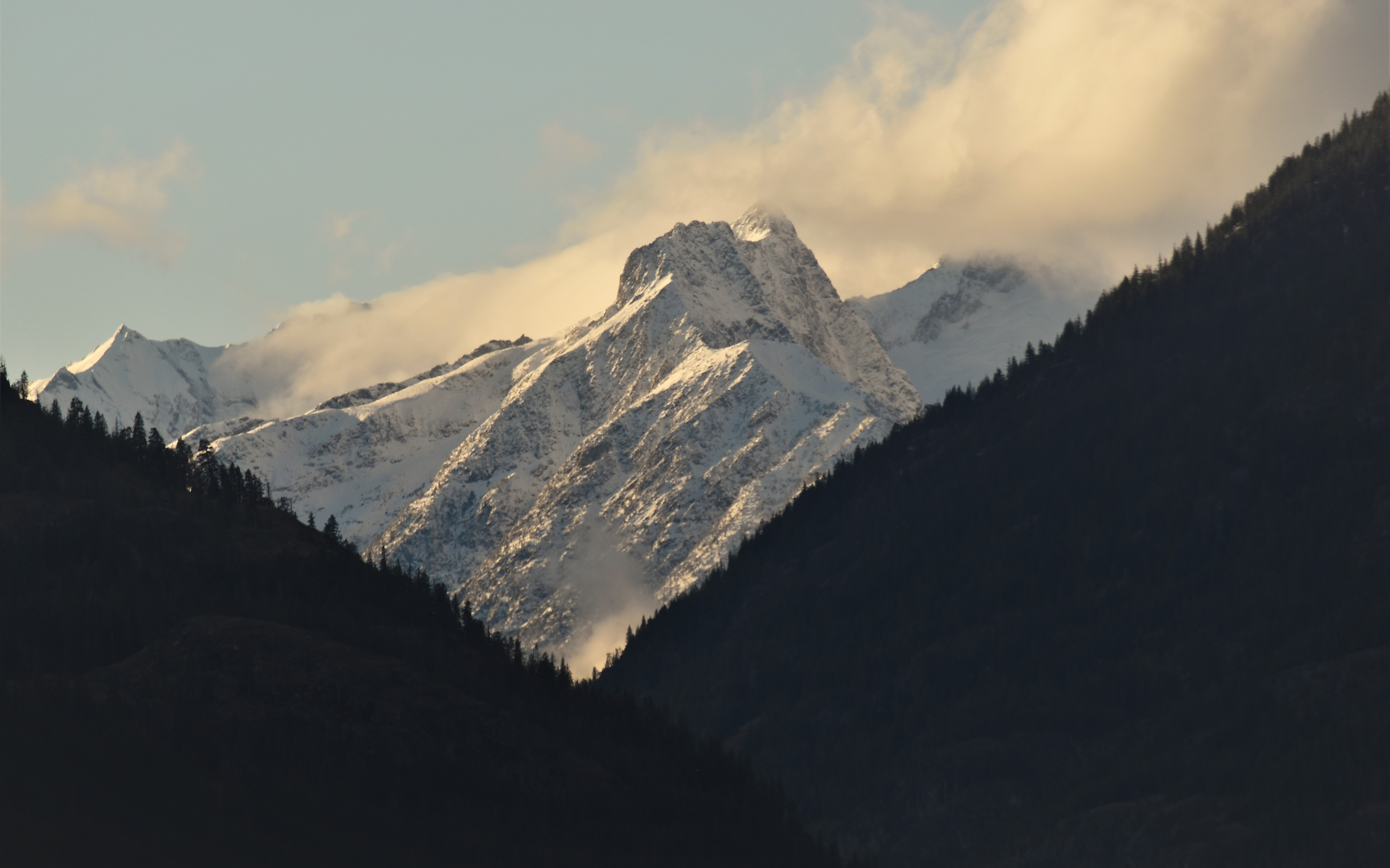
Southeast aspect

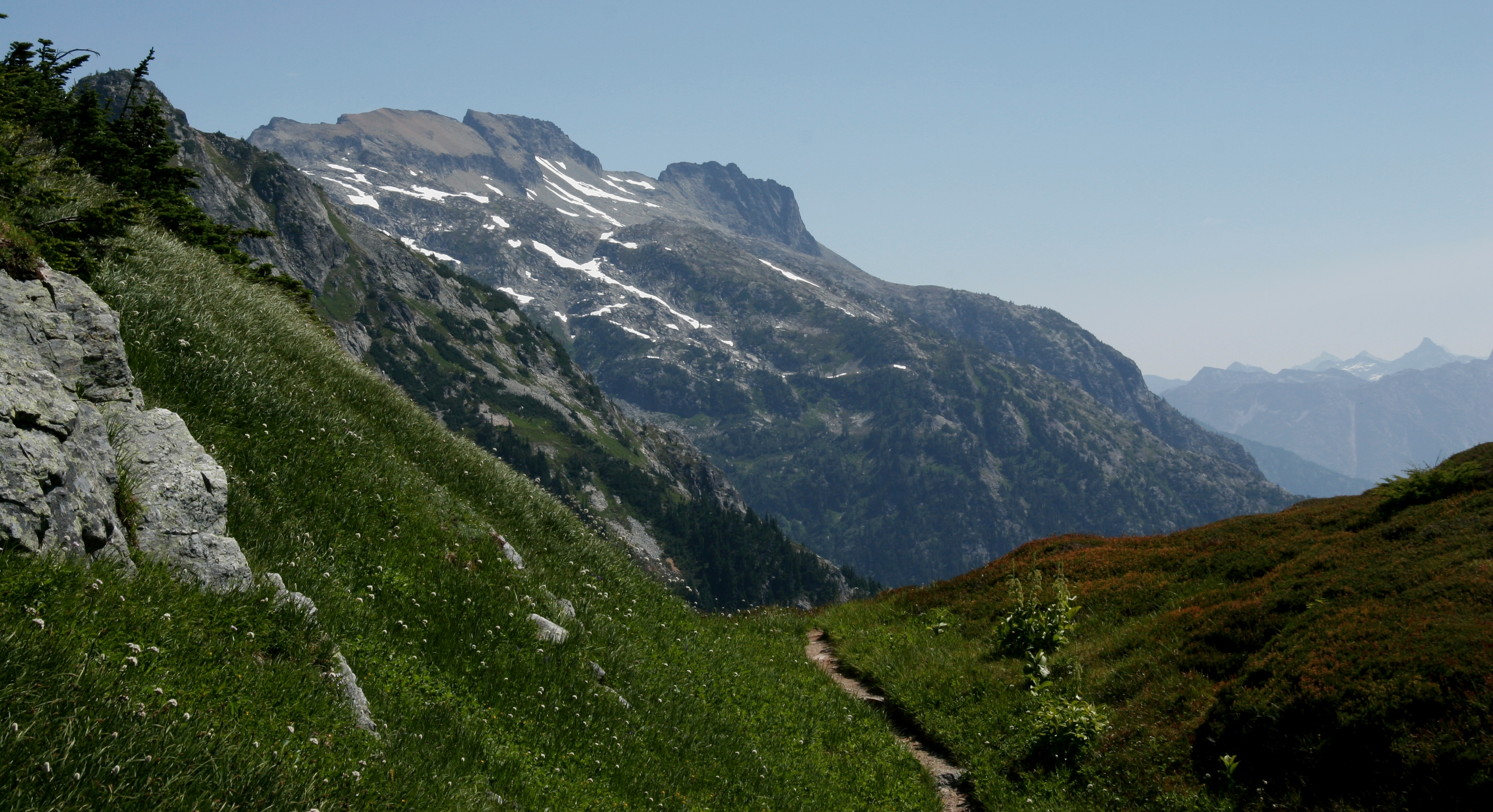
West aspect of Booker Mountain, from Sahale Arm

== See also ==
- List of things named after Booker T. Washington
- Geography of the North Cascades
