= Davenport Glacier =

Glacier in the state of Washington

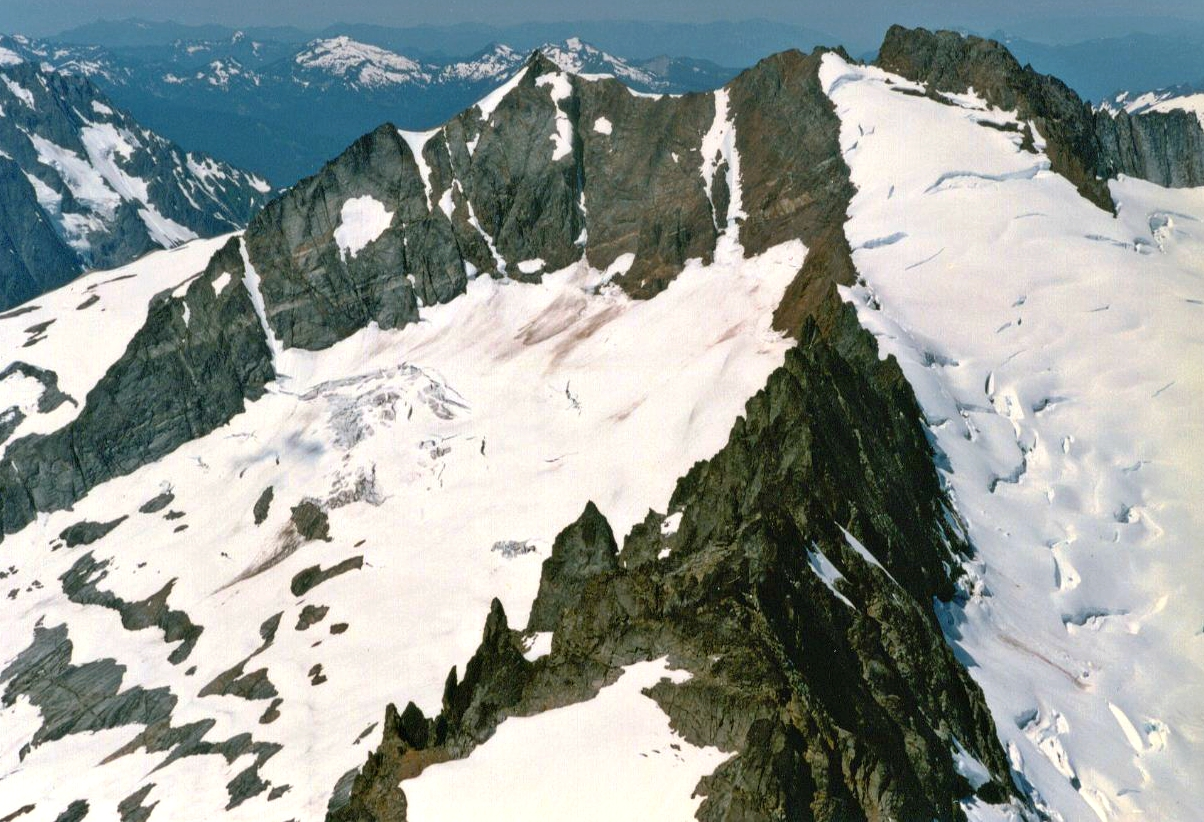
- Davenport Glacier - arete - Boston Glacier

- Location within Washington (state)
- Type: Mountain glacier
- Location: North Cascades National Park, Chelan County, Washington, U.S.
- Coordinates: 48°29′34″N 121°01′46″W
- Length: .20 mi (0.32 km)
- Terminus: Icefall/barren rock
- Status: Retreating

Davenport Glacier is located in a cirque to the southeast of Boston Peak, North Cascades National Park in the U.S. state of Washington. The glacier is approximately .20 mi (0.32 km) in length resting at between 8,000 and 7,500 ft (2,400 and 2,300 m). The glacier is also northeast of Sahale Mountain and separated from the much larger Boston Glacier to the north by an arête called "Ripsaw Ridge".

== See also ==
- List of glaciers in the United States
