= David A. Lind =

- Born: September 12, 1918
- Died: March 6, 2015 (aged 96)

Academic background
- Education: University of Washington; Caltech

Academic work
- Discipline: physics
- Institutions: University of Wisconsin–Madison; University of Colorado Boulder

David Arthur Lind (September 12, 1918 – March 6, 2015) was an American physics professor, Guggenheim Fellow, mountain climber, and skier. He was part of a five-man team that made the first ascent of Forbidden Peak in the North Cascades in 1940.

Lind was born in Seattle, Washington. He received a B.S. in physics in 1940 from the University of Washington and a Ph.D. in physics from Caltech in 1948. During World War II, he was on leave of absence from Caltech to conduct torpedo research at the University of Washington. From 1948 to 1950, he was a research fellow at Caltech, where he learned cyclotron design and instrumentation from working with Jesse DuMond. For the academic year 1950–1951, Lind was a Guggenheim Fellow studying at the Nobel Institute of Physics in Stockholm and at ETH Zurich. He was from 1951 to 1956 an assistant professor at the University of Wisconsin–Madison. At the University of Colorado Boulder, he was an associate professor from 1956 to 1959, and a full professor from 1959 to 1983, when he retired as professor emeritus. He also chair of the physics department from 1974 to 1978.

Lind and Jack J. Kraushaar were the faculty leaders for developing and operating the University of Colorado Cyclotron. They were the principal investigators of an AEC contract for designing and constructing a 52-inch cyclotron with azimuthally varying magnetic field and capable of accelerating protons to 30 MeV.

The Colorado University Nuclear Physics program, with Lind and Kraushaar as co-directors, conducted pioneering research for over a quarter of a century and provided training and opportunities for a generation of physics students. Albert A. Bartlett was a member of Lind and Kraushaar's group.

Lind, with co-author Scott P. Sanders, wrote the book The Physics of Skiing (1996). He taught a course on the physics of snow and avalanche phenomena as part of his work at the CU Arctic and Alpine Institute. Lind developed avalanche rescue beacons while working as a consultant for the National Ski Patrol Association. He was a member of the Colorado Mountain Club, Sierra Club, The Mountaineers, and the American Alpine Club. Lind taught technical climbing and was a lifelong skier, having started at 11 and continuing into his 80s.

David Lind married Mary Frances Dungan on October 22, 1945, in Seattle. He died on March 6, 2015, in Boulder, Colorado. Upon his death he had two sons, two daughters, seven grandchildren, and one great-grandchild.
