= Forbidden Glacier =

Glacier in the state of Washington

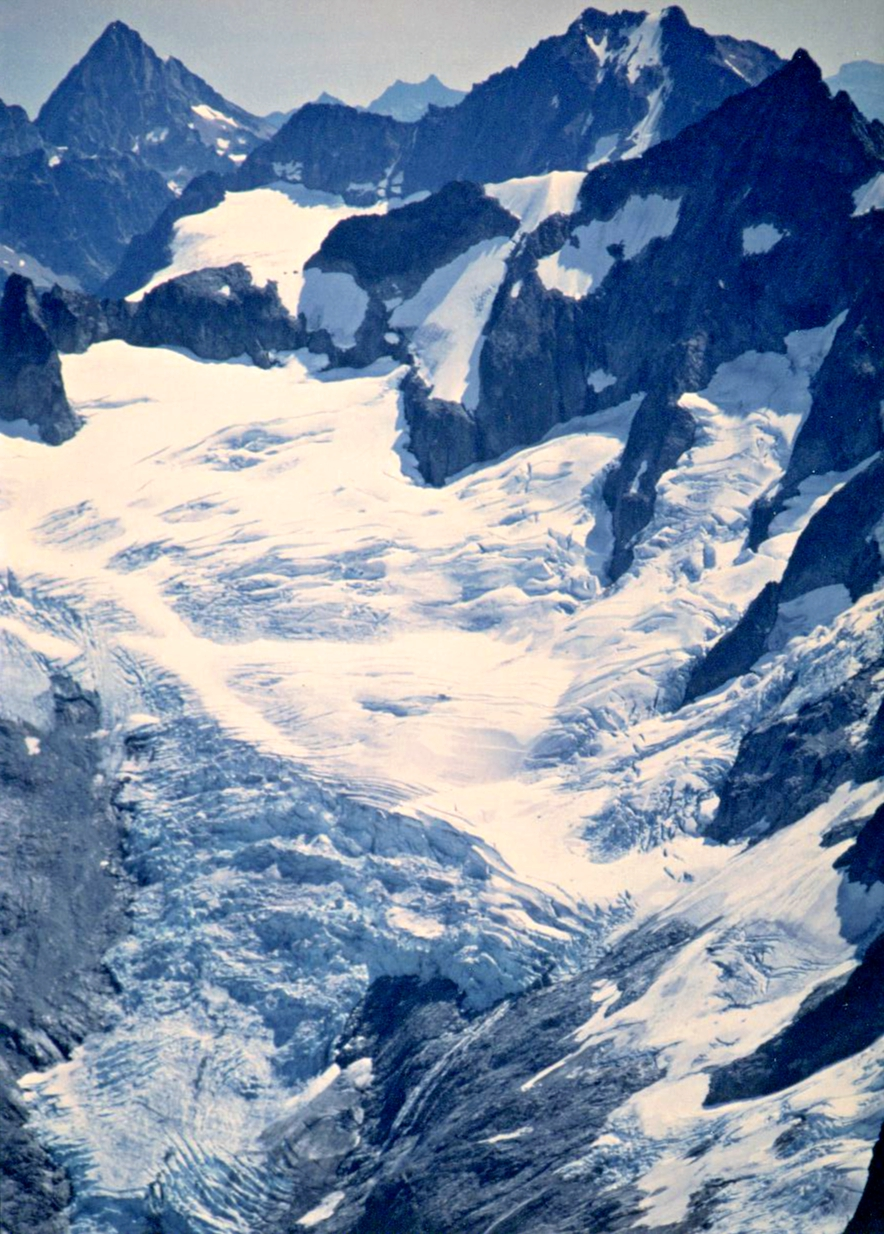
- Forbidden Glacier

- Location within Washington (state)
- Type: Mountain glacier
- Location: North Cascades National Park, Skagit County, Washington, U.S.
- Coordinates: 48°31′03″N 121°03′44″W
- Length: .75 mi (1.21 km)
- Terminus: Icefall/barren rock
- Status: Retreating

Forbidden Glacier is on the north slopes of Forbidden Peak, North Cascades National Park in the U.S. state of Washington. The glacier is approximately .75 mi (1.21 km) in length, 1 mi (1.6 km) in width at its terminus and descends from 8,000 to 5,600 ft (2,400 to 1,700 m). The glacier is separated by an arête from Boston Glacier to the east and south. Meltwaters from Forbidden Glacier flow into Moraine Lake.

== See also ==
- List of glaciers in the United States
