= Abby Williams Hill =

American painter

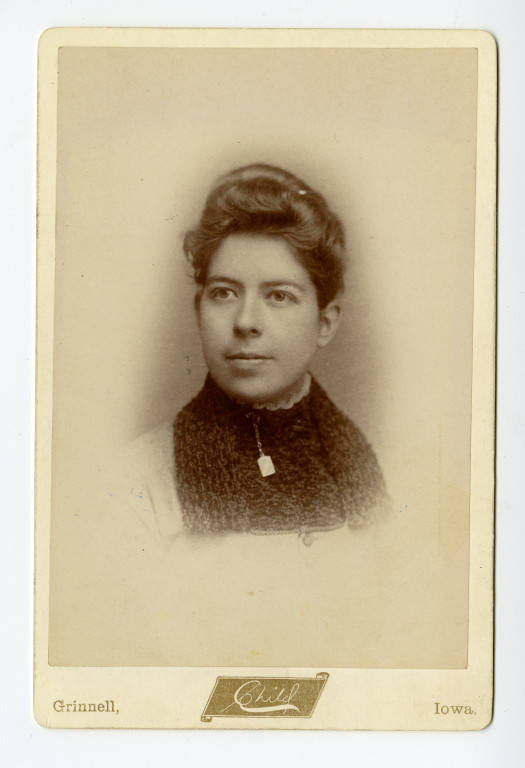
- Portrait of Abby Williams Hill, taken in Grinnell, Iowa.
- Born: Abby Rhoda Williams; September 25, 1861; Grinnell, Iowa
- Died: May 14, 1943 (aged 81); San Diego, California
- Education: Art Student's League
- Known for: Landscape painting
- Spouse: Frank R. Hill
- Children: 4

Abby Williams Hill (1861–1943) was an American plein-air painter most known for her landscapes of the American West. Hill also advocated for children's rights, attended the 1905 Congress of Mothers in Washington, D.C., and founded the Washington (state) Parent-Teacher Association.

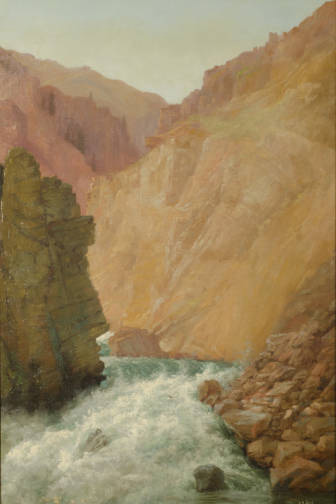
Hills' painting of a gorge in Chelan County, Washington that was one of 24 of her paintings exhibited at the 1904 World's Fair.

== Early life and education ==
Hill was born Abby Rhoda Williams on September 25, 1861, the daughter of Henry W. and Hanett Hubbard Williams, in Grinnell, Iowa. Early on, she received encouragement in art from her parents and later her stepmother, Mary, and instruction as a child from her aunt, Ruth Hubbard. Later, she studied with Henry F. Spread at the School of the AIC (1883). Following a teaching assignment at a girls seminary at Berthier-en-haut, Quebec (1884–1886) and a return to Grinnell, she studied art at the Art Students' League (ASL) in New York where she came to study with William Merritt Chase. In 1888, she married Frank R. Hill, a homeopathic doctor, and the couple settled in Tacoma, Washington and nearby Vashon Island, until 1910. They had one son and adopted three daughters.

== Career ==
In the early 1900s, the Great Northern Railway and the Northern Pacific Railway commissioned Hill to paint landscapes of the northwestern United States to promote tourism. The commission required that Hill produce 22 paintings in just 18 weeks, and that she produce them en plein air. Accompanied by her four children, Abby Hill took prolonged camping trips for the purpose of painting scenery in places such as Yosemite National Park and Yellowstone National Park. Her works were exhibited at the 1904 World's Fair in St. Louis and the 1905 Lewis and Clark Centennial Exposition in Portland. Over the course of her career, Hill achieved her goal of painting in every national park in the Western United States.

Her husband became incapacitated by psychotic depression in 1911, so the family moved to the small isolated community of Laguna Beach, California, for the benefit of the mild, sunny climate. Abby Hill was one of several early-20th-century American artists who built studios in Laguna Beach and transformed it into an artist community. She became a founding member of the Laguna Beach Art Association. She and her husband lived there until 1922, eventually returning to Tacoma, Washington and California while he was a patient at various California hospitals. Upon his release in 1924, she purchased an automobile and, for the next seven years, she and the family wintered in Tucson, AZ, travelling during the summers to the Deep South and to many locations in the West.

Following the death of her husband in 1938, Abby Hill became bedridden. She died in San Diego, California on May 14, 1943.

== Collection ==
A permanent collection of her works and papers is held by the University of Puget Sound.

== See also ==
- Booker Mountain
