= Roush Creek Falls =

Waterfall in Washington (state), United States

- Location within Washington (state)
- Location: North Cascades National Park, United States
- Coordinates: 48.50389°N 121.13722°W
- Type: Segmented steep cascade
- Total height: 2,000 feet (610 m)
- Watercourse: Roush Creek
- Average flow rate: 50 cu ft/s (1.4 m^{3}/s)

Roush Creek Falls is a steep cascade in North Cascades National Park, Washington, U.S. Glacial melt waters from Eldorado Glacier flow south creating Roush Creek. Not far from its origination, Roush Creek flows over Roush Creek Falls, which at 2,000 ft (610 m), is one of the tallest waterfalls in Washington.
