= Eldorado Glacier =

Glacier in the state of Washington

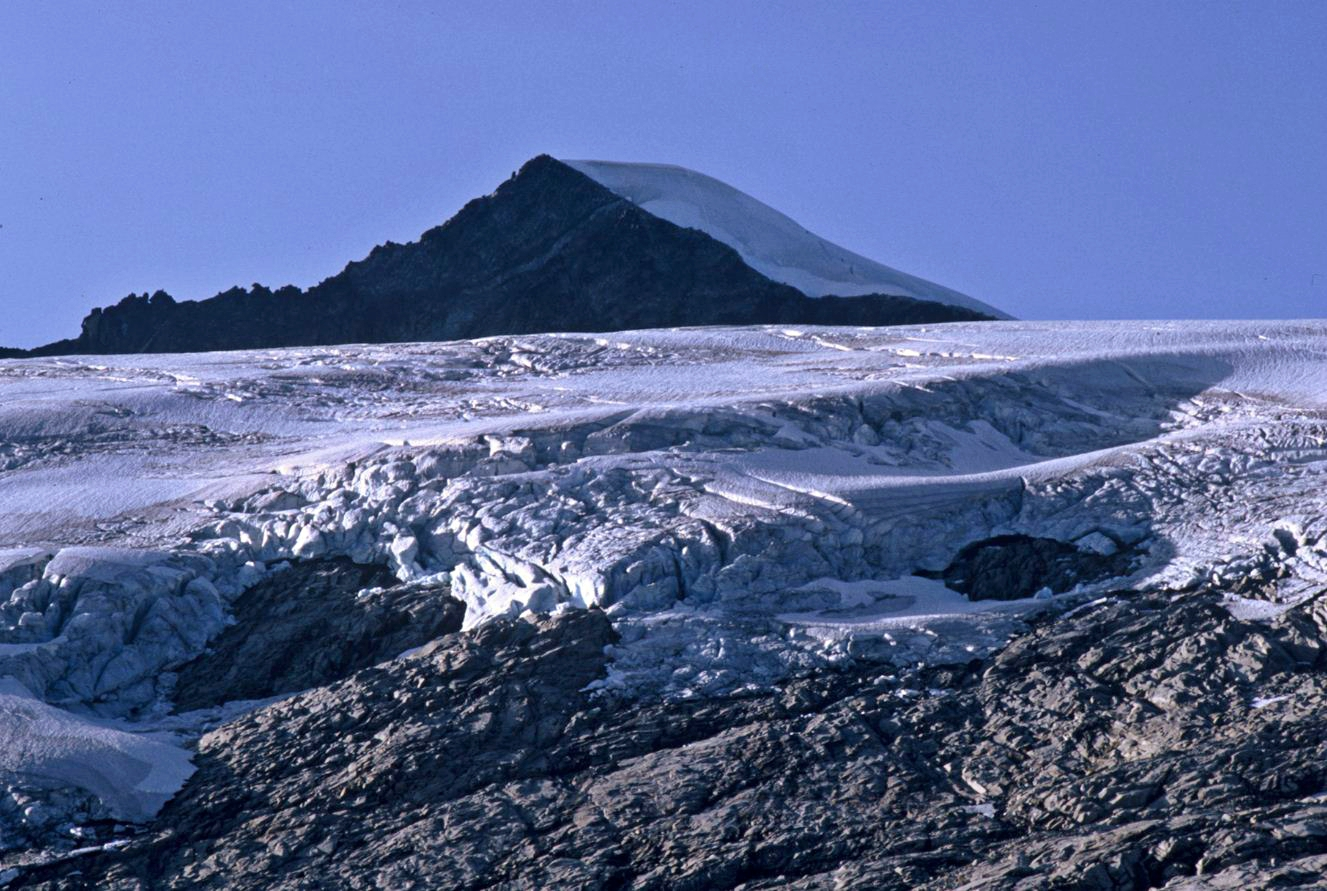
- Eldorado Peak and Eldorado Glacier

- Location within Washington (state)
- Type: Mountain glacier
- Location: North Cascades National Park, Skagit County, Washington, U.S.
- Coordinates: 48°31′34″N 121°07′32″W
- Length: .85 mi (1.37 km)
- Terminus: Icefall/barren rock
- Status: Retreating

Eldorado Glacier is on the south slopes of Eldorado Peak, North Cascades National Park, in the U.S. state of Washington. The glacier is approximately .85 mi (1.37 km) in length, 1.2 mi (1.9 km) in width at its terminus and descends from 8,400 to 7,000 ft (2,600 to 2,100 m). Eldorado Glacier is connected to Inspiration Glacier on its upper slopes. Glacial melt waters from Eldorado Glacier flow south over Roush Creek Falls, which at 2,000 ft (610 m), is one of the tallest waterfalls in Washington.

== See also ==
- Media related to Eldorado Glacier at Wikimedia Commons
- List of glaciers in the United States
