= Sahale Peak =

Mountain in Washington (state), United States

Sahale Mountain
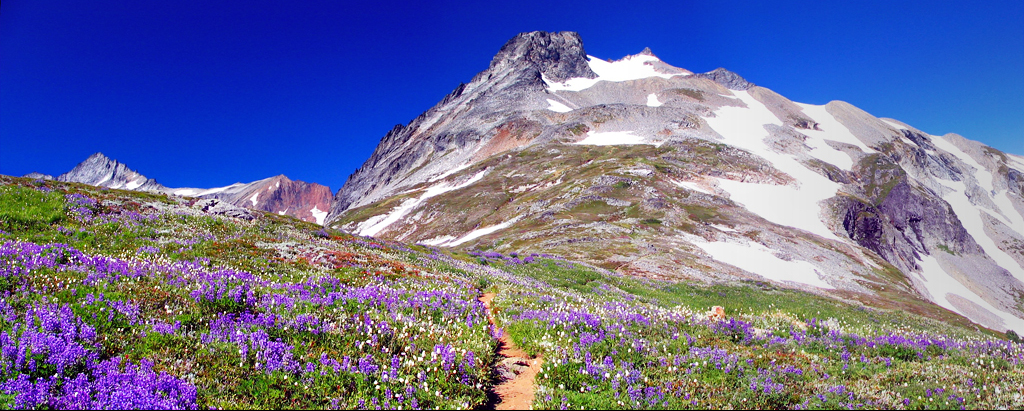
- Sahale Arm below Sahale Peak

Highest point
- Elevation: 8,680+ ft (2,650+ m) NGVD 29
- Prominence: 80 ft (20 m)
- Parent peak: Boston Peak
- Isolation: 0.34 mi (0.55 km)
- Coordinates: 48°29′28″N 121°02′20″W

Geography
- Location within Washington (state) Location within the United States
- Location: North Cascades National Park; Chelan / Skagit counties Washington, U.S.
- Parent range: North Cascades
- Topo map: USGS Cascade Pass

Climbing
- First ascent: August 1897 by John Charlton and Albert H. Sylvester
- Easiest route: Climb, class 3–4, from Cascade Pass

Sahale Peak is a jagged, glaciated mountain, in North Cascades National Park, in northern Washington state. It is 0.3 miles (0.48 km) south of its higher neighbor, Boston Peak, and the saddle between the two is 80 feet (24 m) lower than Sahale's summit. Quien Sabe Glacier is to the west of the ridge between the two peaks while Davenport Glacier is in a cirque east of this ridge and above Horseshoe Basin. Sahale Glacier is south of the summit and east of Sahale Arm, a ridge that extends southwest from Sahale to Cascade Pass.

== Climbing ==
Sahale Peak is noted for its panoramic views and is popular among mountaineers. The least technical route follows the Sahale Arm from the Cascade Pass Trail to the Sahale Glacier. From the glacier there is a class 3–4 climb to the summit. Another option is to traverse from the Sahale Arm onto the Quien Sabe Glacier and climb the glacier to the rock ridge north of the peak. The climb up this ridge is also class 3–4 but crosses some loose rock and is more exposed. Cascade Pass and the Sahale Arm can be reached from Marblemount to the west or from the east, it is accessible via a trail, from Stehekin, up the Stehekin River valley.

== Climate ==
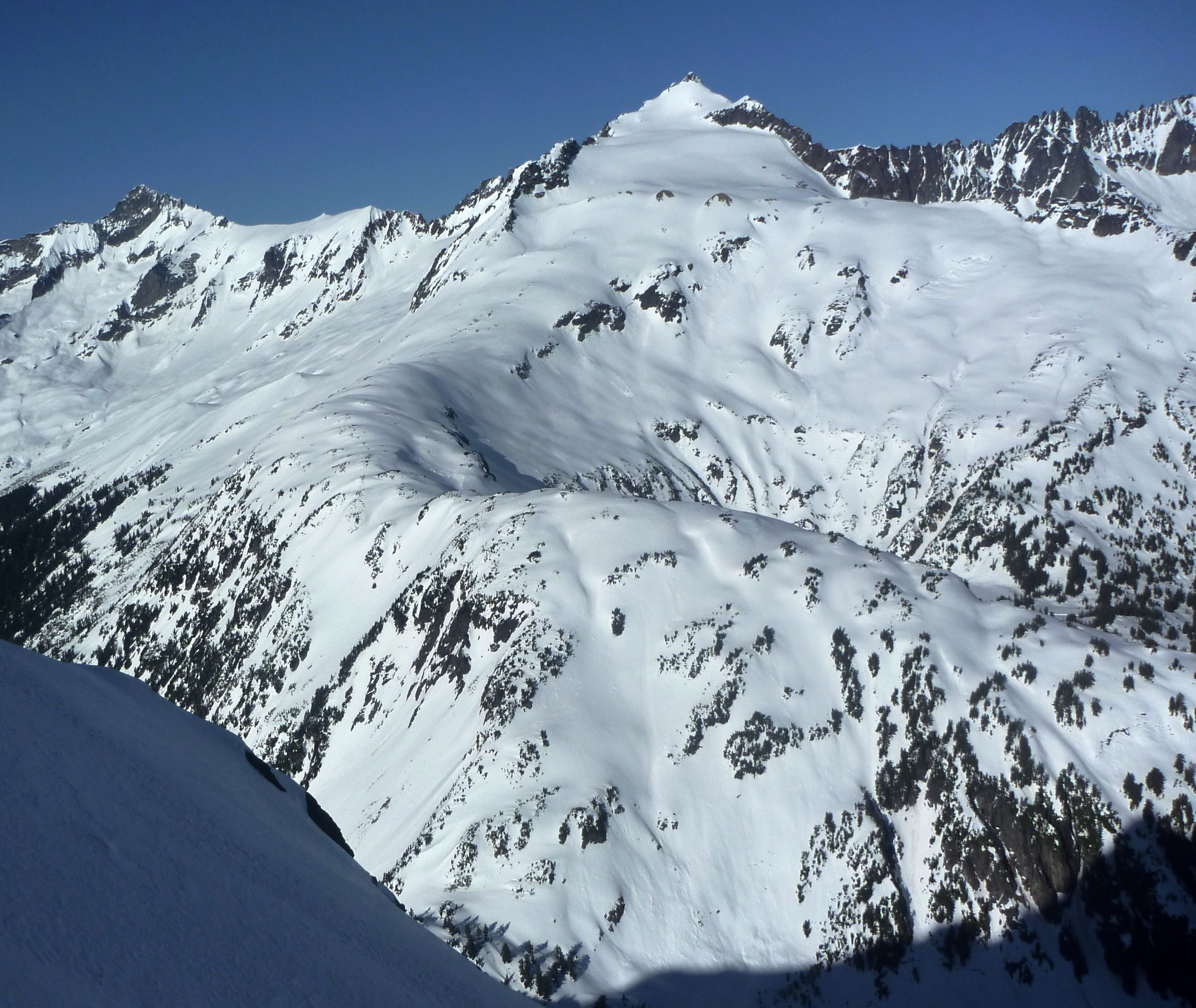
Sahale and Sahale Arm in winter

Sahale is located in the marine west coast climate zone of western North America. Most weather fronts originate in the Pacific Ocean, and travel northeast toward the Cascade Mountains. As fronts approach the North Cascades, they are forced upward by the peaks of the Cascade Range, causing them to drop their moisture in the form of rain or snowfall onto the Cascades (Orographic lift). As a result, the west side of the North Cascades experiences high precipitation, especially during the winter months in the form of snowfall. During winter months, weather is usually cloudy, but, due to high pressure systems over the Pacific Ocean that intensify during summer months, there is often little or no cloud cover during the summer.

== Geology ==
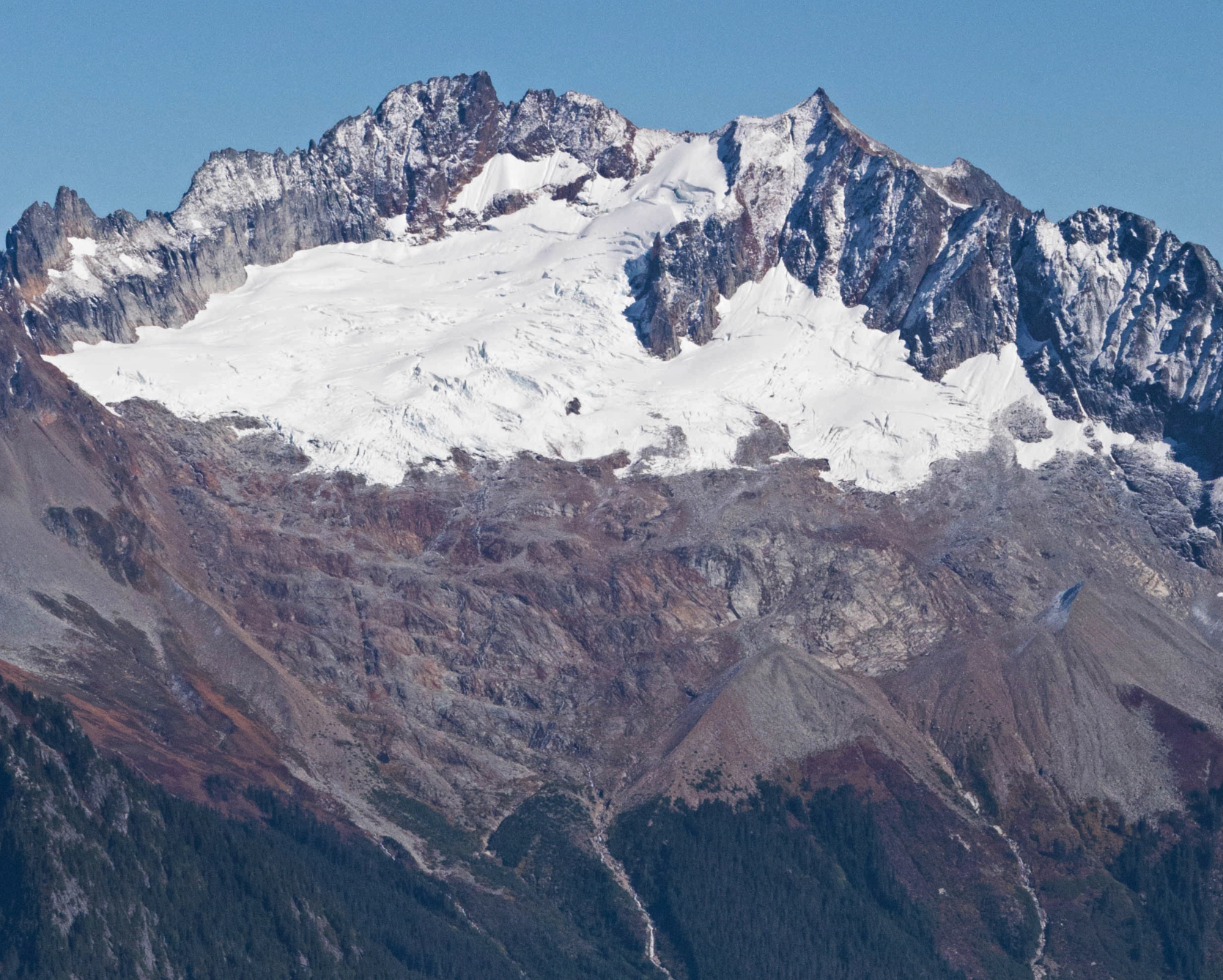
Sharkfin Tower, Boston Peak, Sahale, Quien Sabe Glacier seen from Hidden Lake Peaks

The North Cascades features some of the most rugged topography in the Cascade Range with craggy peaks and ridges, deep glacial valleys, and granite spires. Geological events occurring many years ago created the diverse topography and drastic elevation changes over the Cascade Range leading to various climate differences.

The history of the formation of the Cascade Mountains dates back millions of years ago to the late Eocene Epoch. With the North American Plate overriding the Pacific Plate, episodes of volcanic igneous activity persisted. In addition, small fragments of the oceanic and continental lithosphere called terranes created the North Cascades about 50 million years ago.

During the Pleistocene period dating back over two million years ago, glaciation advancing and retreating repeatedly scoured the landscape leaving deposits of rock debris. The U-shaped cross section of the river valleys is a result of recent glaciation. Uplift and faulting in combination with glaciation have been the dominant processes which have created the tall peaks and deep valleys of the North Cascades area.
