= Quien Sabe Glacier =

Glacier in the state of Washington

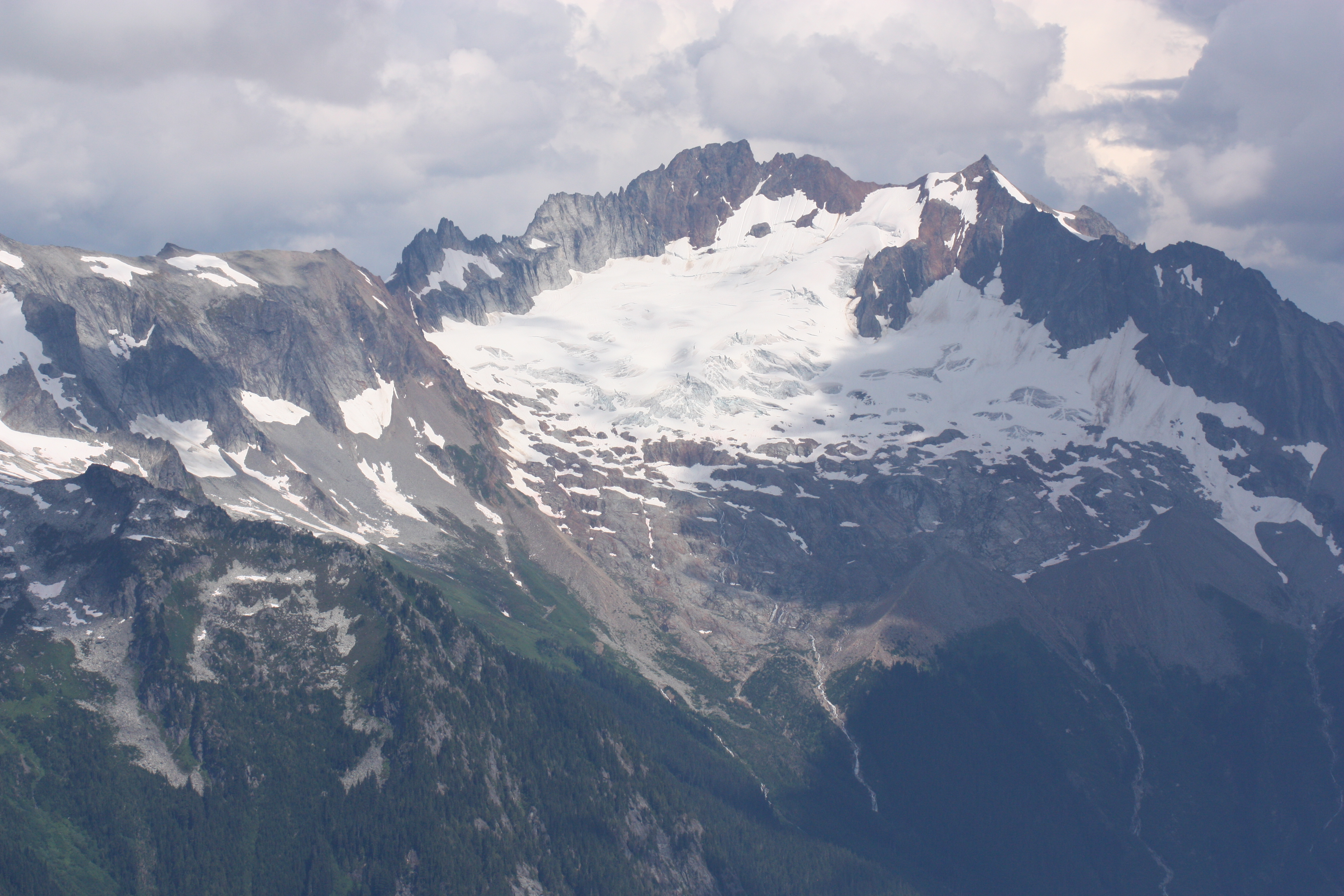
- Boston Peak above the Quien Sabe Glacier

- Location within Washington (state)
- Type: Mountain glacier
- Location: North Cascades National Park, Skagit County, Washington, U.S.
- Coordinates: 48°29′41″N 121°02′42″W
- Length: .60 mi (0.97 km)
- Terminus: Icefall/barren rock
- Status: Retreating

Quien Sabe Glacier is a glacier located on the west slopes of Boston Peak, North Cascades National Park in the U.S. state of Washington. Quien Sabe Glacier retreated 1200 meters from its Little Ice Age maximum in approximately 1850 to 1950. The glacier then advanced 55 meters between 1955 and 1975. It then started to retreat again and has retreated 200 meters from its largest extent in the 1970s to 2010. The glacier is approximately .60 mi (0.97 km) in length, .70 mi (1.13 km) in width at its terminus and descends from 8,400 to 7,200 ft (2,600 to 2,200 m). The glacier is separated by ridges from Sahale Glacier to the south and the much larger Boston Glacier to the north.

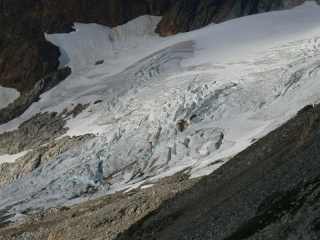
Crevasses on the Quien Sabe Glacier

== See also ==
- List of glaciers in the United States
