= Boston Glacier =

Glacier in the state of Washington

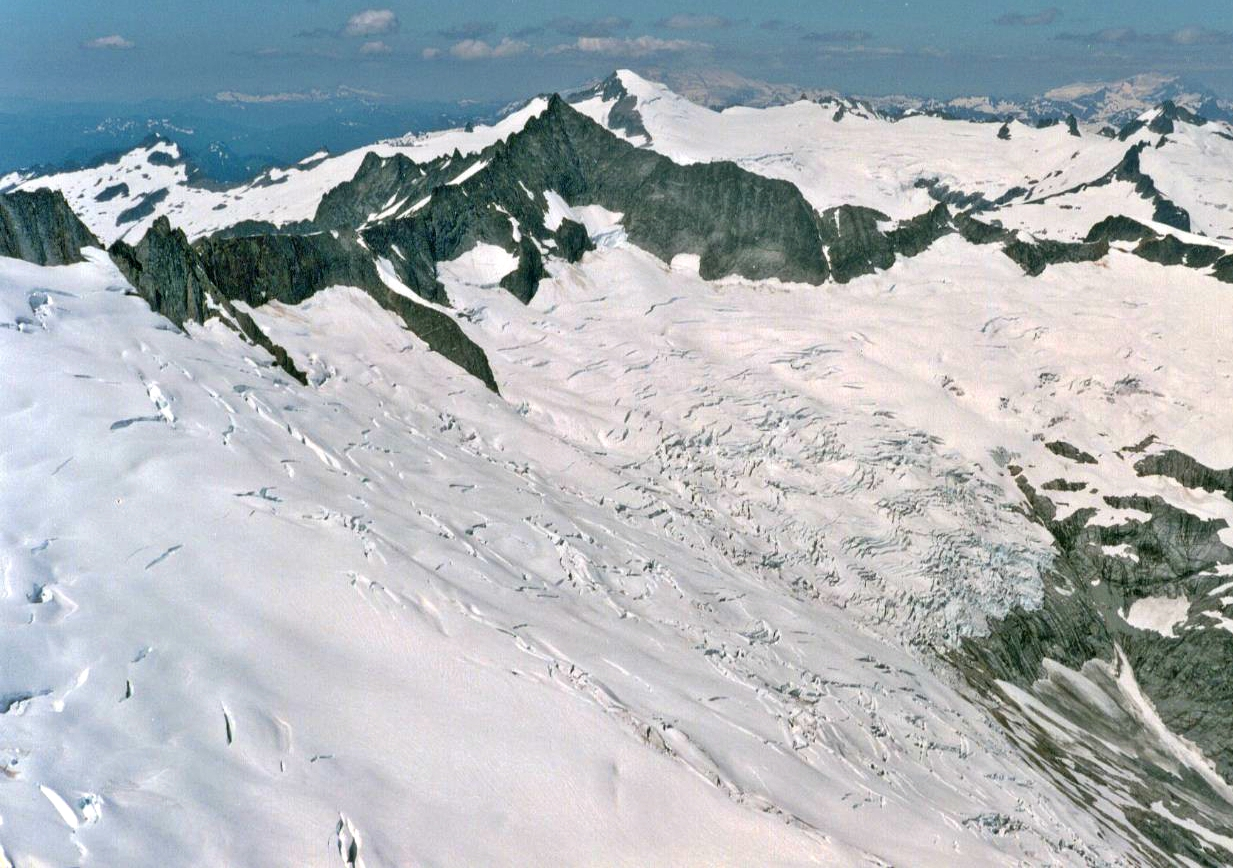
- Boston Glacier below Forbidden Peak

- Location within Washington (state)
- Type: Mountain glacier
- Location: North Cascades National Park, Skagit County, Washington, United States
- Coordinates: 48°30′22″N 121°02′01″W
- Length: 1 mi (1.6 km)
- Terminus: Icefall
- Status: Retreating

Boston Glacier is located in a large cirque below several mountain peaks in North Cascades National Park in the U.S. state of Washington. Approximately 1 mi (1.6 km) long but nearly 3.5 mi (5.6 km) wide, it is the largest glacier in North Cascades National Park. Extending in an arc from the north of Forbidden Peak, it is flanked by Boston Peak to the southwest and Buckner Mountain at its eastern margin, between which it lies below the arête known as Ripsaw Ridge. Another arête extending between Boston Peak, Sharkfin Tower, Forbidden Peak and further north separate Boston Glacier from the nearly adjoining Quien Sabe and Forbidden Glaciers. Boston Glacier has been in an overall state of retreat since the end of the Little Ice Age around the year 1850. A moderate advance occurred between 1950 and the mid-1970s; however, the retreat resumed and between 1972 and 2006 its terminus retreated 1,470 ft (450 m).

== See also ==
- List of glaciers in the United States
