= Cascade River (Washington) =

River in the United States

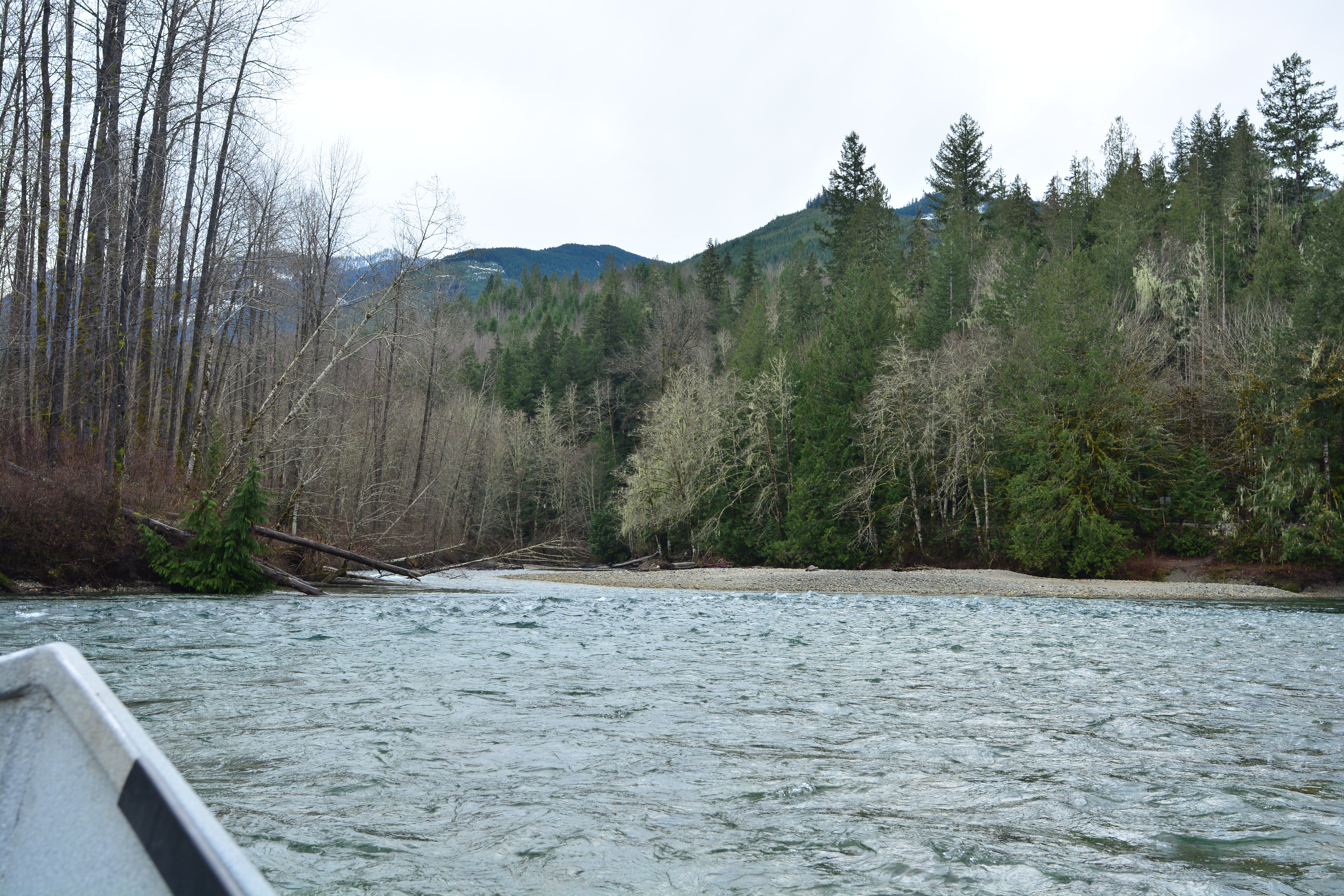
- Mouth of the Cascade River, seen from the Skagit

- Location of the mouth of the Cascade River in Washington Cascade River (Washington) (the United States)

Location
- Country: United States
- State: Washington
- County: Skagit

Physical characteristics
- Source: Confluence of Middle and South Forks
  - location: North Cascades
  - coordinates: 48°27′45″N 121°9′50″W
- Mouth: Skagit River
  - location: Marblemount
  - coordinates: 48°31′25″N 121°25′47″W

National Wild and Scenic River
- Designated: November 10, 1978

The Cascade River is a river in the U.S. state of Washington. It is a tributary of the Skagit River which it joins at the census-designated place of Marblemount. It is a National Wild and Scenic River.

== South Fork ==
The South Fork originates from South Cascade Lake and flows west briefly before turning north quickly and flowing in that direction until it converges with the Middle Fork to form the Cascade River Proper. About halfway between its source and its mouth the river flows through a gorge called Box Canyon.

== Middle Fork ==
The Middle Fork begins at the toe of the Middle Cascade Glacier. It flows briefly north, then west to join the South Fork, forming the Cascade River Proper. The river drops over Gemini Falls just above its mouth.

== North Fork ==
The North Fork originates at Cascade Pass, flows north briefly and then does a wide 180 degree turn until it reaches the Cascade River proper. It picks up several large glacier fed streams shortly below its source.

== Cascade River proper ==
Beginning at the confluence of the South and Middle Forks, the Cascade River flows north before turning west just before the North Fork enters then turning northwest. At the mouth of Marble Creek, the river turns west again until its confluence with the Skagit.

== Tributaries ==
South Fork

- Salix Creek
- High Log Creek
- Drop Creek
- Milt Creek
- Pincer Creek

Middle Fork

- Cleve Creek

North Fork

- Soldier Boy Creek
- Midas Creek
- Morning Star Creek
- Boston Creek
- Gilbert Creek
- Eldorado Creek
- Roush Creek
- Hidden Lake Creek

Mainstream

- Barrett Creek
- Sonny Boy Creek
- Swamp Creek
- Kindy Creek
- Hard Creek
- Found Creek
- Sibley Creek
- Marble Creek
- Lookout Creek
- Irene Creek
- Day Creek
- Boulder Creek
- Clark Creek
- Jordan Creek

== See also ==
- List of Washington rivers
- Waterfalls of the North Fork Cascade River Valley
