= Forbidden Peak =

Mountain in Washington, United States

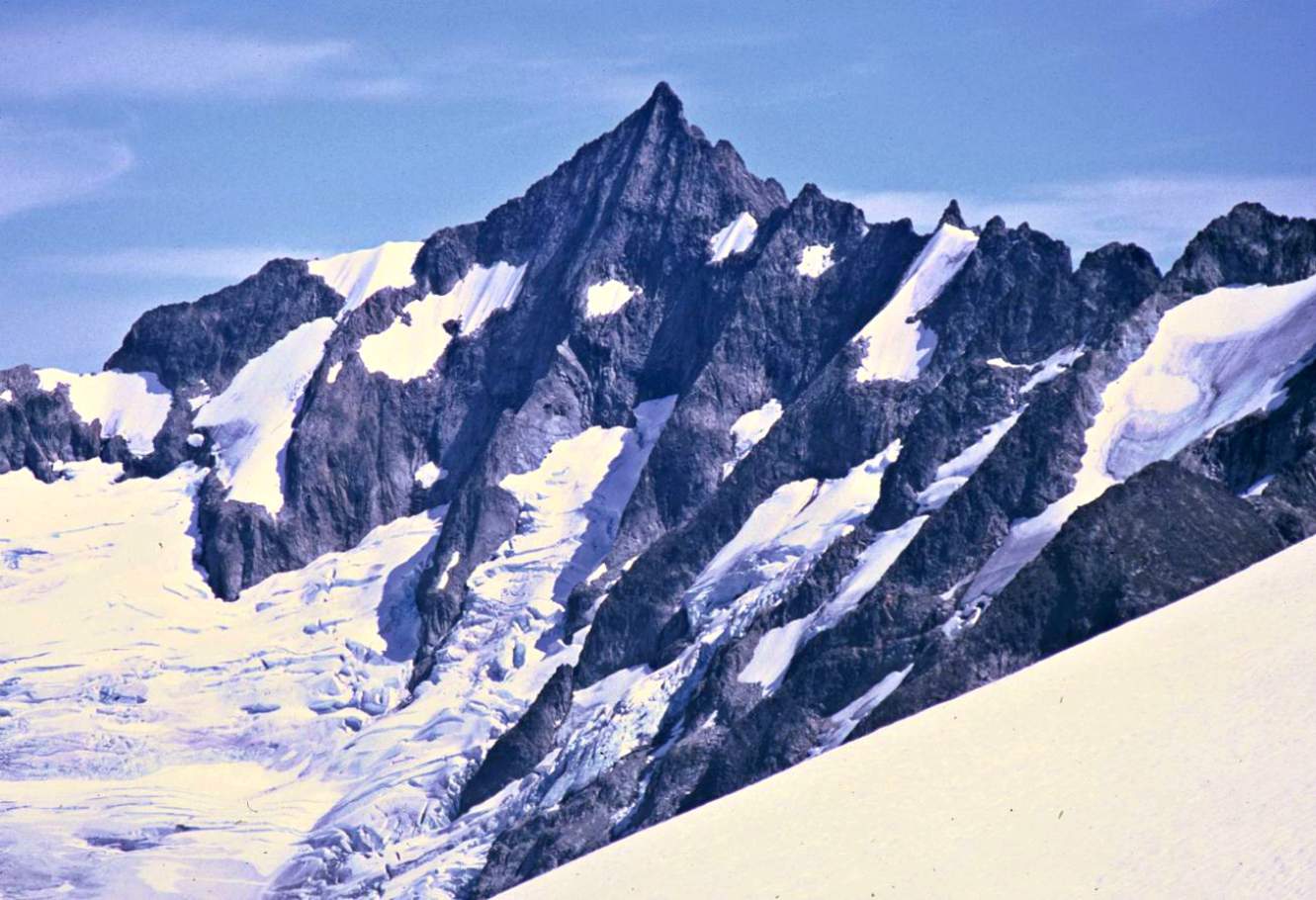
- Forbidden Peak, northwest aspect

Highest point
- Elevation: 8,815 ft (2,687 m) NGVD 29
- Prominence: 1,055 ft (322 m)
- Coordinates: 48°30′41″N 121°03′28″W

Geography
- Location within Washington (state) Location within the United States
- Interactive map of Forbidden Peak
- Location: Location in Washington, U.S.
- Parent range: North Cascades
- Topo map: USGS Forbidden Peak

Climbing
- First ascent: June 1, 1940 by Lloyd Anderson, Fred Beckey, Helmy Beckey, Jim Crooks, Dave Lind
- Easiest route: West Ridge class 5.6 rock

Forbidden Peak is an 8,815 feet (2,687 m) glacial horn located in North Cascades National Park, in Skagit County of Washington state. It is part of the North Cascades and is located near Cascade Pass. Forbidden Peak features a rock climbing route named West Ridge route which is featured in Fifty Classic Climbs of North America. The peak was first climbed by a party consisting of Fred Beckey, his brother Helmy Beckey, Jim Crooks, Lloyd Anderson and Dave Lind in 1940.

== Climate ==
Forbidden Peak is located in the marine west coast climate zone of western North America. Most weather fronts originate in the Pacific Ocean, and travel northeast toward the Cascade Mountains. As fronts approach the North Cascades, they are forced upward by the peaks of the Cascade Range, causing them to drop their moisture in the form of rain or snowfall onto the Cascades. As a result, the west side of the North Cascades experiences high precipitation, especially during the winter months in the form of snowfall. Due to its temperate climate and proximity to the Pacific Ocean, areas west of the Cascade Crest very rarely experience temperatures below 0 °F (−18 °C) or above 80 °F (27 °C). During winter months, weather is usually cloudy, but, due to high pressure systems over the Pacific Ocean that intensify during summer months, there is often little or no cloud cover during the summer. Because of maritime influence, snow tends to be wet and heavy, resulting in high avalanche danger. This climate supports the Forbidden Glacier in the northwest cirque, the immense Boston Glacier to the east, and glacial remnants on the south side in Boston Basin. These glaciers carved Forbidden Peak into a classic horn.

== Geology ==
The North Cascades features some of the most rugged topography in the Cascade Range with craggy peaks and ridges, deep glacial valleys, and granite spires. Geological events occurring many years ago created the diverse topography and drastic elevation changes over the Cascade Range leading to various climate differences.

The history of the formation of the Cascade Mountains dates back millions of years ago to the late Eocene Epoch. With the North American Plate overriding the Pacific Plate, episodes of volcanic igneous activity persisted. In addition, small fragments of the oceanic and continental lithosphere called terranes created the North Cascades about 50 million years ago.

During the Pleistocene period dating back over two million years ago, glaciation advancing and retreating repeatedly scoured the landscape leaving deposits of rock debris. The U-shaped cross section of the river valleys is a result of recent glaciation. Uplift and faulting in combination with glaciation have been the dominant processes which have created the tall peaks and deep valleys of the North Cascades area.
