= List of glaciers in the United States =

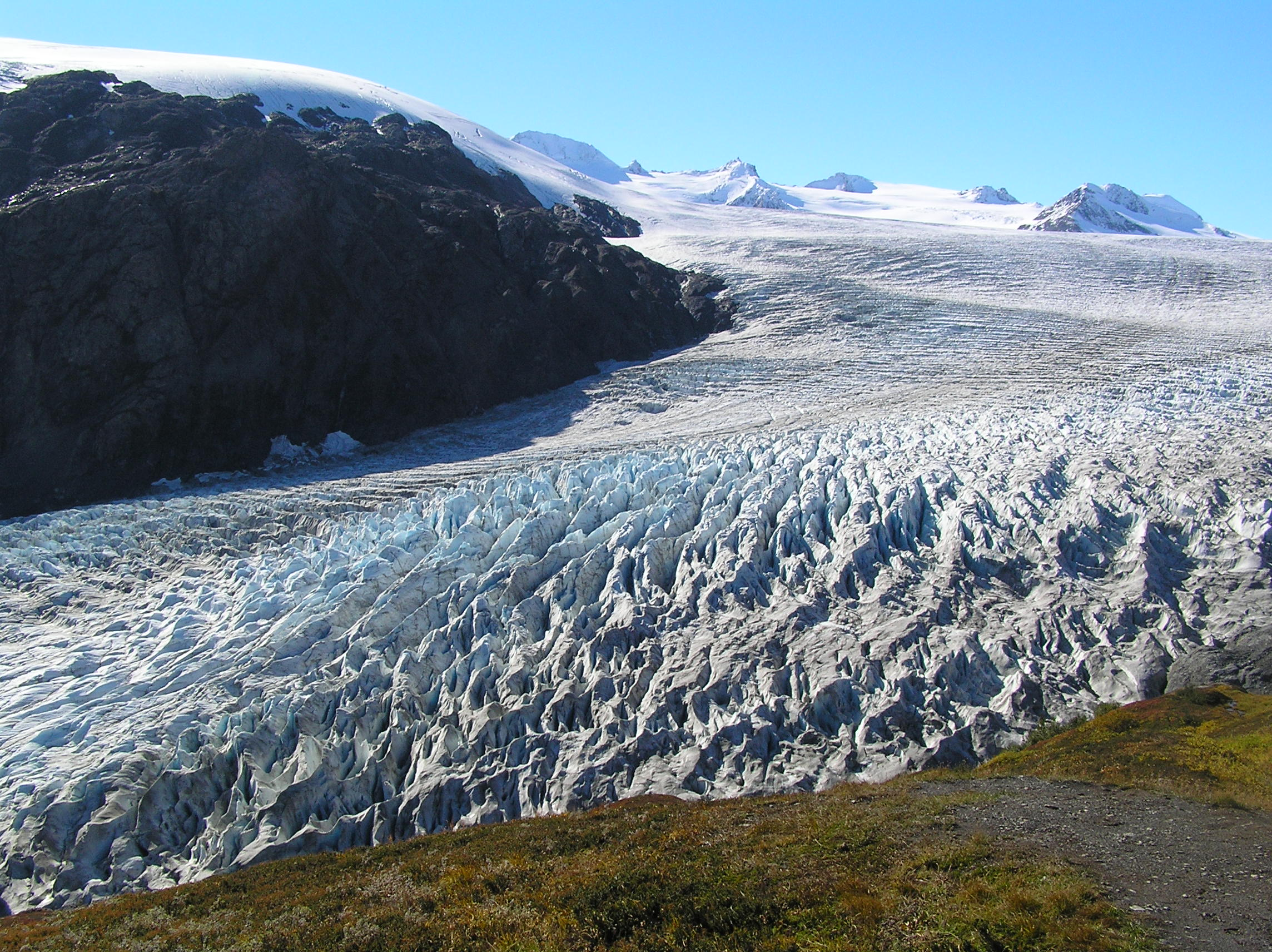
Exit Glacier, Alaska

Glaciers are located in ten states, with the vast majority in Alaska. The southernmost named glacier is the Lilliput Glacier in Tulare County, east of the Central Valley of California.

Apart from Alaska, around 1330 glaciers, 1175 perennial snow fields, and 35 buried-ice features have been identified.

== Glaciers of Alaska ==
There are approximately 664 named glaciers in Alaska according to the Geographic Names Information System (GNIS).

- Agassiz Glacier - Saint Elias Mountains
- Aialik Glacier - Kenai Peninsula
- Alsek Glacier - Glacier Bay
- Aurora Glacier - Glacier Bay
- Bacon Glacier
- Barnard Glacier
- Bear Glacier - Aialik Peninsula, Resurrection Bay
- Bering Glacier
- Black Rapids
- Brady Glacier
- Brooks Glacier - Alaska Range
- Buckskin Glacier - Alaska Range
- Burns Glacier (Alaska) - Kenai Mountains
- Byron Glacier - Kenai Mountains
- Caldwell Glacier - Alaska Range
- Cantwell Glacier - Alaska Range
- Carroll Glacier - Glacier Bay
- Casement Glacier - Glacier Bay
- Castner Glacier - Alaska Range
- Charley Glacier - Glacier Bay
- Chedotlothna Glacier - Alaska Range
- Chenega Glacier - Prince William Sound
- Chickamin Glacier (Alaska)
- Clark Glacier - Glacier Bay
- Columbia Glacier - Prince William Sound
- Cul-de-sac Glacier - Kichatna Mountains
- Cushing Glacier - Glacier Bay
- Dall Glacier - Alaska Range
- Davidson Glacier - Lynn Canal
- Double Glacier
- Eldridge Glacier - Alaska Range
- Exit Glacier - Kenai Peninsula
- Fairweather Glacier
- Fleischmann Glacier - Kichatna Mountains
- Foraker Glacier - Alaska Range
- Geikie Glacier - Glacier Bay
- Gilman Glacier - Glacier Bay
- Godwin Glacier
- Grand Pacific Glacier - Glacier Bay
- Grand Plateau Glacier - Glacier Bay
- Grewingk Glacier - Kenai Peninsula
- Gulkana Glacier - south flank of the eastern Alaska Range
- Guyot Glacier
- Harding Icefield - Kenai Peninsula
- Harvard Glacier - Prince William Sound
- Hawkins Glacier
- Herbert Glacier - Juneau Icefield
- Herron Glacier - Alaska Range
- Holgate Glacier - Kenai Fjords National Park
- Hoonah Glacier - Glacier Bay
- Hubbard Glacier - Disenchantment Bay
- Hugh Miller Glacier - Glacier Bay
- John Glacier - Glacier Bay
- Johns Hopkins Glacier - Glacier Bay
- Juneau Icefield
- Kadachan Glacier - Glacier Bay
- Kahiltna Glacier - Alaska Range
- Kanikula Glacier - Alaska Range
- Kashoto Glacier - Glacier Bay
- Kennicott Glacier
- Klutlan Glacier
- Kuskulana Glacier
- Lacuna Glacier - Alaska Range
- Lamplugh Glacier - Glacier Bay
- LeConte Glacier
- La Perouse Glacier - Glacier Bay
- Lituya Glacier
- Logan Glacier
- Malaspina Glacier
- Margerie Glacier - Glacier Bay
- Martin River Glacier
- Matanuska Glacier
- McBride Glacier - Glacier Bay
- McCall Glacier (Alaska) - Brooks Range, Romanzoff Mountains
- McCarty Glacier - Kenai Peninsula/Harding Icefield
- Meares Glacier - Prince William Sound
- Mendenhall Glacier
- Miles Glacier
- Morse Glacier - Glacier Bay
- Muir Glacier - Glacier Bay
- Muldrow Glacier - Alaska Range
- Nabesna Glacier
- North Crillon Glacier - Glacier Bay
- Novatak Glacier
- Pedersen Glacier - Kenai Fjords National Park
- Peters Glacier (Alaska Range) - Alaska Range
- Peters Glacier (Brooks Range) - Brooks Range
- Portage Glacier
- Princeton Glacier - Kenai Peninsula
- Reid Glacier - Glacier Bay
- Rendu Glacier - Glacier Bay
- Riggs Glacier - Glacier Bay
- Ruth Glacier - Alaska Range
- Sargent Icefield - Kenai Peninsula
- Scott Glacier
- Shadows Glacier - Kichatna Mountains
- Shelf Glacier - Kichatna Mountains
- Shoup Glacier - Prince William Sound
- Stikine Icecap
- Straightaway Glacier - Alaska Range
- Sunrise Glacier (Alaska) - Alaska Range
- Sunset Glacier - Alaska Range
- Surprise Glacier (Alaska Range) - Alaska Range
- Taku Glacier - Taku River/Juneau Icefield
- Tana Glacier
- Tatina Glacier - Kichatna Mountains
- Tazlina Glacier
- Ted Stevens Ice Field - the northern and eastern half of the Chugach Mountains
- Tokositna Glacier - Alaska Range
- Topeka Glacier - Glacier Bay
- Toyatte Glacier - Glacier Bay
- Traleika Glacier - Alaska Range
- Tustumena Glacier
- Tyeen Glacier - Glacier Bay
- Tyndall Glacier
- Variegated Glacier
- West Fork Glacier (Alaska Range) - Alaska Range
- Worthington Glacier
- Yahtse Glacier
- Yale Glacier
- Yakutat Glacier
- Yentna Glacier - Alaska Range

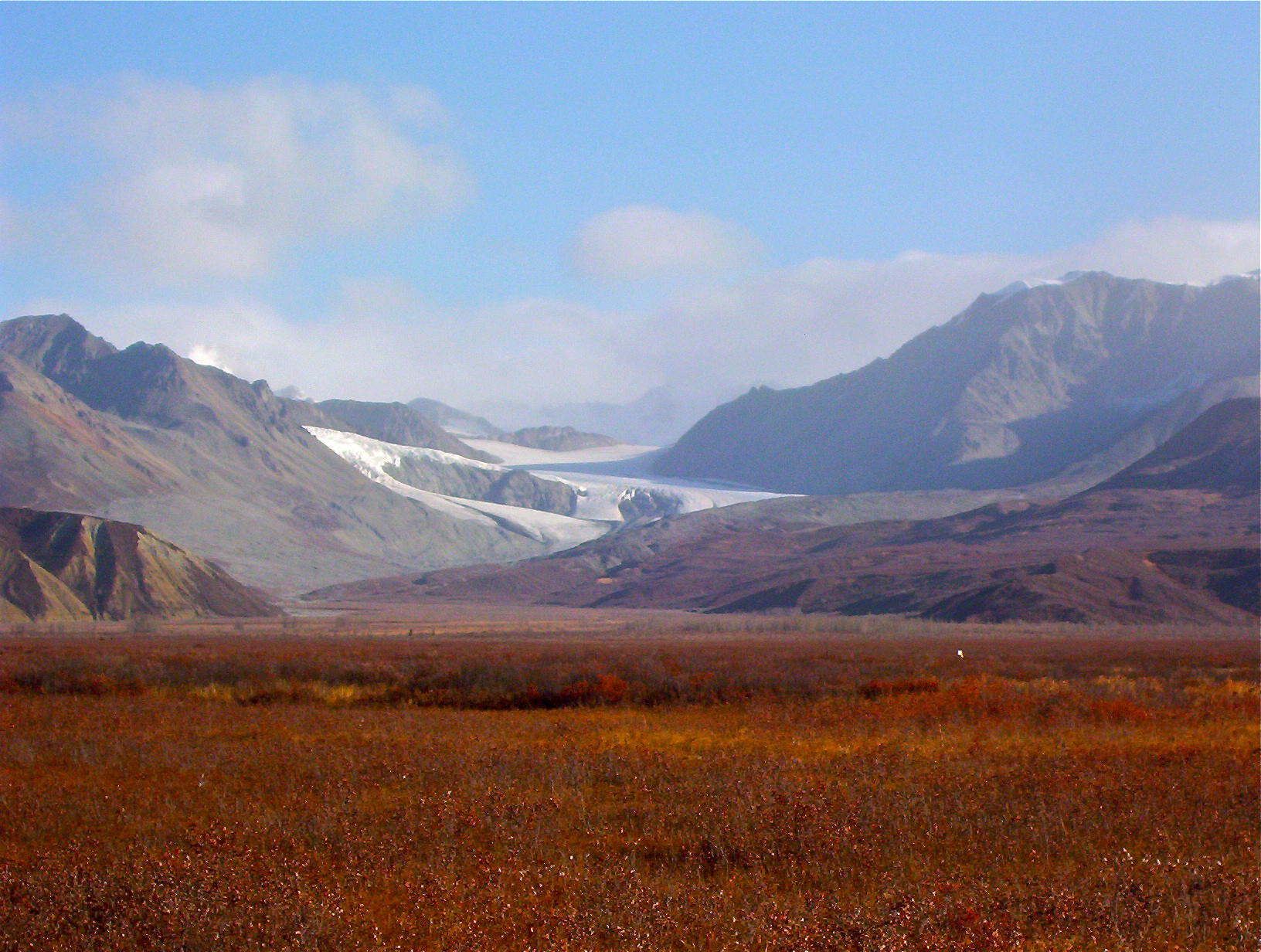
Gulkana glacier in the Alaska Range

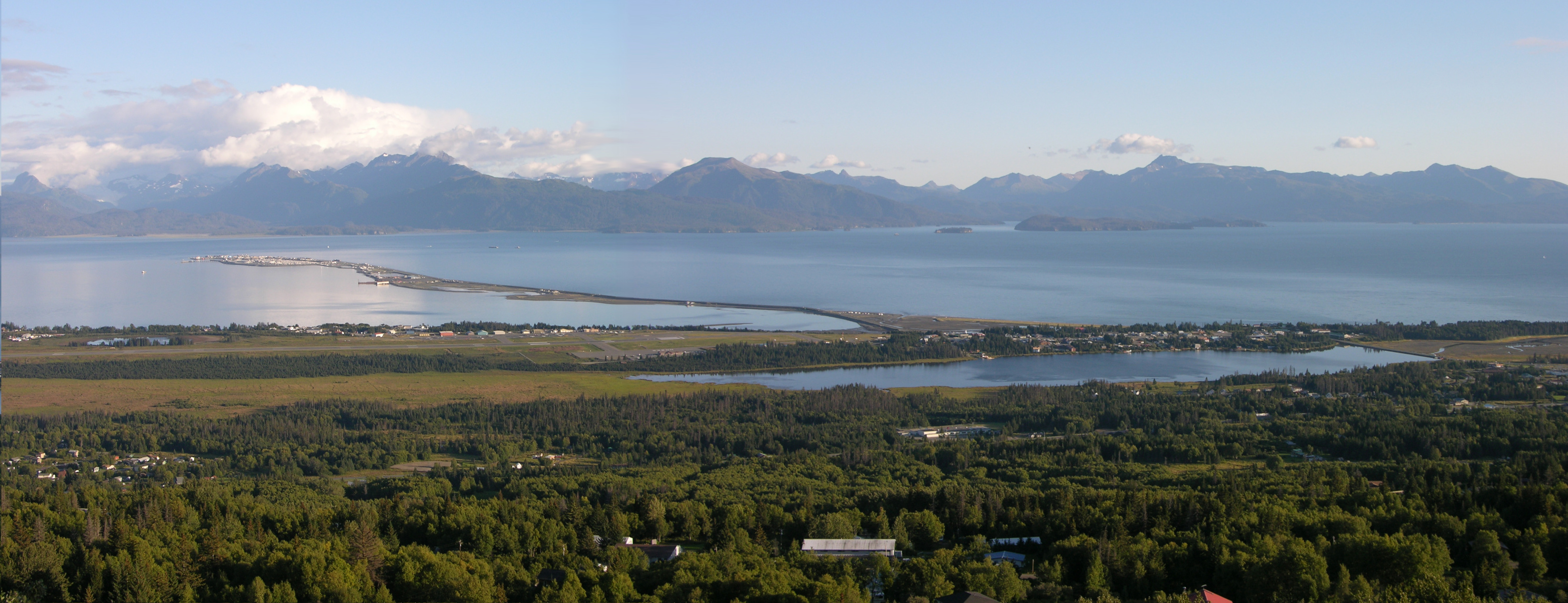
The Homer Spit is believed to be the remains of a glacial moraine.

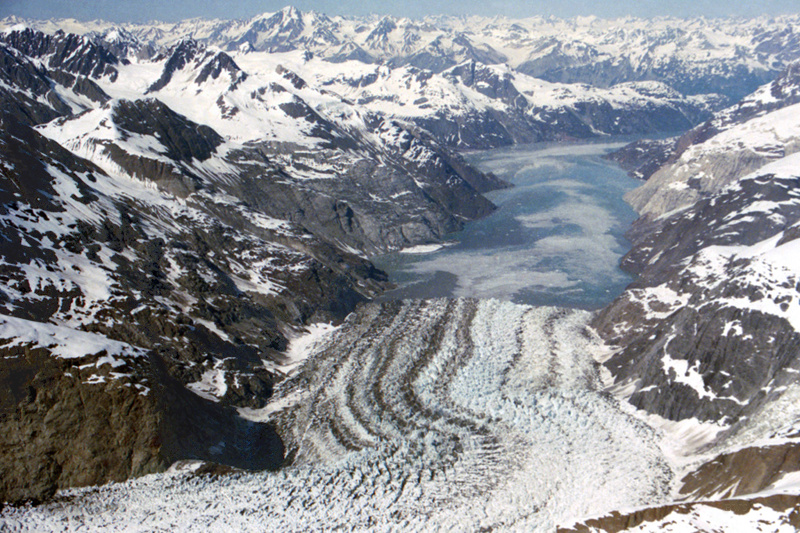
Johns Hopkins Glacier in Glacier Bay National Park and Preserve

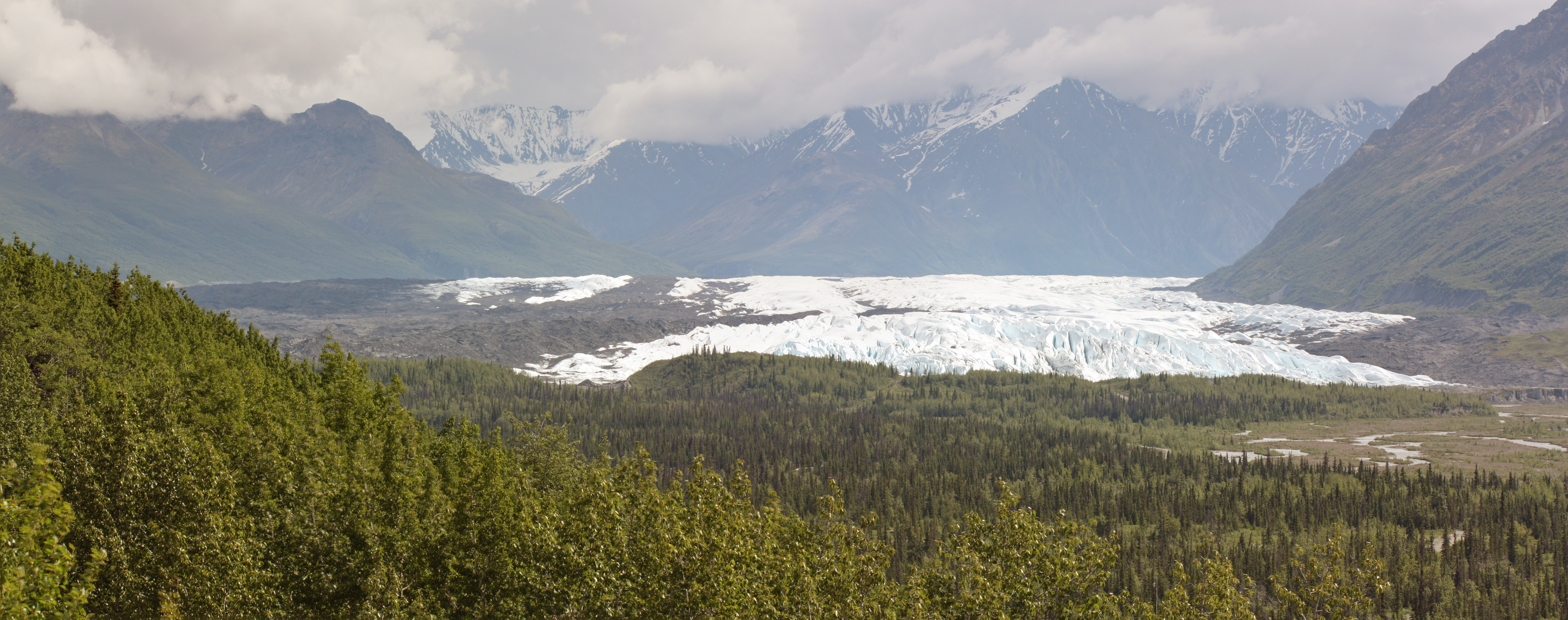
Matanuska Glacier and peaks of the Chugach Mountains

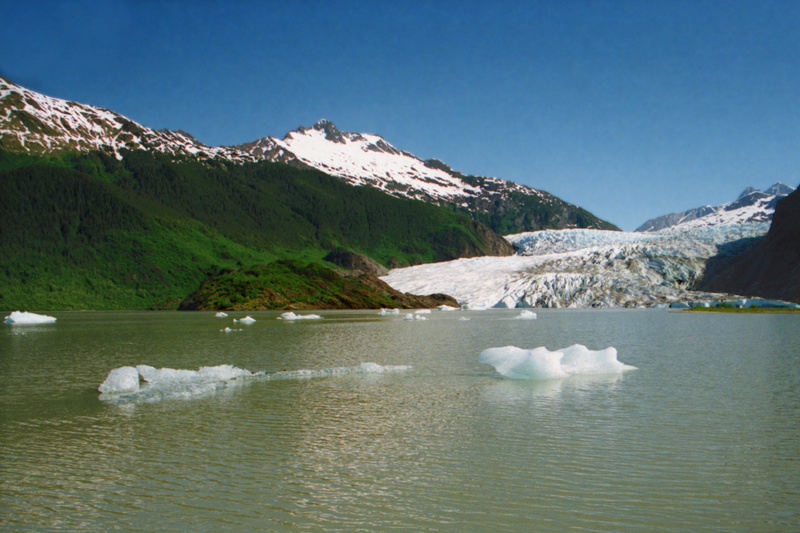
Mendenhall Glacier and the Coast Mountains, Juneau, Alaska

== Glaciers of the Pacific Coast Ranges ==
The Pacific Coast Ranges include glaciers in the three states on the Pacific Coast.

=== Washington ===
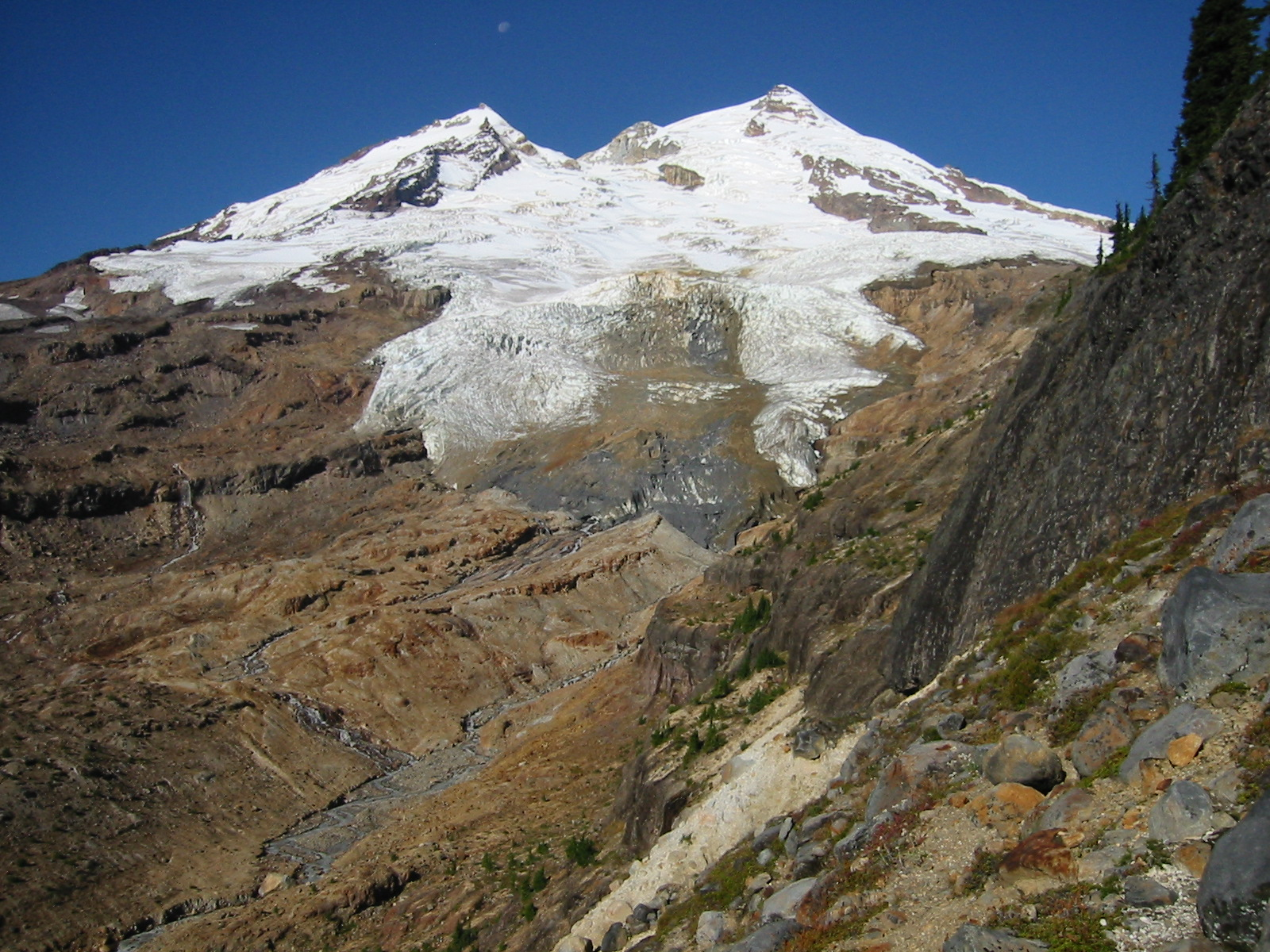
Boulder Glacier, Mount Baker

There are over 3,000 glaciers in Washington state, with 186 named according to the Geographic Names Information System (GNIS). However, the 1980 eruption of Mount St. Helens eliminated nine of its eleven named glaciers and only the new glacier known as Crater Glacier has been reestablished since.

Olympic Mountains

Mount Olympus

- Blue Glacier
- Hoh Glacier
- Hubert Glacier
- Humes Glacier
- Ice River Glacier
- Jeffers Glacier
- White Glacier

Other peaks in the Olympic Mountains

- Anderson Glacier
- Cameron Glaciers
- Carrie Glacier
- Eel Glacier
- Fairchild Glacier
- Hanging Glacier
- Lillian Glacier
- Queets Glacier

North Cascades (non-volcanoes)

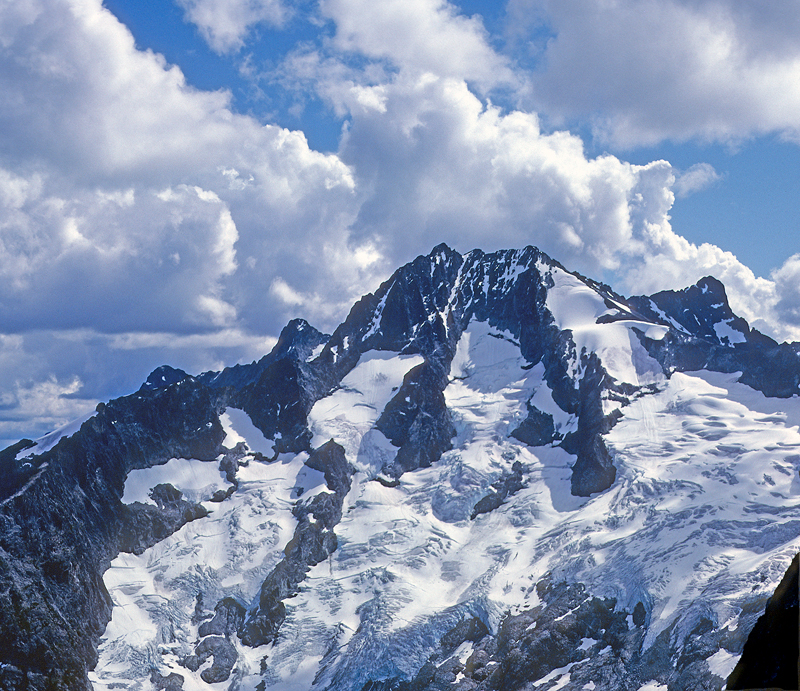
Company Glacier

- Banded Glacier - Mount Logan
- Blue Glacier (Chelan County, Washington) - Agnes Mountain
- Borealis Glacier
- Boston Glacier - Boston Peak
- Buckner Glacier
- Butterfly Glacier
- Cache Col Glacier
- Challenger Glacier - Mount Challenger
- Chickamin Glacier - Dome Peak
- Clark Glacier (Washington)
- Colchuck Glacier
- Colonial Glacier
- Columbia Glacier - Columbia Peak
- Company Glacier
- Crystal Glacier - Mount Shuksan
- Dana Glacier (Washington)
- Daniel Glacier - Mount Daniel
- Dark Glacier
- Davenport Glacier
- Depot Glacier - Mount Redoubt
- Diobsud Creek Glacier
- Dome Glacier
- Douglas Glacier (Washington)
- East Nooksack Glacier - Mount Shuksan
- Eldorado Glacier - Eldorado Peak
- Entiat Glacier
- Forbidden Glacier
- Foss Glacier - Mount Hinman
- Fremont Glacier (Washington)
- Garden Glacier
- Goode Glacier
- Grant Glacier (Washington)
- Green Lake Glacier
- Hanging Glacier (Jefferson County, Washington)
- Hanging Glacier (Mount Shuksan) - Mount Shuksan
- Hidden Creek Glacier - Hagan Mountain
- Hinman Glacier - Mount Hinman
- Ice Cliff Glacier
- Inspiration Glacier - Eldorado Peak
- Isella Glacier
- Jerry Glacier
- Katsuk Glacier
- Kimtah Glacier
- Klawatti Glacier
- Ladder Creek Glacier
- Lewis Glacier (Washington)
- Lower Curtis Glacier
- Lyall Glacier
- Lyman Glacier (North Cascades)
- Lynch Glacier - Mount Daniel
- Mary Green Glacier
- McAllister Glacier
- Mesahchie Glacier
- Middle Cascade Glacier
- Neve Glacier - Snowfield Peak
- Nohokomeen Glacier
- Noisy Creek Glacier
- North Klawatti Glacier
- Overcoat Glacier
- Pilz Glacier
- Price Glacier (Mount Shuksan) - Mount Shuksan
- Queest-alb Glacier or (Three Fingers Glacier)
- Quien Sabe Glacier
- Redoubt Glacier - Mount Redoubt
- Richardson Glacier (Washington)
- S Glacier
- Sahale Glacier
- Sandalee Glacier
- Sherpa Glacier
- Silver Glacier
- Snow Creek Glacier
- So-Bahli-Alhi Glacier
- South Cascade Glacier
- Spider Glacier (Phelps Ridge, Washington)
- Spider Glacier (Spider Mountain, Washington)
- Spire Glacier
- Stuart Glacier
- Sulphide Glacier - Mount Shuksan
- Table Mountain Glacier
- Terror Glacier (Washington)
- Thunder Glacier (Skagit County, Washington)
- Upper Curtis Glacier - Mount Shuksan
- Watson Glacier
- West Depot Glacier - Mount Redoubt
- West Nooksack Glacier
- Whatcom Glacier
- White Salmon Glacier (Mount Shuksan) - Mount Shuksan
- Wyeth Glacier
- Yawning Glacier

Mount Baker

- Bastile Glacier
- Boulder Glacier
- Coleman Glacier
- Deming Glacier (Washington)
- Easton Glacier
- Hadley Glacier
- Mazama Glacier
- No Name Glacier
- Park Glacier
- Rainbow Glacier (Washington)
- Roosevelt Glacier
- Sholes Glacier
- Squak Glacier
- Talum Glaciers
- Thunder Glacier (Mount Baker)

Glacier Peak

- Chocolate Glacier
- Cool Glacier
- Dusty Glacier
- Ermine Glacier
- Honeycomb Glacier
- Kennedy Glacier
- Milk Lake Glacier
- North Guardian Glacier
- Ptarmigan Glacier
- Scimitar Glacier
- Sitkum Glacier
- Suiattle Glacier
- Vista Glacier
- White Chuck Glacier
- White River Glacier

Mount Rainier

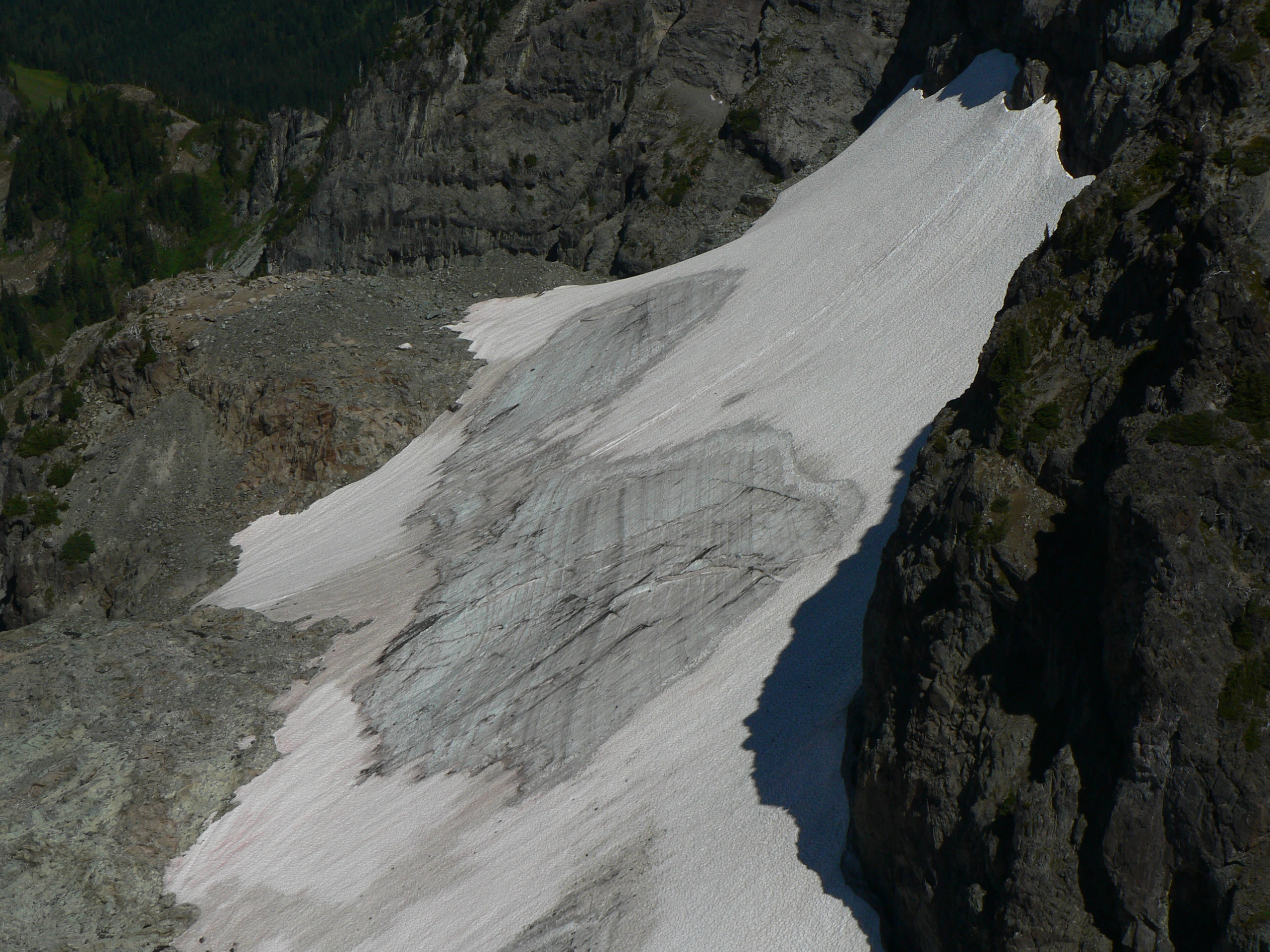
Sarvent Glacier, Cowlitz Chimneys.

- Carbon Glacier
- Cowlitz Glacier
- Edmunds Glacier
- Emmons Glacier
- Flett Glacier
- Fryingpan Glacier - Little Tahoma
- Ingraham Glacier
- Inter Glacier
- Kautz Glacier
- Liberty Cap Glacier
- Nisqually Glacier
- North Mowich Glacier
- Ohanapecosh Glacier - Little Tahoma
- Paradise Glacier
- Pinnacle Glacier (Lewis County, Washington)
- Puyallup Glacier
- Pyramid Glacier
- Russell Glacier
- Sarvant Glacier — Cowlitz Chimneys
- South Mowich Glacier
- South Tahoma Glacier
- Success Glacier
- Tahoma Glacier
- Unicorn Glacier (Extinct)
- Van Trump Glacier
- Wilson Glacier
- Whitman Glacier - Little Tahoma
- Williwakas Glacier
- Winthrop Glacier

Goat Rocks

- Conrad Glacier
- McCall Glacier
- Meade Glacier
- Packwood Glacier

Mount Adams

- Adams Glacier
- Avalanche Glacier
- Crescent Glacier
- Gotchen Glacier
- Klickitat Glacier
- Lava Glacier
- Lyman Glacier
- Mazama Glacier
- Pinnacle Glacier
- Rusk Glacier
- Wilson Glacier
- White Salmon Glacier

Mount St. Helens

Mount St. Helens once had eleven named glaciers, but the 1980 eruption of the volcano eliminated nine glaciers and the two remaining aren't recognized. One newly formed glacier now resides in the caldera of the volcano.

- Crater Glacier
- Shoestring Glacier

=== Oregon ===
There are up to 42 glaciers in Oregon, with 35 named according to the Geographic Names Information System (GNIS).

Wallowa Mountains

- Benson Glacier - Eagle Cap

Mount Hood

- Coe Glacier
- Coalman Glacier
- Eliot Glacier
- Glisan Glacier
- Ladd Glacier
- Langille Glacier
- Newton Clark Glacier
- Palmer Glacier
- Reid Glacier
- Sandy Glacier
- White River Glacier
- Zigzag Glacier

Mount Jefferson

- Jefferson Park Glacier
- Milk Creek Glacier
- Russell Glacier
- Waldo Glacier
- Whitewater Glacier

Three Sisters Region

- Bend Glacier - Broken Top
- Carver Glacier - South Sister
- Clark Glacier - South Sister
- Collier Glacier - North & Middle Sisters
- Crook Glacier - Broken Top
- Diller Glacier - Middle Sister
- Eugene Glacier - South Sister
- Hayden Glacier - Middle Sister
- Irving Glacier - Middle Sister
- Lewis Glacier - South Sister
- Linn Glacier - North Sister
- Lost Creek Glacier - South Sister
- Prouty Glacier - South Sister
- Renfrew Glacier - Middle Sister
- Skinner Glacier - South Sister
- Thayer Glacier - North Sister
- Villard Glacier - North Sister

Other Cascade Peaks

- Lathrop Glacier - Mount Thielsen^{A}

=== California ===
There are around 75 glaciers in California, with 20 named according to the Geographic Names Information System (GNIS).

Mount Shasta

Mount Shasta is a volcano with seven named glaciers in the northern region of California.

- Bolam Glacier
- Hotlum Glacier
- Konwakiton Glacier
- Mud Creek Glacier
- Watkins Glacier
- Whitney Glacier
- Wintun Glacier

Sierra Nevada

- Conness Glacier - Mount Conness
- Dana Glacier - Mount Dana
- Darwin Glacier - Mount Darwin
- Goethe Glacier - Mount Goethe
- Lilliput Glacier - Mount Stewart - southernmost glacier in the United States
- Lyell Glacier - Mount Lyell
- Maclure Glacier - Mount Maclure
- Matthes Glaciers
- Mendel Glacier - Mount Mendel
- Middle Palisade Glacier - Middle Palisade
- Mount Fiske Glacier - Mount Fiske
- Mount Warlow Glacier - Mount Warlow
- Norman Clyde Glacier - Norman Clyde Peak
- Palisade Glacier - North Palisade
- Powell Glacier - Mount Powell

== Glaciers of Nevada (in the Basin and Range Province) ==
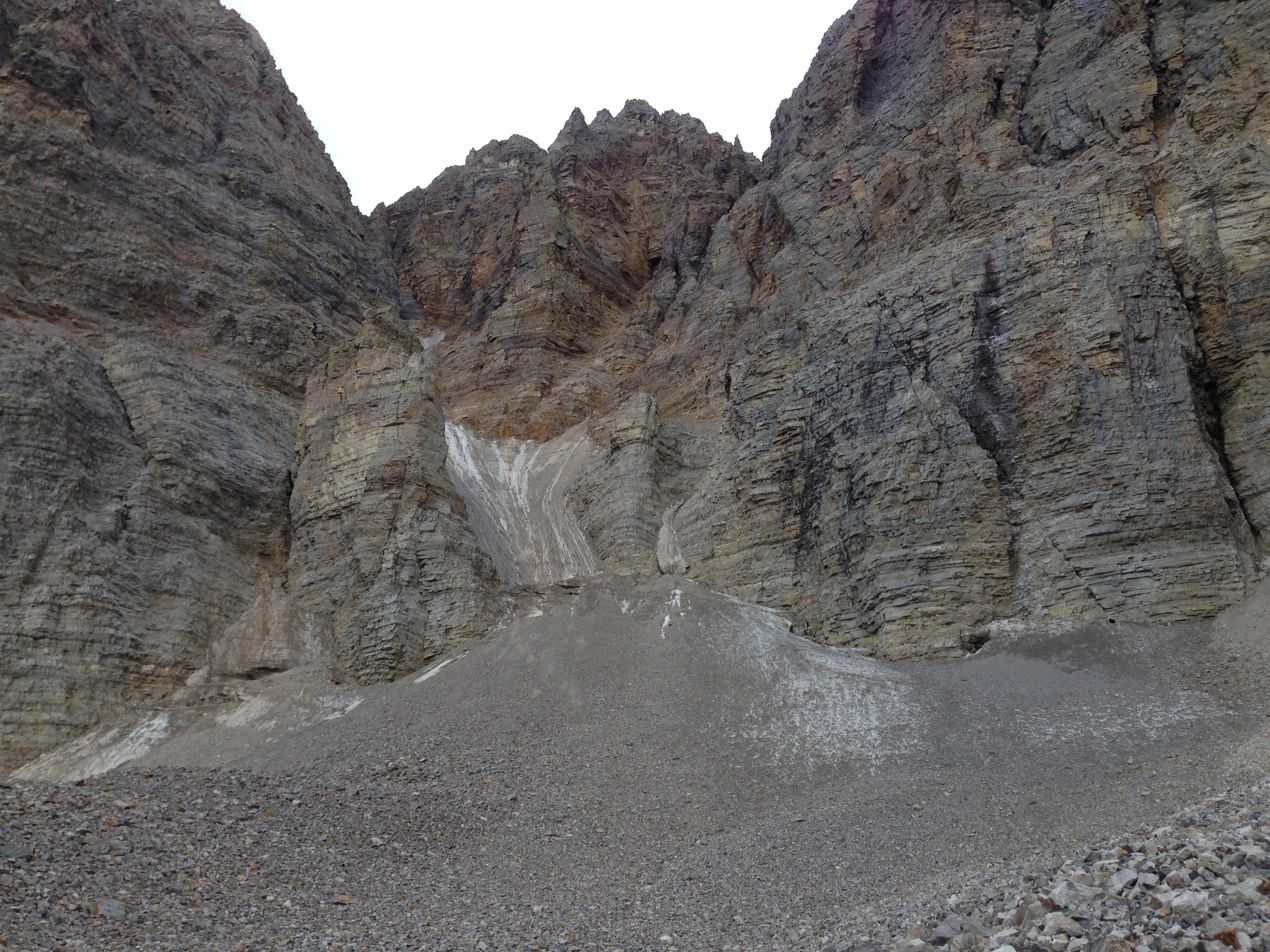
Wheeler Peak Glacier in Nevada

Basin and Range Province lies east of the Coast Ranges and west of the Rockies. There are no active glaciers in the Basin and Range Province and Wheeler Peak Glacier is considered by some to be a rock glacier.

- Wheeler Peak Glacier - Great Basin National Park

== Glaciers of the Rocky Mountains ==
=== Colorado ===
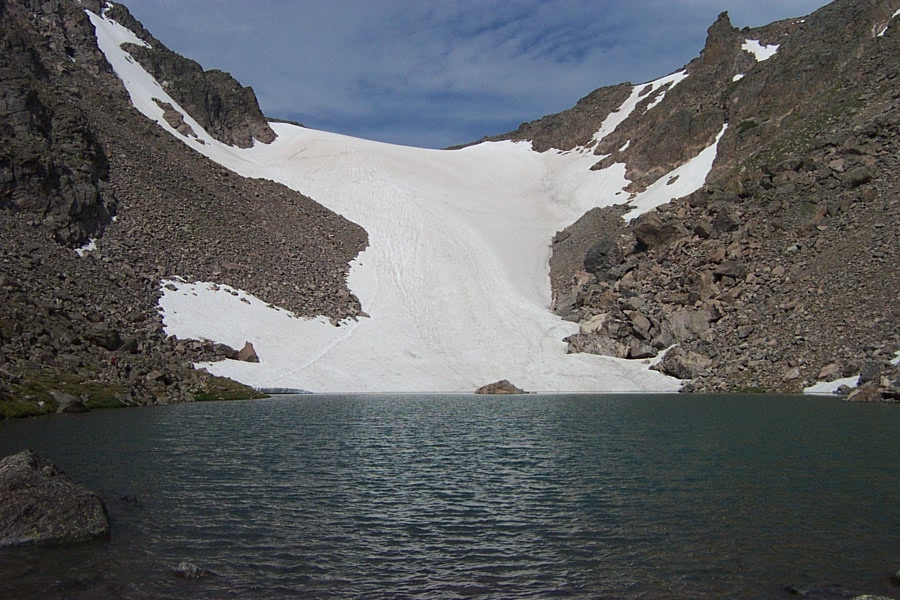
Andrews Glacier in Colorado

According to the Geographic Names Information System (GNIS), there are sixteen named glaciers in Colorado. According to early mountain explorers and scientists, Colorado once had more than eighteen glaciers before 1880.

- Andrews Glacier - Andrews Pass
- Arapaho Glacier - between North Arapaho and South Arapaho Peaks
- Arikaree Glacier - Between Arikaree Peak and Navajo Peak
- Blanca Glaciers - two extinct glaciers (N.& S. glacier) on Mt. Blanca. These glaciers were located at 37° 35N., longitude 105° 28W. at 12,000 feet in the Sangre de Cristo Mountain Range.
- Fair Glacier - Apache Peak
- Isabelle Glacier - Shoshone Peak
- Mills Glacier - Longs Peak, Rocky Mountain National Park
- Moomaw Glacier
- Navajo Glacier - North slope of Navajo Peak
- Peck Glacier
- Rowe Glacier
- Saint Mary's Glacier
- Saint Vrain Glaciers
- Sprague Glacier
- Taylor Glacier
- The Dove - north of Longs Peak
- Tyndall Glacier

See also Glaciers of Colorado See also

=== Idaho ===
- Borah glacier

=== Montana ===
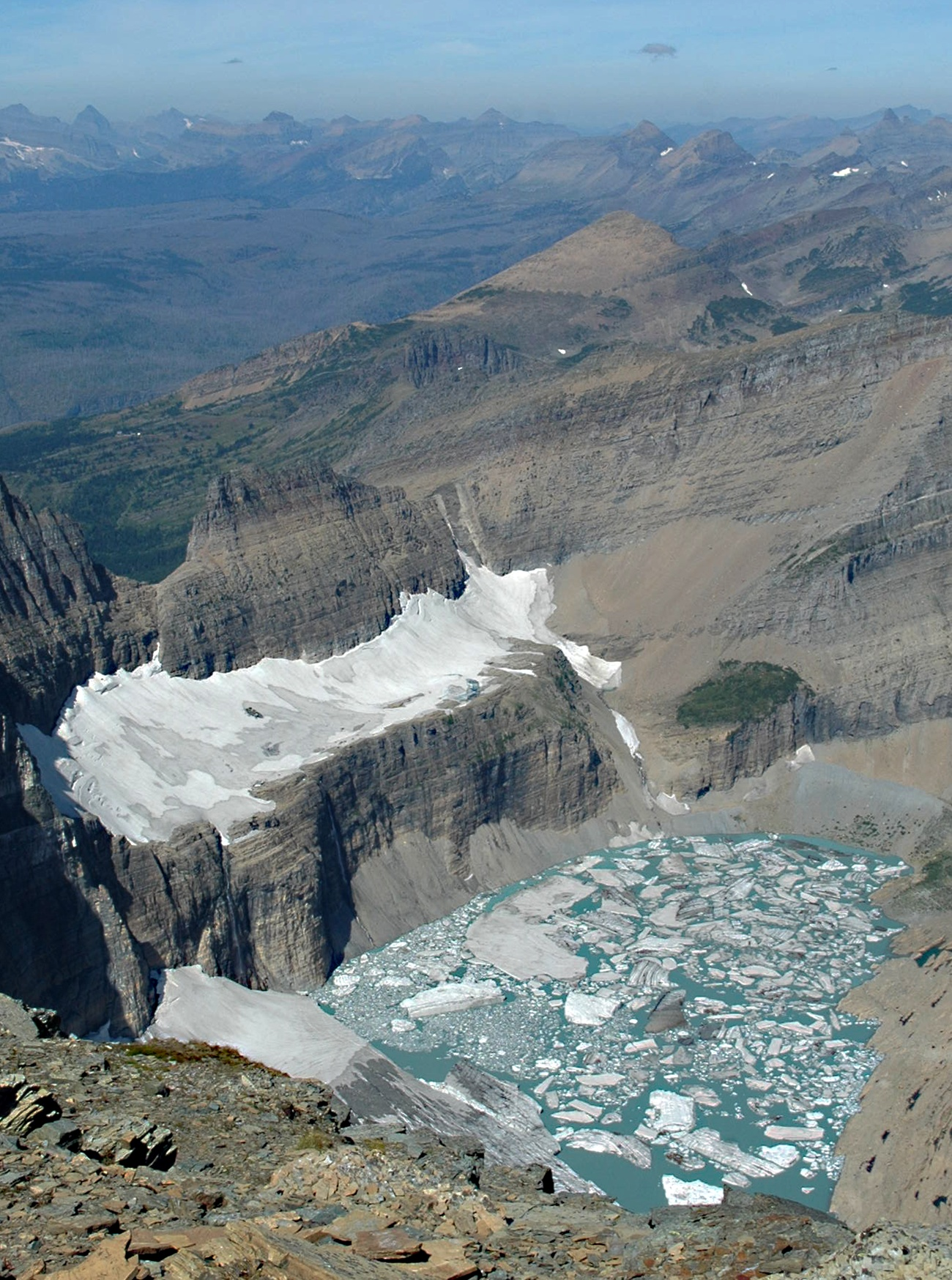
Grinnell Glacier with proglacial lake and The Salamander Glacier on high ledge

There are around 210 glaciers in Montana, with 60 named glaciers according to the Geographic Names Information System (GNIS).

- Agassiz Glacier - Glacier National Park (U.S.)
- Ahern Glacier - Glacier National Park
- Baby Glacier - Glacier National Park
- Beartooth Glacier - Beartooth Mountains
- Blackfoot Glacier - Glacier National Park
- Blackwell Glacier - Cabinet Mountains
- Boulder Glacier (Montana) - Glacier National Park
- Carter Glaciers - Glacier National Park
- Castle Rock Glacier - Beartooth Mountains
- Chaney Glacier - Glacier National Park
- Dixon Glacier - Glacier National Park
- Fissure Glacier - Mission Mountains
- Gem Glacier - Glacier National Park
- Granite Glacier - Beartooth Mountains
- Grant Glacier - Flathead National Forest
- Grasshopper Glacier - Beartooth Mountains
- Gray Wolf Glacier - Mission Mountains
- Grinnell Glacier - Glacier National Park
- Harris Glacier - Glacier National Park
- Harrison Glacier - Glacier National Park
- Herbst Glacier - Glacier National Park
- Hidden Glacier - Beartooth Mountains
- Hopper Glacier - Beartooth Mountains
- Hudson Glacier - Glacier National Park
- Ipasha Glacier - Glacier National Park
- Jackson Glacier - Glacier National Park
- Kintla Glacier - Glacier National Park
- Logan Glacier - Glacier National Park
- Lupfer Glacier - Glacier National Park
- McDonald Glacier - Mission Mountains
- Miche Wabun Glacier - Glacier National Park
- Mountaineer Glacier - Mission Mountains
- North Swiftcurrent Glacier - Glacier National Park
- Old Sun Glacier - Glacier National Park
- Phantom Glacier - Beartooth Mountains
- Piegan Glacier - Glacier National Park
- Pumpelly Glacier - Glacier National Park
- Pumpkin Glacier - Glacier National Park
- Rainbow Glacier - Glacier National Park
- Red Eagle Glacier - Glacier National Park
- Sexton Glacier - Glacier National Park
- Shepard Glacier - Glacier National Park
- Siyeh Glacier - Glacier National Park
- Sky Top Glacier - Beartooth Mountains
- Snowbank Glacier - Beartooth Mountains
- Sperry Glacier - Glacier National Park
- Stanton Glacier - Flathead National Forest
- Sundance Glacier - Beartooth Mountains
- Sunrise Glacier - Mission Mountains
- Swan Glaciers - Swan Range
- Swiftcurrent Glacier - Glacier National Park
- The Salamander Glacier - Glacier National Park
- Thunderbird Glacier - Glacier National Park
- Two Ocean Glacier - Glacier National Park
- Vulture Glacier (Montana) - Glacier National Park
- Weasel Collar Glacier - Glacier National Park
- Whitecrow Glacier - Glacier National Park
- Wolf Glacier - Beartooth Mountains

=== Utah ===
There are no visible glaciers in Utah. Timpanogos Glacier article is documentation of a buried glacier.

- Timpanogos Glacier - Wasatch Range

=== Wyoming ===
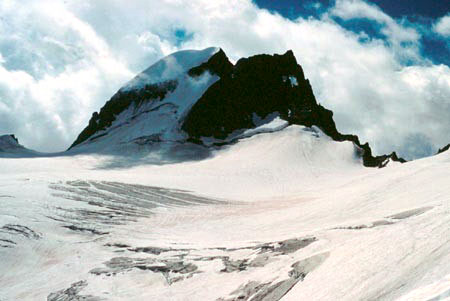
Gannett Glacier is the largest glacier in the American Rockies and is located in the remote Wind River Range, Wyoming.

There are around 105 glaciers in Wyoming, with 37 named glaciers according to the Geographic Names Information System (GNIS).

- American Legion Glacier - Wind River Range
- Baby Glacier - Wind River Range
- Bull Lake Glacier - Wind River Range
- Cloud Peak Glacier - Bighorn Mountains
- Connie Glacier - Wind River Range
- Continental Glacier - Wind River Range
- Dinwoody Glacier - Wind River Range
- Downs Glacier - Wind River Range
- Dry Creek Glacier - Wind River Range
- DuNoir Glacier - Absaroka Mountains
- East Torrey Glacier - Wind River Range
- Falling Ice Glacier - Teton Range
- Fishhawk Glacier - Absaroka Mountains
- Gannett Glacier - Wind River Range
- Gooseneck Glacier - Wind River Range
- Grasshopper Glacier - Wind River Range
- Harrower Glacier - Wind River Range
- Heap Steep Glacier - Wind River Range
- Helen Glacier - Wind River Range
- Hooker Glacier - Wind River Range
- J Glacier - Wind River Range
- Klondike Glacier - Wind River Range

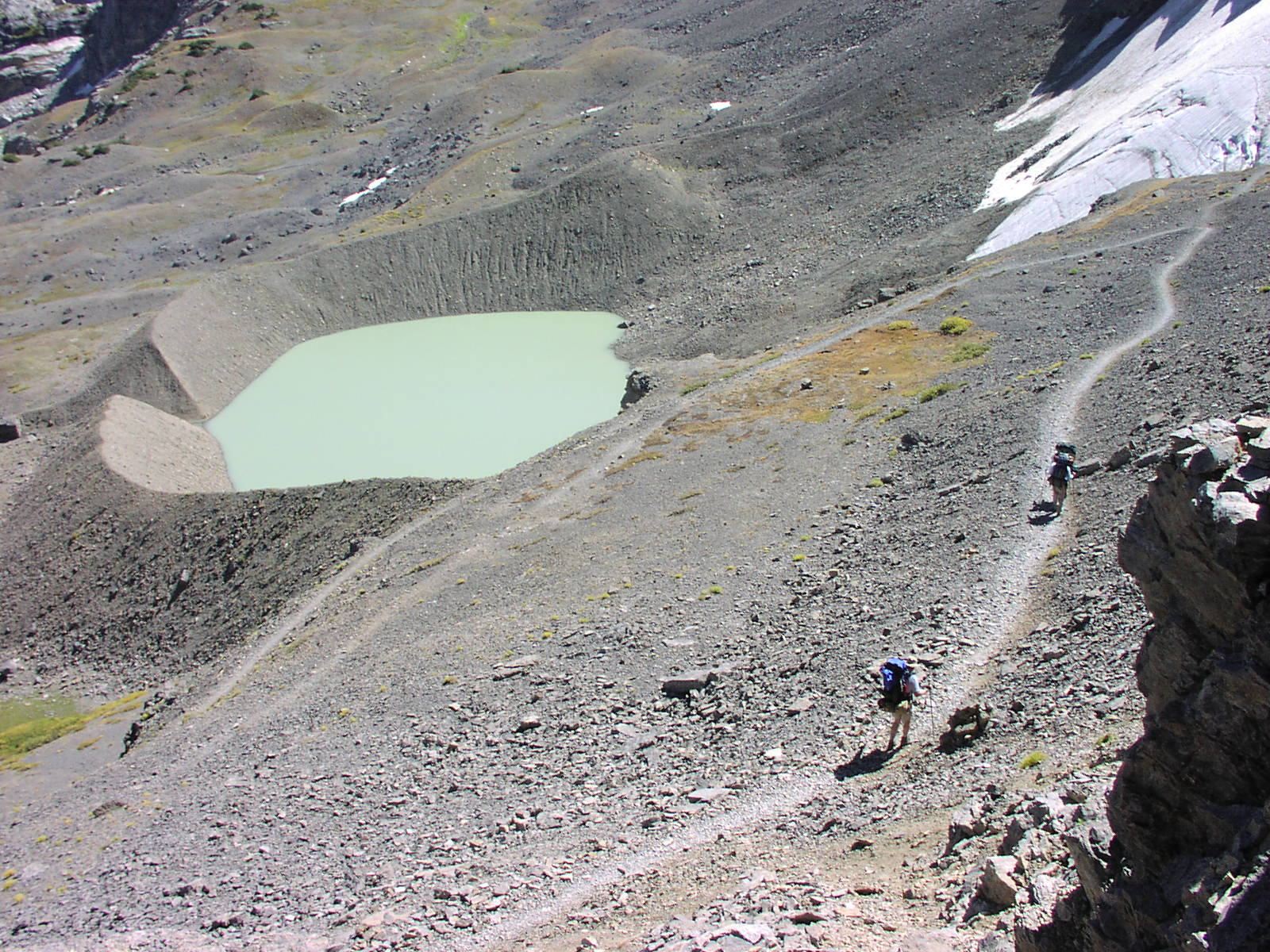
Hikers head towards Schoolroom Glacier at right while the terminal moraine and proglacial lake can be seen at left

- Knife Point Glacier - Wind River Range
- Lander Glacier - Wind River Range
- Lizard Head Glacier - Wind River Range
- Lower Fremont Glacier - Wind River Range
- Mammoth Glacier - Wind River Range
- Middle Teton Glacier - Teton Range
- Minor Glacier - Wind River Range
- Petersen Glacier - Teton Range
- Sacagawea Glacier - Wind River Range
- Schoolroom Glacier - Teton Range
- Skillet Glacier - Teton Range
- Sourdough Glacier - Wind River Range
- Sphinx Glacier - Wind River Range
- Stroud Glacier - Wind River Range
- Teepe Glacier - Teton Range
- Teton Glacier - Teton Range
- Tiny Glacier - Wind River Range
- Triple Glaciers - Teton Range
- Twins Glacier - Wind River Range
- Upper Fremont Glacier - Wind River Range
- Washakie Glacier - Wind River Range
- Wind River Glacier - Wind River Range

== See also ==
- List of glaciers
- List of Mount Hood glaciers
- List of glaciers in Wyoming

== Notes ==
^AReported in 2020 to have disappeared.
