= Moomaw =

Moomaw may refer to:

- Moomaw, Virginia, U.S.
- Moomaw Glacier, a glacier in Rocky Mountain National Park
- Lake Moomaw, a lake formed by the Gathright Dam on the Jackson River

== People ==
- Cephas B. Moomaw (1849–1915), American lawyer, judge, and politician
- Donn Moomaw (1931–2025), American football player and Presbyterian minister
- William Moomaw, American environmental policy professor
