= Peck Glacier =

Alpine glacier in Colorado, United States

- Location within Colorado
- Type: Mountain glacier
- Location: Grand County, Colorado, U.S.
- Coordinates: 40°03′35″N 105°39′56″W
- Terminus: Talus
- Status: Retreating

Peck Glacier is an alpine glacier in Roosevelt National Forest in the U.S. state of Colorado. Peck Glacier is .50 mi (0.80 km) northwest of Fair Glacier.

== See also ==
- List of glaciers in the United States
