= Skytop =

Skytop may refer to:

- Skytop, Pennsylvania
- Skytop, Syracuse, New York, a neighborhood
- Skytop, a rock climbing crag at Shawangunk Ridge located on Mohonk Preserve
- Skytop, an observation tower at Mohonk Mountain House
- Skytop Lodge, a resort in Pennsylvania, USA
- Skytop Lounge, an observation car built by the Chicago, Milwaukee, St. Paul and Pacific Railroad
- Sky-Top, a brand of sneaker made by Supra (footwear brand)
- Sky Top Glacier, in Montana, USA
