= Arikaree Glacier =

Alpine glacier in Colorado

- Location within Colorado
- Type: Mountain glacier
- Location: Boulder County, Colorado, United States
- Coordinates: 40°03′00″N 105°38′30″W
- Length: .10 mi (0.16 km) and .25 mi (0.40 km) wide
- Terminus: Talus
- Status: Retreating

Arikaree Glacier is an alpine glacier located in a cirque to the north of Arikaree Peak and south of Navajo Peak, in Roosevelt National Forest in the U.S. state of Colorado. The glacier is just east of the Continental Divide and 1 mi (1.6 km) south of Isabelle Glacier.

== See also ==
- List of glaciers in the United States
