= White Salmon Glacier =

White Salmon Glacier may refer to:

- White Salmon Glacier (Mount Adams), Mount Adams, Washington, United States
- White Salmon Glacier (Mount Shuksan), Mount Shuksan, North Cascades National Park, Washington, United States
