= Lillian Glacier =

Glacier in Washington, United States

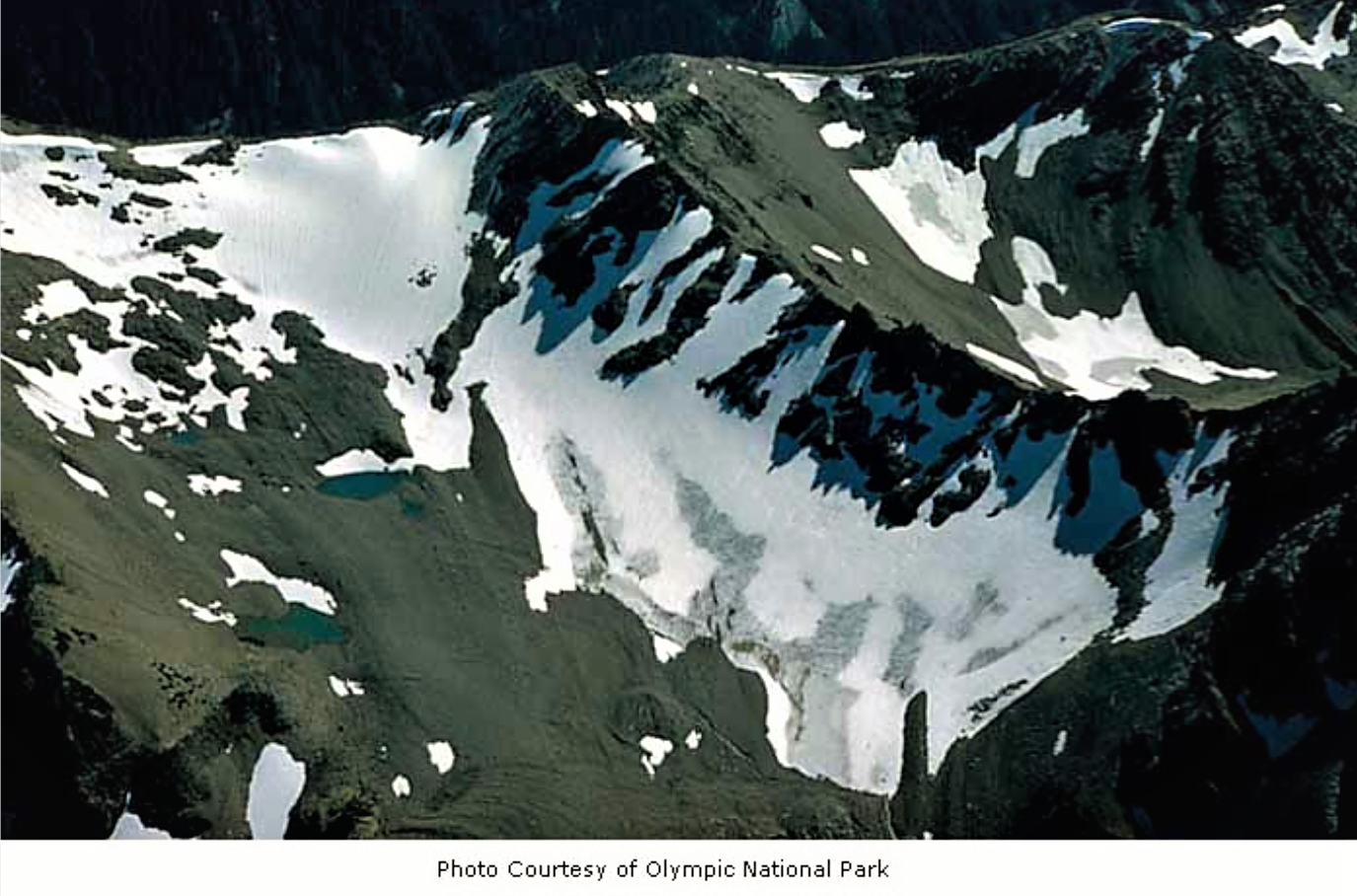
- Aerial view

- Location within Washington (state)
- Type: Mountain glacier
- Location: McCartney Peak, Olympic National Park, Jefferson County, Washington, USA
- Coordinates: 47°51′09″N 123°22′38″W
- Length: .04 mi (0.064 km)
- Terminus: Talus
- Status: Retreating/extinct

Lillian Glacier was located in the Olympic Mountains in Olympic National Park in the U.S. state of Washington. The remnants of the glacier are in a cirque below McCartney Peak. Between 1905 and 2010, the Lillian Glacier melted away most likely because of global warming.

== See also ==
- List of glaciers in the United States
