= No Name Glacier =

Glacier in Washington, United States

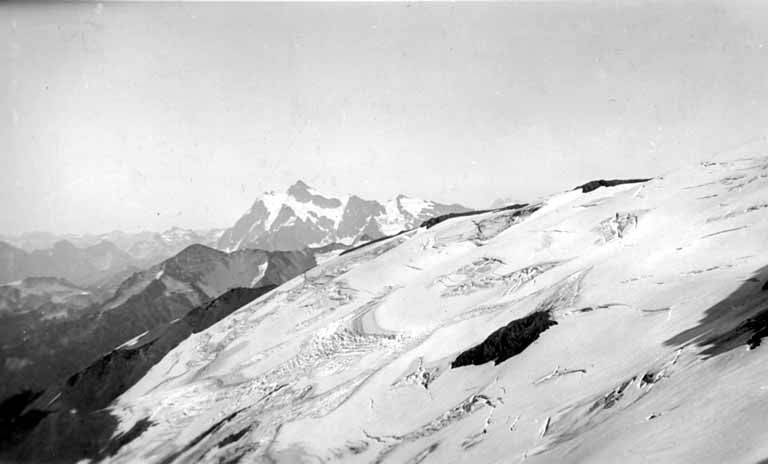
- c. 1913

- Location within Washington (state)
- Type: Mountain glacier
- Location: Whatcom County, Washington, USA
- Coordinates: 48°48′19″N 121°49′35″W
- Length: .20 mi (0.32 km)
- Terminus: Moraine/talus
- Status: Retreating

No Name Glacier is located on Mount Baker in the North Cascades of the U.S. state of Washington. The glacier is between Mazama and Bastile Glaciers, a half mile south of Hadley Peak. No Name Glacier feeds Dobbs Creek, which flows into Wells Creek.

== History ==
No Name Glacier was discovered by W. H. Dorr in 1886 during an expedition prospecting for gold, and was later explored by B. B. Dobbs in 1892, and then named by Henry C. Engberg in 1911.

Glaciers on Mount Baker underwent a period of rapid recession during the early 20th century, recovering between the 1940s and 1970s before once again receding. In 2023, a paper was published with the finding that No Name Glacier had split apart into five pieces.

== See also ==
- List of glaciers in the United States
