= Hooker Glacier =

Hooker Glacier may refer to:

- Hooker Glacier (Antarctica)
- Hooker Glacier (New Zealand) in New Zealand
- Hooker Glacier (Wyoming) in Wyoming, USA
