= White River Glacier (Oregon) =

Glacier on Mount Hood, Oregon, United States

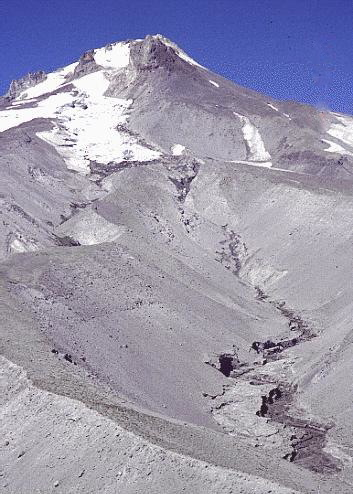
- The glacier melting in late summer

- Location within Oregon
- Type: Mountain glacier
- Location: Hood River County, Oregon, United States
- Coordinates: 45°21′26″N 121°41′55″W
- Area: 101 acres (41 ha) (2004 estimate)
- Terminus: Ice fall
- Status: Retreating

White River Glacier is an alpine glacier located on the south slopes of Mount Hood in the U.S. state of Oregon. It ranges in elevation from about 10,000 to 6,200 feet (3,000 to 1,900 m). It is among the best known of the twelve glaciers on the mountain, and the lower reaches are a popular destination for Nordic skiing enthusiasts. The glacier is the source of the White River, a tributary of the Deschutes River, and has a long history of washing out the bridge where Oregon Route 35 crosses at 45.30307°N 121.67208°W.

The glacier is a remnant of the massive glaciers that formed during the last ice age and have created White River Canyon. The canyon divides the two largest ski areas on Mount Hood, and is easily seen from many areas of Timberline Lodge ski area, and from the upper southern runs of Mount Hood Meadows. The glacier is bounded on the east by a ridge shared with Newton Clark Glacier and on the west by a ridge shared with Palmer Glacier. The upper glacier forms at the base of Steel Cliff to the east of an area known as Triangle Moraine. The glacier lies almost entirely within Mount Hood Wilderness.

The western edge of the canyon is extremely steep and in times of low visibility causes descending mountain climbers on the South Route (through Palmer Glacier to Timberline Lodge) to veer excessively to the west to avoid the possibility of entering the canyon. This has resulted in numerous search and rescue operations near or in Zigzag Canyon, west of Palmer Glacier. (See Mount Hood climbing accidents.)

Jökulhlaups originating from White River Glacier occurred in 1926, 1931, 1946, 1949, 1959, and 1968. These washed out Highway 35 (or its predecessor) each time. An increase of outbursts from White River Glacier may be related to increasing temperatures and the size of the fumarole field at the glacier's head at Crater Rock. The White River Glacier has decreased in area by 61% between 1907 and 2004. The glacier terminus has retreated 510 metres (1,670 ft) over the same time period.

== See also ==
- List of glaciers in the United States
