= Sitkum Glacier =

Glacier in Washington, United States

Scimitar Glacier
- Location within Washington (state)
- Type: Mountain glacier
- Location: Glacier Peak, Snohomish County, Washington, USA
- Coordinates: 48°06′29″N 121°07′49″W
- Length: .9 mi (1.4 km)
- Terminus: Barren rock
- Status: Retreating

Sitkum Glacier is located on the west slopes of Glacier Peak in the U.S. state of Washington. As is true with all the glaciers found on Glacier Peak, Sitkum Glacier is retreating. Sitkum Glacier is immediately south of Scimitar Glacier.

== See also ==
- List of glaciers in the United States
