= Navajo Glacier =

Alpine glacier in Colorado

- Location within Colorado
- Type: Mountain glacier
- Location: Boulder County, Colorado, United States
- Coordinates: 40°03′21″N 105°38′47″W
- Terminus: Talus
- Status: Retreating

Navajo Glacier is an alpine glacier in Roosevelt National Forest in the U.S. state of Colorado. Navajo Glacier is on the north slope of Navajo Peak and about .40 mi (0.64 km) south of Isabelle Glacier.

== See also ==
- List of glaciers in the United States
