= Saint Vrain =

Saint Veranus of Cavaillon (died c. 590) was a French bishop.

Saint Vrain, Saint-Vrain or St. Vrain may also refer to:

== People ==
- Ceran St. Vrain (1802–1870), American fur trader of French descent
- Felix St. Vrain (1790–1832), United States Indian agent of French descent
- Jim St. Vrain (1871–1937), American baseball player

== Places ==
=== France ===
- Saint-Véran, a commune in the Hautes-Alpes department
- Saint-Vrain, Marne, a commune of the Champagne-Ardenne region
- Saint-Vrain, Essonne, a commune of the Île-de-France region

=== United States ===
- Fort Saint Vrain, a 19th-century fur trading post in Colorado
- Saint Vrain Glaciers, a series of glaciers in the Rocky Mountains of Colorado
- St. Vrain Creek, Colorado
- St. Vrain State Park, Colorado
- St. Vrain Valley School District in Longmont, Colorado
- St. Vrain, Colorado, a ghost town in Weld County, Colorado
- St. Vrain, New Mexico
- St. Vrain's County, Jefferson Territory, later part of Colorado

== See also ==
- St. Vrains, Colorado
