= Dusty Glacier =

Glacier in Washington, United States

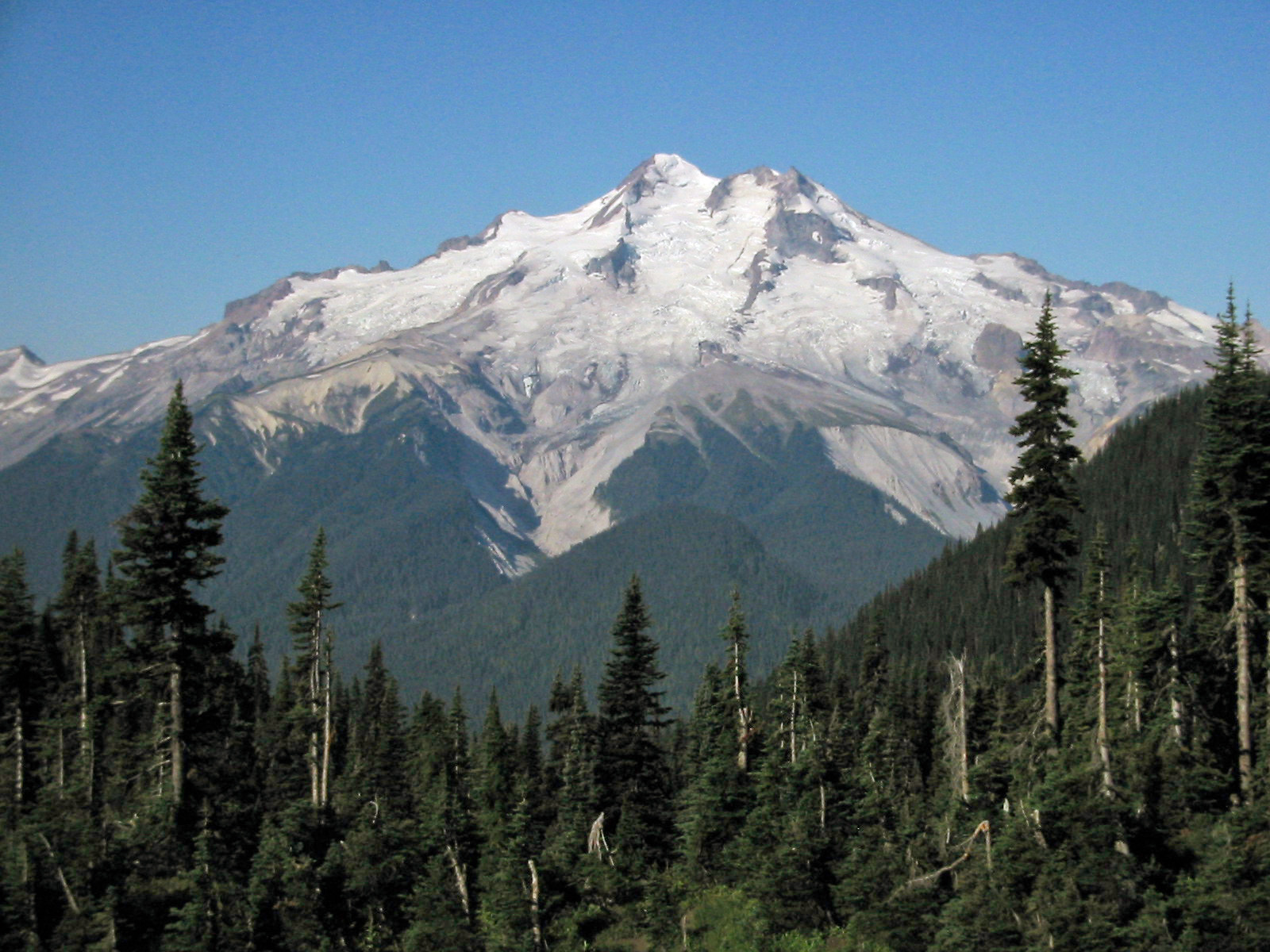
- Left to right, Cool, Chocolate, North Guardian and Dusty Glaciers on the east slopes of Glacier Peak

- Location within Washington (state)
- Type: Mountain glacier
- Location: Glacier Peak, Snohomish County, Washington, USA
- Coordinates: 48°07′24″N 121°06′14″W
- Length: 1.4 mi (2.3 km)
- Terminus: Ice fall
- Status: Retreating

Dusty Glacier is located on northeast slopes of Glacier Peak in the U.S. state of Washington. The glacier descends from 9,022 ft (2,750 m) to 6,430 ft (1,960 m) and in places along its length is connected to North Guardian Glacier which lies to its south and Ermine Glacier to the north. As is true with all the glaciers found on Glacier Peak, Dusty Glacier is retreating. During the Little Ice Age, Dusty Glacier extended down to an altitude of 4,800 ft (1,500 m), but since approximately the year 1850, the glacier has been in a general state of retreat and has lost more than 1,500 m (4,900 ft) of its length. Dusty Glacier is heavily crevassed and the glacier ends in an ice fall at its terminus.

== See also ==
- List of glaciers in the United States
