= Langille =

Langille may refer to:

== People ==
- Bill Langille (1944–2020), Canadian politician
- Carole Glasser Langille (born 1952), Canadian poet
- Edward Langille (born 1959), university professor
- James A. Langille (1909–1979), Canadian politician

== Other ==
- Bernie Langille Wants to Know What Happened to Bernie Langille, 2022 documentary film
- Langille Glacier, on Mount Hood in Oregon
- Langille Peak, a mountain in California
