= Sunrise Glacier =

Sunrise Glacier could mean:

- Sunrise Glacier (Alaska), a glacier of the Alaska Range
- Sunrise Glacier (Montana), a glacier of the Mission Mountains of Montana
