= Hanging Glacier =

Hanging Glacier may refer to:

- Hanging glacier, generic term for a type of glacier
- Hanging Glacier (Jefferson County, Washington)
- Hanging Glacier (Mount Shuksan)
