= Dark Glacier =

Glacier in the state of Washington

- Location within Washington (state)
- Type: Alpine glacier
- Location: Snohomish County, Washington, U.S.
- Coordinates: 48°15′32″N 120°53′02″W
- Length: .50 mi (0.80 km)
- Terminus: Barren rock
- Status: Retreating

Dark Glacier is in Wenatchee National Forest in the U.S. state of Washington, 1.5 mi (2.4 km) northwest of Bonanza Peak, the tallest non-volcanic peak in the Cascade Range. Dark Glacier descends from 8,200 to 6,800 ft (2,500 to 2,100 m).

== See also ==
- List of glaciers in the United States
