= Ice River Glacier =

Glacier in Washington, United States

- Location within Washington (state)
- Type: Mountain glacier
- Location: North of Mount Olympus, Olympic National Park, Jefferson County, Washington, USA
- Coordinates: 47°49′27″N 123°40′07″W
- Length: .35 mi (0.56 km)
- Terminus: Icefall

Ice River Glacier is located 2.4 miles (3.9 km) northeast of Mount Olympus in the Olympic Mountains of Olympic National Park in the U.S. state of Washington. Starting at an elevation of 6,400 feet (2,000 m) on the northern slope of a subpeak of Mount Olympus known as Mercury (6,950 ft (2,118 m)), the glacier flows northwest as it descends. The glacier reaches as low as 5,200 ft (1,600 m) before terminating. Though the glacier lies adjacent to the much larger Blue Glacier, an arête separates the two glaciers.

== See also ==
- List of glaciers in the United States
