= So-Bahli-Alhi Glacier =

Glacier in Washington, United States

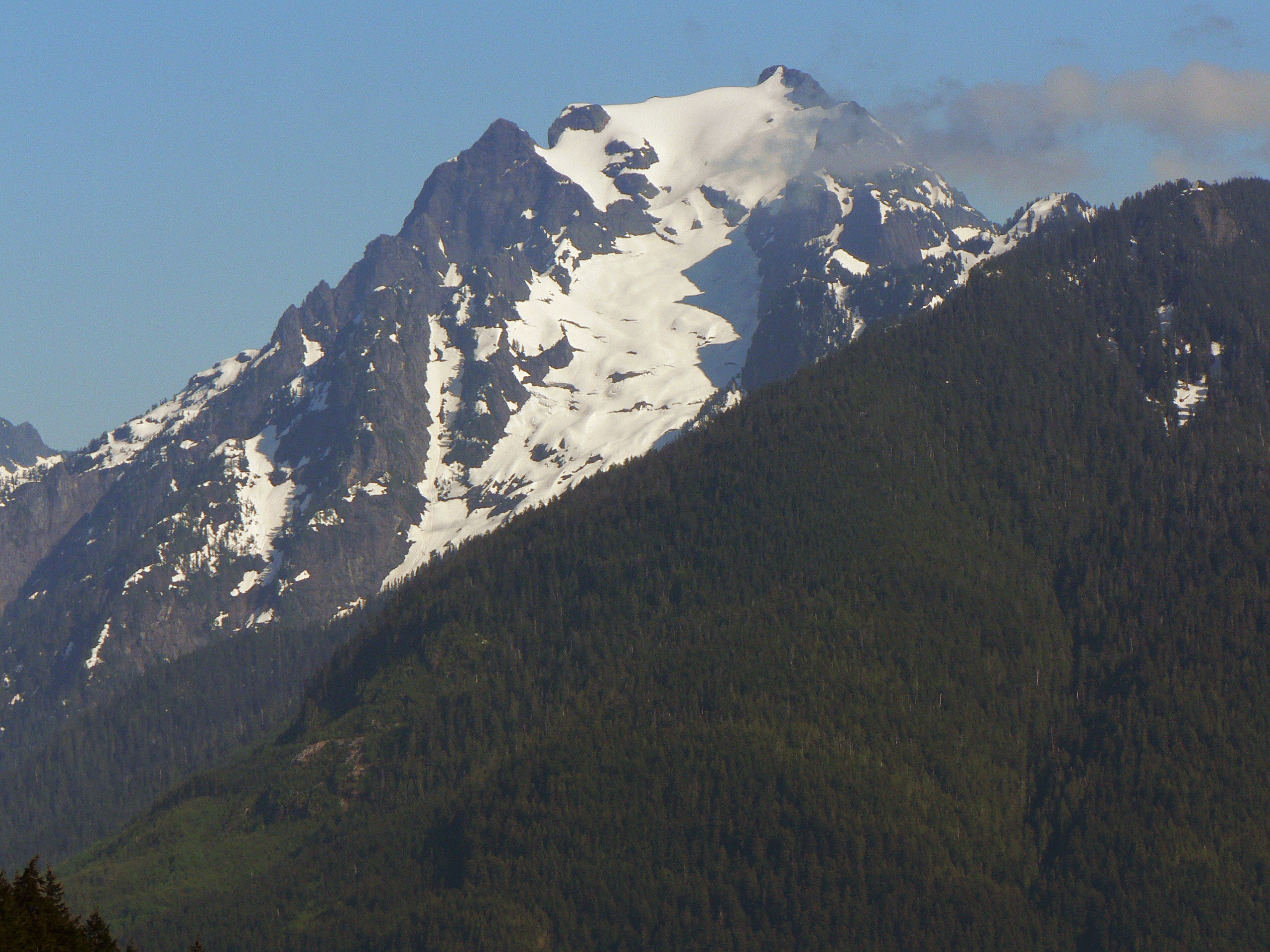
- So-Bahli-Alhi Glacier on the northwest slopes of Whitehorse Mountain

- Location within Washington (state)
- Type: Cirque glacier
- Location: Snohomish County, Washington, U.S.
- Coordinates: 48°12′48″N 121°40′56″W
- Length: .40 mi (0.64 km)
- Terminus: Barren rock
- Status: Retreating

So-Bahli-Alhi Glacier is in Snoqualmie National Forest in the U.S. state of Washington, on the north slopes of Whitehorse Mountain. Meaning lofty lady from the east in Native American language, So-Bahli-Alhi Glacier is along a climbing route to the summit of Whitehorse Mountain.

== See also ==
- List of glaciers in the United States
