= Tiny Glacier =

Glacier in Wyoming, United States

- Location within Wyoming
- Type: Mountain glacier
- Location: Sublette County, Wyoming, USA
- Coordinates: 43°03′13″N 109°33′56″W
- Length: .10 mi (0.16 km)
- Terminus: Talus
- Status: Retreating

Tiny Glacier is located in the Wind River Range, Bridger-Teton National Forest, in the U.S. state of Wyoming. The glacier is situated in a north-facing cirque immediately west of the Continental Divide.

== See also ==
- List of glaciers in the United States
