= Wyeth Glacier =

Glacier in the state of Washington

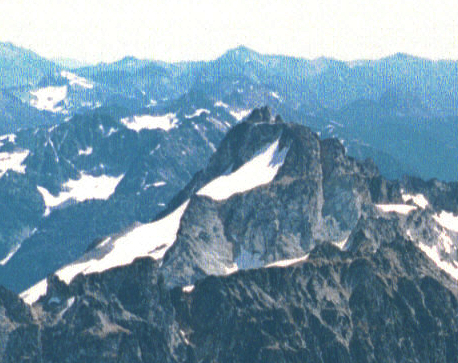
- Wyeth Glacier in the cirque of Storm King, photographed in 1997

- Location within Washington (state)
- Type: Mountain glacier
- Location: Chelan County, Washington, U.S.
- Coordinates: 48°29′40″N 120°56′21″W
- Length: .50 mi (0.80 km)
- Terminus: Barren rock/icefall
- Status: Retreating

Wyeth Glacier is in North Cascades National Park in the U.S. state of Washington, in a cirque to the west and north of Storm King, a peak 1 mi (1.6 km) northwest of Goode Mountain. Wyeth Glacier is broken into several sections descending from 8,000 to 6,600 ft (2,400 to 2,000 m).

== See also ==
- List of glaciers in the United States
