= Petersen Glacier =

Glacier in Wyoming, United States

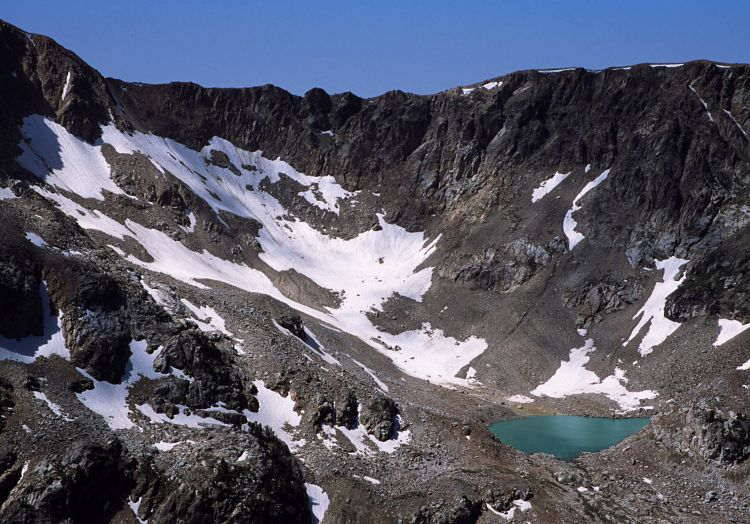
- Mica Lake and Petersen Glacier

- Location within Wyoming
- Type: Mountain glacier
- Location: Grand Teton National Park, Teton County, Wyoming, USA
- Coordinates: 43°46′44″N 110°50′50″W
- Terminus: moraine
- Status: unknown

Petersen Glacier is in Grand Teton National Park, Wyoming, United States. The glacier is in a cirque to the west and above north Cascade Canyon at an altitude of approximately 10,000 feet (3,000 m). The glacier is named after Frank Petersen, one of the first mountaineers to climb Grand Teton in 1898. Runoff from the glacier is heavy in rock flour (glacial silt) which turns the waters of Mica Lake turquoise in appearance. The glacier is no longer visible in satellite imagery, indicating it may have disappeared. All of the existing glaciers in Grand Teton National Park were created during the Little Ice Age (1350-1850) and have been in a general state of retreat since the mid-19th century.

== See also ==
- List of glaciers in the United States
- Geology of the Grand Teton area
