= Glisan Glacier =

Glacier located on Mount Hood, Oregon, United States

- Location within Oregon
- Type: Mountain glacier
- Location: Hood River County, Oregon, United States
- Coordinates: 45°23′27″N 121°43′10″W
- Terminus: Barren rock
- Status: Retreating

Glisan Glacier was an alpine glacier located on the northwest slope of Mount Hood in the US state of Oregon. It had an average altitude of 7,500 feet (2,300 m), but is no longer considered to be a glacier.

== See also ==
- List of glaciers in the United States
