= Mountaineer Glacier =

Glacier in Montana, United States

- Location within Montana
- Type: Mountain glacier
- Location: Mission Mountains, Missoula County, Montana, U.S.
- Coordinates: 47°20′33″N 113°52′47″W
- Area: Approximately 15 acres (0.061 km^{2})
- Terminus: Talus
- Status: Unknown

Mountaineer Glacier is in the U.S. state of Montana. The glacier is situated in the Mission Mountains at an elevation of 8,200 feet (2,500 m) above sea level and is north of Mountaineer Peak. The glacier covers approximately 15 acres (0.061 km^{2}).

== See also ==
- List of glaciers in the United States
