= Fishhawk Glacier =

Glacier in Wyoming, United States

- Location within Wyoming
- Type: Mountain glacier
- Location: Park County, Wyoming, USA
- Coordinates: 44°15′40″N 109°51′58″W
- Length: .4 miles (0.64 km)
- Terminus: Talus
- Status: Unknown

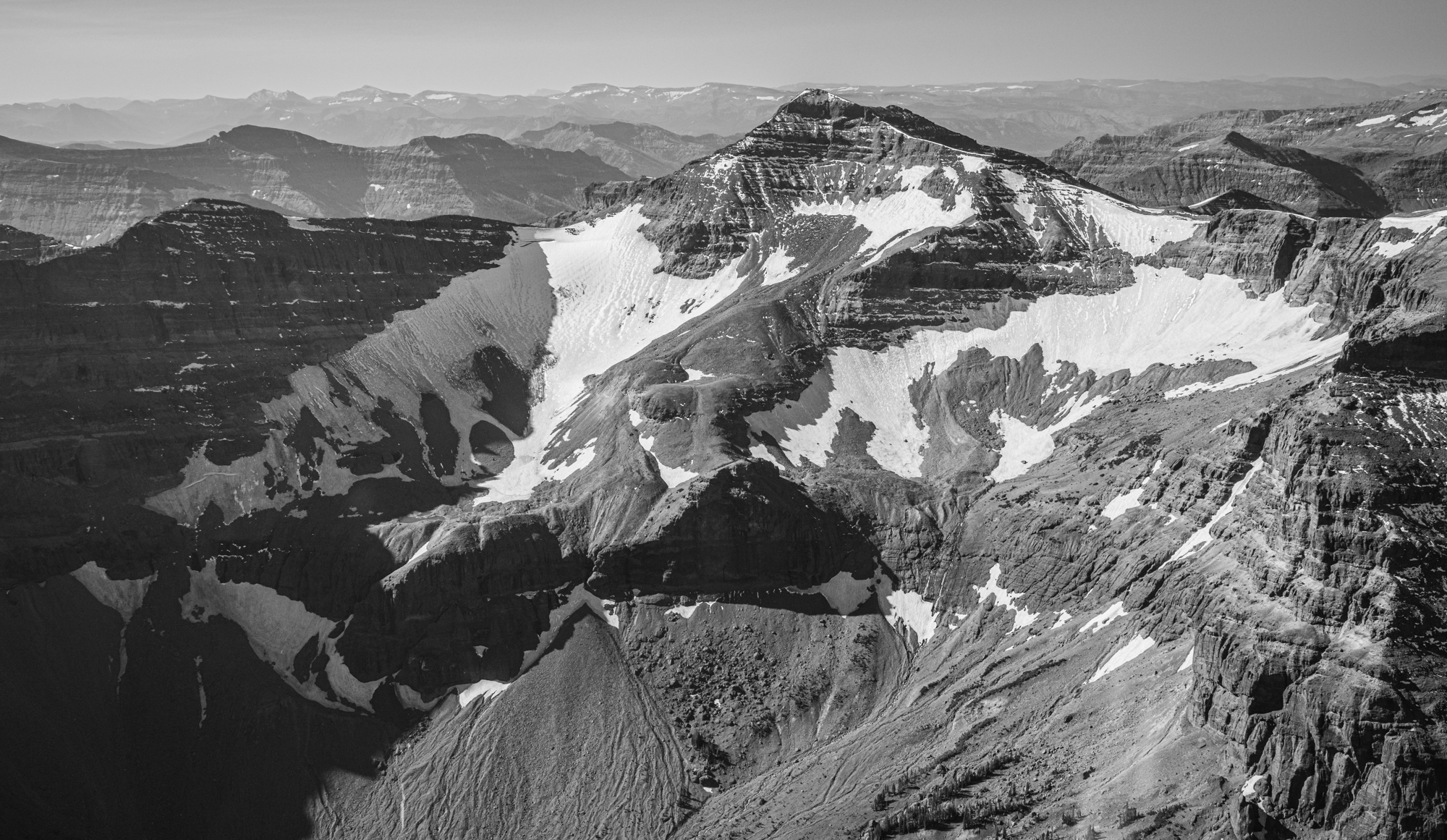

Fishhawk Glacier is located in the Absaroka Range, Shoshone National Forest, in the U.S. state of Wyoming. The glacier is situated on the northeast slope of Overlook Mountain (11,869 feet (3,618 m)) and is one of but a few glaciers that can be found in the Absaroka Range.

== See also ==
- List of glaciers in the United States
