= Twins Glacier =

Glacier in the state of Wyoming

- Location within Wyoming
- Type: Mountain glacier
- Location: Sublette County, Wyoming, USA
- Coordinates: 43°08′59″N 109°39′15″W
- Length: .25 mi (0.40 km)
- Terminus: talus
- Status: retreating

Twins Glacier is west of the Continental Divide in the northern Wind River Range in the U.S. state of Wyoming. The glacier is located in the Bridger Wilderness of Bridger-Teton National Forest, and is among the largest grouping of glaciers in the American Rocky Mountains. The glacier is situated in a northeast facing cirque, below the summit of Winifred Peak.

== See also ==
- List of glaciers in the United States
