= Granite Glacier =

Glacier in Montana, United States

- Location within Montana
- Type: Mountain glacier
- Location: Beartooth Mountains, Park County, Montana, U.S.
- Coordinates: 45°10′12″N 109°48′22″W
- Area: Approximately 40 acres (0.16 km^{2})
- Terminus: Barren rock
- Status: Unknown

Granite Glacier is located in the US state of Montana. The glacier is situated in the Beartooth Mountains at an elevation of 11,000 feet (3,400 m) above sea level and is on the north slope of Granite Peak, the highest summit in Montana. The glacier covers approximately 40 acres (0.16 km^{2}).

== See also ==
- List of glaciers in the United States
