= Dry Creek Glacier =

Glacier in Wyoming, United States

- Location within Wyoming
- Type: Mountain glacier
- Location: Fremont County, Wyoming, USA
- Coordinates: 43°10′38″N 109°30′30″W
- Area: 70 acres (28 ha)
- Length: .35 mi (0.56 km)
- Width: .35 mi (0.56 km)
- Terminus: Proglacial lake
- Status: Unknown

Dry Creek Glacier is located in Shoshone National Forest, in the U.S. state of Wyoming on Dry Creek Ridge, a high altitude plateau to the east of the main summits of the Wind River Range. The toe of the glacier has an unnamed proglacial lake, and the glacier has a moderate slope which descends from 12,320 to 11,800 ft (3,760 to 3,600 m).

== Climate ==
Climate data for Dry Creek Ridge 43.1684 N, 109.5035 W, Elevation: 12,618 ft (3,846 m) (1991–2020 normals)
Month	Jan	Feb	Mar	Apr	May	Jun	Jul	Aug	Sep	Oct	Nov	Dec	Year
Mean daily maximum °F (°C)	18.7 (−7.4)	18.4 (−7.6)	24.2 (−4.3)	29.6 (−1.3)	38.3 (3.5)	48.8 (9.3)	58.3 (14.6)	57.1 (13.9)	48.5 (9.2)	36.5 (2.5)	24.6 (−4.1)	18.2 (−7.7)	35.1 (1.7)
Daily mean °F (°C)	10.0 (−12.2)	9.0 (−12.8)	14.0 (−10.0)	18.9 (−7.3)	27.5 (−2.5)	37.5 (3.1)	45.8 (7.7)	44.7 (7.1)	36.9 (2.7)	26.2 (−3.2)	15.9 (−8.9)	9.6 (−12.4)	24.7 (−4.1)
Mean daily minimum °F (°C)	1.3 (−17.1)	−0.3 (−17.9)	3.8 (−15.7)	8.2 (−13.2)	16.8 (−8.4)	26.2 (−3.2)	33.4 (0.8)	32.3 (0.2)	25.4 (−3.7)	15.9 (−8.9)	7.3 (−13.7)	1.0 (−17.2)	14.3 (−9.8)
Average precipitation inches (mm)	2.42 (61)	2.78 (71)	2.28 (58)	4.78 (121)	4.11 (104)	2.53 (64)	1.38 (35)	1.14 (29)	2.10 (53)	2.31 (59)	2.80 (71)	2.97 (75)	31.6 (801)
Source: PRISM Climate Group

== See also ==
- List of glaciers in the United States
