= Connie Glacier =

Glacier in Wyoming, US

- Location within Wyoming
- Type: Mountain glacier
- Location: Sublette County, Wyoming, US
- Coordinates: 43°16′07″N 109°41′37″W
- Area: 105 acres (42 ha)
- Length: .55 miles (0.89 km)
- Width: .30 mi (0.48 km)
- Terminus: Proglacial lake
- Status: unknown

Connie Glacier is in Bridger–Teton National Forest, in the U.S. state of Wyoming on the west of the Continental Divide in the Wind River Range. Connie Glacier is in the Bridger Wilderness, and is part of the largest grouping of glaciers in the American Rocky Mountains. The glacier is situated in a cirque on the north slope of Yukon Peak and terminates in a proglacial lake.

== See also ==
- List of glaciers in the United States
