= Phantom Glacier =

Glacier in Montana, United States

- Location within Montana
- Type: Mountain glacier
- Location: Beartooth Mountains, Carbon County, Montana, U.S.
- Coordinates: 45°09′15″N 109°44′40″W
- Terminus: Talus
- Status: Unknown

Phantom Glacier is in the U.S. state of Montana. The glacier is situated in the Beartooth Mountains at an elevation of 10,400 feet (3,200 m) above sea level and is immediately south of Arch Lake.

== See also ==
- List of glaciers in the United States
