= Flett Glacier =

Glacier in Washington, United States

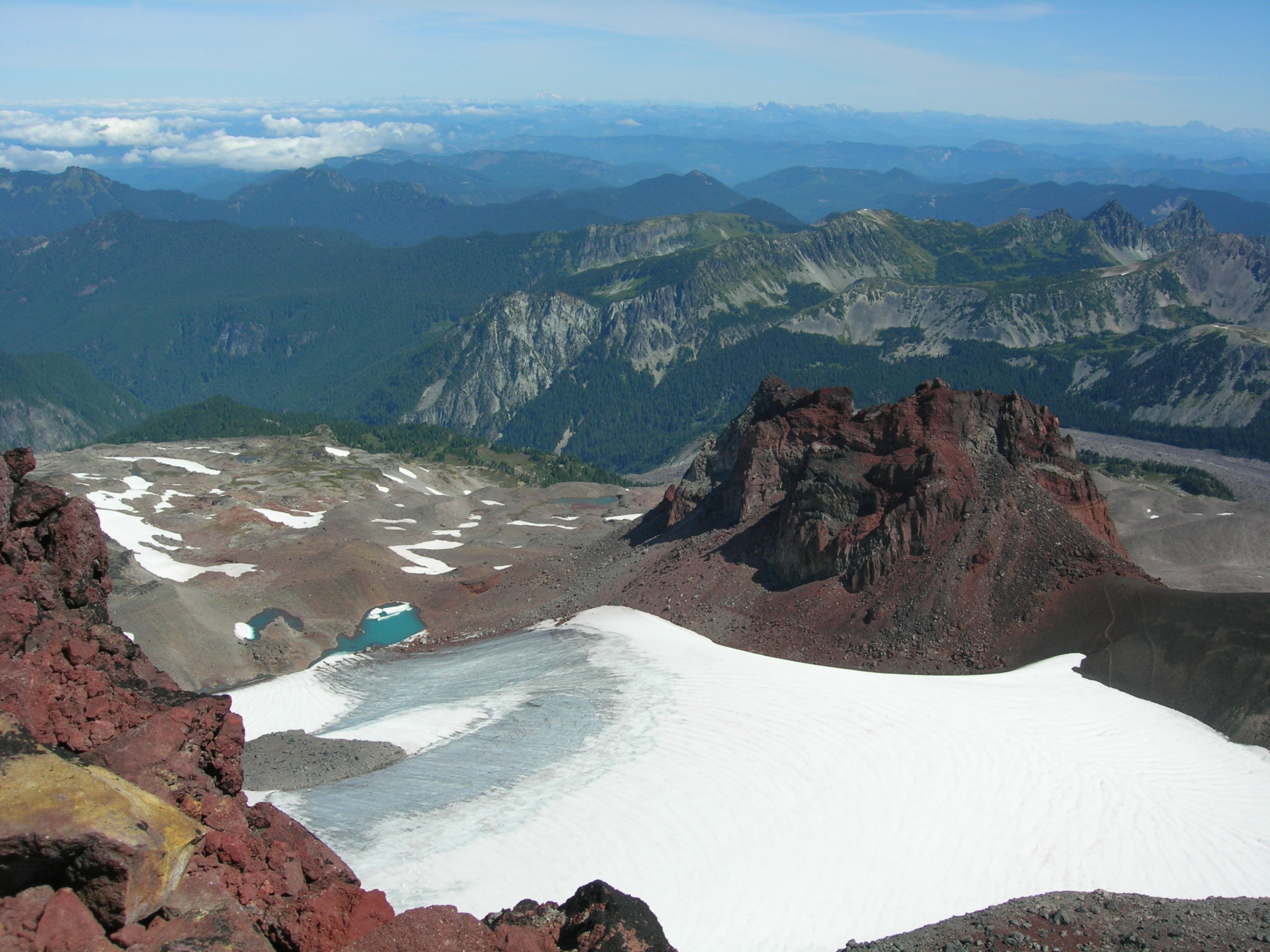
- Flett Glacier viewed from Observation Rock, with Echo Rock in the distance.

- Location within Washington (state)
- Type: Mountain glacier
- Location: Mount Rainier National Park, Pierce County, Washington, USA
- Coordinates: 46°54′22″N 121°48′08″W
- Length: .35 mi (0.56 km)
- Terminus: Moraines/proglacial lake
- Status: Retreating

Flett Glacier refers to two glaciers on the northwestern flank of Mount Rainier in the U.S. state of Washington. The glaciers lie on a subsidiary peak of Rainier, the 8,364 feet (2,549 m) Observation Rock. There are two sections of glacial ice, an eastern lobe at about 7,600 ft (2,300 m) to 7,300 ft (2,200 m) in elevation, a smaller western lobe at about 7,200 ft (2,200 m) in elevation. Meltwater from the glacier flows into the Puyallup River.

Flett Glacier commemorates the botanist John B. Flett, who climbed Little Tahoma in 1895.

== See also ==
- List of glaciers in the United States
