= Blackwell Glacier =

Glacier in Montana, United States

- Location within Montana
- Type: Mountain glacier
- Location: Cabinet Mountains, Lincoln County, Montana, U.S.
- Coordinates: 48°13′47″N 115°41′07″W
- Terminus: Barren rock
- Status: Unknown

Blackwell Glacier is in the U.S. state of Montana. The glacier is situated immediately north of Snowshoe Peak in the Cabinet Mountains. The glacier consists of numerous small ice patches.

== See also ==
- List of glaciers in the United States
