= Ptarmigan Glacier =

Glacier in Washington, United States

- Location within Washington (state)
- Type: Mountain glacier
- Location: Glacier Peak, Snohomish County, Washington, USA
- Coordinates: 48°08′08″N 121°07′38″W
- Length: .60 mi (0.97 km)
- Terminus: Talus
- Status: Retreating

Ptarmigan Glacier is located on north slopes of Glacier Peak in the U.S. state of Washington. As is true with all the glaciers found on Glacier Peak, Ptarmigan Glacier is retreating. During the Little Ice Age, Ptarmigan Glacier extended down to an altitude of 4,444 ft (1,355 m) but aside from a small advance during the 1970s, has retreated significantly since the end of the Little Ice Age.

== See also ==
- List of glaciers in the United States
