= Swan Glaciers =

Glaciers in Montana, United States

- Location within Montana
- Type: Mountain glacier
- Location: Swan Range, Flathead County, Montana, U.S.
- Coordinates: 47°43′31″N 113°38′28″W
- Terminus: Barren rock
- Status: Unknown

The Swan Glaciers are in the U.S. state of Montana. Situated around Swan Peak, a total of six to ten small glaciers can be found at an elevation of 8,000 feet (2,400 m) above sea level. The glaciers are in the remote Bob Marshall Wilderness.

== See also ==
- List of glaciers in the United States
