= Gray Wolf Glacier =

Glacier in Montana, United States

- Location within Montana
- Type: Mountain glacier
- Location: Mission Mountains, Missoula County, Montana, U.S.
- Coordinates: 47°17′28″N 113°51′59″W
- Area: Approximately 15 acres (0.061 km^{2})
- Terminus: Talus
- Status: Unknown

Gray Wolf Glacier is located in the US state of Montana. The glacier is situated in the Mission Mountains at an elevation of 8,000 feet (2,400 m) above sea level and is immediately northeast of Gray Wolf Peak. The glacier covers approximately 15 acres (0.061 km^{2}).

== See also ==
- List of glaciers in the United States
