= Fissure Glacier =

Glacier in Montana, United States

- Location within Montana
- Type: Mountain glacier
- Location: Mission Range, Missoula County, Montana, U.S.
- Coordinates: 47°18′45″N 113°53′11″W
- Terminus: Proglacial lake
- Status: Unknown

Fissure Glacier is located in the U.S. state of Montana. The glacier is situated east of Lowary Peak in the Mission Range.

== See also ==
- List of glaciers in the United States
