= Scimitar Glacier =

Glacier in Washington, United States

- Location within Washington (state)
- Type: Mountain glacier
- Location: Glacier Peak, Snohomish County, Washington, USA
- Coordinates: 48°06′58″N 121°07′45″W
- Length: 1.4 mi (2.3 km)
- Terminus: Icefall/Talus
- Status: Retreating

Scimitar Glacier is located on the west and northwest slopes of Glacier Peak in the U.S. state of Washington. As is true with all the glaciers found on Glacier Peak, Scimitar Glacier is retreating. During the Little Ice Age Scimitar Glacier was connected to Kennedy Glacier to the north. From about 1850 to 1946, the glacier retreated 5,250 ft (1,600 m), but advanced 1,738 ft (530 m) during a colder and wetter period lasting until about 1980. Scimitar Glacier has retreated since, but due to the thickness of the ice at the terminus, had not lost much of its length through the year 2005.

== See also ==
- List of glaciers in the United States
