= Fair Glacier =

Alpine glacier in Colorado

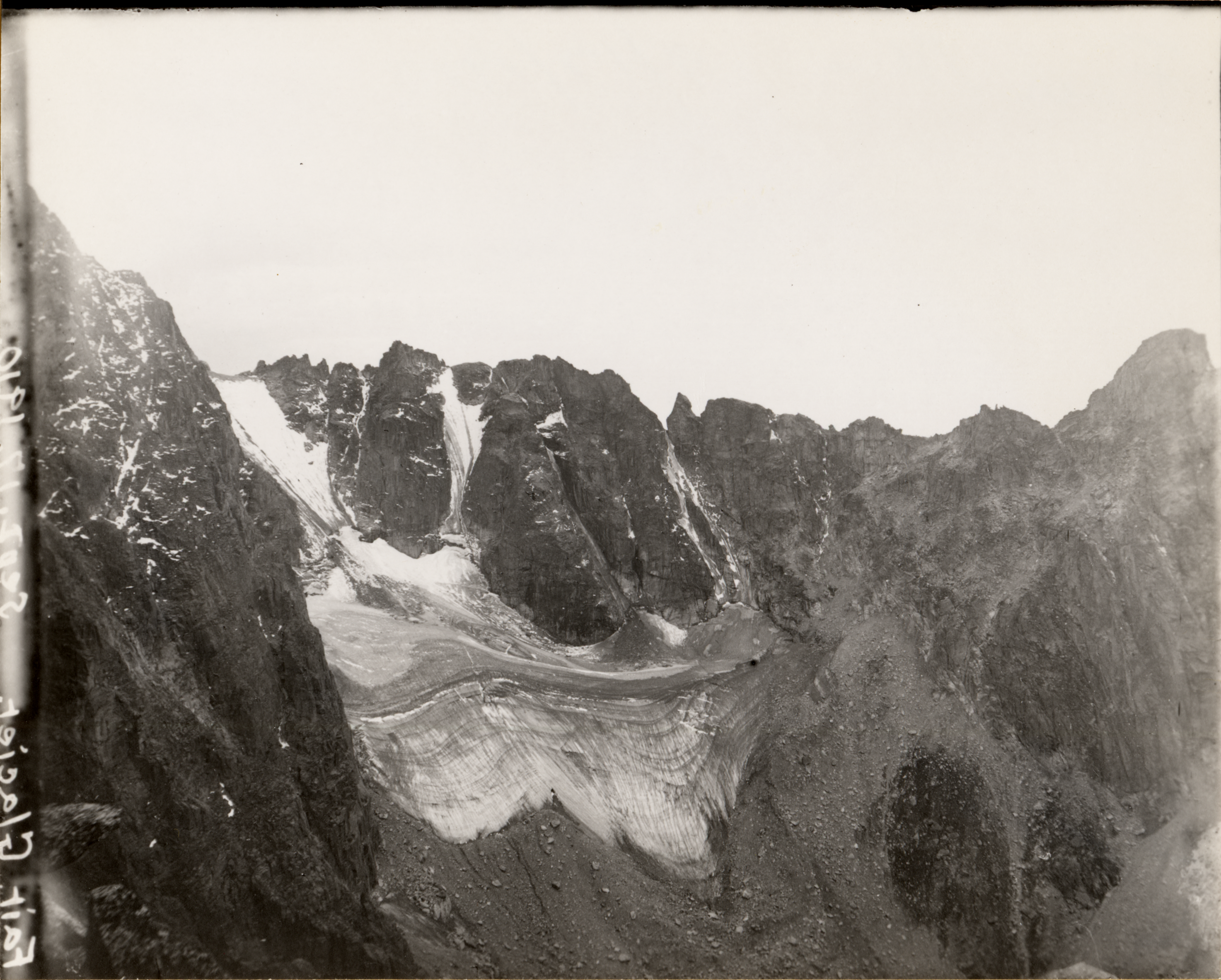
- Historical image of Fair Glacier as photographed in 1910

- Location within Colorado
- Type: Mountain glacier
- Location: Grand County, Colorado, U.S.
- Coordinates: 40°03′36″N 105°39′26″W
- Length: .20 mi (0.32 km) and .20 mi (0.32 km) wide
- Terminus: Talus
- Status: Retreating

Fair Glacier is an alpine glacier located just west of Apache Peak, in Roosevelt National Forest in the U.S. state of Colorado. The glacier is immediately west of the Continental Divide on the opposite side of the divide from Isabelle Glacier.

== See also ==
- List of glaciers in the United States
