= Martin River Glacier =

Glacier in Alaska, United States

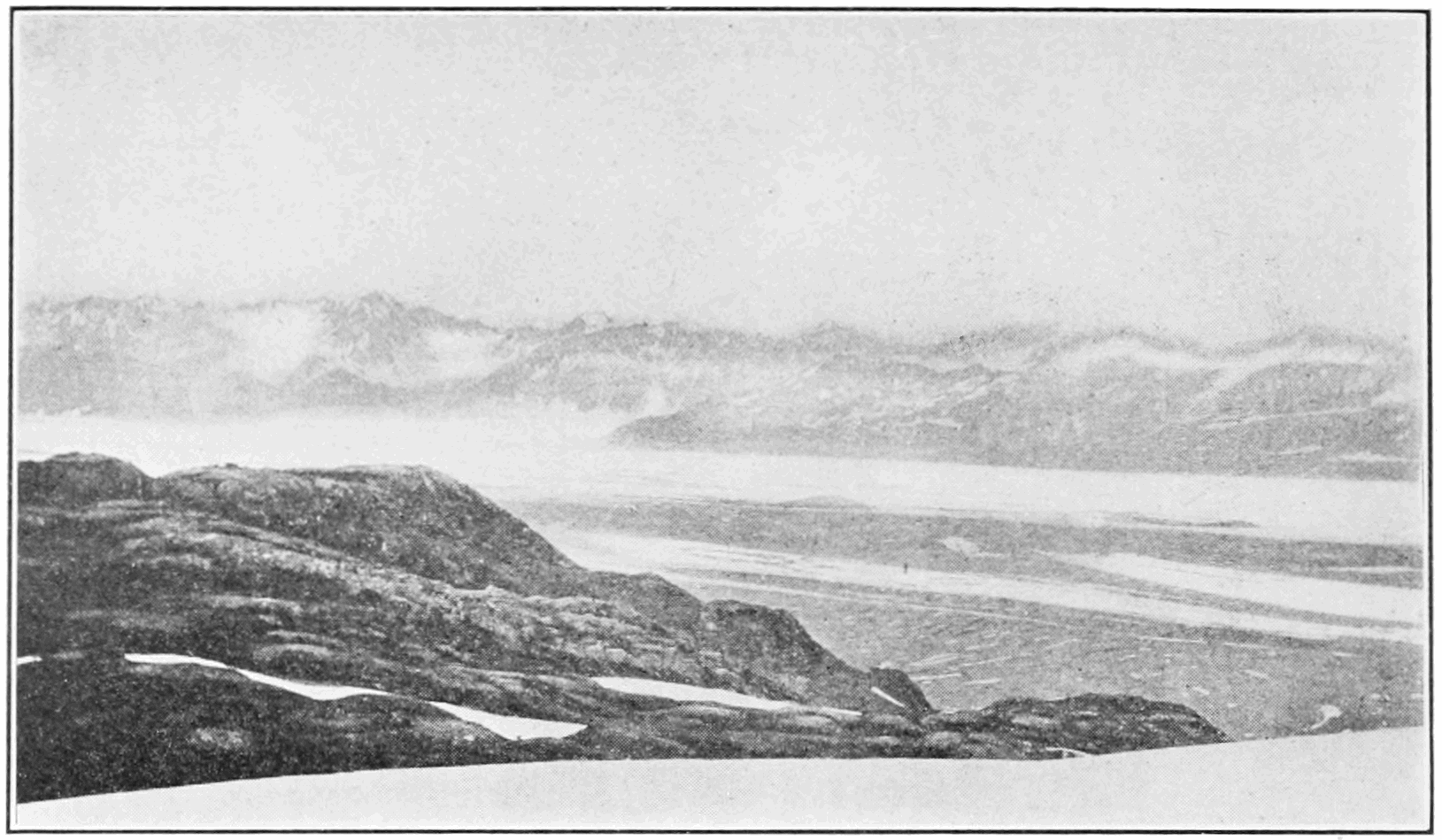
- Martin river glacier viewed from Mt. Chezum group. Photo dated 1911.

- Location within Alaska
- Interactive map of Martin River Glacier
- Location: Alaska
- Coordinates: 60°34′05″N 143°52′09″W
- Length: 25 mi (40 km)
- Status: Retreating

Martin River Glacier is a 25-mile-long (40 km) glacier in the U.S. state of Alaska in Yakutat-Copper River region. It flows southwest to its terminus at the head of the Martin River, 20 miles (32 km) northeast of Katalla, in the Chugach Mountains.

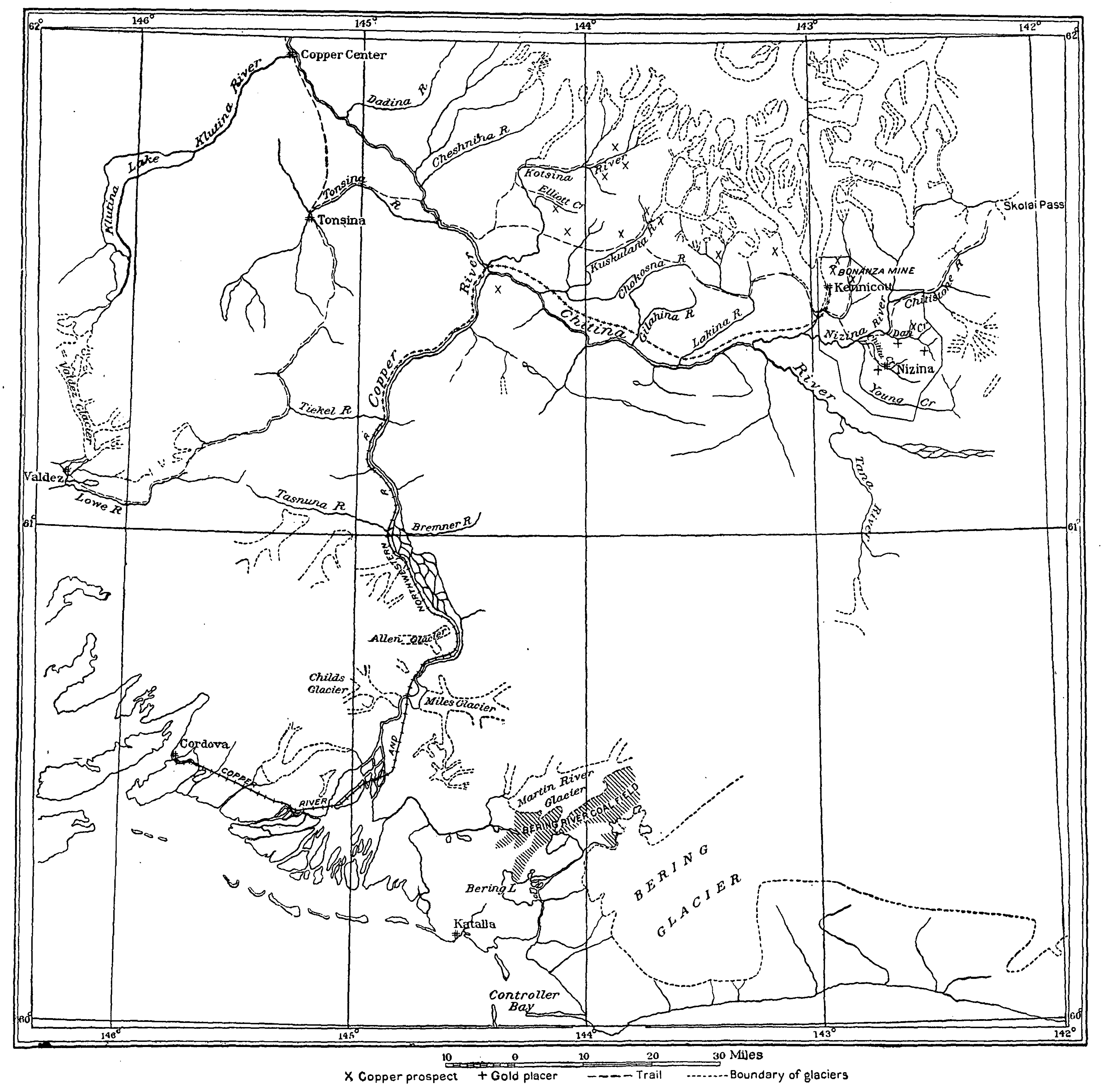
Southern portion Copper River showing the location of Martin River Glacier

== See also ==
- List of glaciers
