= Moomaw Glacier =

Glacier in Colorado, United States

- Location within Colorado
- Type: Mountain glacier
- Location: Boulder County, Colorado, United States
- Coordinates: 40°12′43″N 105°40′10″W
- Terminus: Talus
- Status: Retreating

Moomaw Glacier is an alpine glacier in Rocky Mountain National Park in the U.S. state of Colorado. Moomaw Glacier is almost 1 mi (1.6 km) northeast of Isolation Peak and the old terminal moraine of the glacier impounds Frigid Lake.

== See also ==
- List of glaciers in the United States
