= Variegated Glacier =

Glacier in Alaska, United States

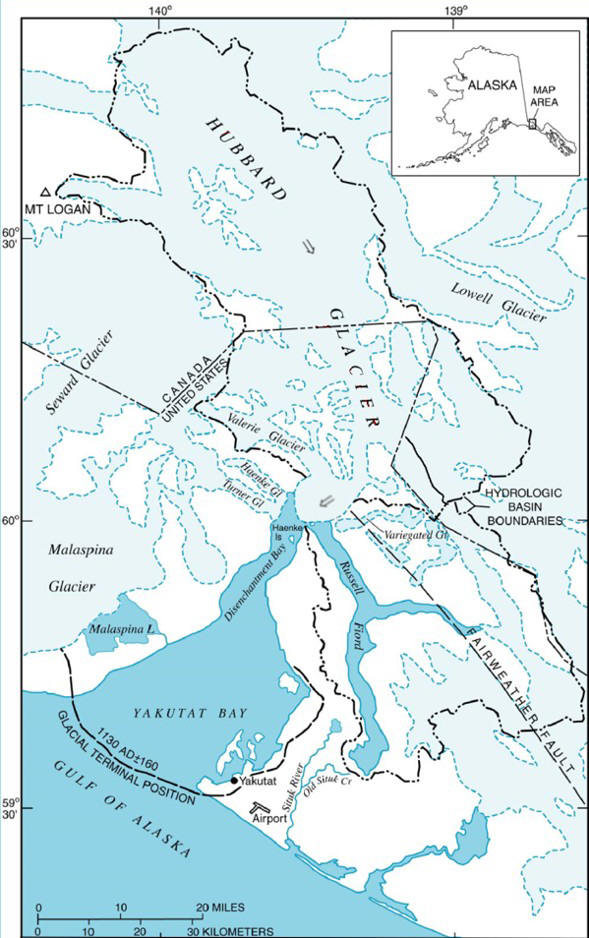
- Glaciers of Russell Fjord

- Location within Alaska
- Interactive map of Variegated Glacier
- Location: Yakutat City and Borough, Alaska, U.S.
- Coordinates: 60°00′N 139°08′W

Variegated Glacier is one of several glaciers which connect to Russell Fjord in Alaska. Variegated Glacier has been of considerable scientific interest because it surges every 20 years.

== See also ==
- List of glaciers
