= Moomaw, Virginia =

- Unincorporated community
- Location within Virginia Location within the United States
- Coordinates: 37°22′28″N 80°8′45″W
- Country: United States
- State: Virginia
- County: Roanoke
- Elevation: 1,811 ft (552 m)
- Time zone: UTC-5 (Eastern (EST))
  - Summer (DST): UTC-4 (EDT)
- GNIS feature ID: 1706748

Moomaw was an unincorporated community in Roanoke County, Virginia, United States.
