= Sunrise Glacier (Montana) =

Glacier in Montana, United States

- Location within Montana Location within the United States
- Interactive map of Sunrise Glacier
- Type: Mountain glacier
- Location: Mission Mountains, Missoula County, Montana, U.S.
- Coordinates: 47°21′26″N 113°53′16″W
- Area: Approximately 35 acres (0.14 km^{2})
- Terminus: Barren rock
- Status: Unknown

Sunrise Glacier is in the U.S. state of Montana. Sunrise Glacier is situated in the Mission Mountains at an elevation of 8,800 feet (2,700 m) above sea level and is east of Mount Shoemaker. The glacier covers approximately 35 acres (0.14 km^{2}).

== See also ==
- List of glaciers in the United States
