= Langille Glacier =

Glacier in Oregon, United States

- Location within Oregon
- Type: Mountain glacier
- Location: Hood River County, Oregon, United States
- Coordinates: 45°23′32″N 121°40′48″W
- Length: .30 mi (0.48 km)
- Terminus: Talus
- Status: Retreating

Langille Glacier is an alpine glacier on the north slope of Mount Hood in the U.S. state of Oregon. It lies at an average elevation of about 7,500 feet (2,300 m). The glacier lies entirely within Mount Hood Wilderness and is connected to Eliot Glacier to the south. Langille glacier is named after William Alexander Langille, supervisor of Tongass National Forest.

== See also ==
- List of glaciers in the United States
