= Liberty Cap Glacier =

Glacier in Washington, United States

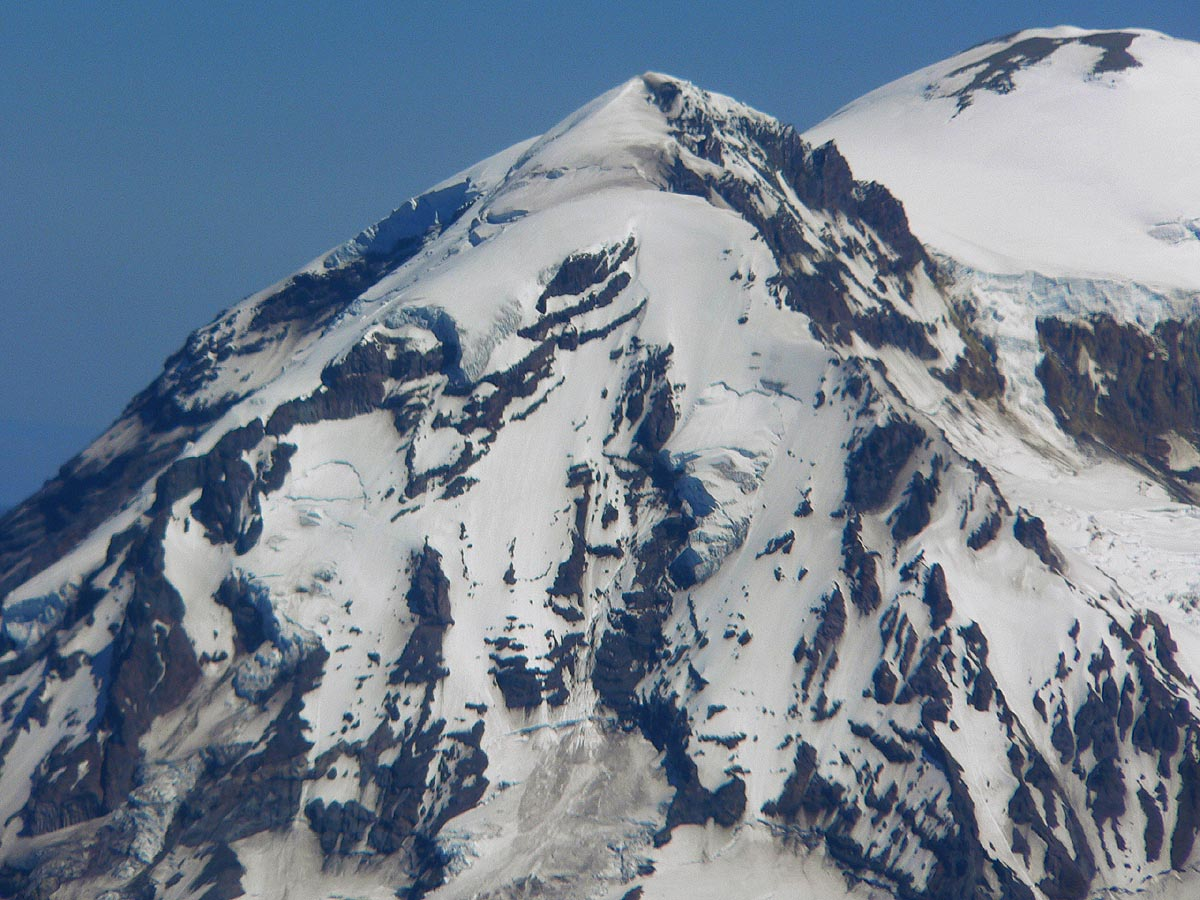
- Multi-lobed Liberty Cap Glacier terminates in ice cliffs (2005)
- Interactive map of Liberty Cap Glacier
- Type: Mountain glacier
- Location: Mount Rainier, Pierce County, Washington, USA
- Coordinates: 46°51′57″N 121°46′54″W

The Liberty Cap Glacier is a small glacier located near the summit of Mount Rainier, Washington. True to its name, the glacier does start at the 14,100 feet (4,300 m) Liberty Cap above the steep and rocky Sunset Amphitheater and the Mowich Face. Since the topography of Mount Rainier is very jagged and uneven, the glacier is warped and twisted during its descent northward down to its terminus at about 11,000 feet (3,400 m). From there, the glacier ice falls off the cliff and tumbles down the steep Mowich Face; eventually, this ice contributes to the large North Mowich Glacier at an elevation of 10,100 ft (3,100 m).

== Climate ==
Liberty Cap has an ice cap climate (Köppen EF).

Climate data for Liberty Cap 46.8598 N, 121.7749 W, Elevation: 13,146 ft (4,007 m) (1991–2020 normals)
Month	Jan	Feb	Mar	Apr	May	Jun	Jul	Aug	Sep	Oct	Nov	Dec	Year
Mean daily maximum °F (°C)	12.2 (−11.0)	11.4 (−11.4)	12.1 (−11.1)	15.9 (−8.9)	24.7 (−4.1)	31.1 (−0.5)	41.1 (5.1)	41.4 (5.2)	36.9 (2.7)	27.1 (−2.7)	15.5 (−9.2)	11.1 (−11.6)	23.4 (−4.8)
Daily mean °F (°C)	6.3 (−14.3)	4.1 (−15.5)	3.8 (−15.7)	6.6 (−14.1)	14.4 (−9.8)	20.2 (−6.6)	28.8 (−1.8)	29.3 (−1.5)	25.5 (−3.6)	17.7 (−7.9)	9.2 (−12.7)	5.5 (−14.7)	14.3 (−9.8)
Mean daily minimum °F (°C)	0.4 (−17.6)	−3.1 (−19.5)	−4.4 (−20.2)	−2.7 (−19.3)	4.1 (−15.5)	9.3 (−12.6)	16.6 (−8.6)	17.2 (−8.2)	14.1 (−9.9)	8.2 (−13.2)	2.8 (−16.2)	−0.2 (−17.9)	5.2 (−14.9)
Average precipitation inches (mm)	14.46 (367)	11.52 (293)	11.40 (290)	6.55 (166)	4.21 (107)	3.31 (84)	1.27 (32)	1.27 (32)	3.26 (83)	7.92 (201)	13.04 (331)	14.06 (357)	92.27 (2,343)
Source: PRISM Climate Group

== See also ==
- List of glaciers
