= Bastile Glacier =

Glacier in Washington, United States

- Location within Washington (state)
- Type: Mountain glacier
- Location: Whatcom County, Washington, United States
- Coordinates: 48°48′25″N 121°49′54″W
- Length: .15 mi (0.24 km)
- Terminus: Talus
- Status: Retreating

Bastile Glacier is located on the north slopes of Mount Baker in the North Cascades, U.S. state of Washington.

== See also ==
- List of glaciers in the United States
