= Grewingk Glacier =

Glacier in Alaska, United States

- Location within Alaska
- Interactive map of Grewingk Glacier
- Type: Mountain glacier
- Location: Kenai Peninsula, Alaska, U.S.
- Coordinates: 59°34′51″N 150°57′01″W
- Area: 19,200 acres (78 km^{2})
- Length: 13 miles (21 km)
- Terminus: Grewingk Creek
- Status: Retreating

Grewingk Glacier is a 13-mile-long (21 km) glacier located in the Kenai Mountains, near Kachemak Bay, in the U.S. state of Alaska. It begins at 59°34′51″N 150°57′01″W and trends northwest to 59°36′11″N 151°07′39″W, 15 miles (24 km) east-southeast of Homer.

It was named in 1880 by W. H. Dall of the United States Coast and Geodetic Survey for the Baltic German geologist Constantin Grewingk.

== See also ==
- List of glaciers
