= Hanging Glacier (Jefferson County, Washington) =

Glacier in Washington, United States

- Location within Washington (state)
- Type: Mountain glacier
- Location: Mount Anderson, Olympic National Park, Jefferson County, Washington, USA
- Coordinates: 47°43′50″N 123°19′25″W
- Length: .20 mi (0.32 km)
- Terminus: Talus
- Status: Retreating

Hanging Glacier is a located northeast of Mount Anderson in the Olympic Mountains and Olympic National Park, U.S. state of Washington. The glacier starts north of a saddle between Mount Anderson and East Peak at about 5,700 feet (1,700 m). Like all the glaciers in Olympic National Park, Hanging Glacier is in a state of retreat.

== See also ==
- List of glaciers in the United States
