= White Salmon Glacier (Mount Shuksan) =

Glacier in the state of Washington

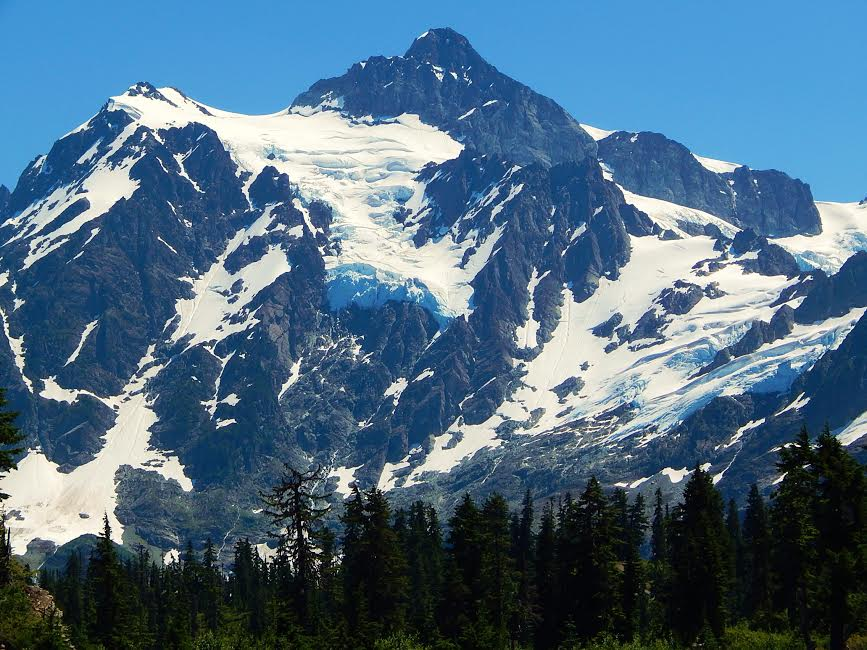
- White Salmon Glacier in lower right

- Location within Washington (state)
- Type: Mountain glacier
- Location: Whatcom County, Washington, U.S.
- Coordinates: 48°50′04″N 121°37′21″W
- Length: .40 mi (0.64 km)
- Terminus: Barren rock/icefall
- Status: Retreating

White Salmon Glacier is in North Cascades National Park in the U.S. state of Washington, on the west slopes of Mount Shuksan. White Salmon Glacier is a series of small glaciers that descend to the north from a ridge feature known as Shuksan Arm. A climbers route follows the White Salmon Glacier to Fisher Chimney which provides a faster approach than others to the summit of Mount Shuksan.

== See also ==
- List of glaciers in the United States
