= Hooker Glacier (Wyoming) =

Glacier in Wyoming, United States

- Location within Wyoming
- Type: Mountain glacier
- Location: Fremont County, Wyoming, USA
- Coordinates: 42°51′24″N 109°18′40″W
- Area: 15 acres (6.1 ha)
- Length: .15 mi (0.24 km)
- Width: .15 mi (0.24 km)
- Terminus: Talus
- Status: Unknown

Hooker Glacier is located in Shoshone National Forest, in the U.S. state of Wyoming, .25 miles (0.40 km) WNW of Mount Hooker. The glacier descends from 11,600 to 11,200 ft (3,500 to 3,400 m).

== See also ==
- List of glaciers in the United States
