= Saint Vrain Glaciers =

Small alpine glaciers in Colorado

- Location within Colorado
- Type: Mountain glacier
- Location: Boulder County, Colorado, U.S.
- Coordinates: 40°09′34″N 105°39′52″W
- Terminus: Talus/proglacial lake
- Status: Retreating

The Saint Vrain Glaciers are small alpine glaciers located in Roosevelt National Forest in the U.S. state of Colorado. The glaciers are just south of Rocky Mountain National Park and east of the Continental Divide in northeast facing cirques.

== See also ==
- List of glaciers in the United States
