= McCartney Peak =

Mountain in Washington (state), United States

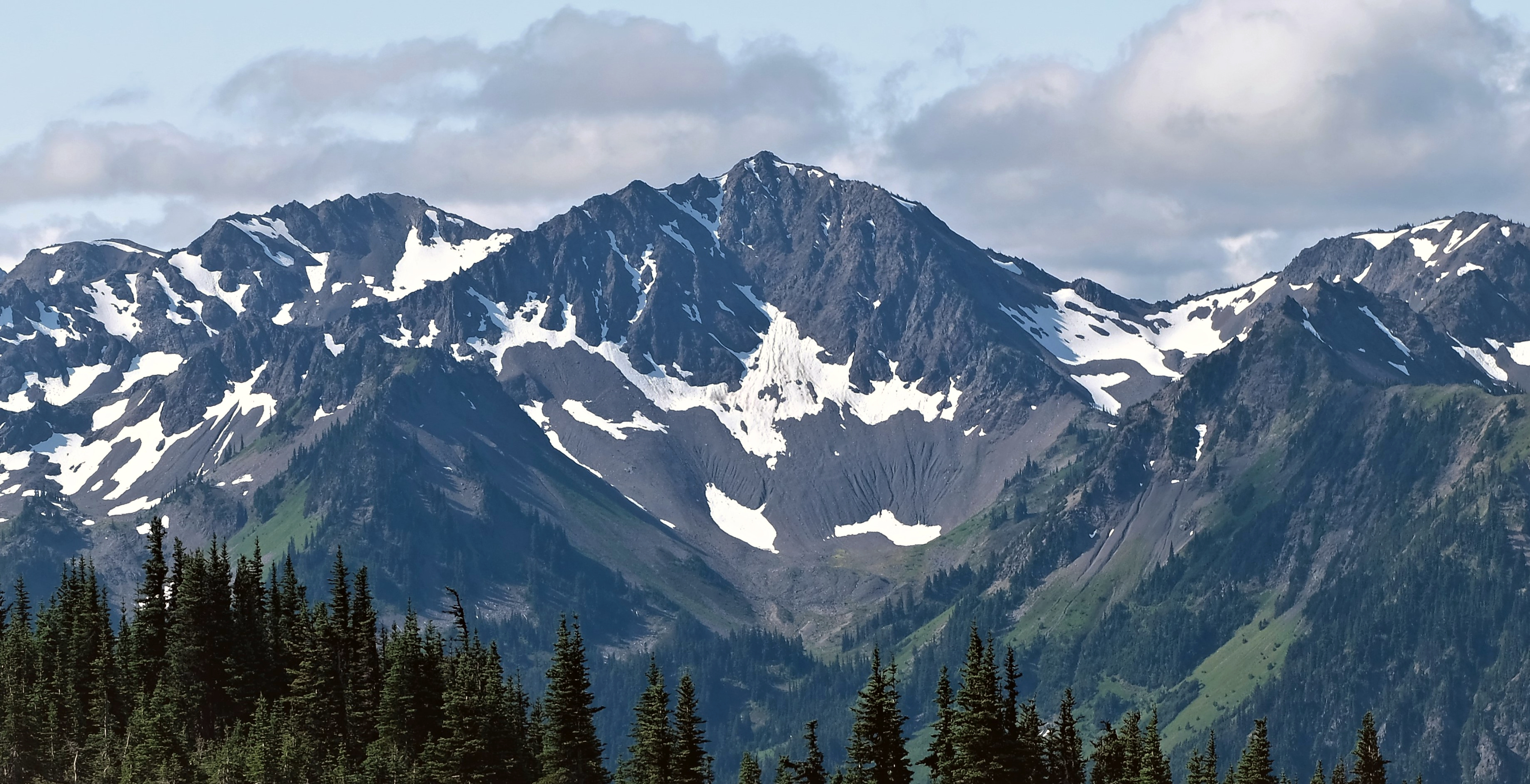
- North aspect

Highest point
- Elevation: 6,784 ft (2,068 m)
- Prominence: 544 ft (166 m)
- Parent peak: Mount Cameron (7,190 ft)
- Isolation: 2.71 mi (4.36 km)
- Coordinates: 47°51′15″N 123°23′13″W

Geography
- Location within Washington (state) Location within the United States
- Country: United States
- State: Washington
- County: Jefferson
- Protected area: Olympic National Park
- Parent range: Olympic Mountains
- Topo map: USGS McCartney Peak

Geology
- Rock age: Eocene

Climbing
- Easiest route: class 2 scrambling

McCartney Peak is a 6,784-foot-elevation (2,068-meter) mountain summit located within Olympic National Park in Jefferson County of Washington state. Part of the Olympic Mountains, McCartney Peak is situated 18 miles south of Port Angeles, and set within the Daniel J. Evans Wilderness. Topographic relief is significant as the southwest aspect rises 3,800 feet (1,200 meters) above the Lost River in approximately 1.5 mile. Precipitation runoff from the mountain drains north into headwaters of the Lillian River, east to the Gray Wolf River via Cameron Creek, and west to the Elwha River via Lost River. The nearest higher neighbor is line parent Mount Cameron, 3.1 mi (5.0 km) to the southeast.

== History ==
McCartney Peak was in the late 19th century known as "Lillian Peak," and nearby Windfall Peak was originally named McCartney Peak, for a trapper known as "Old Man McCartney" who frequented this area. Over the subsequent years, mapping errors resulted in present-day names and locations.

== Climate ==
Based on the Köppen climate classification, McCartney Peak is located in the marine west coast climate zone of western North America. Weather fronts originating in the Pacific Ocean travel northeast toward the Olympic Mountains. As fronts approach, they are forced upward by the peaks (orographic lift), causing them to drop their moisture in the form of rain or snow. As a result, the Olympics experience high precipitation, especially during the winter months in the form of snowfall. Because of maritime influence, snow tends to be wet and heavy, resulting in avalanche danger. During winter months weather is usually cloudy, but due to high pressure systems over the Pacific Ocean that intensify during summer months, there is often little or no cloud cover during the summer. The months July through September offer the most favorable weather for viewing or climbing this mountain.

== Geology ==
The Olympic Mountains are composed of obducted clastic wedge material and oceanic crust, primarily Eocene sandstone, turbidite, and basaltic oceanic crust. The mountains were sculpted during the Pleistocene era by erosion and glaciers advancing and retreating multiple times.

== See also ==
- Geology of the Pacific Northwest
