= North Guardian Glacier =

Glacier in Washington, United States

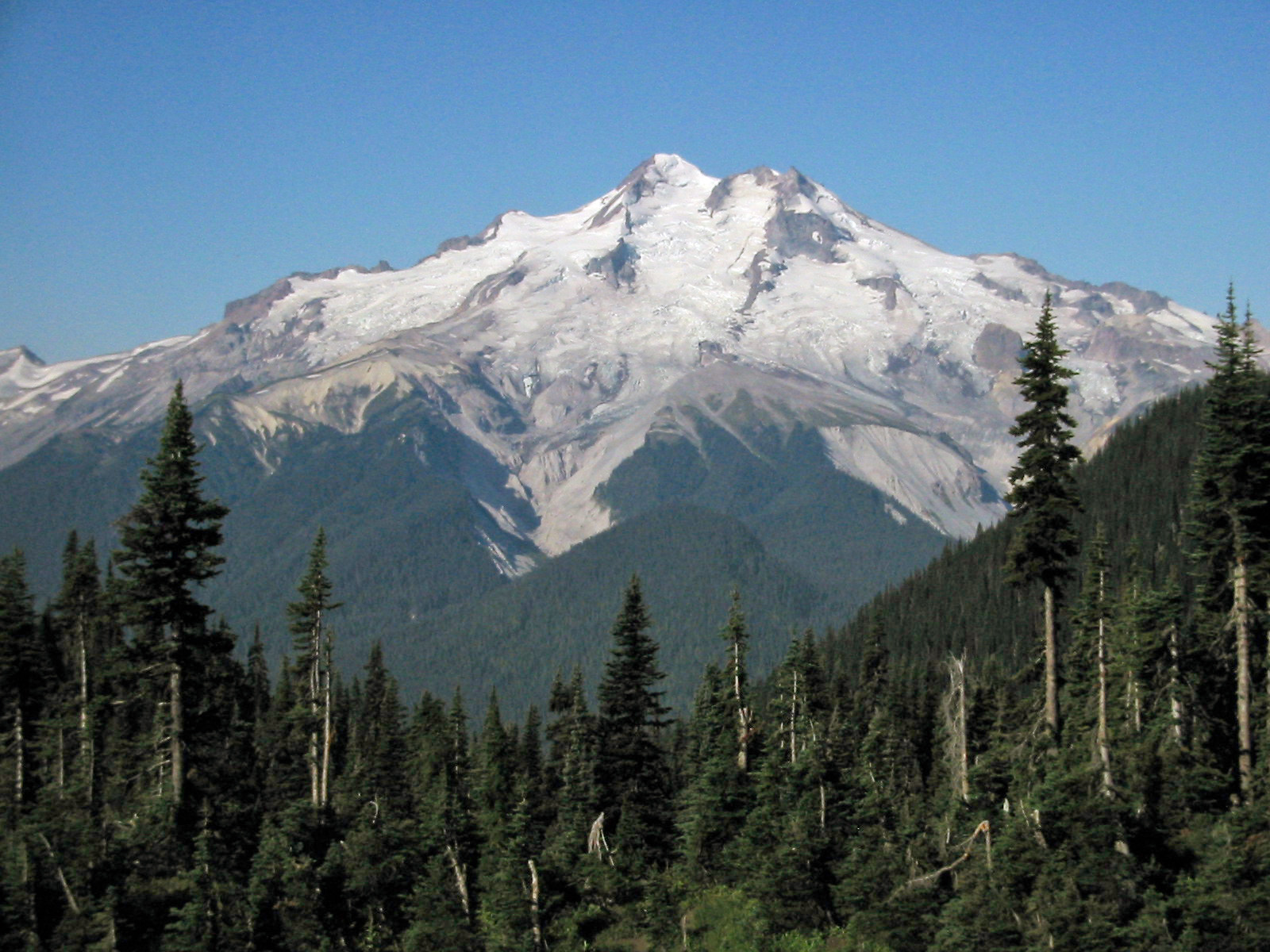
- Left to right, Cool, Chocolate, North Guardian and Dusty Glaciers on the east slopes of Glacier Peak

- Location within Washington (state)
- Type: Mountain glacier
- Location: Glacier Peak, Snohomish County, Washington, USA
- Coordinates: 48°06′03″N 121°05′58″W
- Length: 1 mi (1.6 km)
- Terminus: Barren rock
- Status: Retreating

North Guardian Glacier is located on east slopes of Glacier Peak in the U.S. state of Washington. The glacier descends from 8,600 ft (2,600 m) to 6,430 ft (1,960 m) and is partially connected to Chocolate Glacier which lies to its south. As is true with all the glaciers found on Glacier Peak, North Guardian Glacier is retreating. North Guardian Glacier retreated approximately 1,500 m (4,900 ft) between 1850 and 1946, however during a cooler and wetter period from about 1950 to 1979, the glacier advanced modestly. Since then North Guardian Glacier resumed retreating and thinning and by 2005 the glacier had returned to its minimum length as recorded in 1946.

== See also ==
- List of glaciers in the United States
