= Newton Clark Glacier =

Glacier on Mount Hood, Oregon, United States

- Location within Oregon
- Type: Mountain glacier
- Location: Hood River County, Oregon, United States
- Coordinates: 45°22′00″N 121°41′12″W
- Area: 345 acres (140 ha) (2004 estimate)
- Terminus: Talus
- Status: Retreating

Newton Clark Glacier is an alpine glacier on the southeast slope of Mount Hood in the U.S. state of Oregon. The glacier extends from 10,400 to 6,500 feet (3,200 to 2,000 m). The glacier lies entirely within Mount Hood Wilderness.

Between 1907 and 2004, Newton Clark Glacier lost 32% of its surface area and the glacier terminus retreated 310 metres (1,020 ft) over the same time period.

== See also ==
- List of glaciers in the United States
