= Sky Top Glacier =

Glacier in Montana, United States

- Location within Montana
- Type: Mountain glacier
- Location: Beartooth Mountains, Park County, Montana, U.S.
- Coordinates: 45°09′42″N 109°49′03″W
- Area: Approximately 25 acres (0.10 km^{2})
- Terminus: Barren rock
- Status: Unknown

Sky Top Glacier is in the Beartooth Mountains in the U.S. state of Montana. The glacier is situated at an elevation of 11,600 feet (3,500 m) in a cirque to the west of Granite Peak, the tallest summit in Montana. The glacier covers approximately 25 acres (0.10 km^{2}) and a small proglacial lake is near the glacier terminus.

== See also ==
- List of glaciers in the United States
