= Isabelle Glacier =

Alpine glacier in Colorado

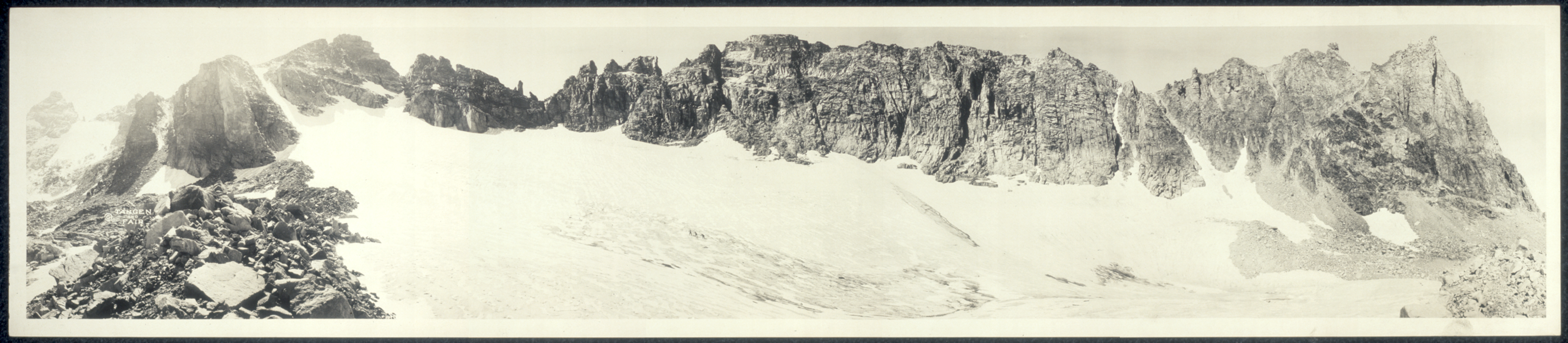
- Isabelle Glacier as photographed in the 1920s

- Location within Colorado
- Type: Mountain glacier
- Location: Boulder County, Colorado, United States
- Coordinates: 40°03′48″N 105°38′42″W
- Length: 0.15 mi (0.24 km) and 0.30 mi (0.48 km) wide
- Terminus: Talus/proglacial lake
- Status: Retreating

Isabelle Glacier is an alpine glacier located 0.28 mi (0.45 km) northeast of Apache Peak and 0.25 mi (0.40 km) southwest of Shoshoni Peak, in Roosevelt National Forest in the US state of Colorado. The glacier is immediately east of the Continental Divide on the opposite side of the divide from Fair Glacier. Isabelle Glacier is the source of the South Saint Vrain Creek and can be reached by trail and is a 8.4 mi (13.5 km) round-trip hike from the trailhead.

== See also ==
- List of glaciers in the United States
