= List of glaciers in Denali National Park and Preserve =

There are at least 40 named and hundreds of unnamed glaciers in Denali National Park and Preserve.

== List of glaciers ==
- Brooks Glacier (63°09′18″N 150°36′08″W; 7,346 feet (2,239 m))
- Buckskin Glacier (62°59′09″N 150°21′50″W; 2,936 feet (895 m))
- Caldwell Glacier (62°23′36″N 152°39′51″W; 4,327 feet (1,319 m))
- Cantwell Glacier (63°26′44″N 149°26′42″W; 6,132 feet (1,869 m))
- Chedotlothna Glacier (62°53′22″N 151°52′17″W; 3,576 feet (1,090 m))
- Cul-de-sac Glacier (62°27′31″N 152°46′07″W; 4,869 feet (1,484 m))
- Dall Glacier (62°33′00″N 151°56′00″W; 650 feet (200 m))
- Eldridge Glacier (63°01′24″N 150°07′26″W; 2,923 feet (891 m))
- Fleischmann Glacier (62°21′13″N 152°50′25″W; 4,318 feet (1,316 m))
- Foraker Glacier (63°05′09″N 151°26′17″W; 4,567 feet (1,392 m))
- Herron Glacier (63°03′18″N 151°36′54″W; 3,894 feet (1,187 m))
- Kahiltna Glacier (62°45′57″N 151°18′12″W; 4,081 feet (1,244 m))
- Kanikula Glacier (62°44′39″N 150°01′11″W; 2,513 feet (766 m) (also the Southeast, East and Northeast Forks of Kahiltna Glacier near its head))
- Lacuna Glacier (62°44′28″N 151°32′16″W; 3,340 feet (1,020 m))
- Muldrow Glacier (63°15′38″N 150°26′14″W; 4,524 feet (1,379 m))
- Peters Glacier (63°10′52″N 150°00′09″W; 4,803 feet (1,464 m))
- Polychrome Glaciers (63°27′20″N 149°50′41″W; 5,108 feet (1,557 m) (five glaciers in neighboring valleys))
- Ruth Glacier (62°50′07″N 150°51′36″W; 2,185 feet (666 m) (also the West, Northwest and Northeast Forks of Ruth Glacier near its head))
- Shadows Glacier (62°27′57″N 152°42′08″W; 4,121 feet (1,256 m))
- Shelf Glacier (62°27′33″N 152°43′58″W; 5,732 feet (1,747 m))
- Straightaway Glacier (63°06′46″N 151°19′55″W; 4,793 feet (1,461 m))
- Sunrise Glacier (63°21′49″N 150°10′06″W; 6,322 feet (1,927 m))
- Sunset Glacier (63°20′06″N 150°13′04″W; 4,862 feet (1,482 m))
- Surprise Glacier (62°41′55″N 152°18′27″W; 3,517 feet (1,072 m))
- Tatina Glacier (62°27′03″N 152°48′44″W; 4,541 feet (1,384 m))
- Tokositna Glacier (62°50′07″N 150°51′36″W; 2,507 feet (764 m))
- Traleika Glacier (63°09′30″N 150°46′26″W; 6,466 feet (1,971 m) (also the West Fork of Traleika Glacier))
- West Fork Glacier (63°17′00″N 150°05′48″W; 4,088 feet (1,246 m))
- Yentna Glacier (62°43′07″N 151°40′57″W; 2,549 feet (777 m))

== See also ==
- Mountains and mountain ranges of Denali National Park and Preserve
