= Scotty Lake =

- Location within Alaska
- Location: Matanuska-Susitna Borough, Alaska
- Coordinates: 62°19′28″N 150°19′01″W
- Basin countries: United States

Scotty Lake is the name of three lakes in the U.S. state of Alaska:

- A one-mile-long (1.6 km) lake in the Matanuska-Susitna Borough, located along near the Parks Highway at 62°19′28″N 150°19′01″W, six miles (9.7 km) west of Talkeetna.
- A 0.7-mile-long (1,130 m) lake in Denali National Park and Preserve, Denali Borough, located at 62°55′24″N 152°30′07″W, 21 miles (34 km) northwest of Mount Russell, in southwestern Denali Borough.
- In the Yukon-Koyukuk Census Area, at 66°49′13″N 143°29′53″W.
