= Kahiltna Queen =

Mountain summit in Alaska

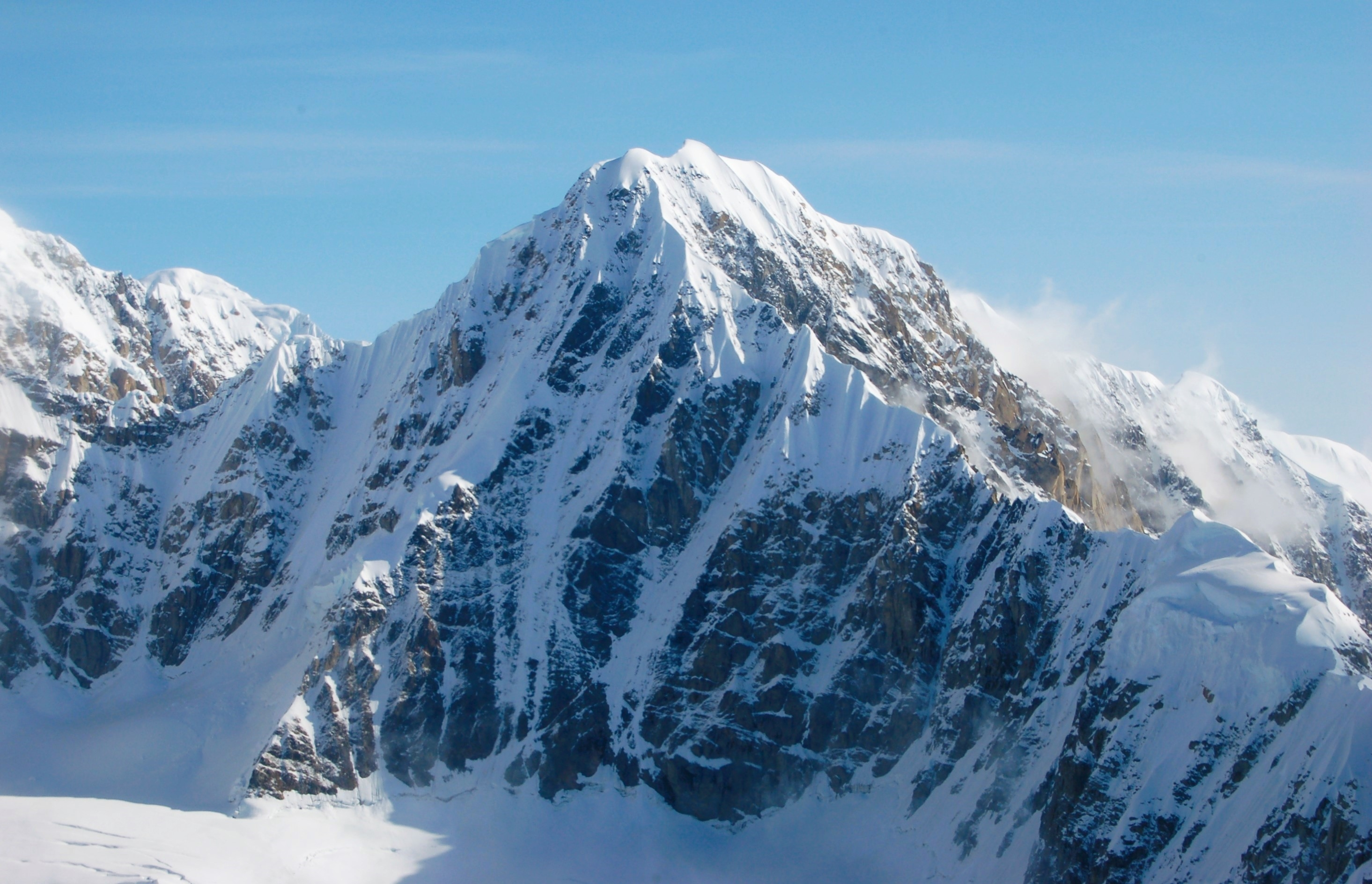
- Aerial view from WSW

Highest point
- Elevation: 12,380 ft (3,773 m)
- Prominence: 1,430 ft (440 m)
- Parent peak: Peak 13050
- Isolation: 1.46 mi (2.35 km)
- Coordinates: 62°58′49″N 151°02′27″W

Geography
- Location within Alaska
- Interactive map of Kahiltna Queen
- Country: United States
- State: Alaska
- Borough: Matanuska-Susitna
- Protected area: Denali National Park
- Parent range: Alaska Range
- Topo map: USGS Talkeetna D-3

Geology
- Mountain type: Glacial horn
- Rock type: Granite

Climbing
- First ascent: 1977

Kahiltna Queen is a 12,380-foot-elevation (3,773-meter) mountain summit in the U.S. state of Alaska.

== Description ==
Kahiltna Queen is located 140 miles (225 km) north of Anchorage in Denali National Park and the Alaska Range. It is situated east of the Denali Base Camp for mountaineers attempting to climb Denali, Mount Foraker, or Mount Hunter. Kahiltna Queen is set 6.24 mi (10 km) south of Denali's summit, 3.63 mi (6 km) south of Kahiltna Peaks, and 2.62 mi (4 km) northeast of Hunter. Access to the area is via air taxi from Talkeetna. The peak has the shape of a steep glacial horn sculpted by three glaciers as it rises above the heads of West Fork Ruth Glacier, Southeast Fork Kahiltna Glacier, and the Tokositna Glacier. Topographic relief is significant as the summit rises 3,400 feet (1,036 meters) above the Tokositna Glacier in one-half mile (0.8 km). The peak ranks as the 54th-highest summit in Alaska. The first ascent of the summit was made in April 1977 by Alan Kearney, Mai Ulrich, and Chuck Sink who christened it "Humble Peak."

== Etymology ==
The mountain's toponym commemorates Frances Randall (1925–1984), the first Denali Base Camp manager for nine climbing seasons (1974–1983). She was planning a tenth season, but cancer claimed her life. Her expertise was instrumental in coordinating many rescues that saved lives and earned her the nicknames Kahiltna Queen and Guardian Angel of McKinley. She was a member of the Fairbanks Symphony Orchestra, often playing the violin at base camp over the CB radio. In 1964 she became the sixth woman to reach the summit of Denali. "Kahiltna" is a Athabaskan word meaning "from the source."

== Climate ==
Based on the Köppen climate classification, Kahiltna Queen is located in a Tundra climate zone with long, cold, snowy winters, and cool summers. Weather systems are forced upwards by the Alaska Range (orographic lift), causing heavy precipitation in the form of snowfall. Winter temperatures can drop below −20 °F with wind chill factors below −30 °F. The months May through June offer the most favorable weather for viewing and climbing.

== Gallery ==
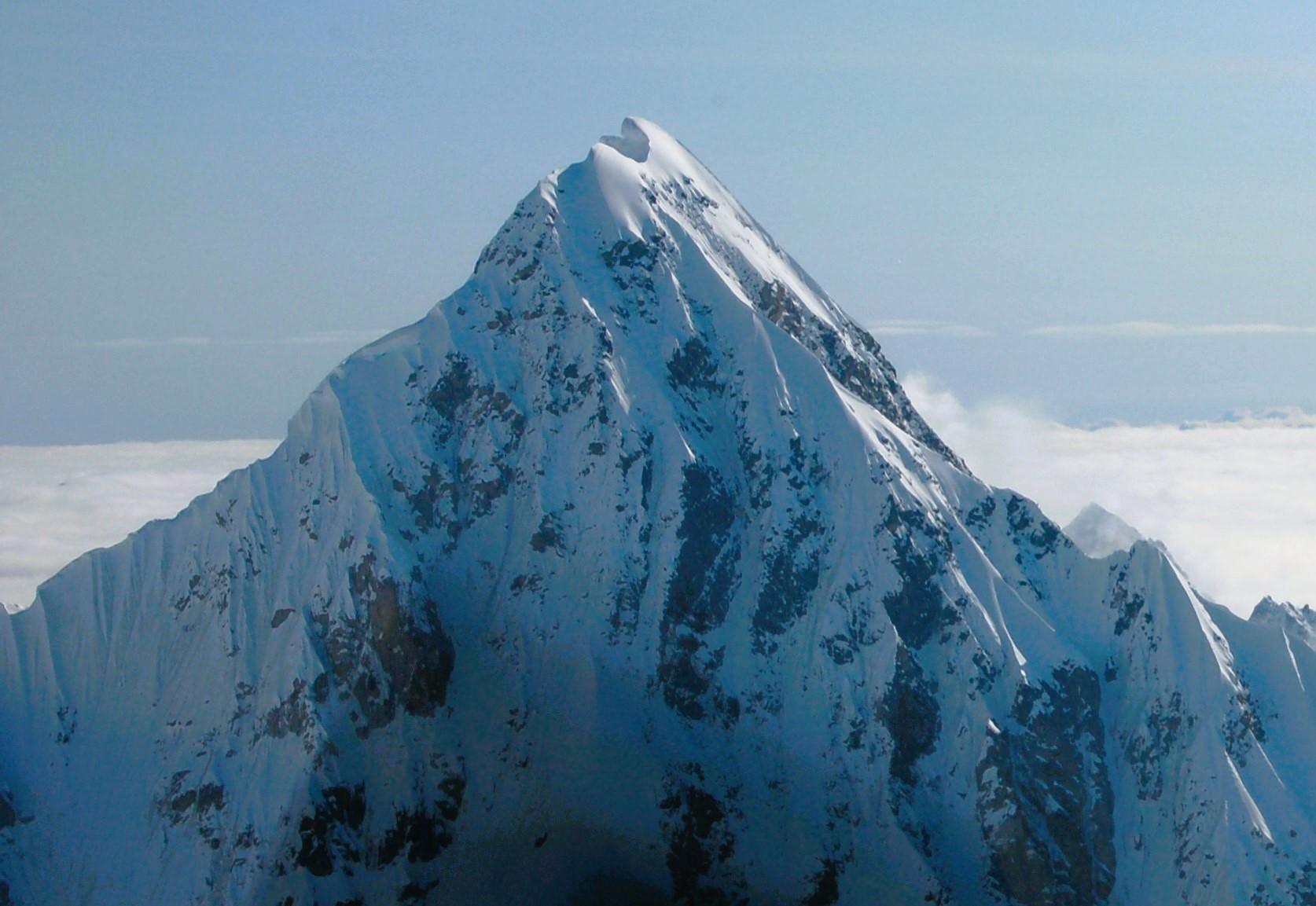
West aspect

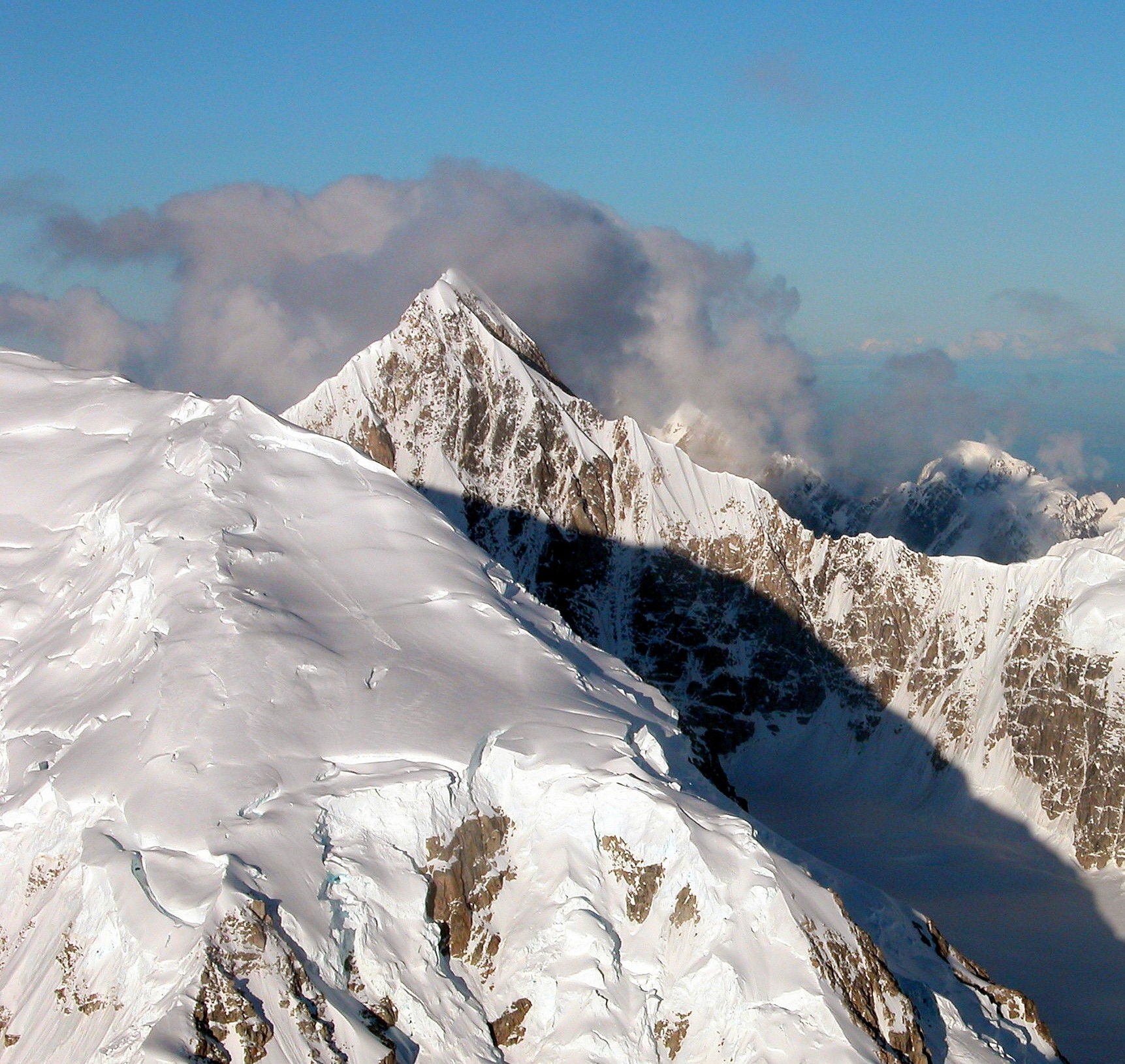
West aspect

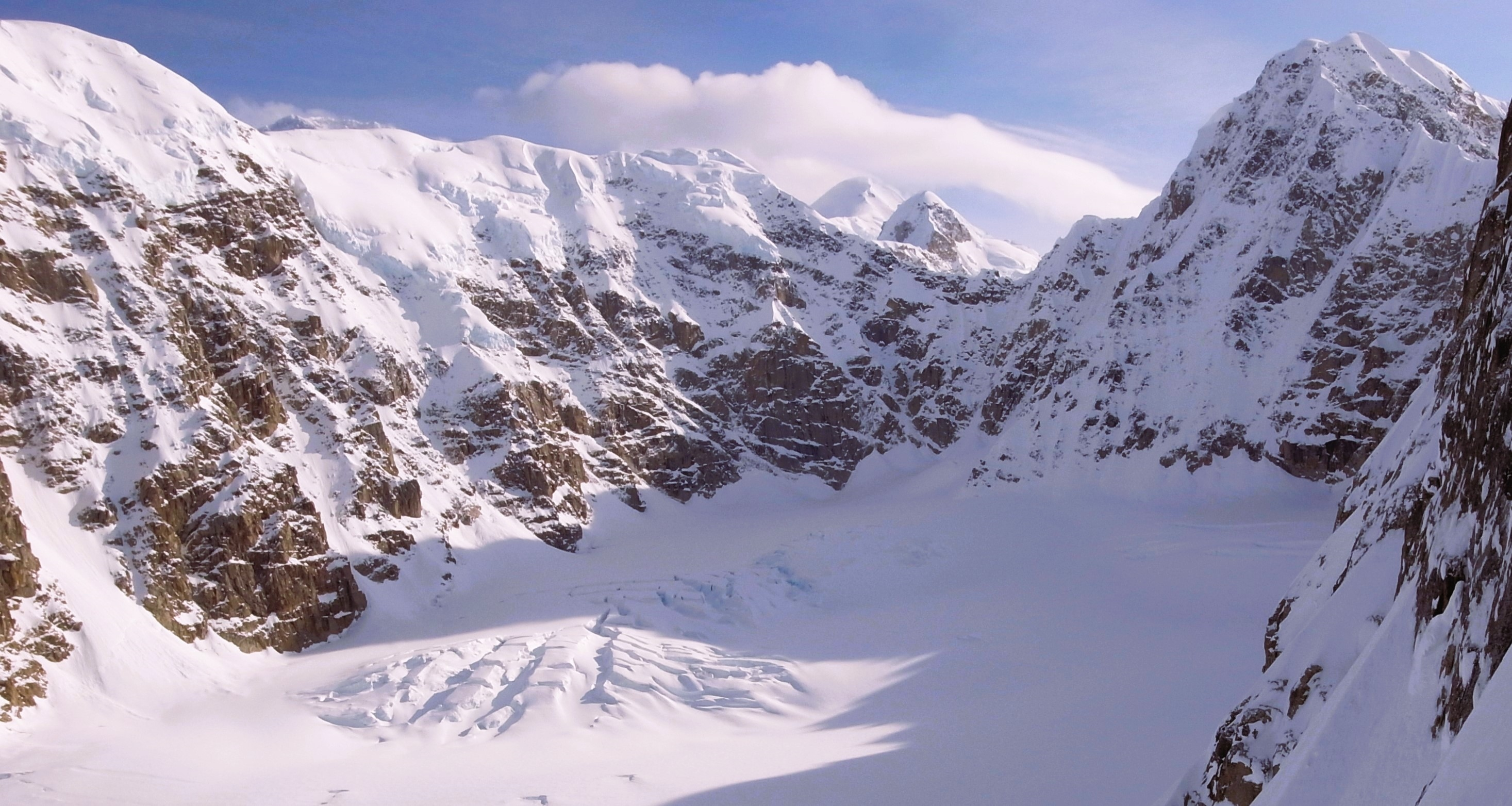
Kahiltna Queen at upper right, viewed from north slope of Mount Hunter.
Head of Southeast Fork Kahiltna Glacier below.

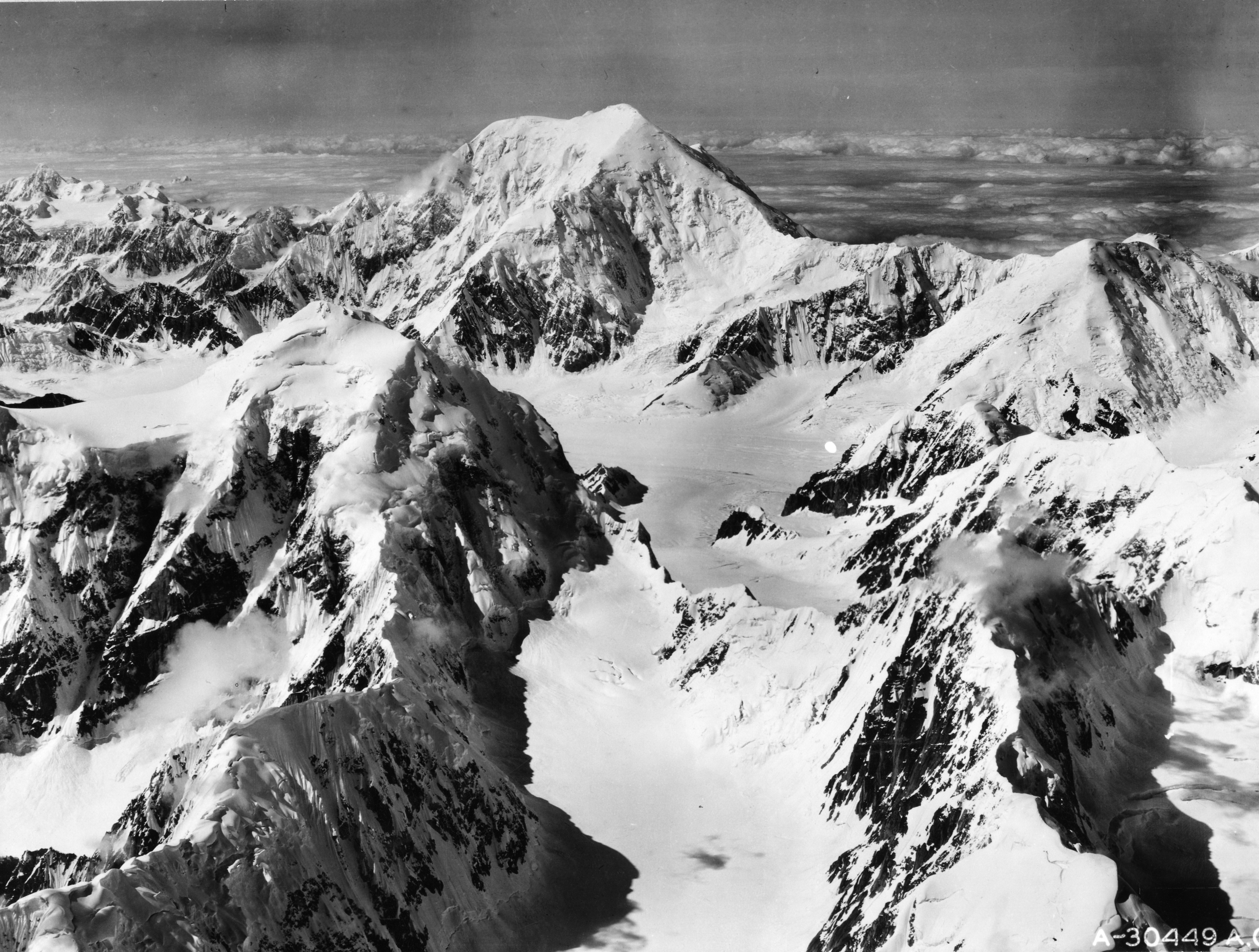
Kahiltna Queen in lower right with Mt. Hunter (left), Mt. Foraker (top), and Mt. Crosson (upper right) in 1940s

== See also ==
- Mount Frances
- Mountain peaks of Alaska
- Geography of Alaska
