= Hess Mountain =

Mountain in Alaska, United States

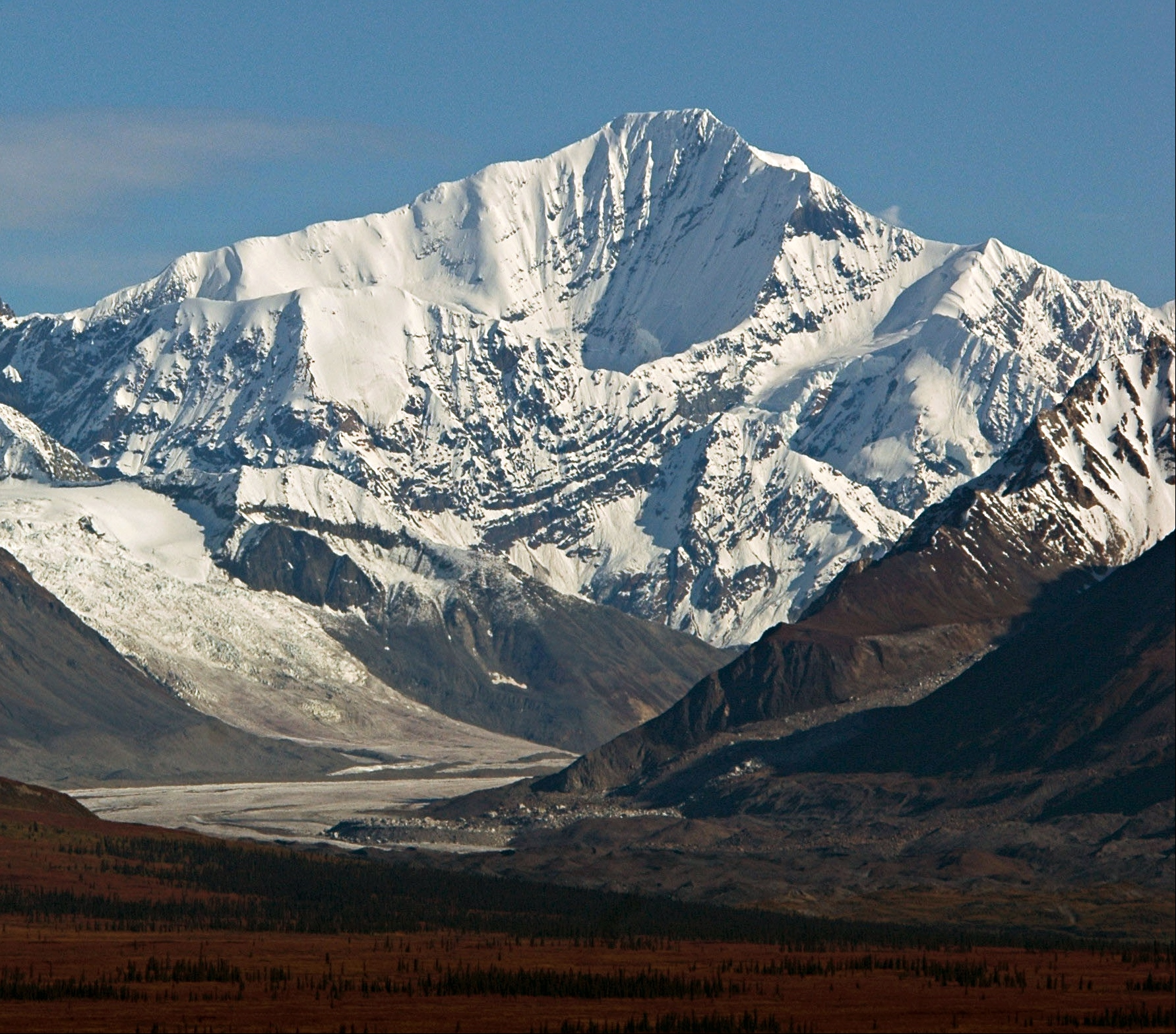
- Hess Mountain's south peak, from the SW

Highest point
- Elevation: 11,940 ft (3,639 m)
- Prominence: 2,440 ft (744 m)
- Parent peak: Mount Deborah (12,339 ft)
- Isolation: 2.7 mi (4.3 km)
- Coordinates: 63°38′18″N 147°08′54″W

Geography
- Location within Alaska
- Interactive map of Hess Mountain
- Location: Denali Borough; Alaska, United States
- Parent range: Alaska Range; Hayes Range
- Topo map: USGS Healy C-1

Climbing
- First ascent: 1951

Hess Mountain, also known as Mount Hess, is an 11,940 ft (3,640 m) elevation glaciated summit located on the crest of the Alaska Range, in Alaska, United States. It is the seventh-highest peak in the Hayes Range which is a subrange of the Alaska Range. This remote peak is situated 13.3 mi (21 km) west of Mount Hayes, and 90 mi (145 km) south of Fairbanks. Mount Deborah, the nearest higher neighbor, is positioned 2.8 mi (5 km) to the west. Precipitation runoff from the mountain drains into tributaries of the Susitna and Tanana River drainage basins. The mountain's name was reported in 1912 by the United States Geological Survey. The first ascent was made May 24, 1951, by Alston Paige, Dick Holdren, Ed Huizer, Howard Bowman, and Elton Thayer. The first ascent via the North Ridge was made May 23, 1976, by Steven Hackett and Thomas Hillis.

== Climate ==
Based on the Köppen climate classification, Hess Mountain is located in a subarctic climate zone with long, cold, snowy winters, and mild summers. Winter temperatures can drop below −20 °C with wind chill factors below −30 °C. This climate supports the Gillam and West Fork Glaciers surrounding this peak. The months May through June offer the most favorable weather for climbing or viewing.

== Gallery ==
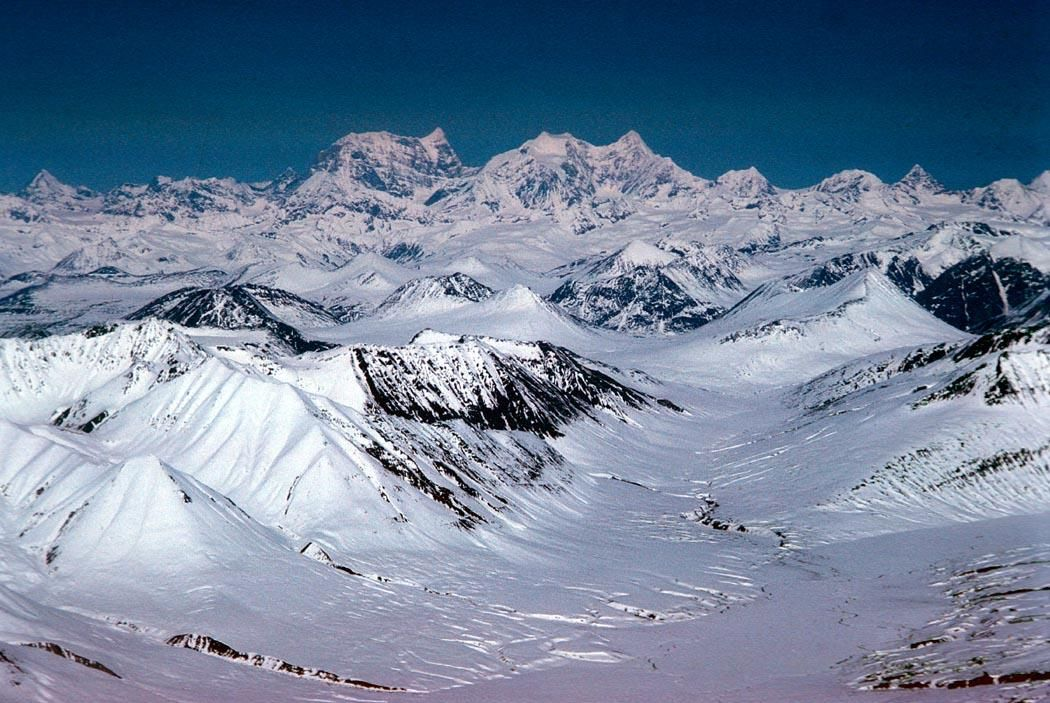
Mts. Deborah and Hess

== See also ==
- List of the highest major summits of the United States
- List of mountain peaks of Alaska
- Geology of Alaska
