= Kichatna Spire =

Mountain in Alaska, United States

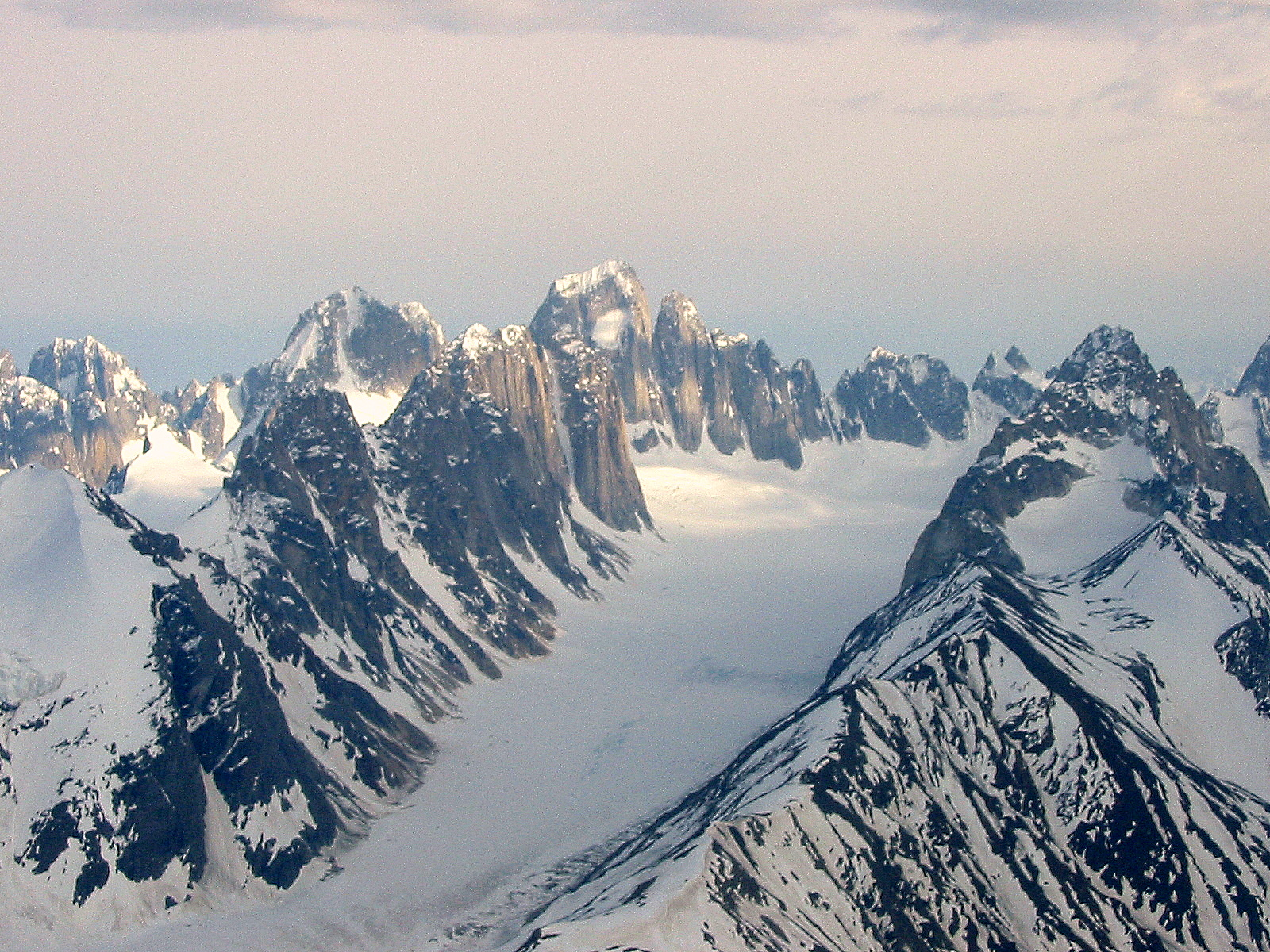
- Kichatna Spire is highest peak, centered

Highest point
- Elevation: 8,985 ft (2,739 m)
- Prominence: 6,185 ft (1,885 m)
- Listing: US most prominent peaks 53rd
- Coordinates: 62°25′23″N 152°43′23″W

Geography
- Location within Alaska
- Location: Matanuska-Susitna Borough, Alaska, United States
- Parent range: Alaska Range
- Topo map: USGS Talkeetna B-6

Kichatna Spire, sometimes called the Kichatna Spires, is a 8,985-foot (2,739 m) spire-shaped peak in the Kichatna Mountains of the Alaska Range, in Denali National Park and Preserve, southwest of Denali. Cul-de-sac, Shelf and Shadows Glaciers originate at Kichatna Spire.

== Gallery ==
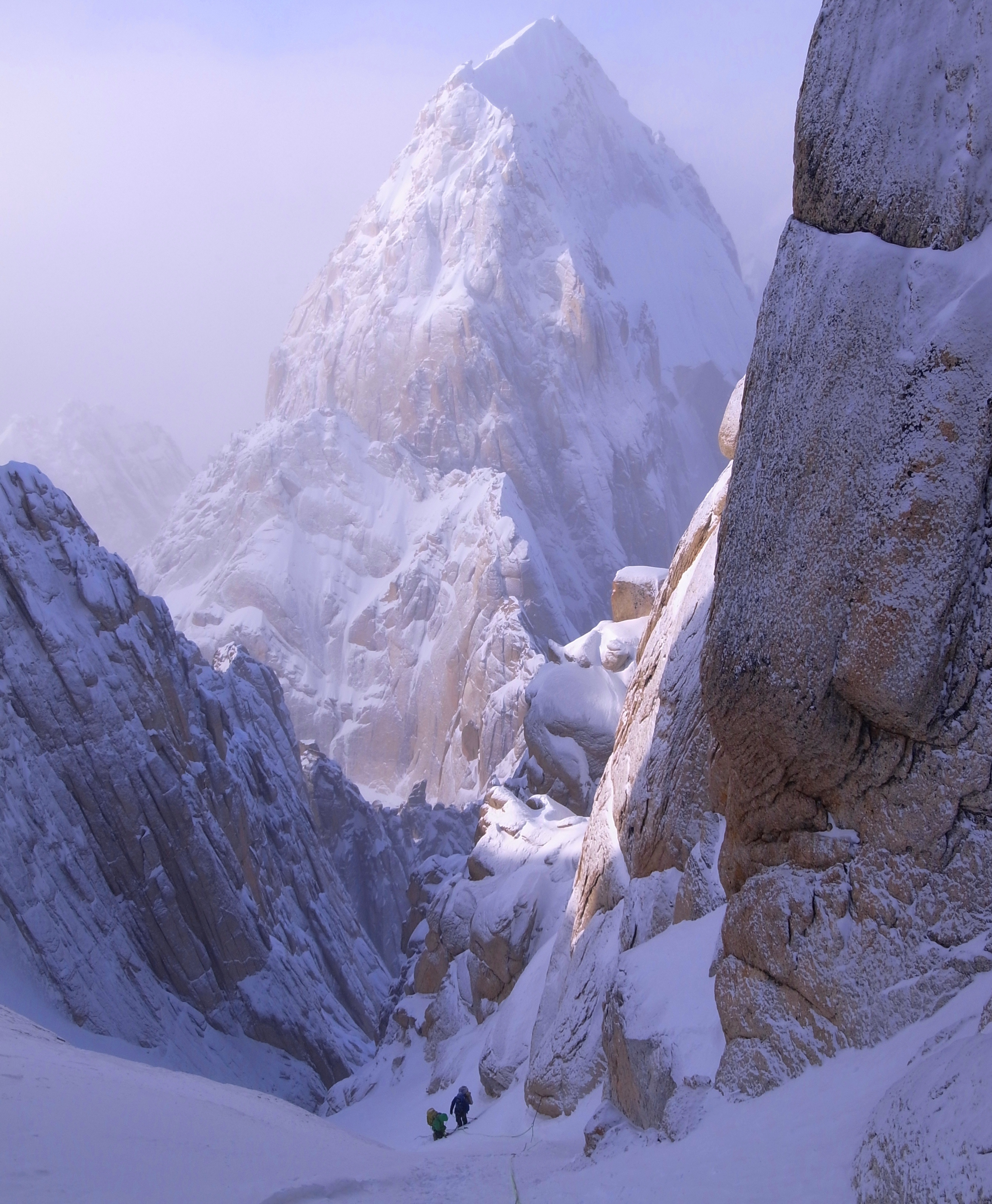

== See also ==
- List of mountain peaks of North America
  - List of mountain peaks of the United States
    - List of mountain peaks of Alaska
- List of Ultras of the United States
