= Mount Laurens =

Mountain in Alaska, United States

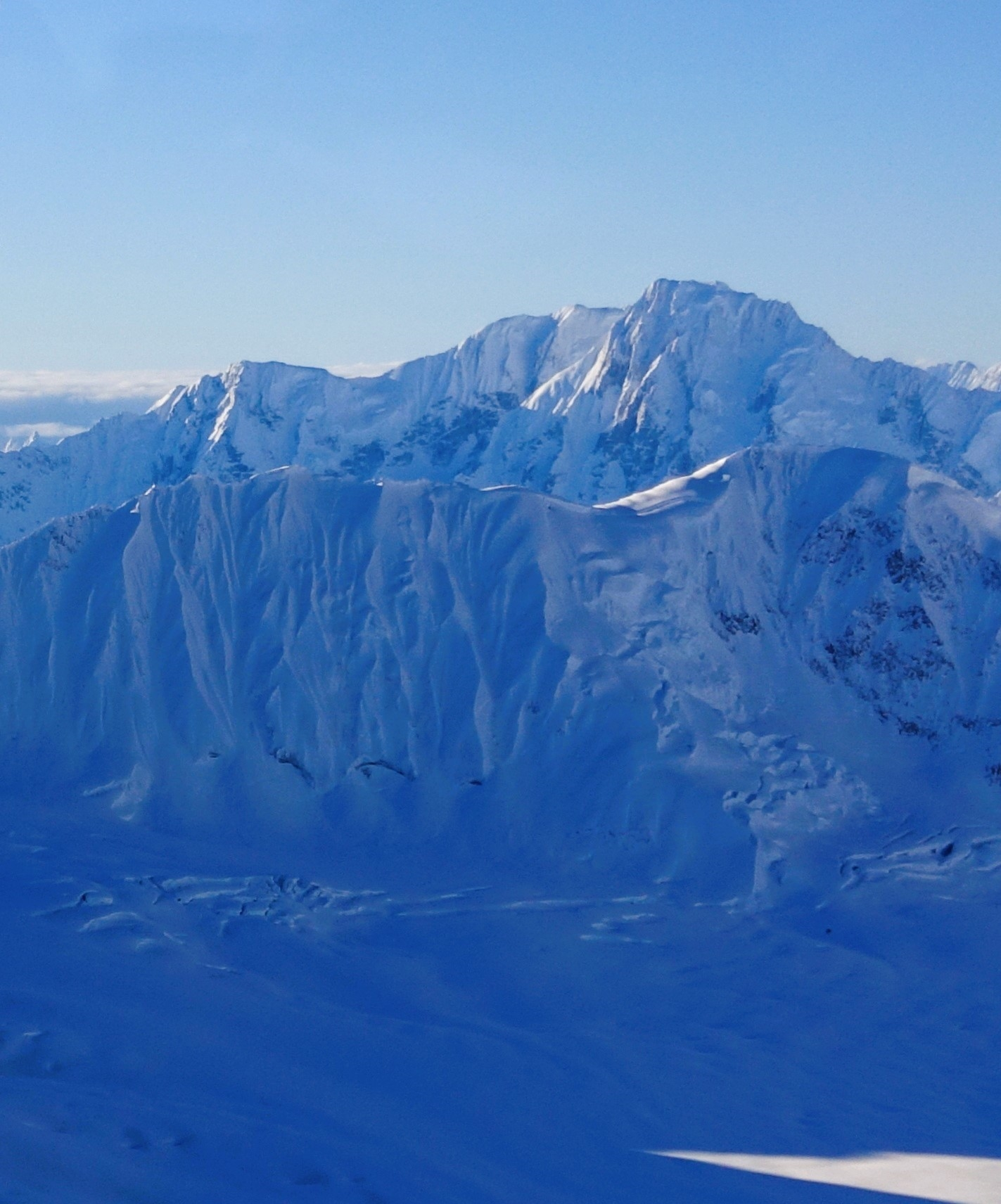
- Aerial view of east aspect (upper right)

Highest point
- Elevation: 10,042 ft (3,061 m)
- Prominence: 1,842 ft (561 m)
- Parent peak: Peak 11044 (The Bats Ears)
- Isolation: 5.16 mi (8.30 km)
- Coordinates: 62°49′28″N 151°34′37″W

Naming
- Etymology: Laurens Bubendorfer

Geography
- Location within Alaska
- Interactive map of Mount Laurens
- Country: United States
- State: Alaska
- Borough: Matanuska-Susitna
- Protected area: Denali National Park
- Parent range: Alaska Range
- Topo map: USGS Talkeetna D-4

Climbing
- First ascent: March 1997
- Easiest route: Expedition climbing

Mount Laurens is a 10,042-foot-elevation (3,061-meter) mountain summit in Alaska.

== Description ==
Mount Laurens is located 65 miles (105 km) northwest of Talkeetna in Denali National Park and the Alaska Range. It is set 10.56 mi (17 km) south-southwest of Mount Foraker and 24.23 mi (39 km) southwest of Denali. Topographic relief is significant as the east face rises over 4,500 feet (1,372 meters) in 0.75 mile (1.2 km). The glaciated peak ranks as the 507th-highest summit in Alaska. The first ascent of the summit was made in 1997 by Thomas Bubendorfer, solo, via the north face and west ridge. The mountain's toponym was applied by Thomas Bubendorfer, and the mountain is named after his son, Laurens, 10-years-old at that time. The second ascent, first via the Northeast Buttress, was made on May 21, 2013, by Graham Zimmerman and Mark Allen.

== Climate ==
Based on the Köppen climate classification, Mount Laurens is located in a tundra climate zone with long, cold, snowy winters, and cool summers. Weather systems are forced upwards by the Alaska Range (orographic lift), causing heavy precipitation in the form of snowfall. Winter temperatures can drop below −10 °F with wind chill factors below −20 °F. This climate supports the Yentna Glacier west of the peak and Lacuna Glacier to the east. The months May through June offer the most favorable weather for viewing or climbing.

== Gallery ==
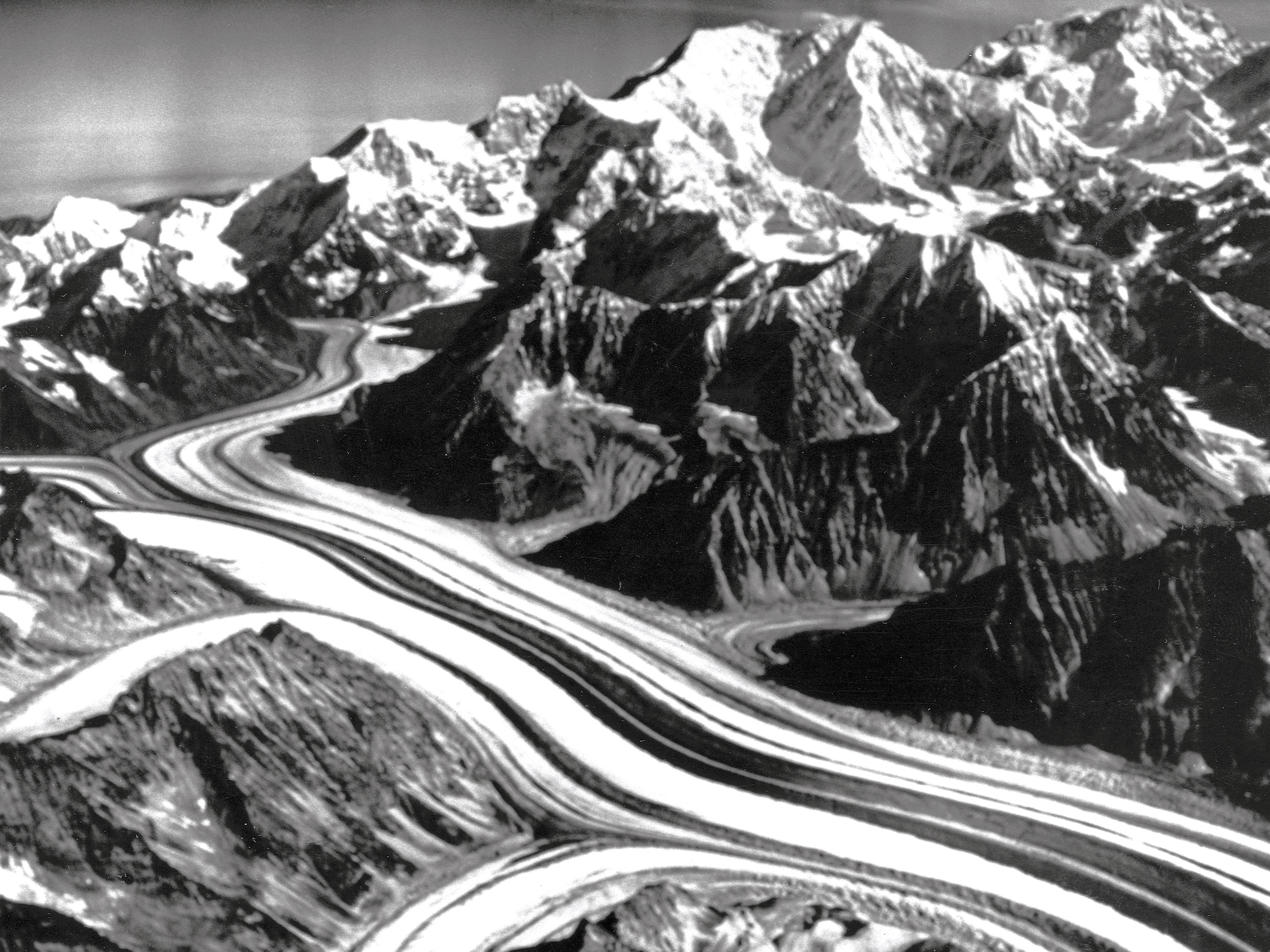
Aerial of Yentna Glacier, Mount Laurens to right and Mount Foraker at top

Aerial view of east aspect

== See also ==
- Mountain peaks of Alaska
- Geography of Alaska
