= Lewis Peak =

Lewis Peak can refer to

- Lewis Peak (Alaska), a peak in the Alaska Range
- Lewis Peak (Montana), a peak in Central Montana
- Lewis Peak (Nevada), a peak in the Shoshone Range of Nevada, near Mount Lewis
- Lewis Peak (New Mexico), a peak in the Guadalupe Mountains of New Mexico
- Lewis Peak (Utah), a peak in the Wasatch Range of Utah
- Lewis Peak (Virginia), a peak in the Shenandoah Mountains of Virginia
- Lewis Peak (Blue Mountains) in the Blue Mountains of Washington
- Lewis Peak (Cascade Range) in the Cascade Range of Washington
- Lewis Peaks in Graham Land, Antarctica
- Dave Lewis Peak in Idaho
