= Scott Peak =

Scott Peak may refer to:

- Scott Peak (Idaho)
- Scott Peak (Alaska)
