= Straightaway =

Straightaway may refer to:

- Straightaway (film), a 1933 American crime drama film
- Straightaway (TV series), a 1961–1962 American adventure drama television series
- "Straightaway" Jazz Themes, a 1961 Maynard Ferguson album containing music he composed for the television series
- Straightaway Glacier, a glacier in Alaska, United States

See also

- Straightaways, a 1997 album by the band Son Volt
