= Gurney Peak (Alaska) =

Mountain in Alaska, United States

- Location within Alaska

Highest point
- Elevation: 7,192 ft (2,192 m)
- Coordinates: 62°24′51″N 152°41′16″W

Geography
- Location: Matanuska-Susitna Borough, Alaska, United States
- Parent range: Alaska Range
- Topo map: USGS Talkeetna B-6

Gurney Peak is a 7,192-foot (2,192 m) spire-shaped peak in the Kichatna Mountains of the Alaska Range, in Denali National Park and Preserve, southwest of Denali. Caldwell and Shadows Glaciers originate from Gurney Peak.

== See also ==
- Mountain peaks of Alaska
