= Augustin Peak (Alaska) =

Mountain in Alaska, United States

- Location within Alaska

Highest point
- Elevation: 8,514 ft (2,595 m)
- Coordinates: 62°25′08″N 152°37′18″W

Geography
- Location: Matanuska-Susitna Borough, Alaska, United States
- Parent range: Alaska Range
- Topo map: USGS Talkeetna B-6

Augustin Peak is an 8,514-foot (2,595 m) spire-shaped peak in the Kichatna Mountains of the Alaska Range, in Denali National Park and Preserve, southwest of Denali.

== See also ==
- Mountain peaks of Alaska
