= Caldwell Glacier =

Glacier in Matanuska-Susitna Borough, Alaska, U.S.

- Location within Alaska
- Interactive map of Caldwell Glacier
- Type: Valley glacier
- Location: Matanuska-Susitna Borough, Alaska, U.S.
- Coordinates: 62°23′36″N 152°39′51″W
- Length: 5 miles (8.0 km)

Caldwell Glacier is a glacier in the Alaska Range of Denali National Park and Preserve in the U.S. state of Alaska. The glacier begins in the Kichatna Mountains at Gurney Peak and Lewis Peak, moving southwest to become a source of the Kichatna River. Named in 1889 by explorer Lt. J.S. Herron, it is 5 miles (8.0 km) long.

== See also ==
- List of glaciers
