= Dall Glacier =

Glacier in Alaska, United States

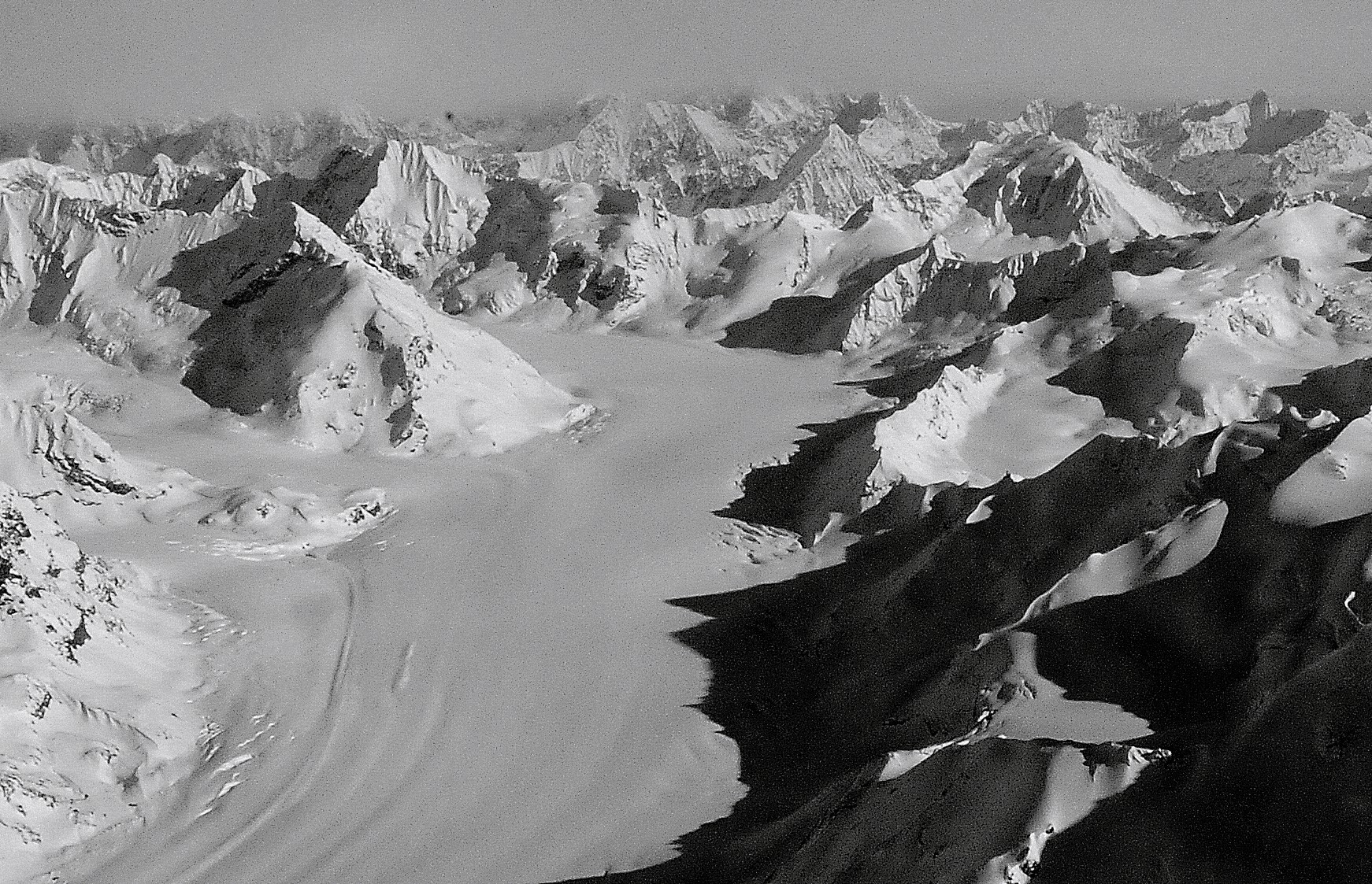
- Aerial view in winter

- Location within Alaska
- Interactive map of Dall Glacier
- Type: Valley glacier
- Location: Matanuska-Susitna Borough, Alaska, U.S.
- Coordinates: 62°33′00″N 151°56′00″W

Dall Glacier is a glacier in Denali National Park and Preserve in the U.S. state of Alaska. The glacier begins in the Alaska Range on Mount Russell, moving southwest, then south to the Yentna River just below the present terminus of Yentna Glacier.

== See also ==
- List of glaciers
