= Kanikula Glacier =

Glacier in Alaska, United States

- Location within Alaska
- Interactive map of Kanikula Glacier
- Type: Valley glacier
- Location: Matanuska-Susitna Borough, Alaska, U.S.
- Coordinates: 62°44′39″N 151°01′11″W
- Length: 11 miles (18 km)

Kanikula Glacier., also known as Little Tokositna Glacier, is an 11-mile-long (18 km) glacier in the Alaska Range of Denali National Park and Preserve in the U.S. state of Alaska. The glacier originates in a series of glacial amphitheaters in the south side of the range, moving southeast past Mount Goldie and ending before the valley of Tokositna Glacier. Variant forms and spellings of the name include K'enik'ela Li'a, Kahnicula Glacier, Kanicula Glacier and Little Tokasitna Glacier.

== See also ==
- List of glaciers
