= Kahiltna Peaks =

Mountain in Alaska, United States

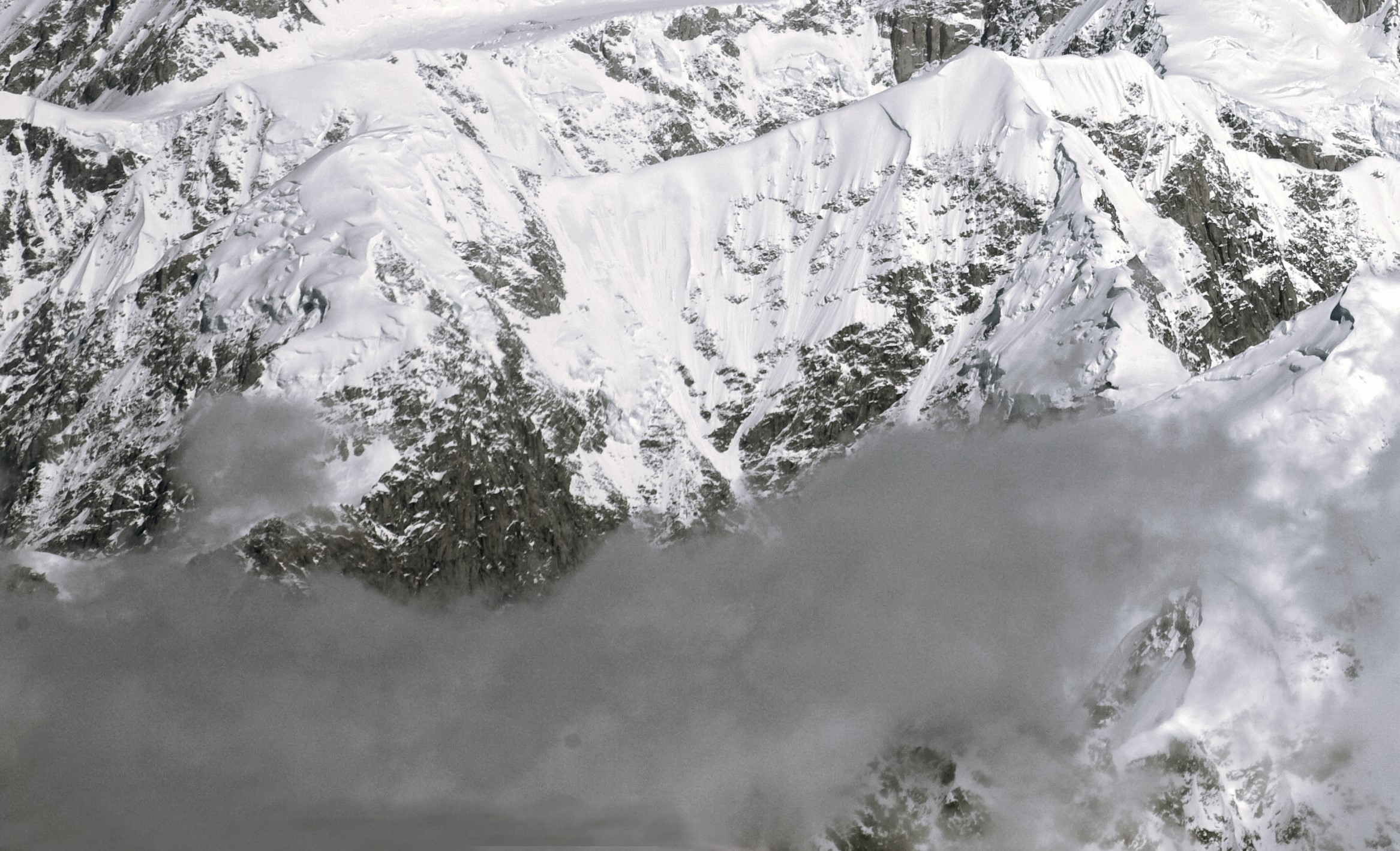
- South aspect, aerial view

Highest point
- Elevation: 13,440 ft (4,100 m)
- Prominence: 1,480 ft (450 m)
- Parent peak: Denali
- Coordinates: 63°01′43″N 151°05′00″W

Geography
- Location within Alaska
- Location: Denali Borough, Alaska, United States
- Parent range: Alaska Range
- Topo map: USGS Mount McKinley A-3

The Kahiltna Peaks are two prominent summits on a western spur of Denali in the central Alaska Range, in Denali National Park. The 13,440-foot (4,100 m) east peak and the 12,835-foot (3,912 m) west peak are separated from the main Denali massif by Kahiltna Notch, between the northeast and east forks of Kahiltna Glacier.

== Gallery ==
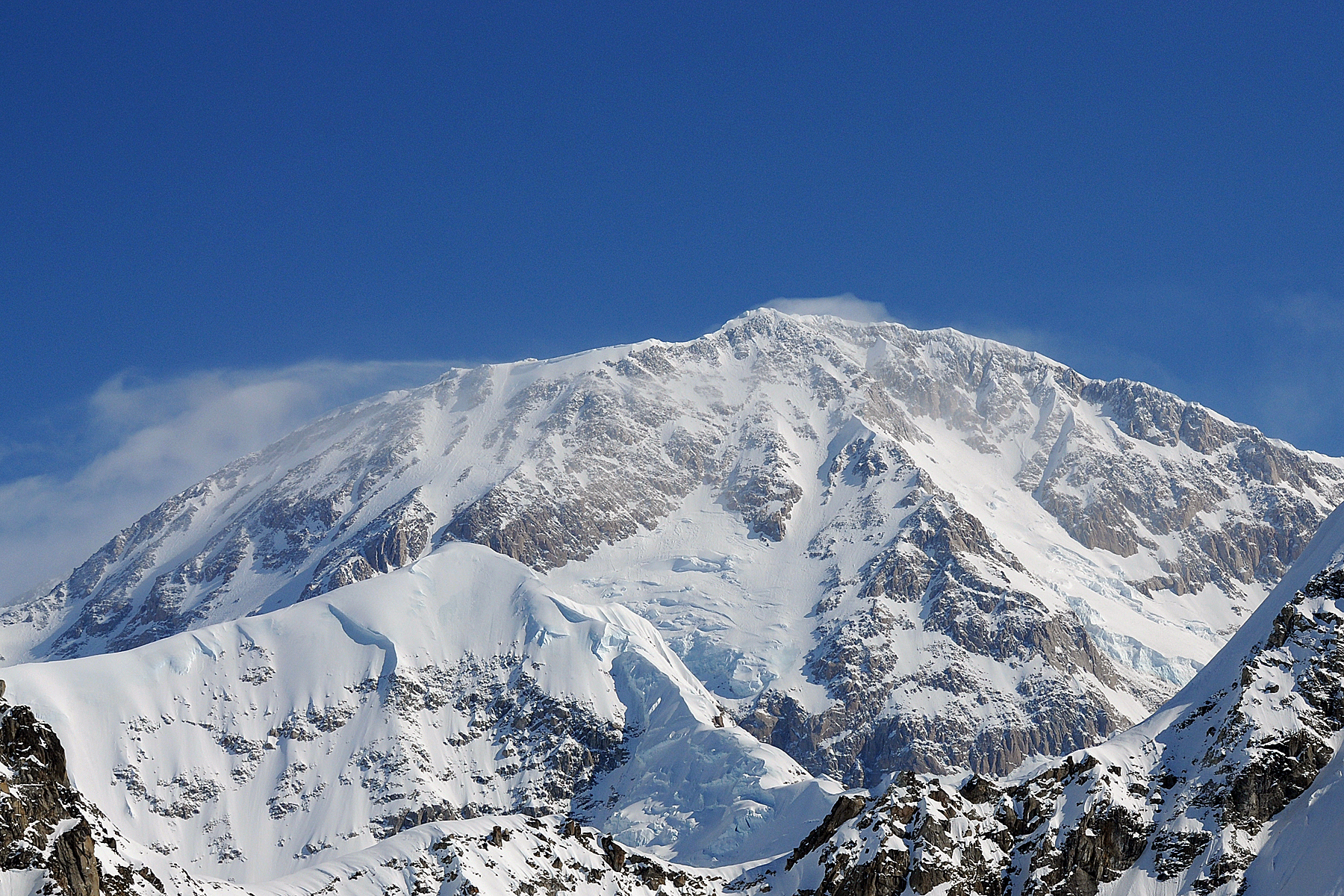
East peak of Kahiltna Peaks in lower left, with Denali centered

== See also ==
- Mountain peaks of Alaska
- Kahiltna Queen
