= Mount Frances =

Mountain in Alaska, United States

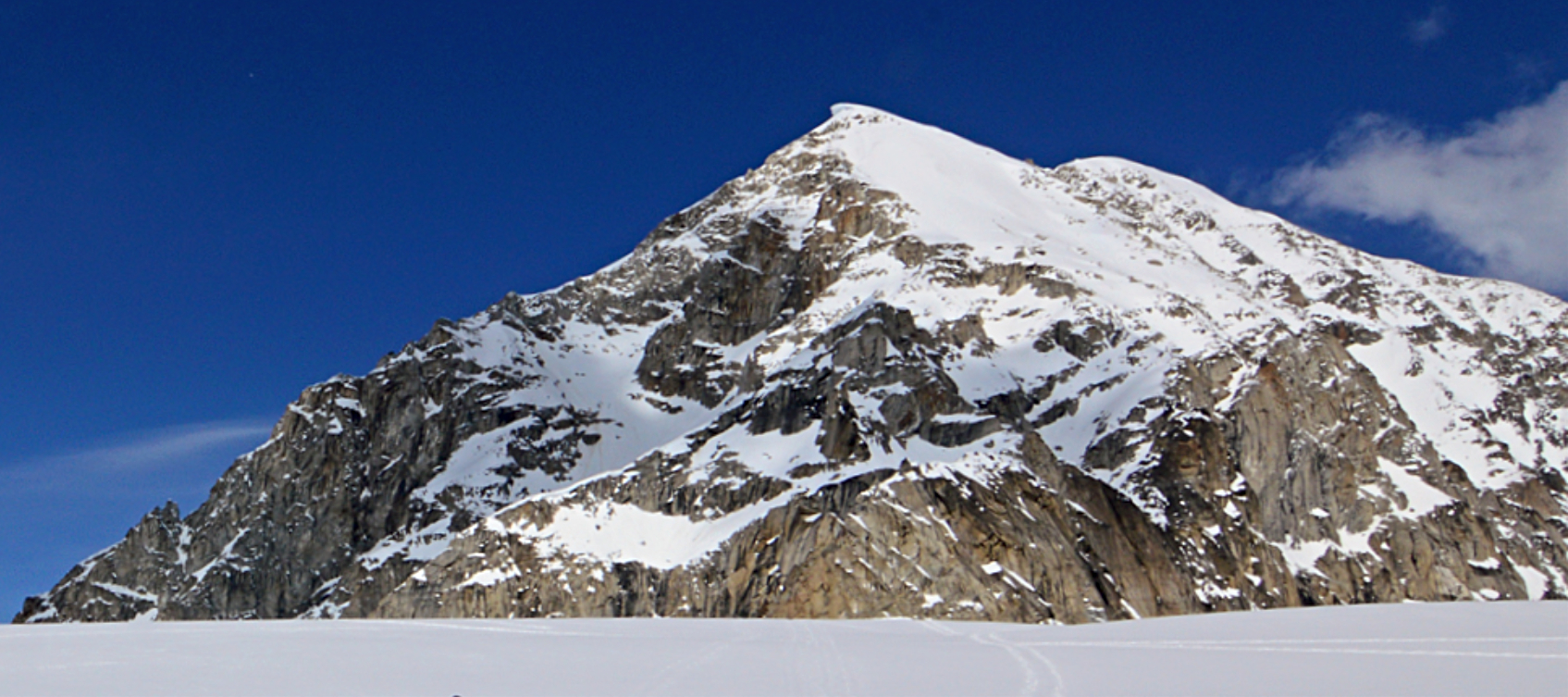
- Mount Frances, south aspect

Highest point
- Elevation: 10,450 ft (3,190 m)
- Prominence: 1,650 ft (500 m)
- Coordinates: 62°59′19″N 151°09′45″W

Geography
- Location within Alaska
- Interactive map of Mount Frances
- Location: Denali Borough; Alaska, United States
- Parent range: Alaska Range
- Topo map: USGS Talkeetna D-3

Geology
- Rock type: Granite

Mount Frances is a 10,450 ft (3,190 m) mountain summit located in the Kahiltna Glacier valley in the Alaska Range, in Denali National Park and Preserve, in the U.S. state of Alaska. It is situated north of the Kahiltna Glacier base camp for mountaineers attempting to climb Denali, Mount Foraker, or Mount Hunter. The summit of Mt. Frances is the best viewpoint from which to see all three giants from one location. Mount Frances is set 7.43 mi (12 km) southwest of Denali, 3.47 mi (6 km) northwest of Mount Hunter, and 1.3 mi (2 km) northwest of Radio Control Tower. Access to the area is via air taxi from Talkeetna. The mountain's name honors Frances Randall (1925-1984), the first Denali Base Camp manager for nine climbing seasons (1974-1983). She was planning a tenth season, but cancer claimed her life. Her expertise was instrumental in coordinating many rescues that saved lives and earned her the nicknames Guardian Angel of McKinley, and Kahiltna Queen. She was a member of the Fairbanks Symphony Orchestra, often playing the violin at base camp over the CB radio. In 1964 she became the sixth woman to reach the summit of Mount McKinley.

== Climbing ==
Alpine routes at Mount Frances

- Scratch and Sniff - class 5.8
- Southwest Ridge - class 5.8
- South East Ridge - WI2

== Gallery ==
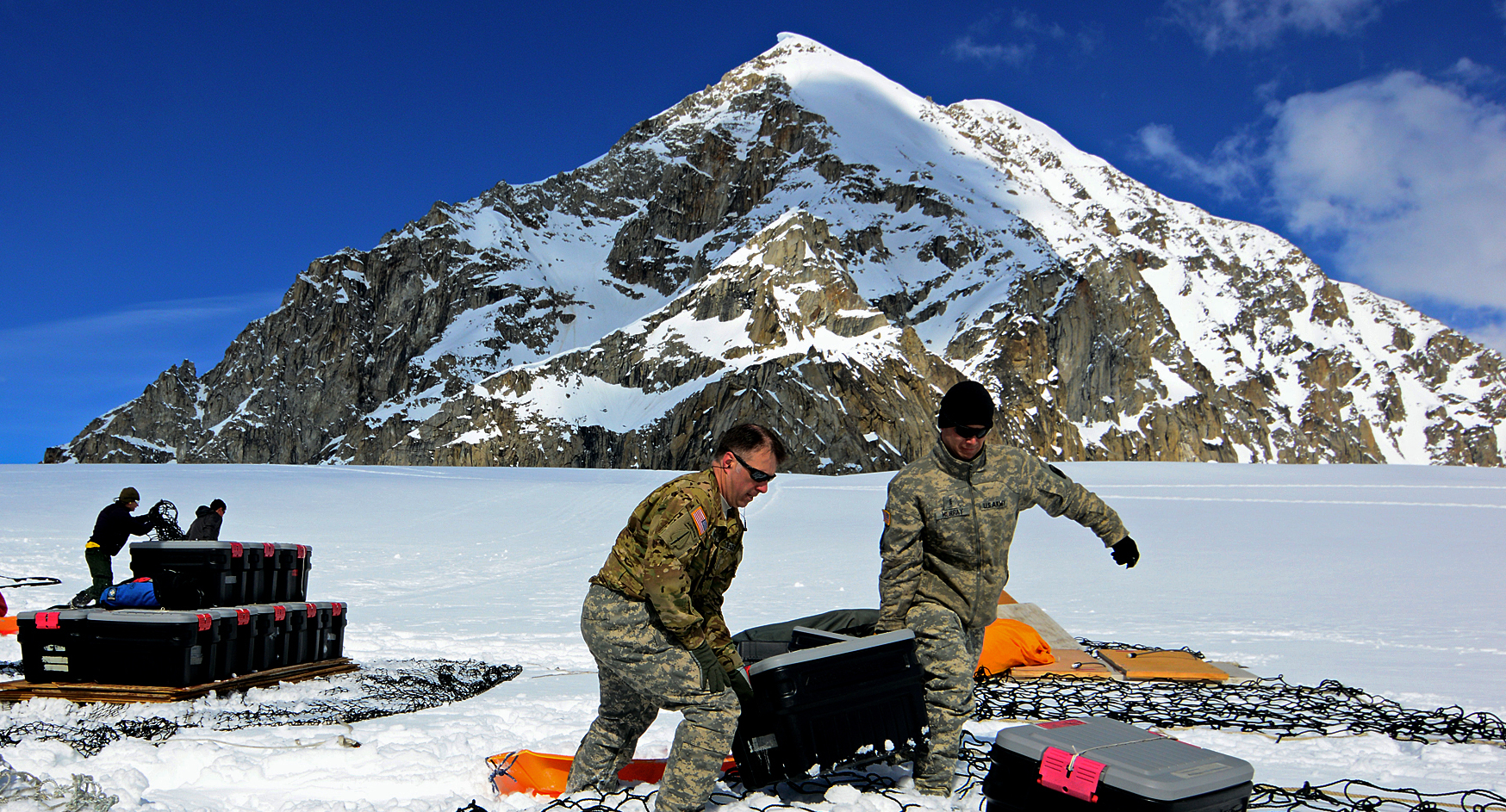
Mount Frances seen behind US Army supplying Kahiltna Glacier Basecamp

== See also ==
- Kahiltna Queen
- Mountain peaks of Alaska
