= Radio Control Tower =

Mountain summit in Alaska, U.S.

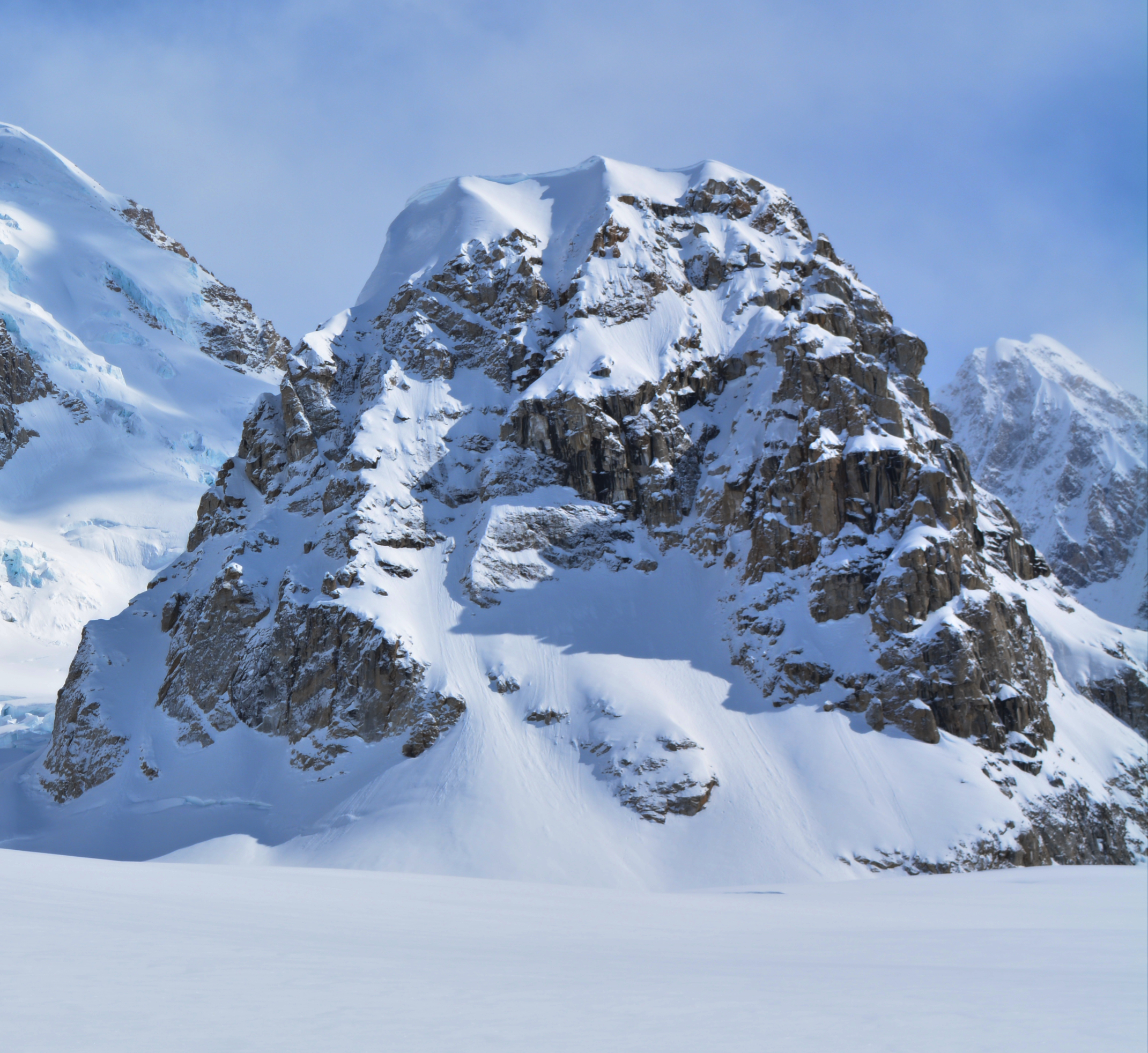
- The west face of Radio Control Tower

Highest point
- Elevation: 8,670 ft (2,640 m)
- Coordinates: 62°58′23″N 151°08′21″W

Geography
- Location within Alaska
- Location: Denali Borough; Alaska, United States
- Parent range: Alaska Range
- Topo map: USGS Talkeetna D-3

Geology
- Rock type: Granite

Climbing
- Easiest route: East Ridge

Radio Control Tower is an 8,670 ft (2,640 m) elevation nunatak located in the Southeast Fork Kahiltna Glacier valley in the Alaska Range, in Denali National Park and Preserve, in the U.S. state of Alaska. It is situated west of the Kahiltna base camp for mountaineers attempting to climb Denali or Mount Hunter. Access to the area is via air taxi from Talkeetna. Radio Control Tower is set 7.86 mi (13 km) south of Denali, 2.17 mi (3 km) northwest of Mount Hunter, and 1.3 mi (2 km) southeast of Mount Frances.

== Climate ==
Based on the Köppen climate classification, Radio Control Tower is located in a subarctic climate zone with long, cold, snowy winters, and cool summers. Temperatures can drop below −20 °C with wind chill factors below −30 °C. The months May through June offer the most favorable weather for climbing or viewing.

== Gallery ==
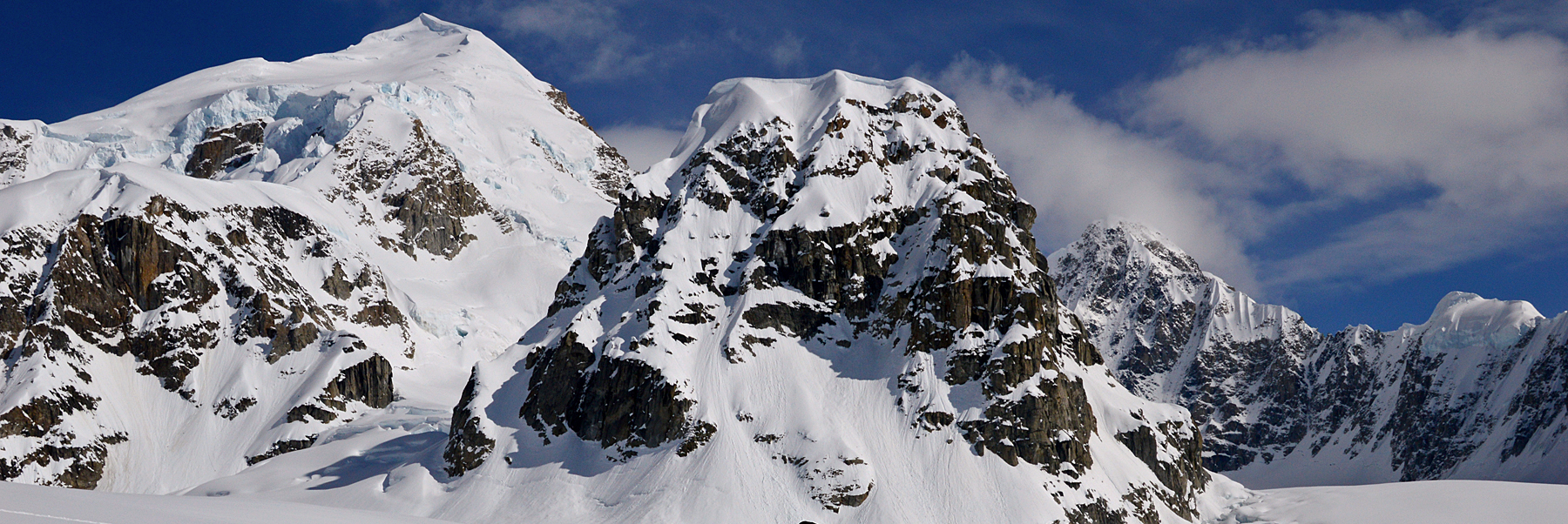
Radio Control Tower centered

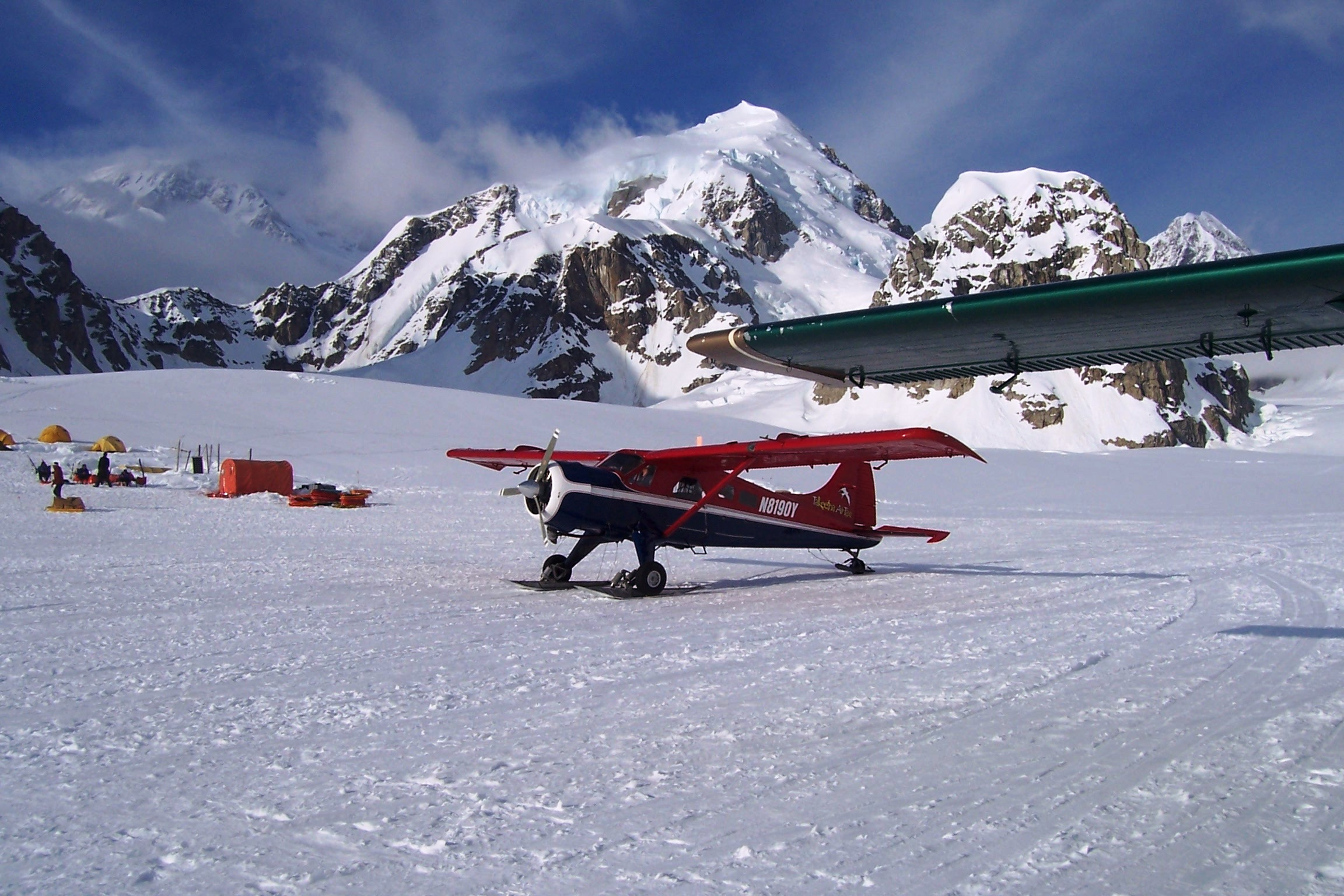
Kahiltna base camp with Radio Control Tower to right behind wing
