= Surprise Glacier (Alaska Range) =

Glacier in Alaska, United States

- Location within Alaska
- Interactive map of Surprise Glacier
- Type: Valley glacier
- Location: Matanuska-Susitna Borough, Alaska, U.S.
- Coordinates: 62°41′55″N 152°18′27″W

Surprise Glacier is a glacier in Denali National Park and Preserve in the U.S. state of Alaska. The glacier begins in the Alaska Range near Mount Dall, moving west. Its terminus is the source of the Tonzona River.

== See also ==
- List of glaciers
