= Scott Peak (Alaska) =

Mountain in Alaska, United States

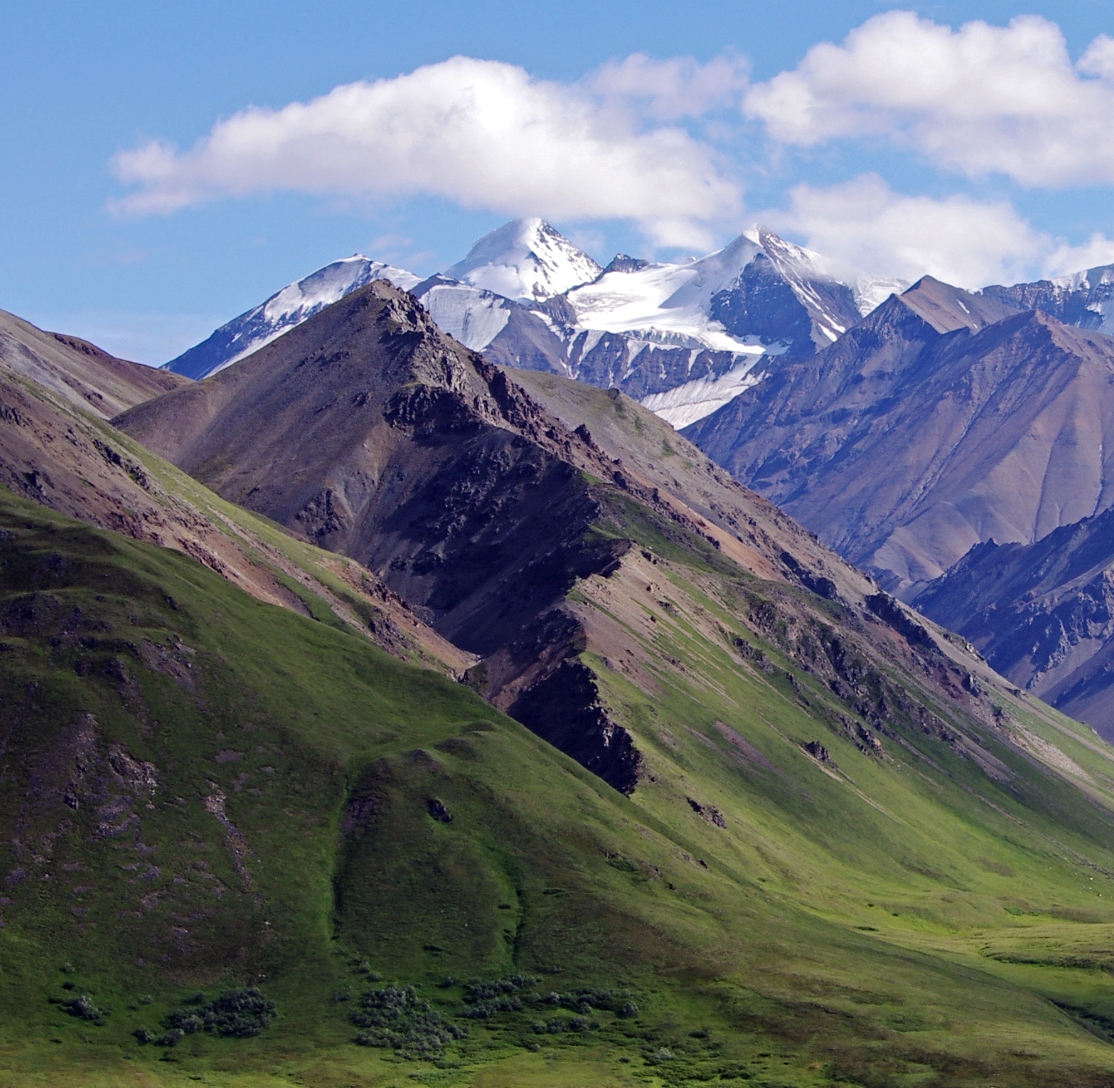
- Scott Peak's snowy summit pyramid in back seen from Eielson Visitor Center

Highest point
- Elevation: 8,828 ft (2,691 m)
- Prominence: 3,428 ft (1,045 m)
- Parent peak: Mount Mather (12,096 ft)
- Isolation: 9.96 mi (16.03 km)
- Coordinates: 63°20′41″N 150°07′33″W

Geography
- Location within Alaska
- Interactive map of Scott Peak
- Location: Denali Borough; Alaska, United States
- Parent range: Alaska Range
- Topo map: USGS Denali B-1

Climbing
- First ascent: 1953
- Easiest route: Sunset Glacier

Scott Peak is an 8,828 ft (2,690 m) glaciated mountain summit located in Denali National Park and Preserve, on the crest of the Alaska Range, in the U.S. state of Alaska. It is situated 9 mi (14 km) southeast of the Eielson Visitor Center, at the head of the Sunset Glacier, and 33.5 mi (54 km) northeast of Denali. This mountain was named in 1953 by Reynold E. (Pete) Isto of the U.S. Geological Survey and Bradford Washburn to honor Lieutenant Gordon D. Scott (1925–1953), a surveyor for the United States Coast and Geodetic Survey who was killed in a plane crash during mapping operations of this area. Scott Peak is set ten miles south of where the crash occurred near the Stony Creek Bridge area of the park road on June 11, 1953. Established climbing routes on Scott Peak include the Northeast Face, Northwest Face, and the Sunset Glacier. The first ascent of this peak was made in 1953 by Bradford Washburn.

== Climate ==
Based on the Köppen climate classification, Scott Peak is located in a subarctic climate zone with long, cold, snowy winters, and mild summers. Temperatures can drop below −20 °C with wind chill factors below −30 °C. This climate supports glaciers on it slopes including the Sunrise Glacier and Sunset Glacier. Precipitation runoff from the north side of the mountain drains into tributaries of the McKinley River, which in turn is part of in the Tanana River drainage basin. The Chulitna River drains the south side of the peak. The months May through June offer the most favorable weather for climbing or viewing.

== Gallery ==
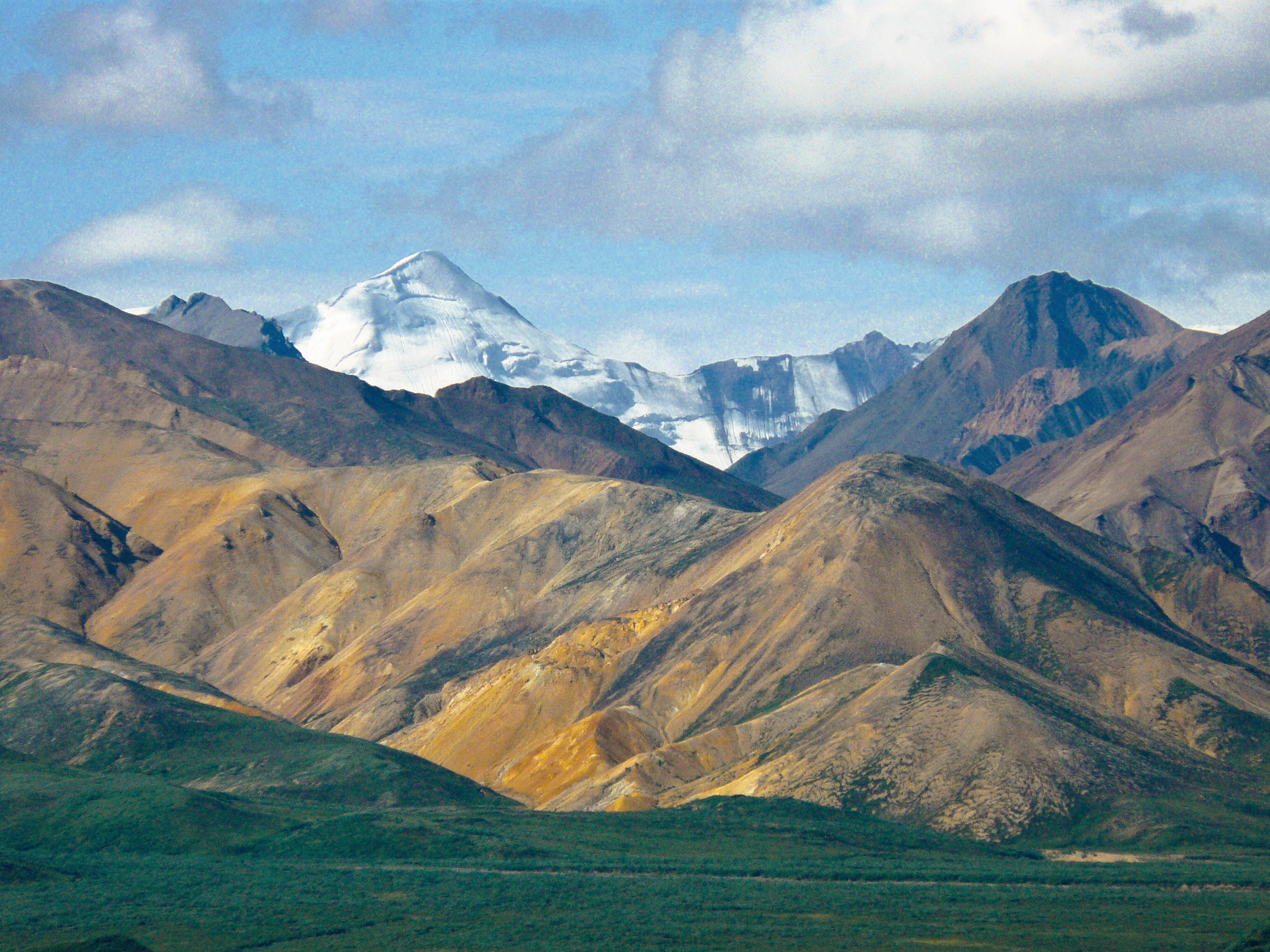
Scott Peak (snow-capped)

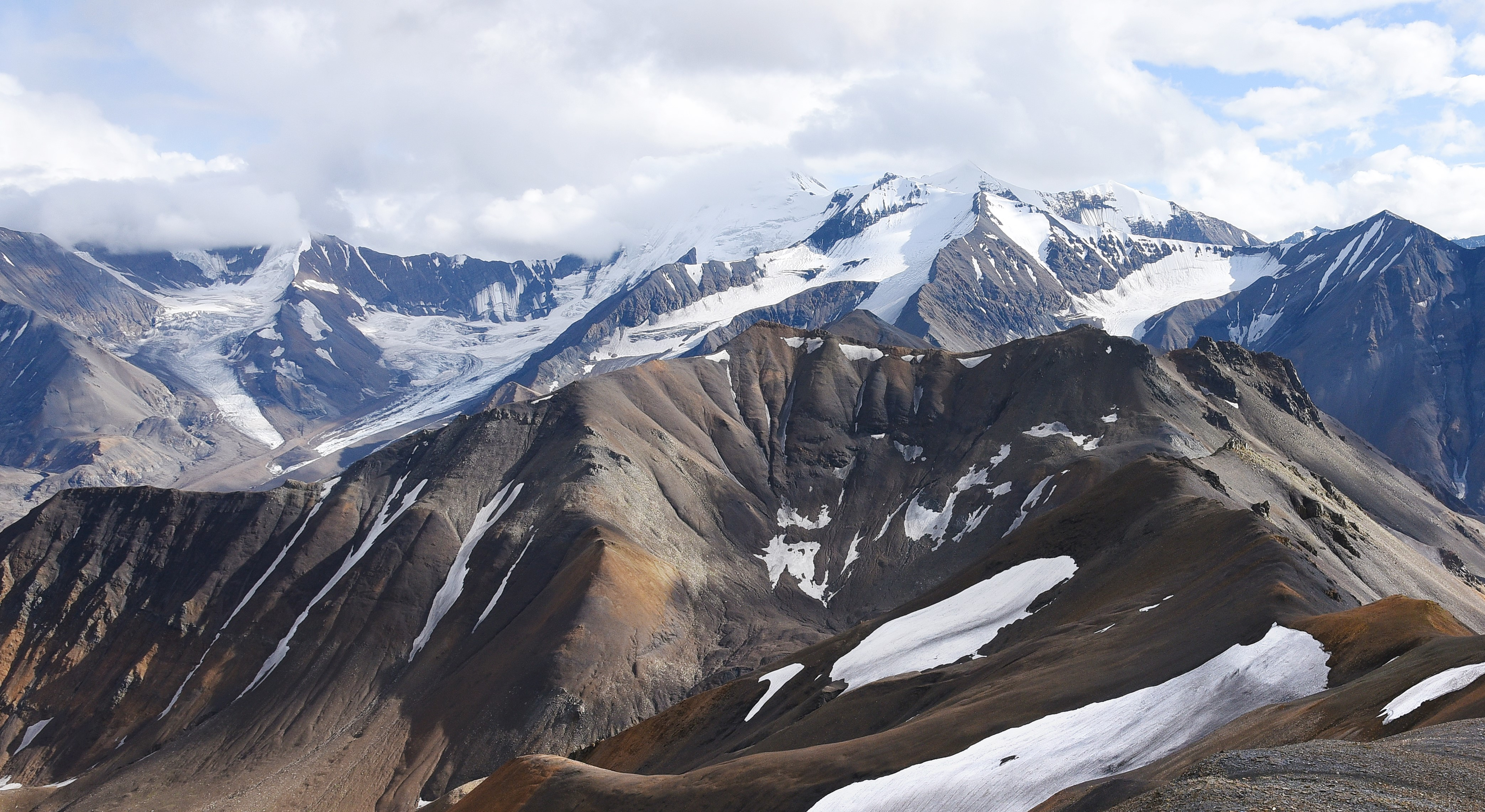
View from Green Dome looking south toward Scott Peak with summit partially shrouded in cloud.

== See also ==
- Mount Isto
- Geology of Alaska
