= Lewis Peak (Alaska) =

Mountain in Alaska, United States

- Location within Alaska

Highest point
- Elevation: 6,624 ft (2,019 m)
- Coordinates: 62°23′52″N 152°41′16″W

Geography
- Location: Matanuska-Susitna Borough, Alaska, United States
- Parent range: Alaska Range
- Topo map: USGS Talkeetna B-6

Lewis Peak is a 6,624-foot (2,019 m) spire-shaped peak in the Kichatna Mountains of the Alaska Range, in Denali National Park and Preserve, southwest of Denali.

== See also ==
- Mountain peaks of Alaska
