= Chedotlothna Glacier =

Glacier in Alaska, United States

- Location within Alaska
- Interactive map of Chedotlothna Glacier
- Type: Valley glacier
- Location: Denali Borough, Alaska
- Coordinates: 62°52′N 151°52′W

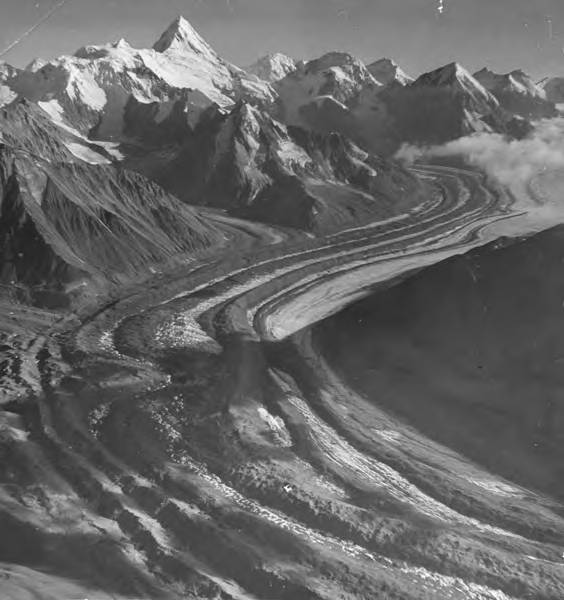
Chedotlothna Glacier in August 1957

Chedotlothna Glacier is a glacier in Denali National Park and Preserve in the U.S. state of Alaska. The glacier begins in the Alaska Range between Mount Russell and Mount Dall moving northeast, then north. It is the source of the Swift Fork of the Kuskokwim River. The name Chedotlothna was reported as a native name by S.R. Capps in 1925. Alternate spellings include Chedotlothno and Chedotluthna. The glacier is also called Todzolno' Lughwzra'.

== See also ==
- List of glaciers
