= Sunrise Glacier (Alaska) =

Glacier in Alaska, United States

- Location within Alaska
- Interactive map of Sunrise Glacier
- Type: Valley glacier
- Location: Denali Borough, Alaska, U.S.
- Coordinates: 63°21′49″N 150°10′06″W

Sunrise Glacier is a glacier in the Alaska Range of Denali National Park and Preserve in the U.S. state of Alaska. The glacier originates near Scott Peak, moving northwest. It is the source of Sunrise Creek. Sunset Glacier is nearby.

== Geography ==
The Sunrise Glacier is a high-alpine mountain glacier located in Unit 12 of the Alaska Range of Denali National Park and Preserve in the U.S. state of Alaska. It is situated southeast of the Thorofare River, which winds its way north from the basins of the Sunrise Glacier and the Sunset Glacier. The areas surrounding the Sunrise and Sunset Glaciers are often less-traveled, however, they offer many exploration opportunities compared to other units of the Alaska Range. The glacier has an approximate area of 0.35 square miles has an elevation of 6,332 feet (1,930 meters). It also trends NW to its 1954 terminus at the head of Sunrise Creek, about 5 miles southeast of the Eielson Visitor Center.

== History ==
The Sunrise Glacier was officially named in 1932 by J. C. Reed Sr. and S. N. Stoner at the U.S. Board on Geographic Names. This name was chosen as the glacier sits on the Sunrise Creek fork of the Thorofare River. The naming of the Sunrise Glacier was part of a larger effort to survey and map the new Mount Mckinley National Park (now called Denali National Park and Preserve). The glacier is a product of the Quaternary period (the last 2.6 million years). The path it is embedded in was carved out during four major glaciation periods which covered a majority of the Denali in ice. It is thought that the valley it sits in today was finalized during the Great Ice Age roughly 10,000 to 12,000 years ago.

== Tourism ==
When visiting the Sunrise Glacier, most visitors are directed towards the Eielson Visitor Center at Mile 66 of the Park Road. However, there are no official trails that lead directly to the glacier. Some key attractions of Unit 12 of Denali National Park and Preserve include sightings of grizzly bears, caribou, and Dall sheep. Hikers in the area must be aware of the dangers of the Thorofare River, which can flow especially fast on warm days due to increased glacial melt.

== See also ==
- List of glaciers
