= Shelf Glacier =

Glacier in Alaska, United States

- Location within Alaska
- Interactive map of Shelf Glacier
- Type: Valley glacier
- Location: Matanuska-Susitna Borough, Alaska, U.S.
- Coordinates: 62°27′33″N 152°43′58″W

Shelf Glacier is a glacier in the Alaska Range of Denali National Park and Preserve in the U.S. state of Alaska. The glacier begins in the Kichatna Mountains on the side of Kichatna Spire, moving north. It is a tributary to neighboring Shadows Glacier, which with Cul-de-sac Glacier feeds the west fork of the Yentna River.

== See also ==
- List of glaciers
