= Fleischmann Glacier =

Glacier in Alaska, United States

- Location within Alaska
- Interactive map of Fleischmann Glacier
- Type: Valley glacier
- Location: Matanuska-Susitna Borough, Alaska, U.S.
- Coordinates: 62°21′13″N 152°50′25″W
- Length: 1 mile (1.6 km)

Fleischmann Glacier is a glacier in the Alaska Range of Denali National Park and Preserve in the U.S. state of Alaska. The glacier lies in the southern Kichatna Mountains above Simpson Pass, moving south. It the source of Morris Creek, which feeds the Kichatna River.

== See also ==
- List of glaciers
