= Kichatna Mountains =

Mountain range in Alaska, United States

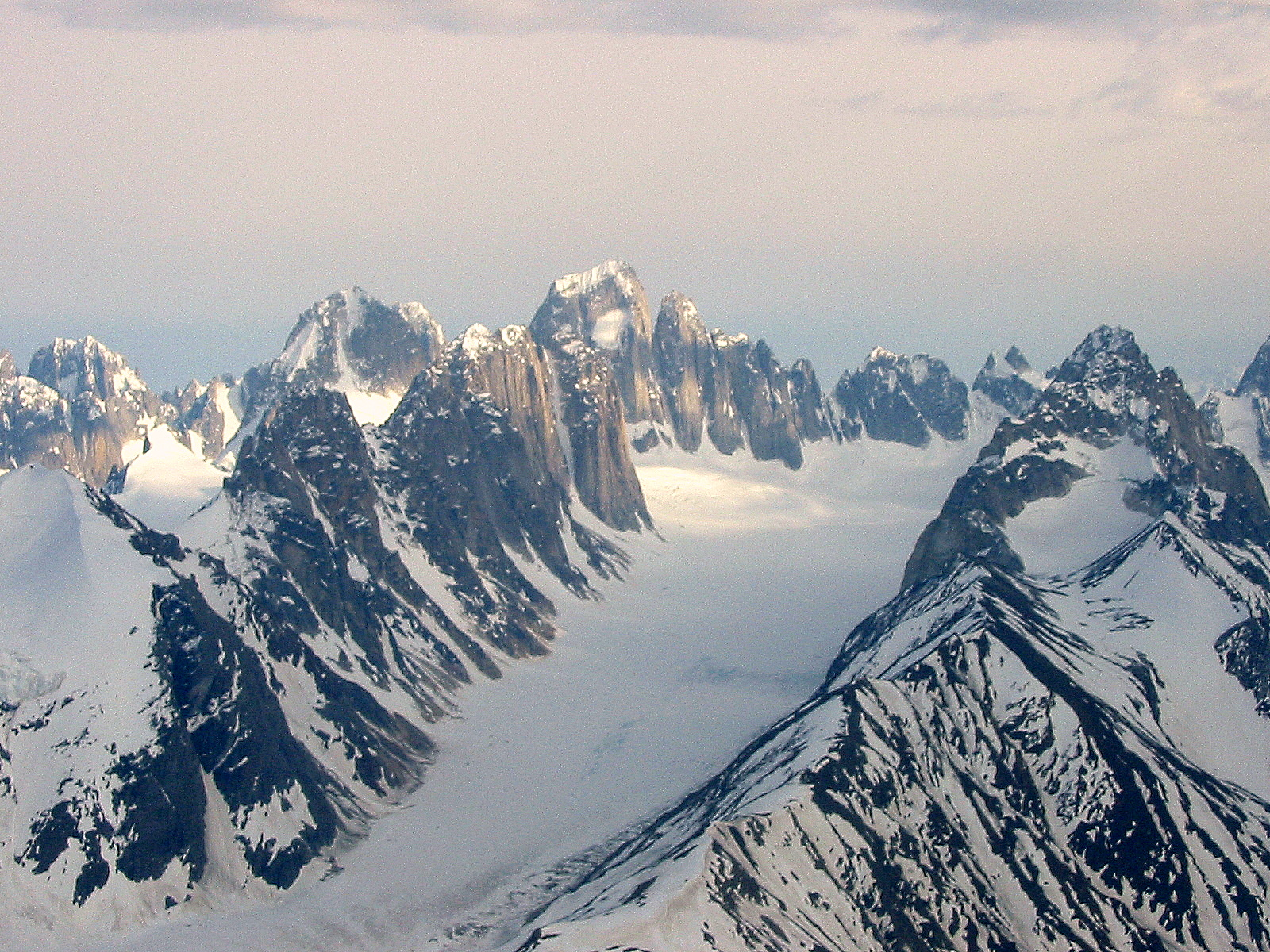
- The Kichatna Peaks

Highest point
- Peak: Kichatna Spire, Mount Augustin
- Elevation: 8,985 feet (2,739 m)
- Coordinates: 62°26′06″N 152°42′53″W

Geography
- Location within Alaska
- Country: United States
- Region: Matanuska-Susitna Borough

The Kichatna Mountains are a small mountain range in the northwestern part of Matanuska-Susitna Borough of the U.S. state of Alaska, approximately 70 miles (110 km) southwest of Denali. Unlike the major snow peaks of much of the rest of the Alaska Range, the Kichatnas boast short, steep rock towers, which are famous both for their high-quality, highly technical climbing, and their terrible weather.

The main peaks of the Kichatnas include:

- Kichatna Spire, 8985 feet
- Augustin Peak
- Gurney Peak, 8400 feet
- Middle Triple Peak, 8835 feet
- The Citadel, 8520 feet

Named glaciers in the Kichatnas include

- Caldwell Glacier
- Cul-de-sac Glacier
- Fleischmann Glacier
- Shadows Glacier
- Shelf Glacier
- Tatina Glacier

Most of the glaciers originate from the Cathedral Spires arrête.

== Gallery ==
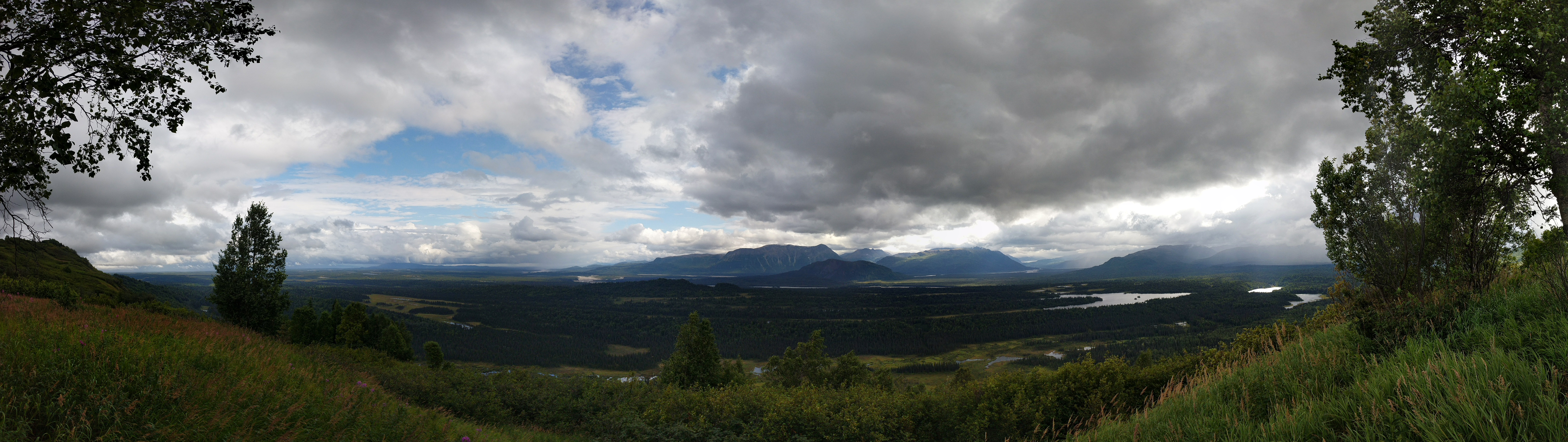
Panorama taken from close to the furthest southeastern extension of the Kichatna Mountain range, showing Skwentna River
