= Sunset Glacier =

Glacier in Alaska, United States

- Location within Alaska
- Interactive map of Sunset Glacier
- Type: Valley glacier
- Location: Denali Borough, Alaska, U.S.
- Coordinates: 63°19′40.14″N 150°11′08.01″W

Sunset Glacier is a glacier in the Alaska Range of Denali National Park and Preserve in the U.S. state of Alaska. The glacier originates near Scott Peak, moving southwest, then northwest. Sunrise Glacier is nearby.

== See also ==
- List of glaciers
