= Cul-de-sac Glacier =

Glacier in Alaska, United States

- Location within Alaska
- Interactive map of Cul-de-sac Glacier
- Type: Valley glacier
- Location: Matanuska-Susitna Borough, Alaska, U.S.
- Coordinates: 62°27′31″N 152°46′07″W

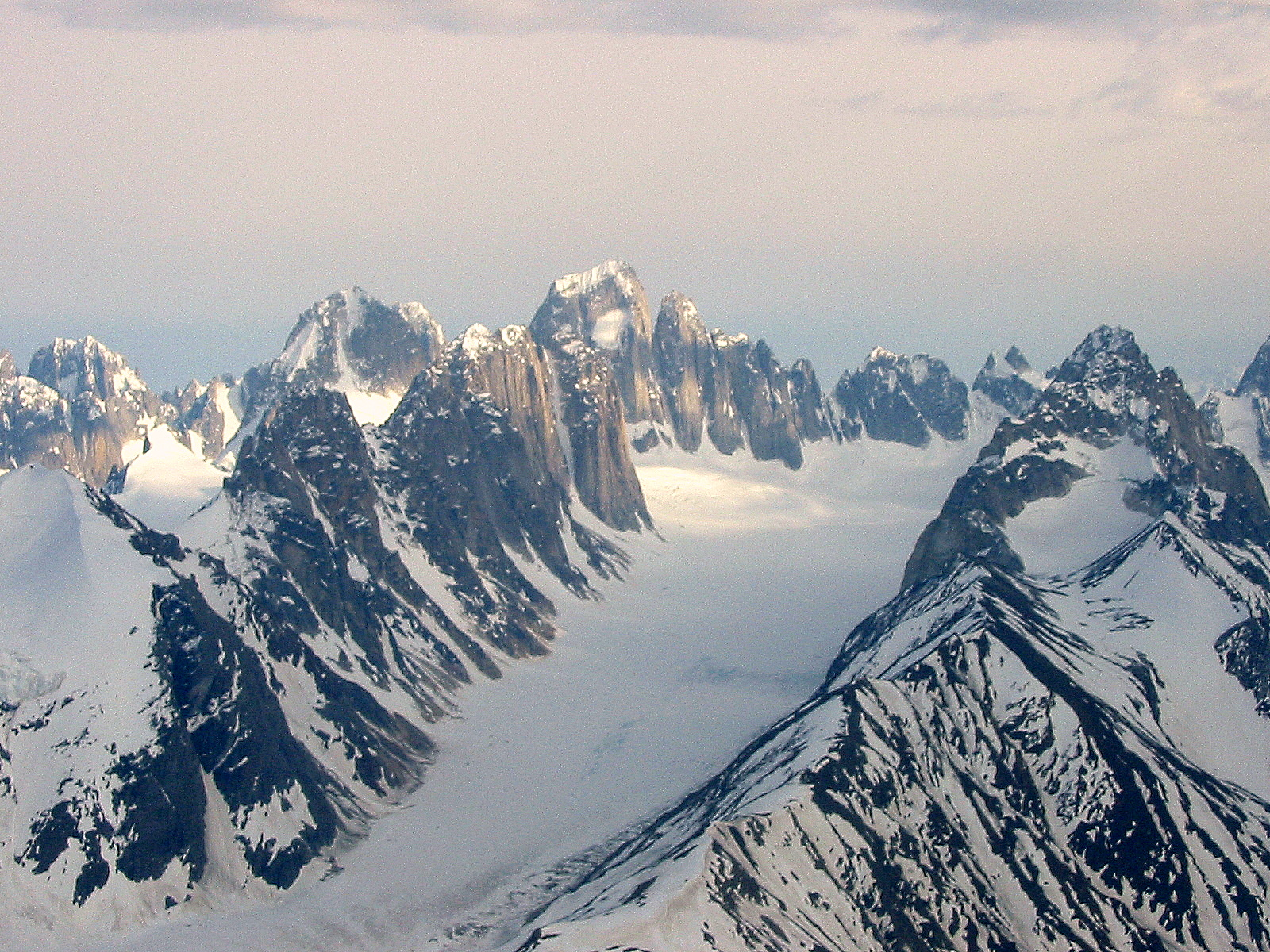
Kichatna Peaks in the glacier

Cul-de-sac Glacier is a glacier in the Alaska Range of Denali National Park and Preserve in the U.S. state of Alaska. The glacier begins in the Kichatna Mountains on the side of Kichatna Spire, moving north. Its run-off and that of neighboring Shelf and Shadows glaciers feeds the west fork of the Yentna River.

== See also ==
- List of glaciers
