= Tatina Glacier =

Glacier in Alaska, United States

- Location within Alaska
- Interactive map of Tatina Glacier
- Type: Valley glacier
- Location: Matanuska-Susitna Borough, Alaska, U.S.
- Coordinates: 62°27′03″N 152°48′44″W

Tatina Glacier is a glacier in the Alaska Range of Denali National Park and Preserve in the U.S. state of Alaska. The glacier begins in the Kichatna Mountains on the north side of the Cathedral Spires, moving northeast. Its run-off is the source of the Tatina River.

== See also ==
- List of glaciers
