= Yentna Glacier =

Glacier in Alaska, United States

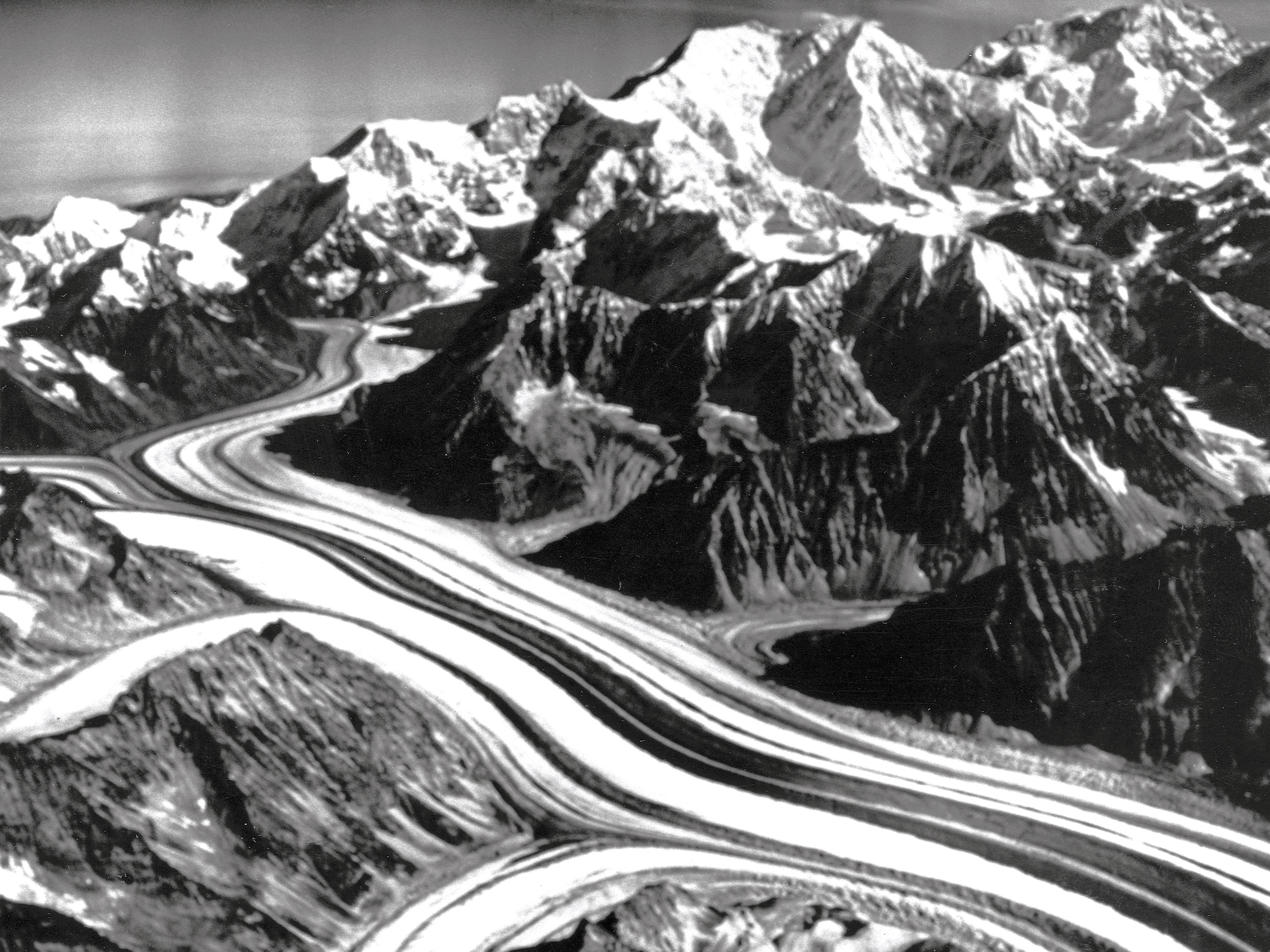
- Aerial view of Yentna Glacier (Mts. Laurens and Foraker to the right)

- Location within Alaska
- Interactive map of Yentna Glacier
- Type: Valley glacier
- Location: Matanuska-Susitna Borough, Alaska, U.S.
- Coordinates: 62°43′07″N 151°40′57″W

Yentna Glacier is a glacier in Denali National Park and Preserve in the U.S. state of Alaska. The glacier begins in the Alaska Range between Mount Russell and Mount Foraker, moving southwest. It is the source of the east fork of the Yentna River. Lacuna Glacier is a major tributary, and Dall Glacier enters the glacial valley just below Yentna Glacier's present terminus.

== See also ==
- List of glaciers
