= Lacuna Glacier =

Glacier in Alaska, United States

- Location within Alaska
- Interactive map of Lacuna Glacier
- Type: Valley glacier
- Location: Matanuska-Susitna Borough, Alaska, U.S.
- Coordinates: 62°44′53″N 151°29′46″W

Lacuna Glacier is a glacier in Denali National Park and Preserve in the U.S. state of Alaska. The glacier begins on the south side of Mount Foraker in the Alaska Range, moving southwest to join the Yentna Glacier, to which Lacuna is a tributary.

== See also ==
- List of glaciers
