= Mount Russell (Alaska) =

Mountain in Alaska, United States

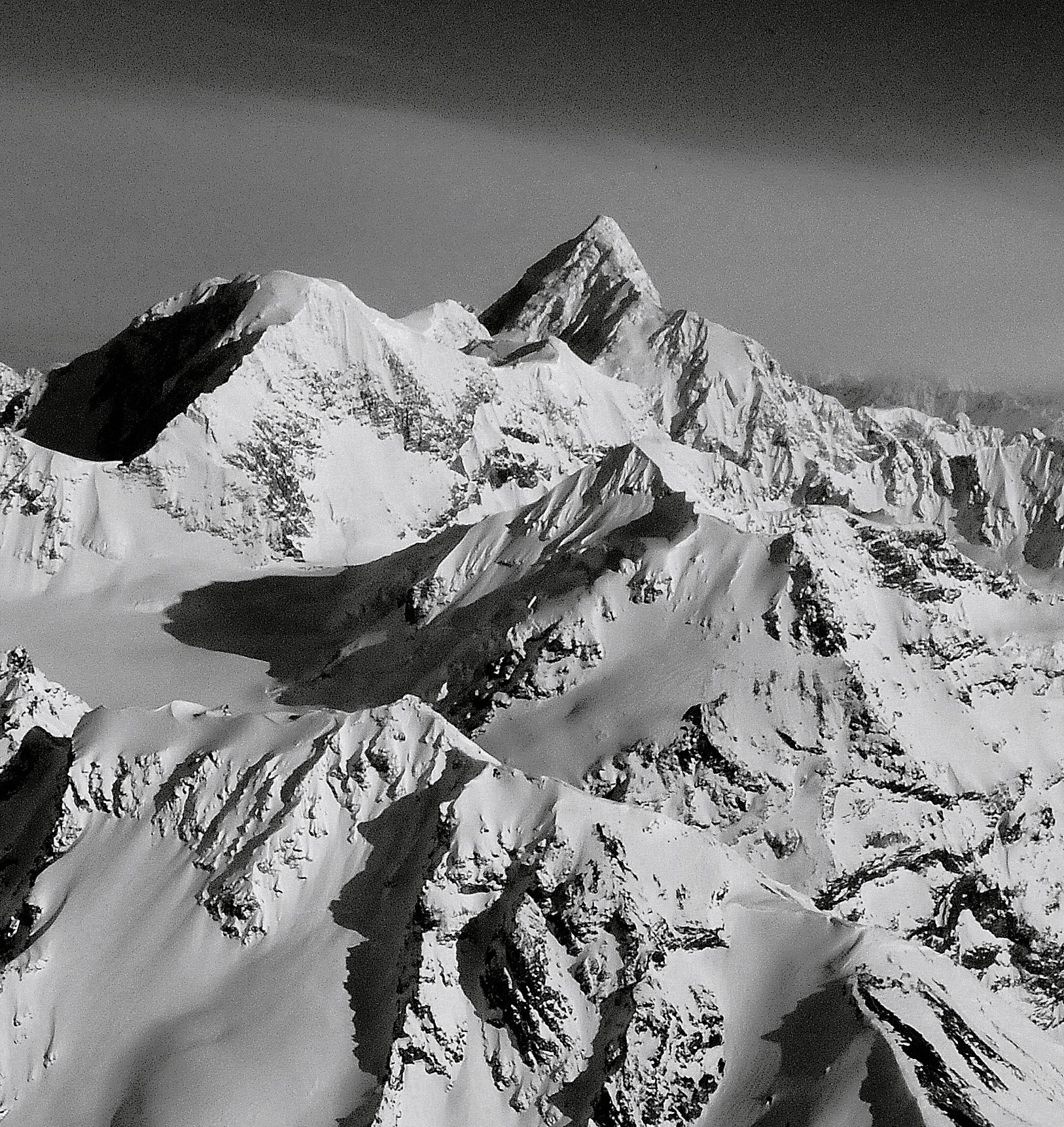
- Aerial view, southwest aspect

Highest point
- Elevation: 11,670 ft (3,560 m)
- Prominence: 5,550 ft (1,690 m)
- Listing: US most prominent peaks 90th
- Coordinates: 62°47′56″N 151°52′55″W

Naming
- Etymology: Israel Russell (1852–1906)

Geography
- Location within Alaska
- Location: Alaska, United States
- Parent range: Central Alaska Range
- Topo map: USGS Talkeetna D-4

Climbing
- First ascent: 1962 by Klaus Ekkerlein, Robert Goodwin, Peter Hennig
- Easiest route: North ridge

Mount Russell is one of the major peaks of the central Alaska Range, approximately 35 mi (56 km) southwest of Denali. Though much lower than Denali or its neighbor Mount Foraker, Russell is a steep, dramatic peak and a significant mountaineering challenge in its own right. To give a sense of its size and steepness, note that its summit rises 6,560 ft (2,000 m) over the Chedotlothna Glacier to the northwest in only 1.8 mi (2.9 km), and almost 10,000 ft (3,000 m) above the lower Yentna Glacier to the south in only 8 mi (13 km).

Mount Russell is the highest point in the Kuskokwim River watershed.

The first ascent of Mount Russell was made on May 28, 1962, by a party led by Hellmut Raithel. The summit party comprised Klaus Ekkerlein, Robert Goodwin, and Peter Hennig. They ascended the West Face from the Chedotlothna Glacier. The second ascent was in July 1972, by Thomas Kensler, Peter Brown, John Hauck, Dick Jablonowski, and Daniel L. Osborne. That ascent proceeded via the now-standard North East Ridge route, from the high basin of the upper Yentna Glacier to the northeast of the peak. This route is rated at Alaska Grade 2+, and is made much shorter by the feasibility of landing at around 8,000 feet in the basin, just outside the wilderness portion of the park.

Overshadowed as it is by its larger neighbors, Mount Russell had seen only six recorded ascents by 2001. However guided climbs of the peak are available.

== Gallery ==
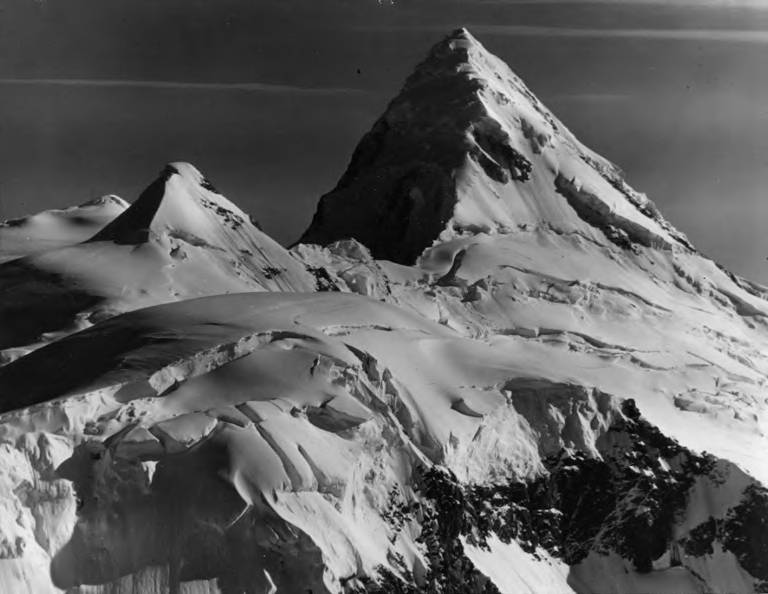
Southwest aspect, August 8, 1957

East aspect

== See also ==
- List of mountain peaks of North America
  - List of mountain peaks of the United States
    - List of mountain peaks of Alaska
- List of Ultras of the United States
