= Straightaway Glacier =

Glacier in Alaska, United States

- Location within Alaska
- Interactive map of Straightaway Glacier
- Type: Valley glacier
- Location: Denali Borough, Alaska
- Coordinates: 63°06′46″N 151°19′55″W
- Length: 15 miles (24 km)

Straightaway Glacier, also known as Crosson Glacier, is a glacier in Denali National Park and Preserve in the U.S. state of Alaska. The glacier begins in the Alaska Range on the north side of Mount Crosson, moving northwest. It is a source of the Foraker River.

== See also ==
- List of glaciers
