= West Fork Glacier (Alaska Range) =

- Location within Alaska
- Interactive map of West Fork Glacier
- Type: Valley glacier
- Location: Denali Borough, Alaska, U.S.
- Coordinates: 63°14′25″N 150°11′11″W

There are three glaciers named West Fork Glacier in Alaska, two of which are in the Alaska Range. The first West Fork Glacier is a glacier in Denali National Park and Preserve in the U.S. state of Alaska. The glacier originates at Anderson Pass, extending to the east and forming the source of the West Fork of the Chulitna River. Traleika Glacier was named in 1945 by Bradford Washburn, attributing the name to a Susitna name meaning "great one" or "high one." GNIS ID 1411870

The second West Fork Glacier is east of the first and is not in Denali National Park. It flows to the southwest, terminating in the headwaters of the Susitna River, 55 miles southeast of Healy, Alaska. GNIS ID 1897258

The third West Fork Glacier is in the Wrangell Mountains. GNIS ID 1411869

== See also ==
- List of glaciers
