= Tokositna Glacier =

Glacier in Alaska, United States

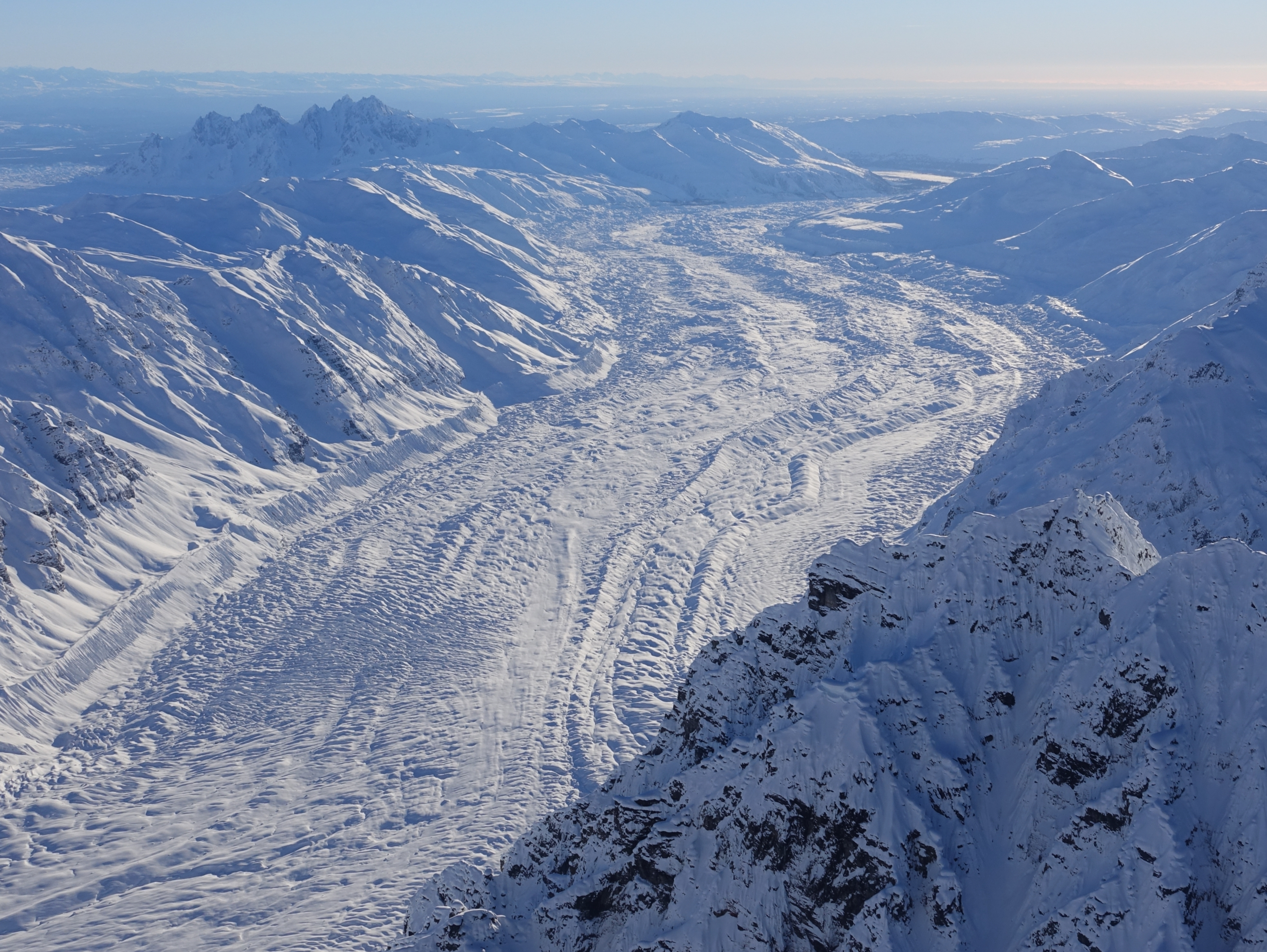
- Aerial view looking south

- Location within Alaska
- Interactive map of Tokositna Glacier
- Type: Valley glacier
- Location: Matanuska-Susitna Borough, Alaska, U.S.
- Coordinates: 62°50′07″N 150°51′36″W
- Length: 25 miles (40 km)

Tokositna Glacier is a glacier in the Alaska Range of Denali National Park and Preserve in the U.S. state of Alaska. The glacier originates in two major arms on the east side of Mount Hunter, moving east until the main arms join, then turning south. Tokositna Glacier is the source of the Tokositna River. Spelling variants and alternate names include Tokasitna Glacier, Tokichitna Glacier and Tuqashitnu Li'a.

Its thickness has been monitored by the National Park Service, which found consistent thinning since the 1990s.

== See also ==
- List of glaciers
