= Shadows Glacier =

Glacier in Alaska, United States

- Location within Alaska
- Interactive map of Shadows Glacier
- Type: Valley glacier
- Location: Matanuska-Susitna Borough, Alaska, U.S.
- Coordinates: 62°27′57″N 152°42′08″W

Shadows Glacier is a glacier in the Alaska Range of Denali National Park and Preserve in the U.S. state of Alaska. The glacier begins in the Kichatna Mountains on the north side of the Cathedral Spires, moving north. It receives neighboring Shelf Glacier as a tributary, and together with Cul-de-sac Glacier feeds the west fork of the Yentna River.

== See also ==
- List of glaciers
