= Paiute Peak =

Mountain in Colorado, United States

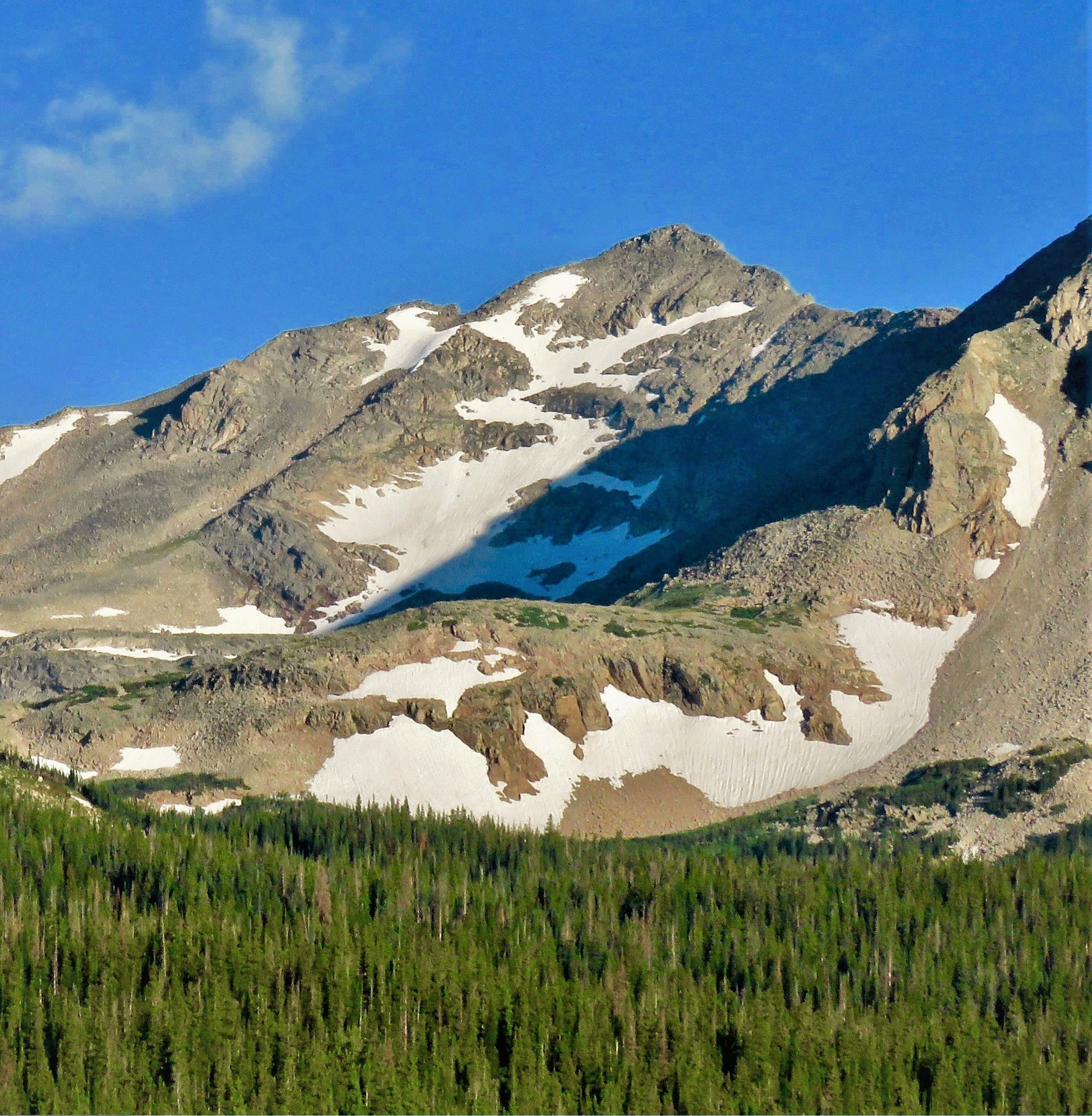
- Southeast aspect

Highest point
- Elevation: 13,088 ft (3,989 m)
- Prominence: 452 ft (138 m)
- Parent peak: Mount Audubon (13,229 ft)
- Isolation: 0.86 mi (1.38 km)
- Coordinates: 40°05′51″N 105°37′56″W

Naming
- Etymology: Paiute

Geography
- Location within Colorado Location within the United States
- Country: United States
- State: Colorado
- County: Boulder / Grand
- Protected area: Indian Peaks Wilderness
- Parent range: Rocky Mountains; Front Range
- Topo map: USGS Monarch Lake

Geology
- Rock age: Mesoproterozoic
- Rock type: Granite

Climbing
- Easiest route: Southeast face class 2

Paiute Peak is a 13,088-foot (3,989 m) mountain summit on the boundary shared by Boulder County and Grand County, in Colorado, United States.

== Description ==
Paiute Peak is set on the Continental Divide in the Front Range which is a subrange of the Rocky Mountains. The mountain is located 21 miles (34 km) west-northwest of Boulder in the Indian Peaks Wilderness, on land managed by Arapaho National Forest and Roosevelt National Forest. It is the sixth-highest summit in the wilderness and 14th-highest in Boulder County. Precipitation runoff from the mountain's east slope drains into tributaries of St. Vrain Creek, whereas the west slope drains to Monarch Lake via Cascade and Thunderbolt creeks, thence Lake Granby. Topographic relief is significant as the summit rises 1,800 feet (549 m) above Blue Lake in 0.75 mile and 2,200 feet (671 m) above Pawnee Lake in one mile (1.6 km). An ascent of the peak involves hiking nine miles (14 km) (round trip) with 2,564 feet (782 m) of elevation gain. The mountain was named by Ellsworth Bethel and the toponym was officially adopted on October 7, 1914, by the United States Board on Geographic Names.

== Climate ==
According to the Köppen climate classification system, the mountain is located in an alpine subarctic climate zone with cold, snowy winters, and cool to warm summers. Due to its altitude, it receives precipitation all year, as snow in winter and as thunderstorms in summer, with a dry period in late spring.

== Climbing ==
Established climbing routes on Paiute Peak:

- Southeast face – class 2
- East ridge – class 3

== See also ==
- Thirteener
