= Pawnee Peak =

Mountain in the state of Colorado

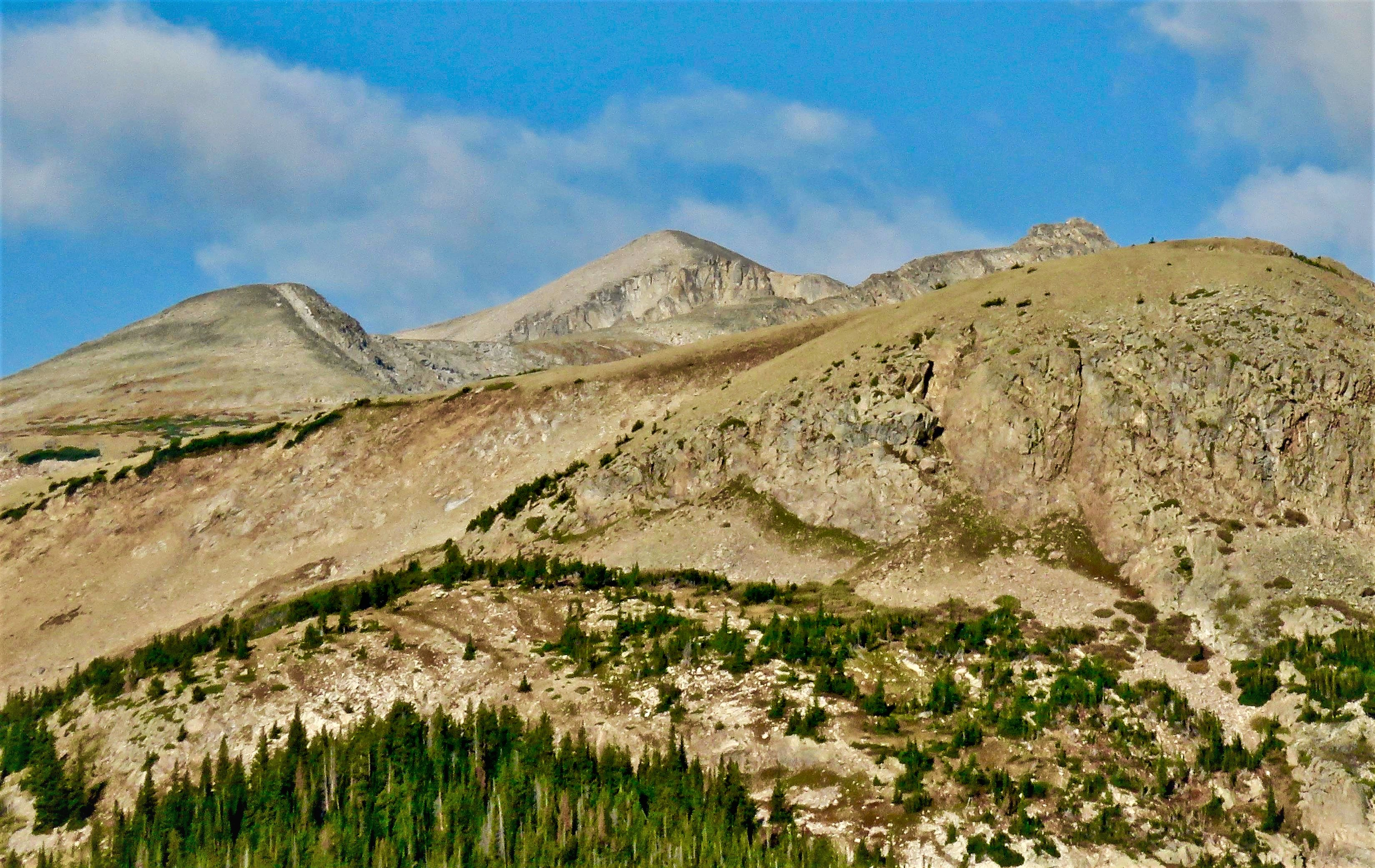
- East aspect, centered at top

Highest point
- Elevation: 12,943 ft (3,945 m)
- Prominence: 420 ft (128 m)
- Parent peak: Apache Peak (13,441 ft)
- Isolation: 0.49 mi (0.79 km)
- Coordinates: 40°04′53″N 105°37′57″W

Naming
- Etymology: Pawnee people

Geography
- Location within Colorado Location within the United States
- Country: United States
- State: Colorado
- County: Boulder / Grand
- Protected area: Indian Peaks Wilderness
- Parent range: Rocky Mountains; Front Range
- Topo map: USGS Monarch Lake

Geology
- Rock age: Mesoproterozoic
- Rock type: Granite

Climbing
- Easiest route: South slope class 2

Pawnee Peak is a 12,943-foot (3,945 m) mountain summit on the boundary shared by Boulder County and Grand County, in Colorado, United States.

== Description ==
Pawnee Peak is set on the Continental Divide in the Front Range which is a subrange of the Rocky Mountains. The mountain is located 20 miles (32 km) west-northwest of Boulder in the Indian Peaks Wilderness, on land managed by Arapaho National Forest and Roosevelt National Forest. It is the ninth-highest summit in the wilderness and 18th-highest in Boulder County. Precipitation runoff from the mountain's east slope drains to South St. Vrain Creek, whereas the west slope drains to Monarch Lake via Cascade Creek. Topographic relief is significant as the summit rises 2,060 feet (628 m) above Pawnee Lake in 0.7 mile (1.1 km) and 1,600 feet (488 m) above Blue Lake in 0.75 mile (1.2 km). An ascent of the peak involves hiking ten point five miles (16.9 km) (round trip) with 2,500 feet (762 m) of elevation gain. The mountain was named by Ellsworth Bethel and the toponym was officially adopted on October 7, 1914, by the United States Board on Geographic Names.

== Climate ==
According to the Köppen climate classification system, the mountain is located in an alpine subarctic climate zone with cold, snowy winters, and cool to warm summers. Due to its altitude, it receives precipitation all year, as snow in winter and as thunderstorms in summer, with a dry period in late spring.

== Climbing ==
Established climbing routes on Pawnee Peak:

- South slopes – class 2
- East ridge – class 3

== Gallery ==
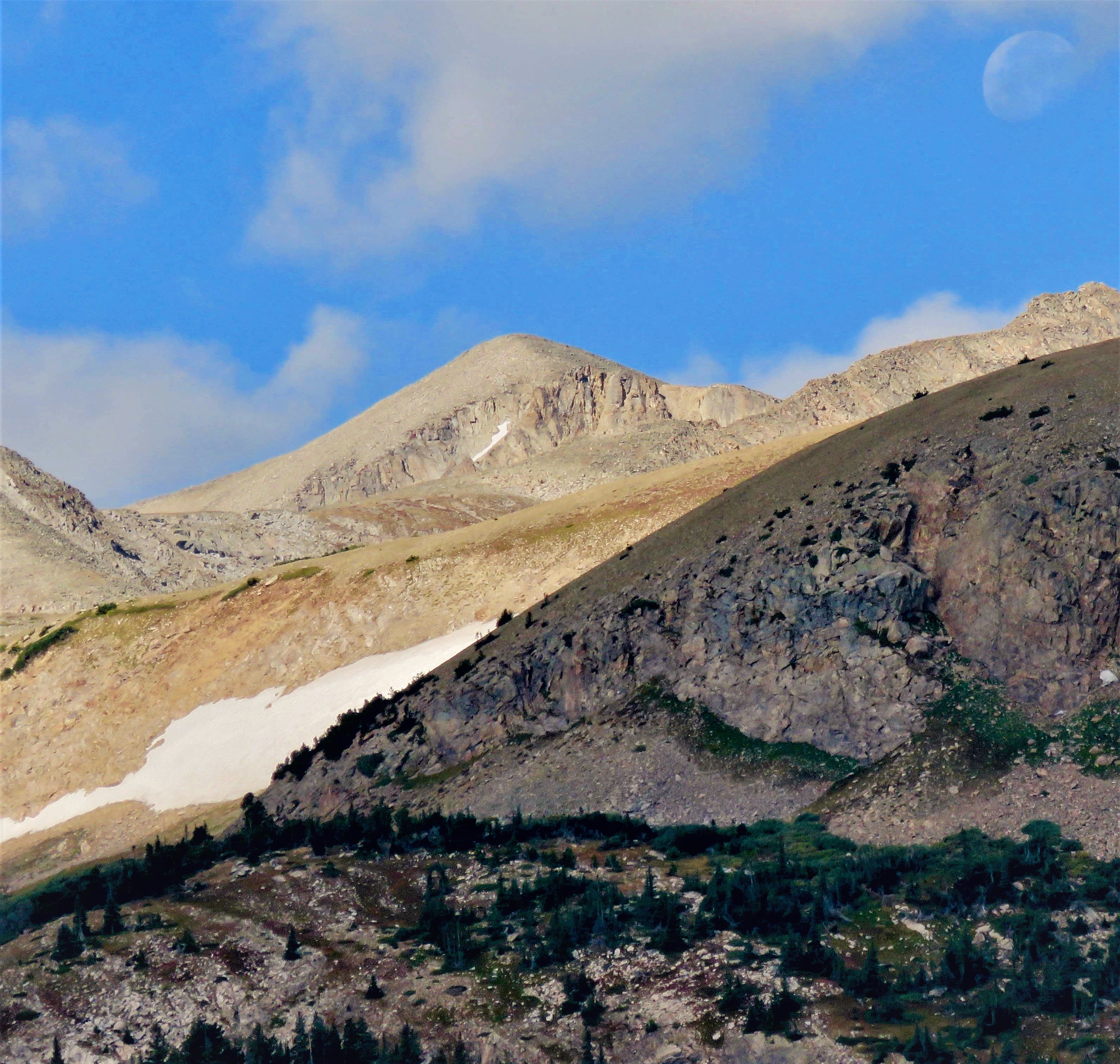
East aspect

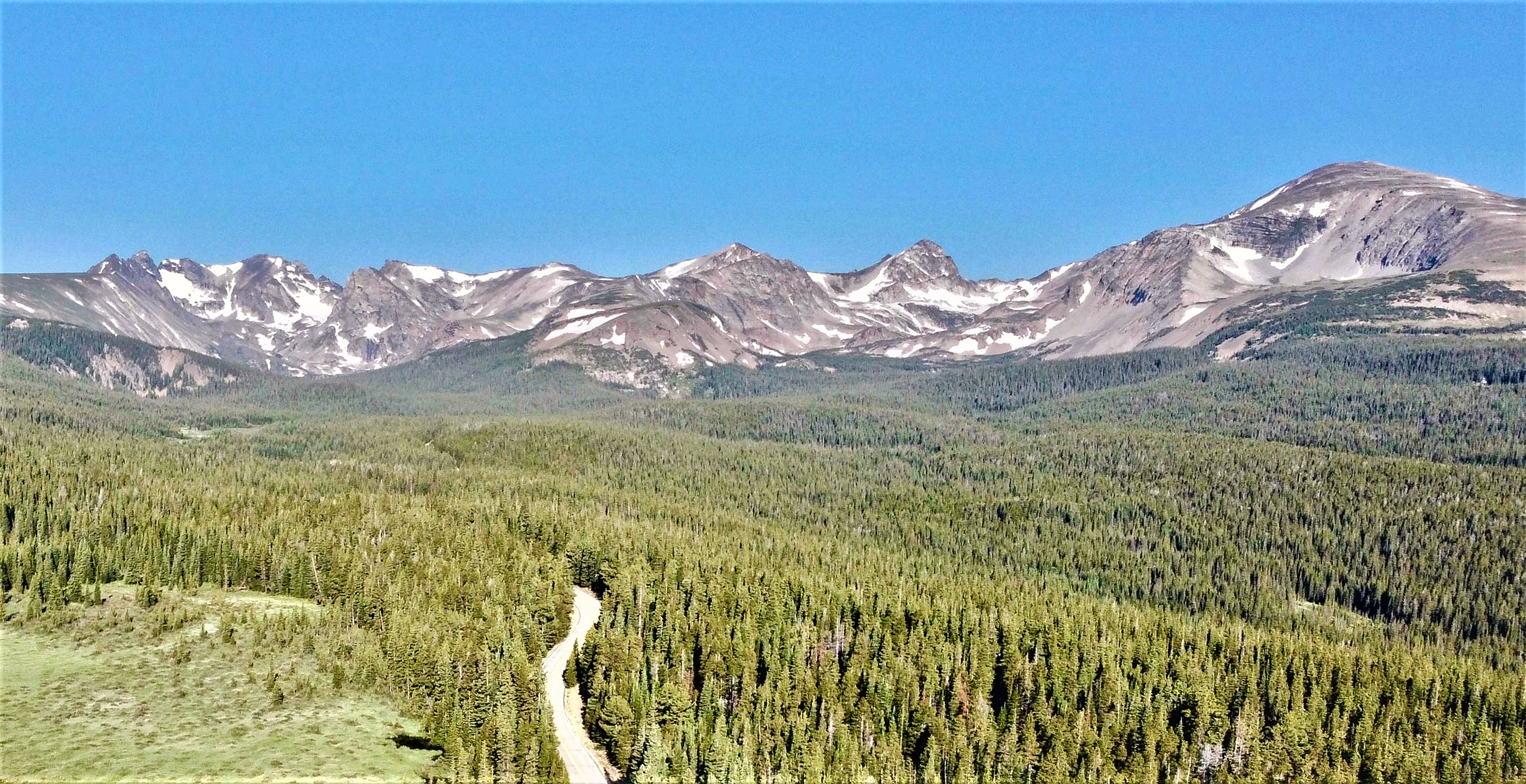
Looking west to the Continental Divide. Left to rightː Navajo Peak, Apache Peak, Shoshoni Peak, Pawnee Peak (centered), Mount Toll, Mount Audubon.

== See also ==
- Mountains of Boulder County, Colorado
- Pawnee Pass
