= Navajo Peak =

Mountain in the state of Colorado

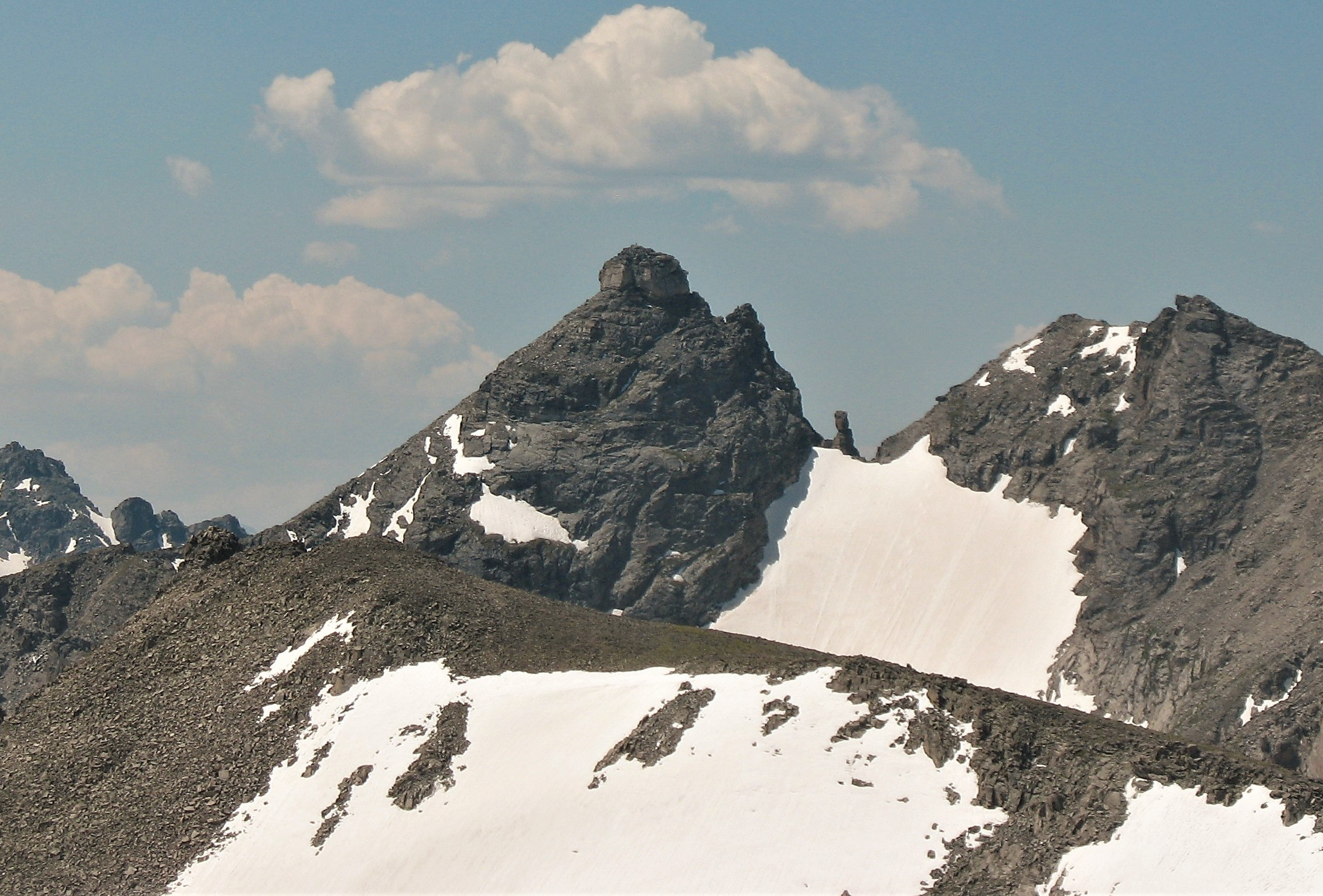
- North aspect

Highest point
- Elevation: 13,409 ft (4,087 m)
- Prominence: 316 ft (96 m)
- Parent peak: Apache Peak (13,441 ft)
- Isolation: 0.43 mi (0.69 km)
- Coordinates: 40°03′12″N 105°38′47″W

Naming
- Etymology: Navajo

Geography
- Location within Colorado Location within the United States
- Country: United States
- State: Colorado
- County: Boulder / Grand
- Protected area: Indian Peaks Wilderness
- Parent range: Rocky Mountains; Front Range
- Topo map: USGS Monarch Lake

Climbing
- Easiest route: Scrambling class 3

Navajo Peak is a 13,409-foot (4,087 m) mountain summit on the boundary shared by Boulder County and Grand County, in Colorado, United States.

== Description ==
Navajo Peak is set on the Continental Divide in the Front Range which is a subrange of the Rocky Mountains. The mountain is located 21 miles (34 km) west of Boulder in the Indian Peaks Wilderness, on land managed by Arapaho National Forest and Roosevelt National Forest. It is the third-highest summit in the wilderness and fourth-highest in Grand County. Precipitation runoff from the mountain's northeast slope drains into headwaters of South St. Vrain Creek, the southeast slope drains into headwaters of North Boulder Creek, and the west slope drains to Monarch Lake via Arapaho Creek. Topographic relief is significant as the summit rises 2,800 feet (853 m) above Wheeler Basin in one mile (1.6 km). An ascent of the peak involves hiking 8.9 miles (14.3 km) (round trip) with 2,825 feet (861 m) of elevation gain, with a 35-foot scramble on the summit block.

== History ==
The mountain was named by Ellsworth Bethel and the toponym was officially adopted in 1914 by the United States Board on Geographic Names.

A party of five including Arnold Emch and his two sons climbed to the summit in August 1915.

On January 21, 1948, an airplane en route from Denver to Grand Junction crashed at 12,900-foot-elevation on the peak, and the wreckage still remains scattered on the slopes. The crash of the DC-3 was caused by a downdraft in an area of severe turbulence and resulted in the deaths of all three crewmembers. The plane belonged to the Civil Aeronautics Administration and the three men were all employees: Fred Snavely (pilot), Warren Lungstrum (co-pilot), and Ross Brown. The accident site was not found until four months later.

== Climate ==
According to the Köppen climate classification system, the mountain is located in an alpine subarctic climate zone with cold, snowy winters, and cool to warm summers. Due to its altitude, it receives precipitation all year, as snow in winter and as thunderstorms in summer, with a dry period in late spring. This climate supports the Arikaree Glacier on the southeast slope of the peak.

== Climbing ==
Established climbing routes on Navajo Peak:

- Airplane Gully – class 3
- West Chimney – class 4
- North Face – class 5.0–5.2

== Gallery ==
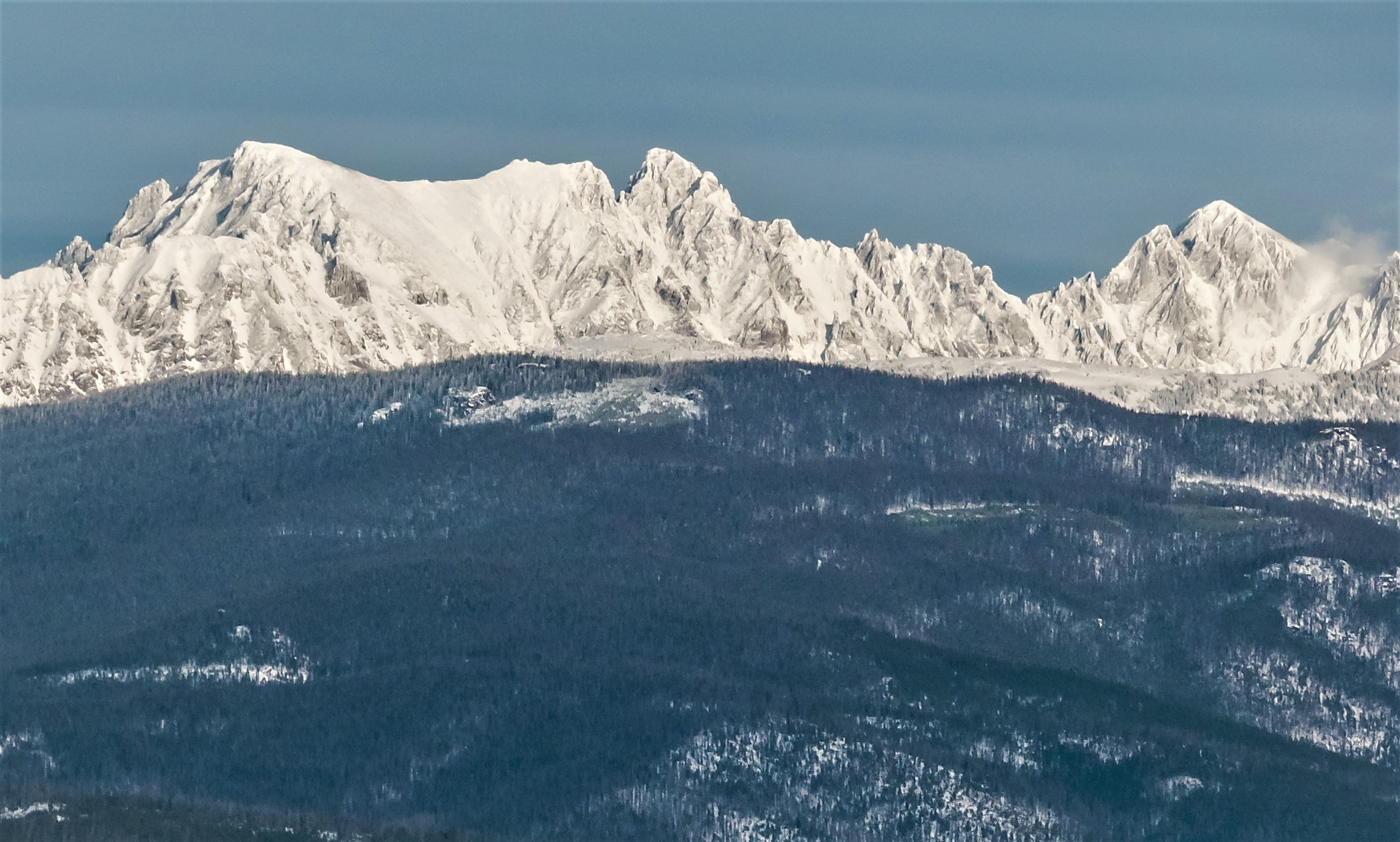
West aspect of Navajo Peak centered.
Apache Peak (left), Arikaree Peak (right).

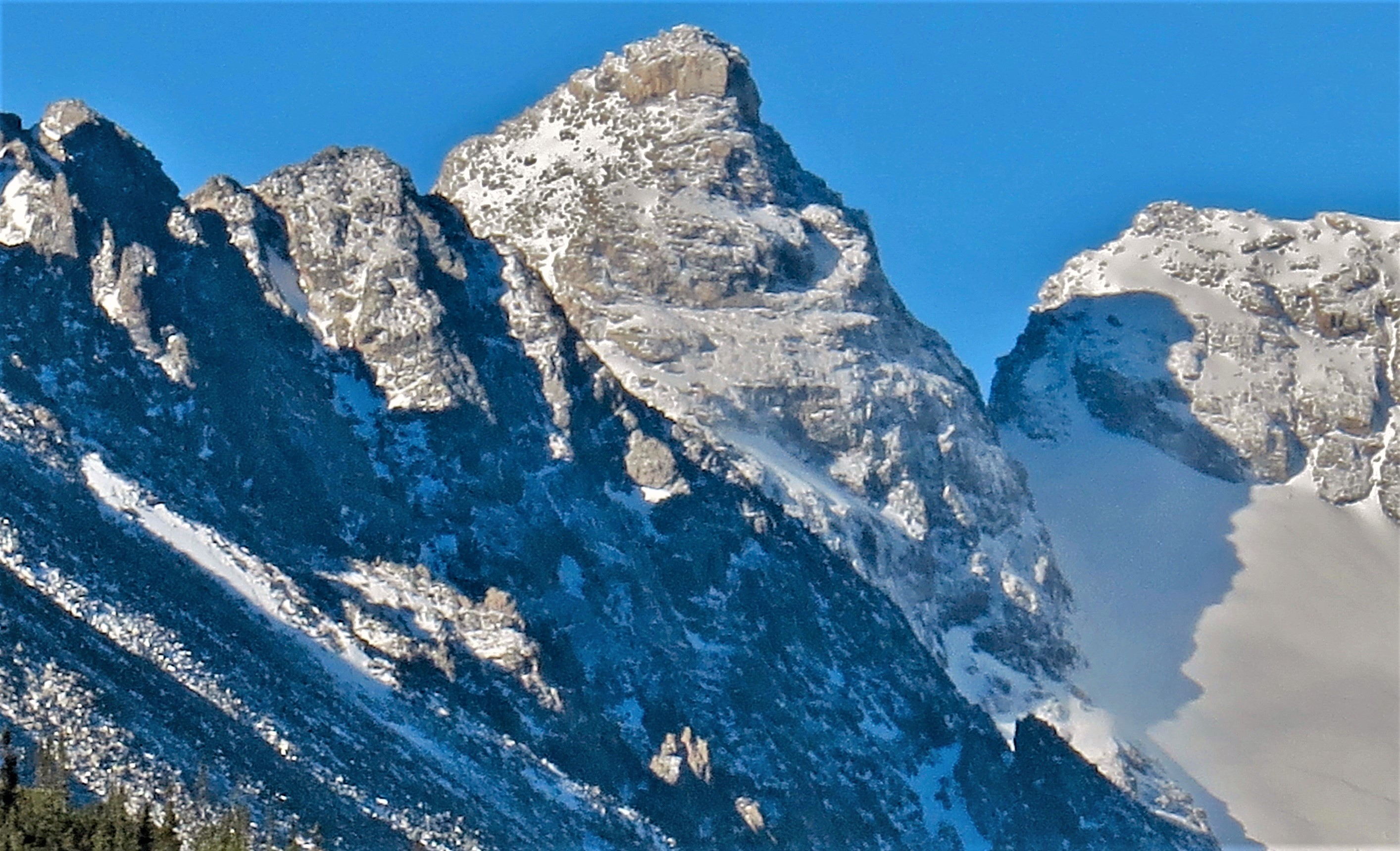
East aspect

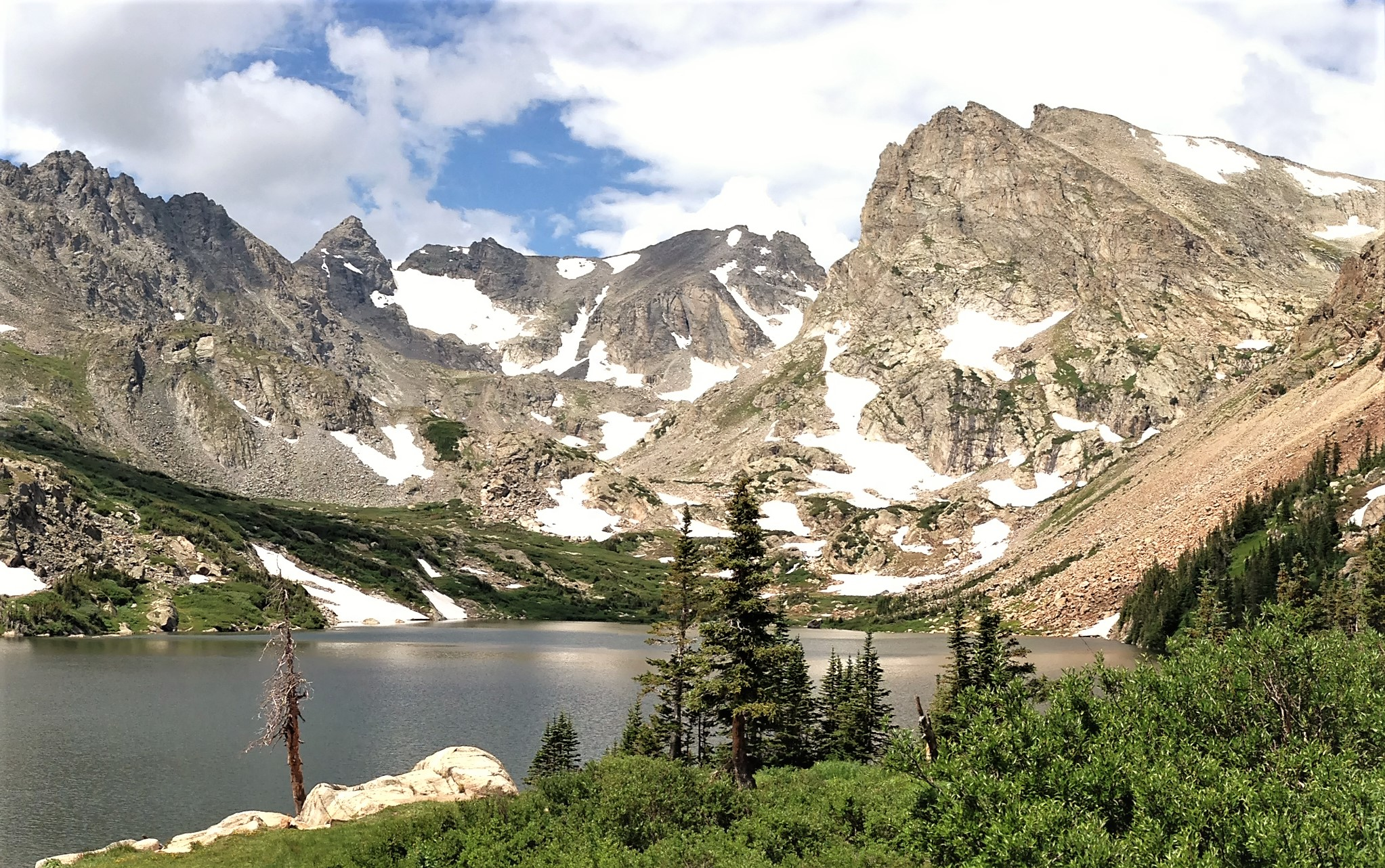
East aspect of Navajo Peak (left, pyramid shape), Apache Peak (center), and Shoshoni Peak (right). Lake Isabelle to left.

== See also ==
- Thirteener
