= Shoshoni Peak =

Mountain in the state of Colorado

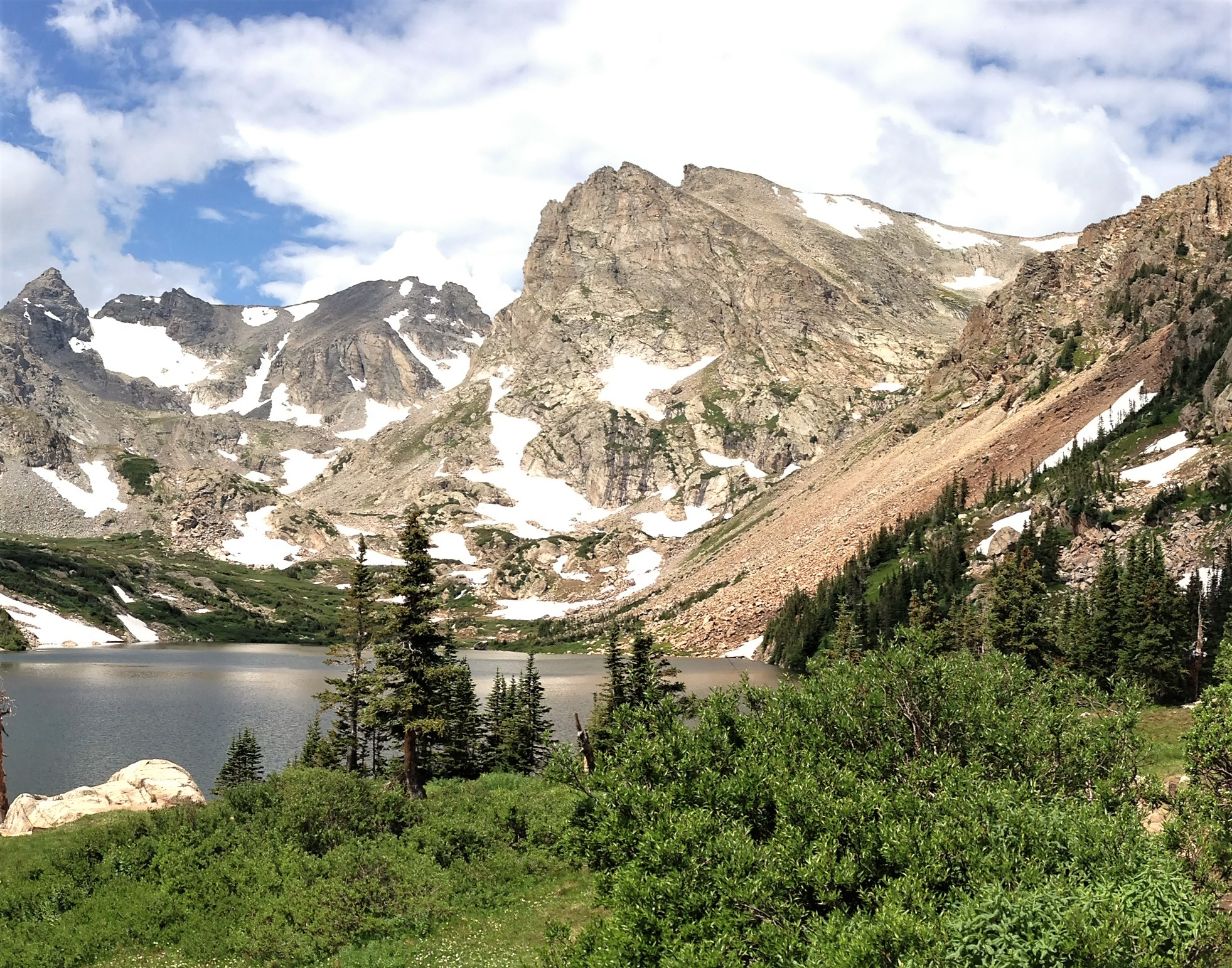
- East aspect, right of center, from Isabelle Lake (Navajo Peak and Apache Peak to left)

Highest point
- Elevation: 12,967 ft (3,952 m)
- Prominence: 328 ft (100 m)
- Parent peak: Apache Peak (13,441 ft)
- Isolation: 0.86 mi (1.38 km)
- Coordinates: 40°04′01″N 105°38′20″W

Naming
- Etymology: Shoshoni

Geography
- Location within Colorado Location within the United States
- Country: United States
- State: Colorado
- County: Boulder / Grand
- Protected area: Indian Peaks Wilderness
- Parent range: Rocky Mountains; Front Range
- Topo map: USGS Monarch Lake

Geology
- Rock age: Mesoproterozoic
- Rock type: Granite

Climbing
- Easiest route: Hiking class 2 via Pawnee Pass

Shoshoni Peak is a 12,967-foot (3,952 m) mountain summit on the boundary shared by Boulder County and Grand County, in Colorado, United States.

== Description ==
Shoshoni Peak is set on the Continental Divide in the Front Range which is a subrange of the Rocky Mountains. The mountain is located 20 miles (32 km) west of Boulder in the Indian Peaks Wilderness, on land managed by Arapaho National Forest and Roosevelt National Forest. It is the eighth-highest summit in the wilderness and 17th-highest in Boulder County. Precipitation runoff from the mountain's slopes drains chiefly into the headwaters of South St. Vrain Creek, except for the northwest slope which drains to Monarch Lake via Cascade Creek. Topographic relief is significant as the summit rises 1,600 feet (488 m) above South St. Vrain Creek in less than one-half mile. An ascent of the peak involves hiking 12.5 miles (20.1 km) (round trip) with 3,400 feet (1,036 m) of elevation gain. The mountain's toponym was officially adopted in 1966 by the United States Board on Geographic Names.

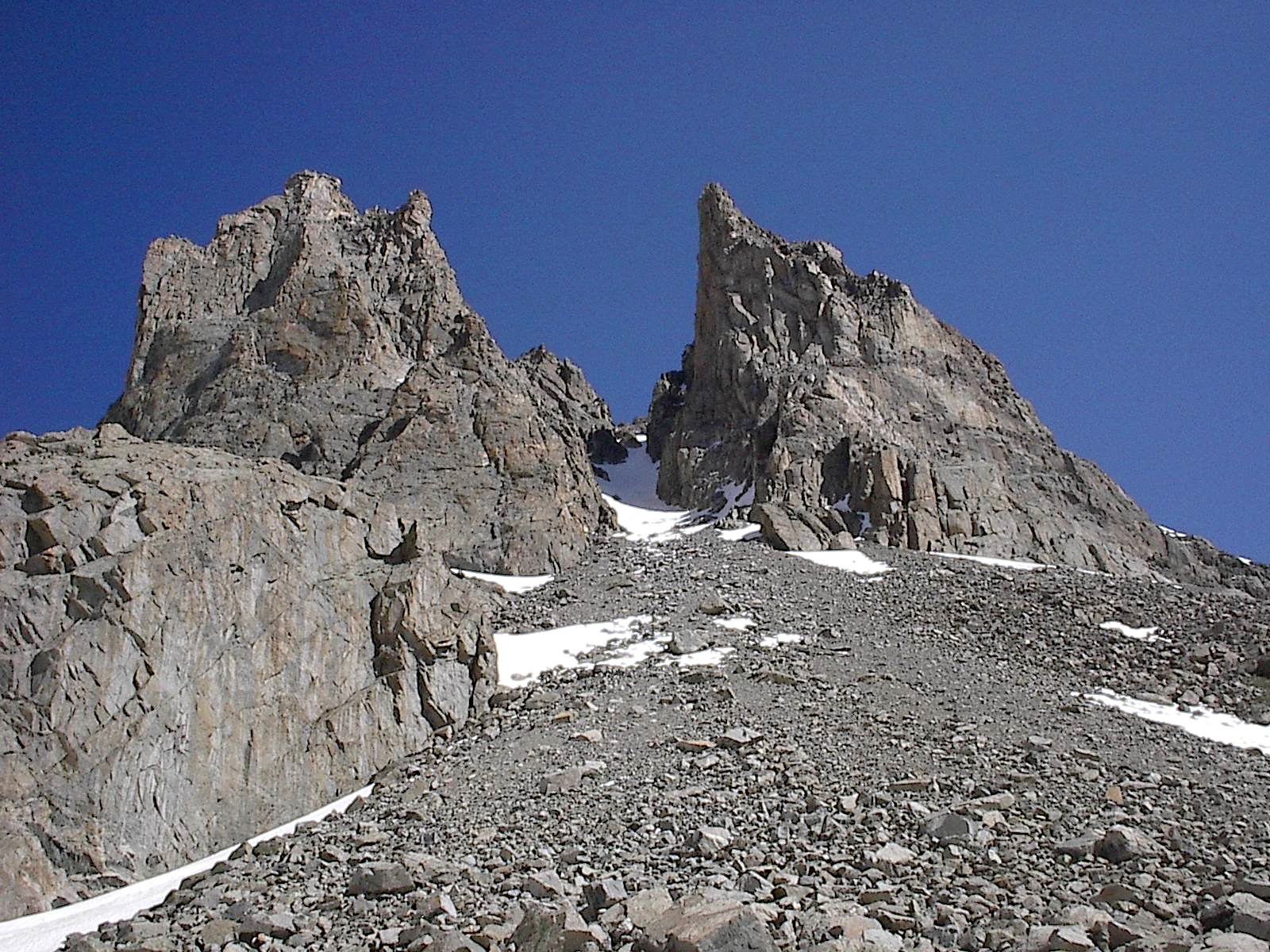
The two south buttresses of Shoshoni Peak

== Climate ==
According to the Köppen climate classification system, the mountain is located in an alpine subarctic climate zone with cold, snowy winters, and cool to warm summers. Due to its altitude, it receives precipitation all year, as snow in winter and as thunderstorms in summer, with a dry period in late spring. This climate supports the Isabelle Glacier on the southwest slope.

== Climbing ==
Established climbing routes on Shoshoni Peak:

- North Couloir – class class 2
- North slope – class 2
- Southwest Couloirs – class 3–5.2
