= Apache Peak =

Mountain in the state of Colorado

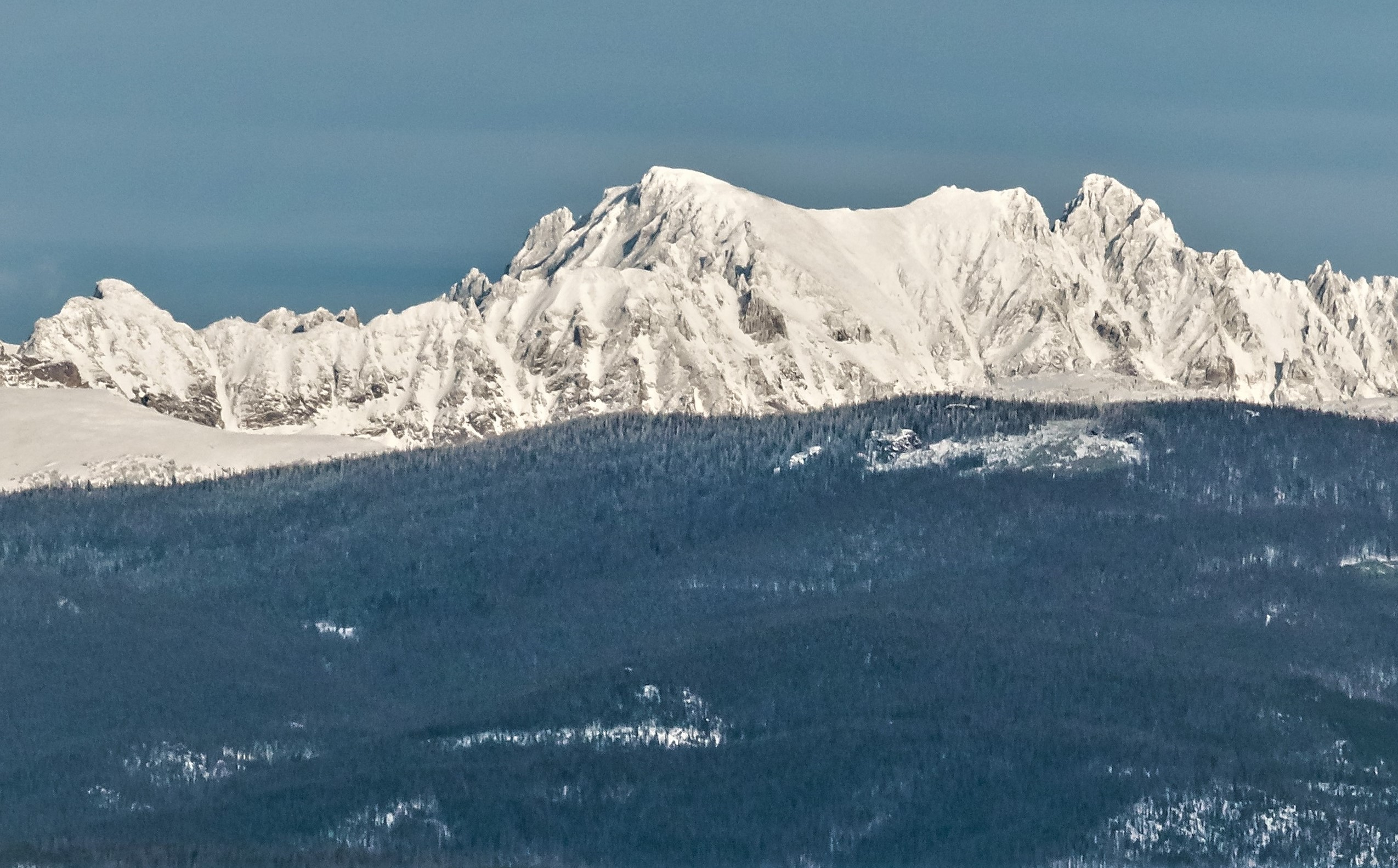
- West aspect, centered (Navajo Peak to right)

Highest point
- Elevation: 13,441 ft (4,097 m)
- Prominence: 1,083 ft (330 m)
- Parent peak: North Arapaho Peak (13,508 ft)
- Isolation: 2.22 mi (3.57 km)
- Coordinates: 40°03′30″N 105°39′04″W

Naming
- Etymology: Apache

Geography
- Location within Colorado Location within the United States
- Country: United States
- State: Colorado
- County: Boulder / Grand
- Protected area: Indian Peaks Wilderness
- Parent range: Rocky Mountains; Front Range
- Topo map: USGS Monarch Lake

Geology
- Rock age: Precambrian
- Rock type: Granite

Climbing
- Easiest route: Hiking class 2

Apache Peak is a 13,441-foot (4,097 m) mountain summit on the boundary shared by Boulder County and Grand County, in Colorado, United States.

== Description ==
Apache Peak is set on the Continental Divide in the Front Range which is a subrange of the Rocky Mountains. The mountain is located 21 miles (34 km) west of Boulder in the Indian Peaks Wilderness, on land managed by Arapaho National Forest and Roosevelt National Forest. It is the second-highest summit in the wilderness and third-highest in Grand County. Precipitation runoff from the mountain's east slope drains into headwaters of South St. Vrain Creek, whereas the west slope drains to Monarch Lake thence Lake Granby via Cascade and Arapaho creeks. Topographic relief is significant as the summit rises 2,840 feet (866 m) above Wheeler Basin in one mile (1.6 km) and 2,460 feet (750 m) above Triangle Lake in one-half mile. An ascent of the peak involves hiking 12.5 miles (20.1 km) (round trip) with 3,400 feet (1,036 m) of elevation gain. The mountain was named by Ellsworth Bethel, and the toponym was officially adopted in 1914 by the United States Board on Geographic Names.

== Climate ==
According to the Köppen climate classification system, the mountain is located in an alpine subarctic climate zone with cold, snowy winters, and cool to warm summers. Due to its altitude, it receives precipitation all year, as snow in winter and as thunderstorms in summer, with a dry period in late spring. This climate supports the Fair Glacier in the peak's northwest cirque and the Isabelle Glacier on the northeast slope.

== Climbing ==
Established climbing routes on Apache Peak:

- East slope – class 3
- Apache Couloir – class 3
- East Ledges – class 3
- Fair Glacier – class 3
- South Ridge – class 3
- Queens Way – class 2

== Gallery ==
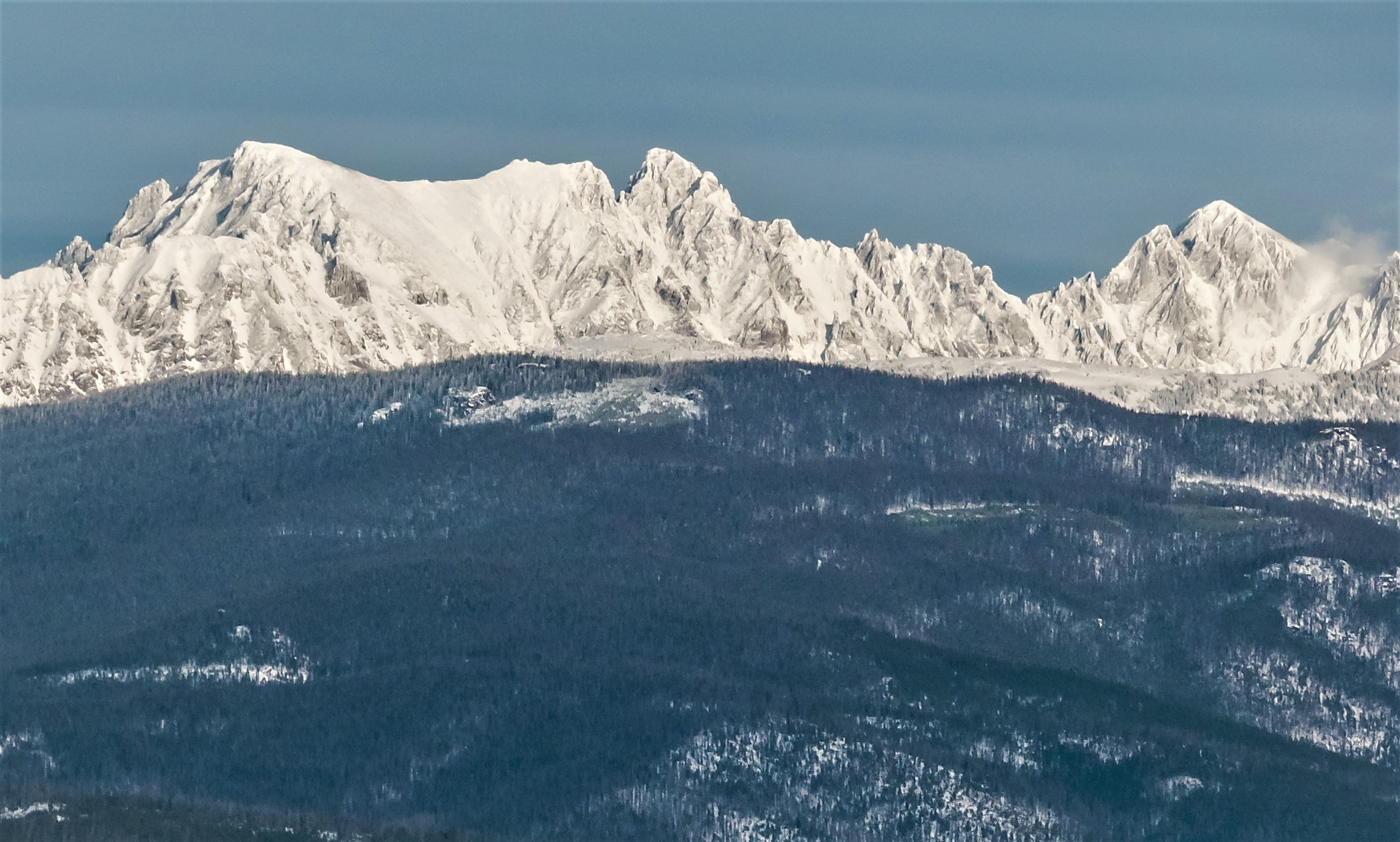
West aspect of Apache Peak (left)
Navajo Peak centered, Arikaree Peak (right).

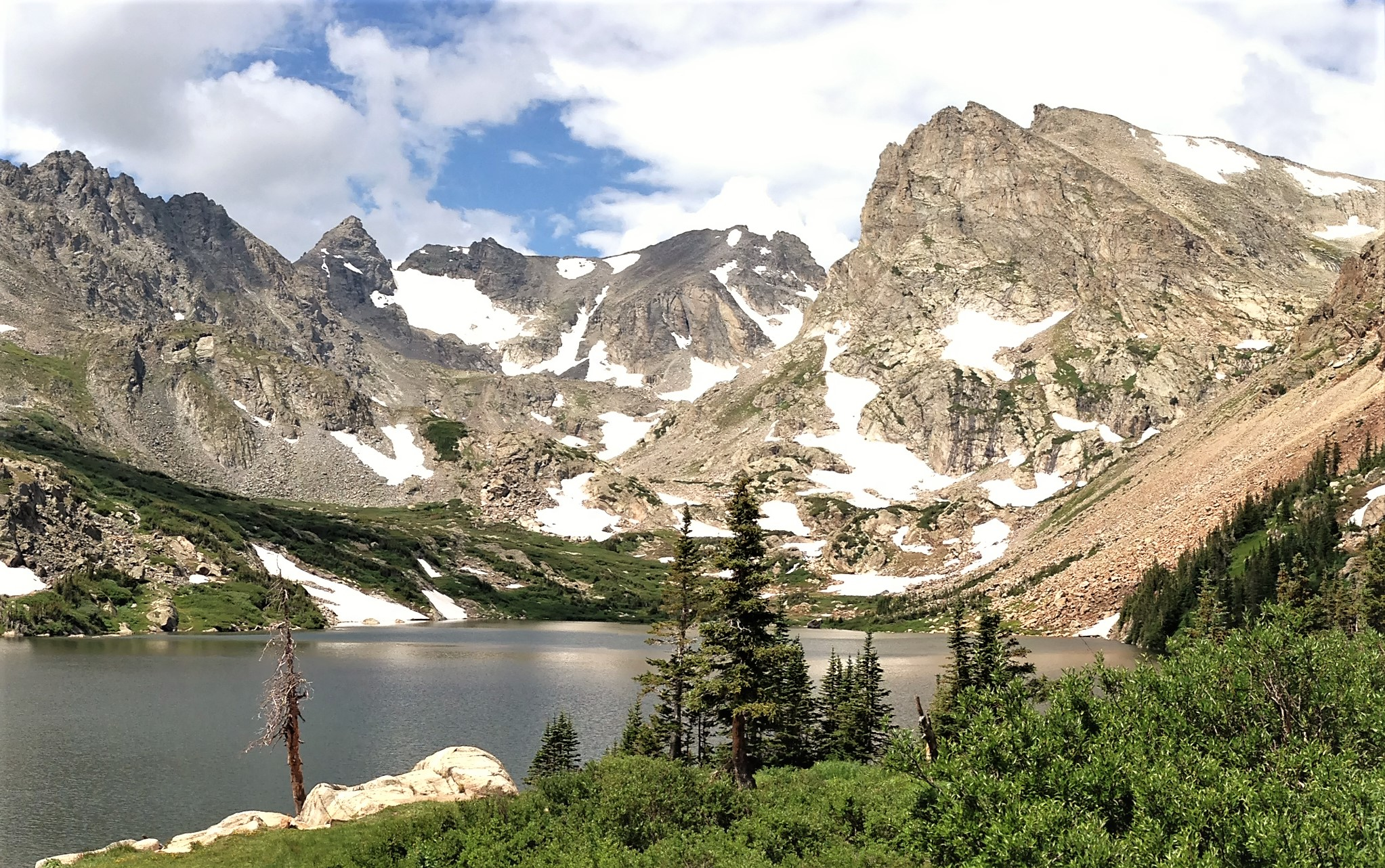
East aspect of Navajo Peak (left, pyramid shape), Apache Peak (center), and Shoshoni Peak (right). Lake Isabelle to left.

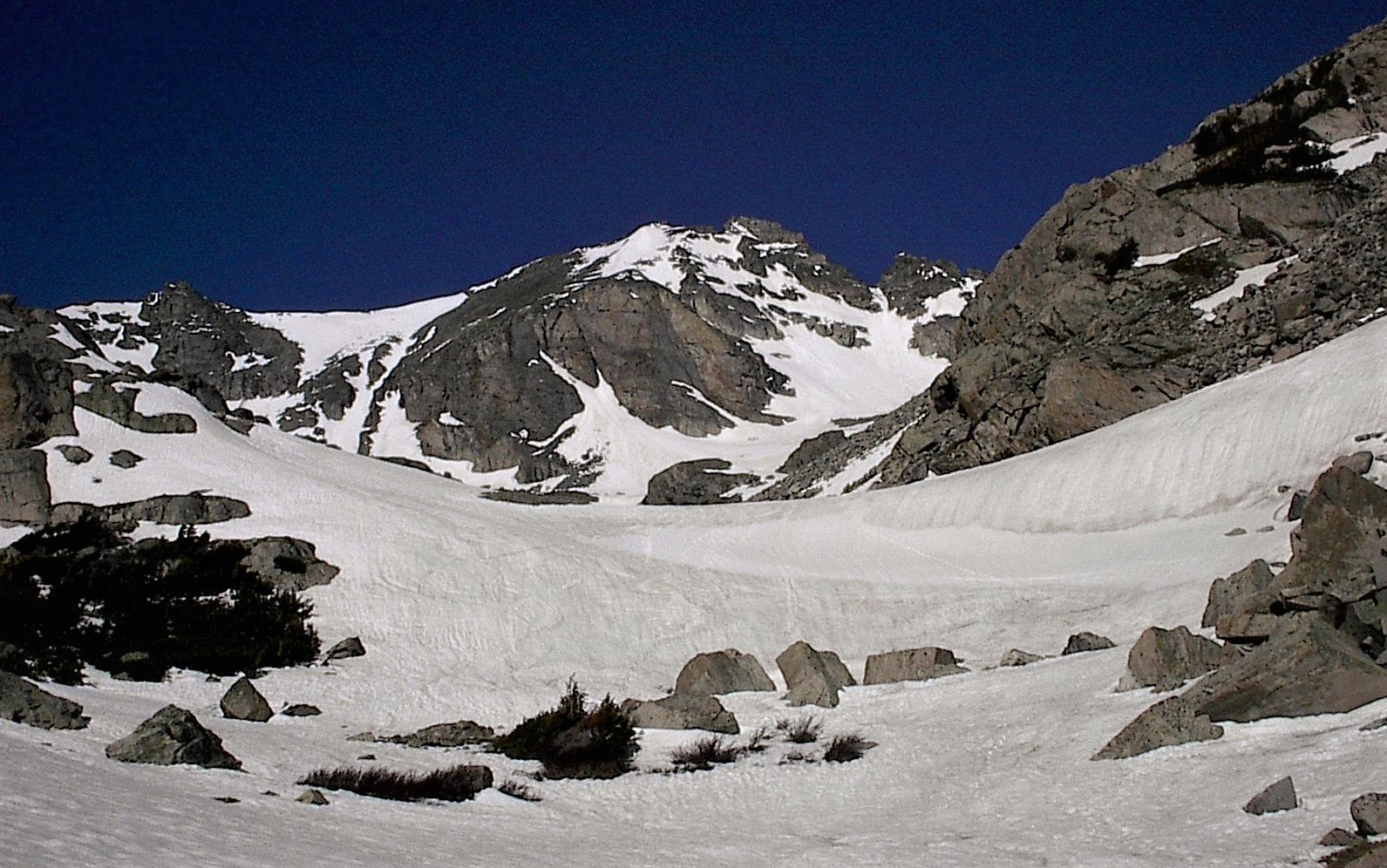
East aspect

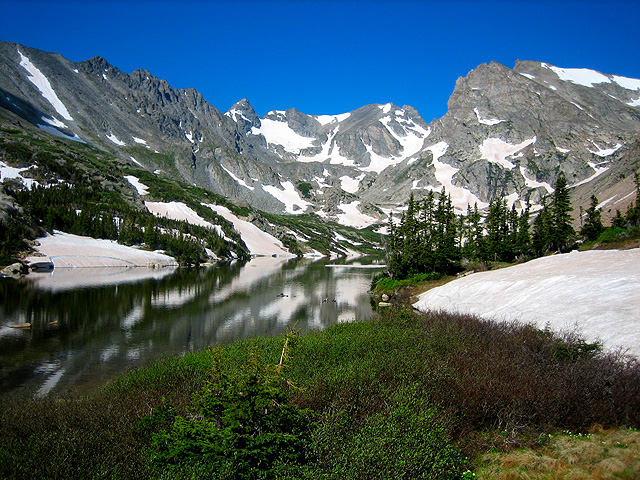
Apache Peak (center) from Lake Isabelle

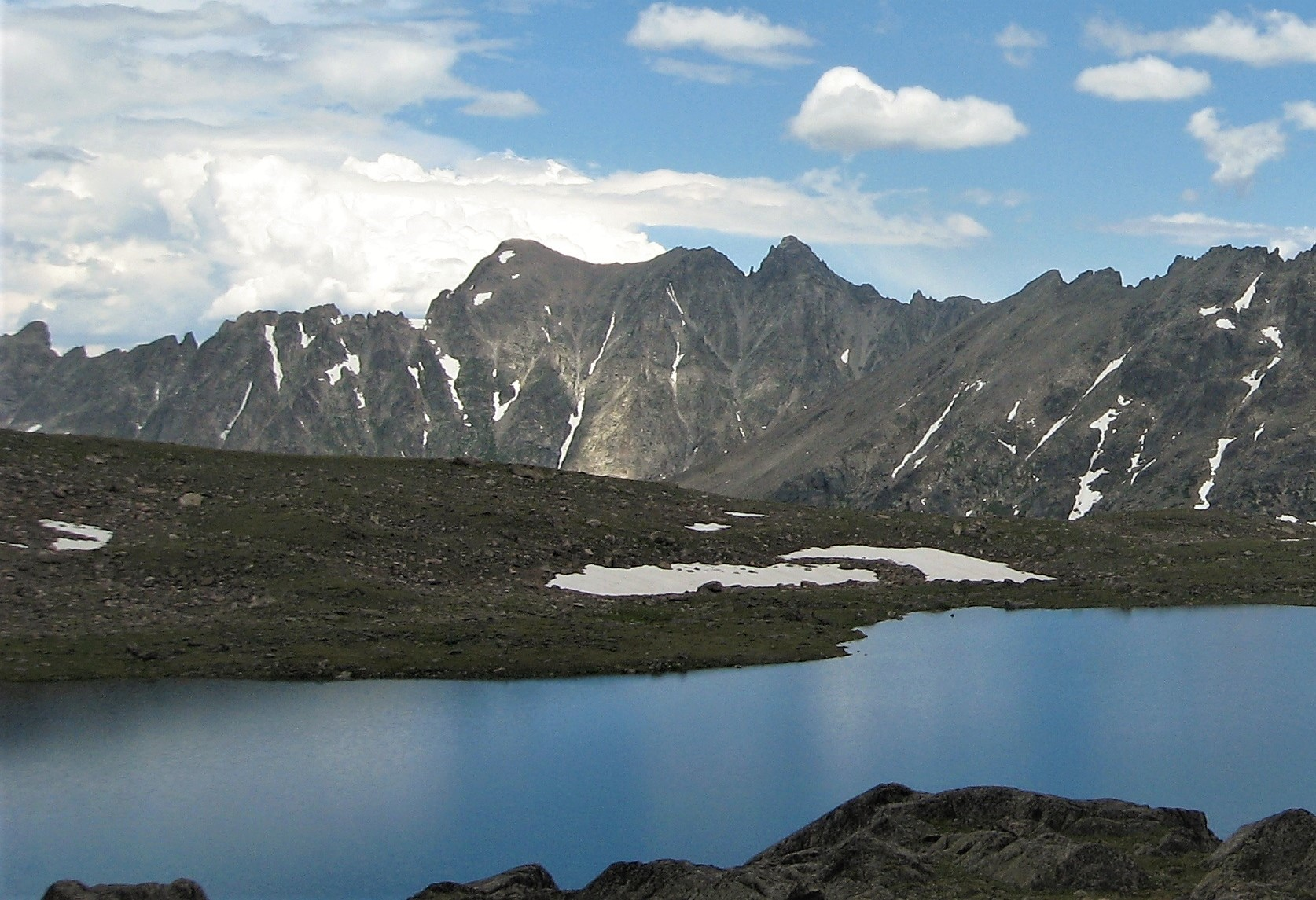
Apache Peak / Navajo Peak viewed from the southwest at Lake Dorothy.

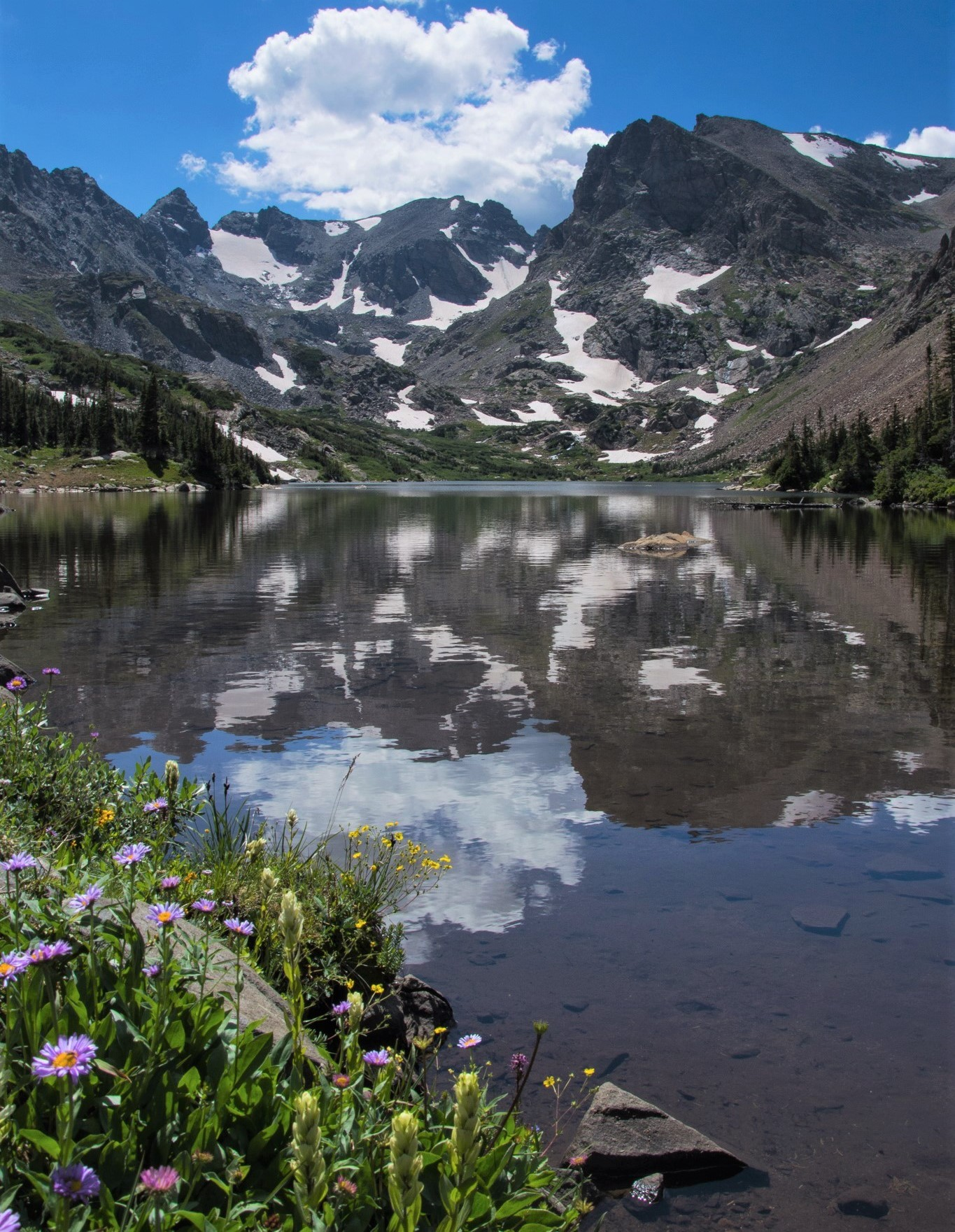
Navajo Peak, Apache Peak, and Shoshoni Peak reflected in Lake Isabelle

== See also ==
- Thirteener
