= Mount Audubon =

Mountain in the U.S. state of Colorado

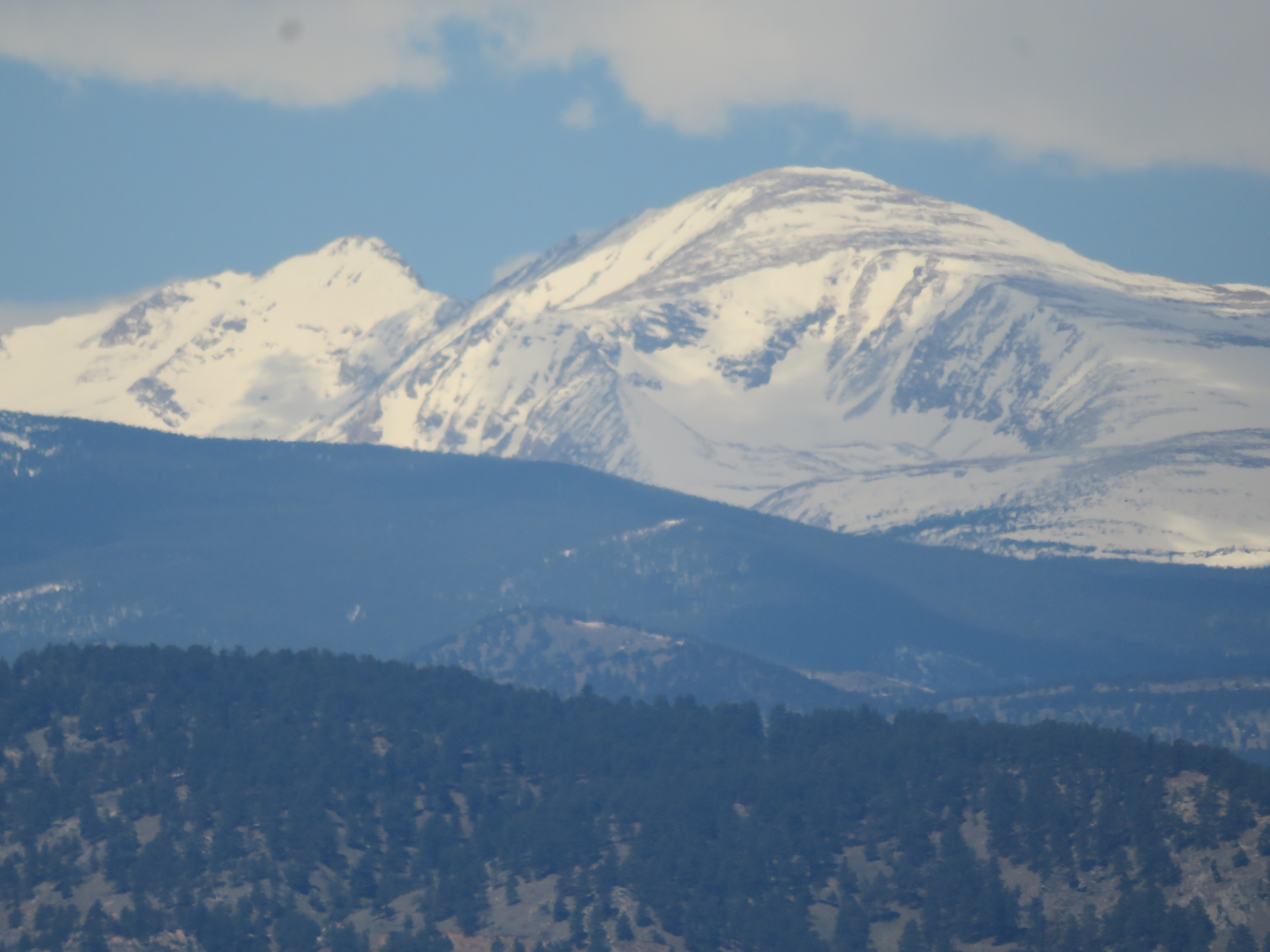
- Mt. Audubon, Front Range, Colorado

Highest point
- Elevation: 13,229 ft (4,032 m)
- Prominence: 843 ft (257 m)
- Isolation: 3.36 mi (5.41 km)
- Coordinates: 40°05′56″N 105°36′59″W

Naming
- Etymology: John James Audubon

Geography
- Location within Colorado
- Location: Boulder County, Colorado, U.S.
- Parent range: Front Range, Indian Peaks
- Topo map(s): USGS 7.5' topographic map Ward, Colorado

Climbing
- Easiest route: hike

Mount Audubon is a high mountain summit of the Indian Peaks in the northern Front Range of the Rocky Mountains of North America. The 13,229-foot (4,032 m) thirteener is located in the Indian Peaks Wilderness of Roosevelt National Forest, 5.6 miles (9.0 km) west-northwest (bearing 287°) of the Town of Ward in Boulder County, Colorado, United States. The mountain was named in honor of John James Audubon.

== Gallery ==
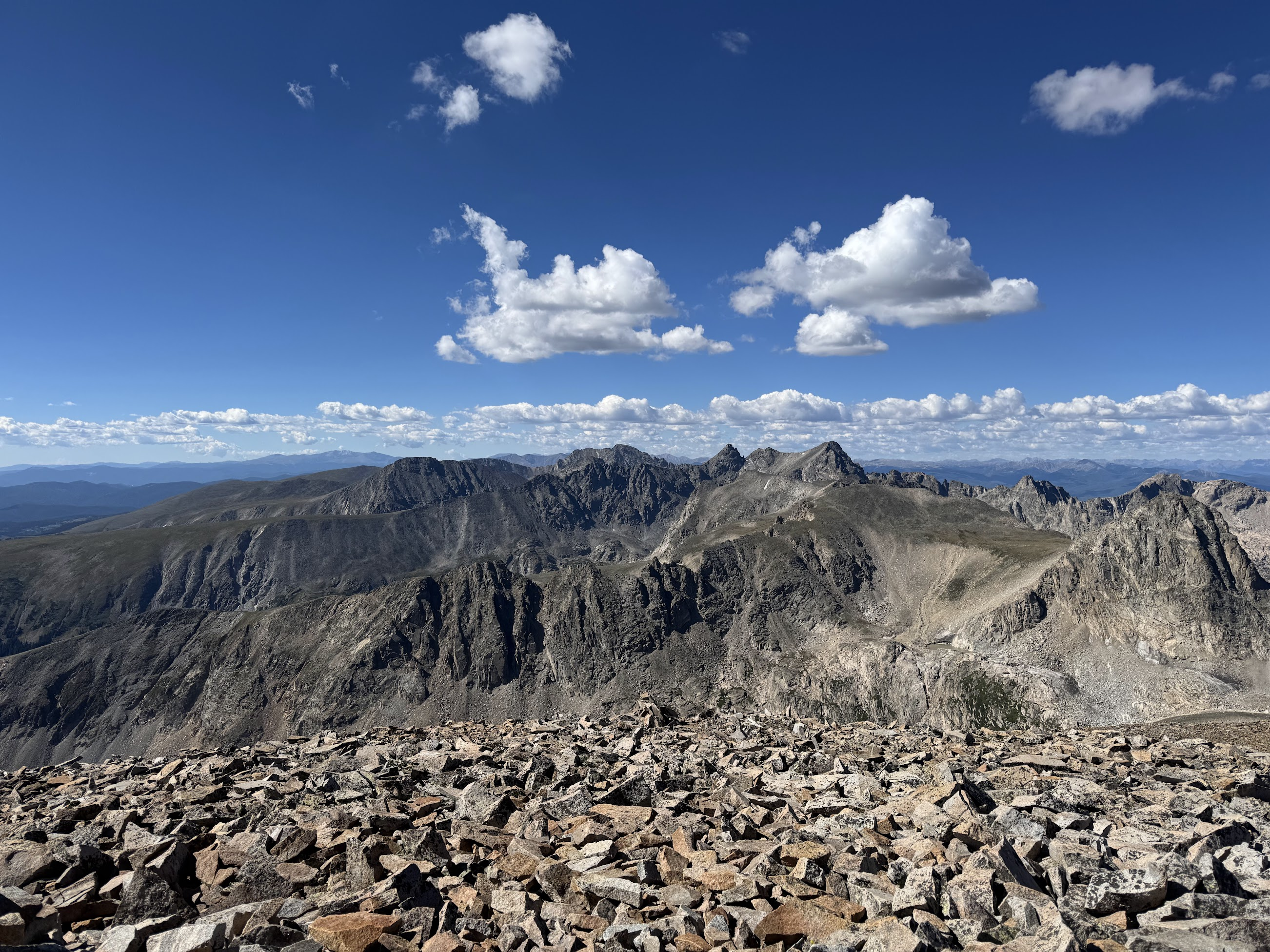
Looking South from Mount Audubon Summit

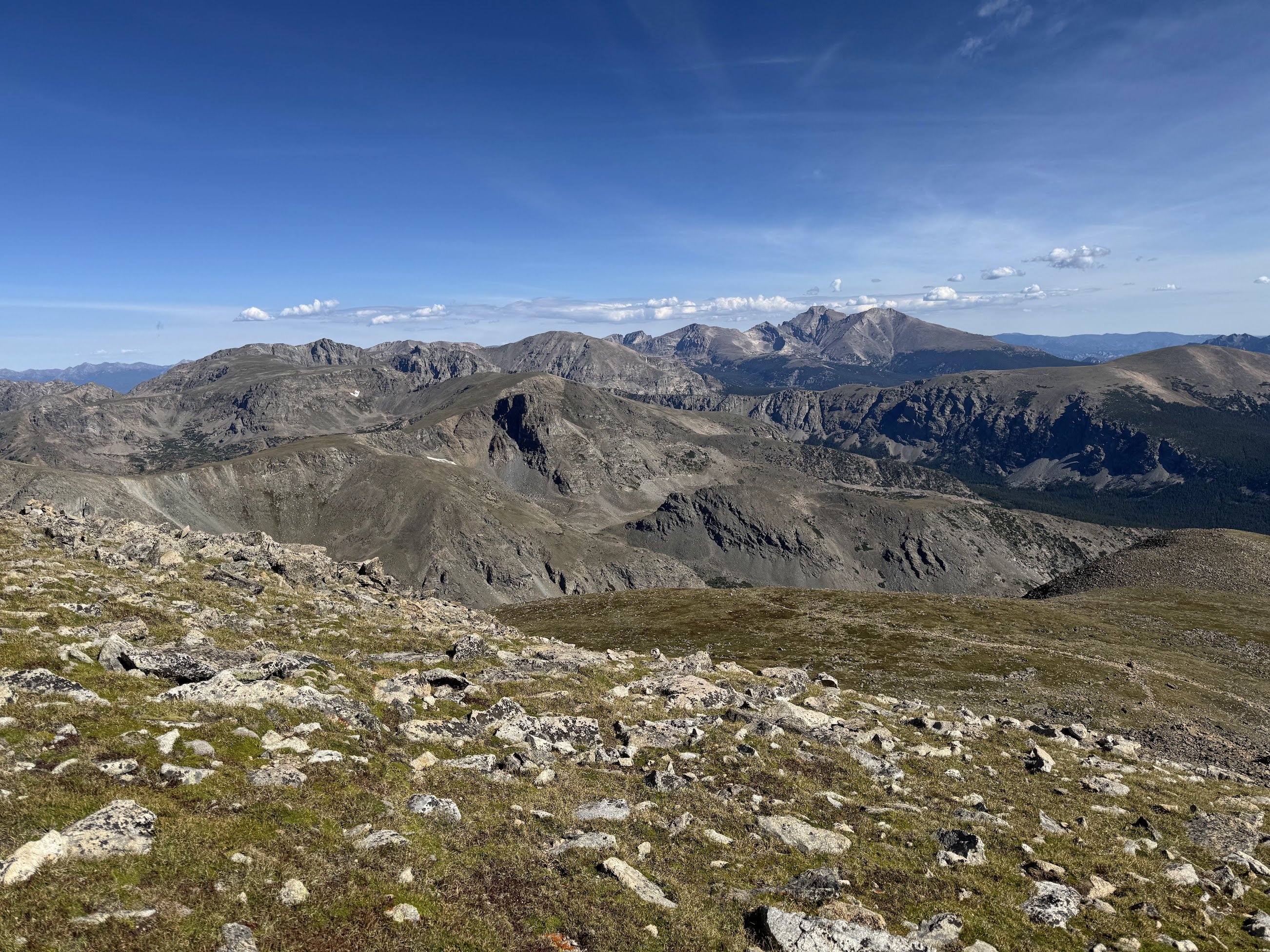
Looking North from Mount Audubon Summit Slope

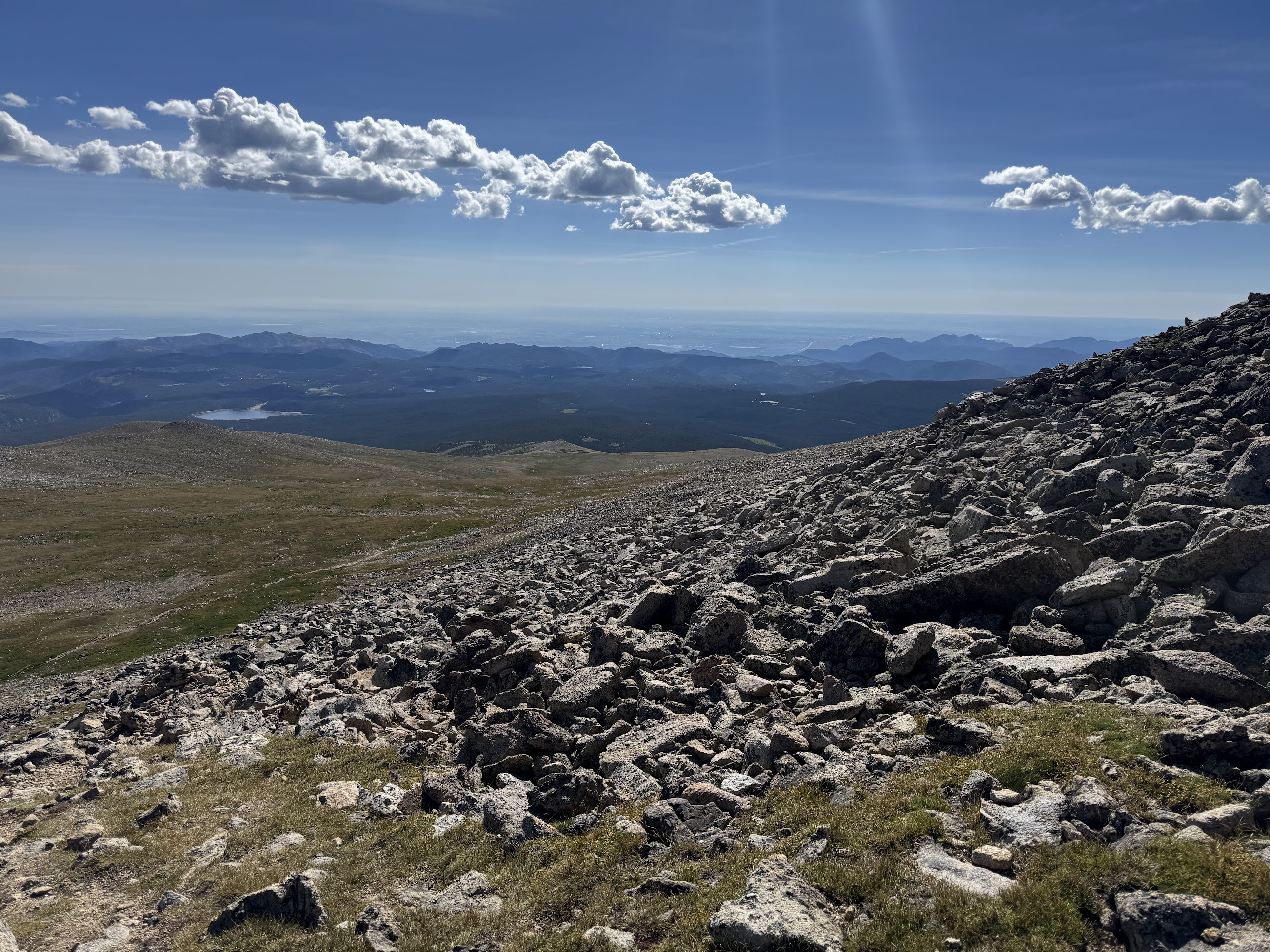
Looking East from Mount Audubon Summit Slope

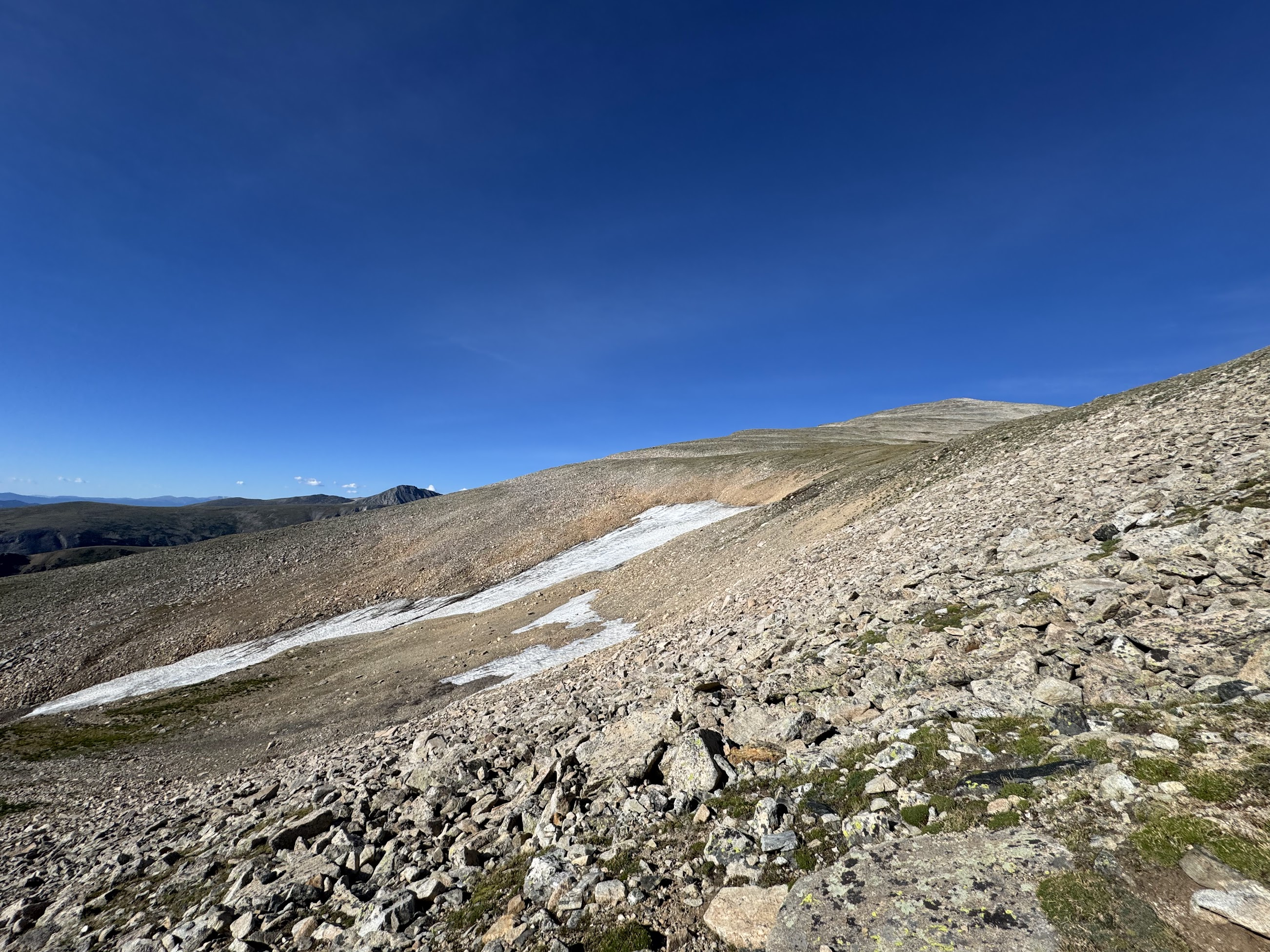
Snowfield on East Slope of Mount Audubon

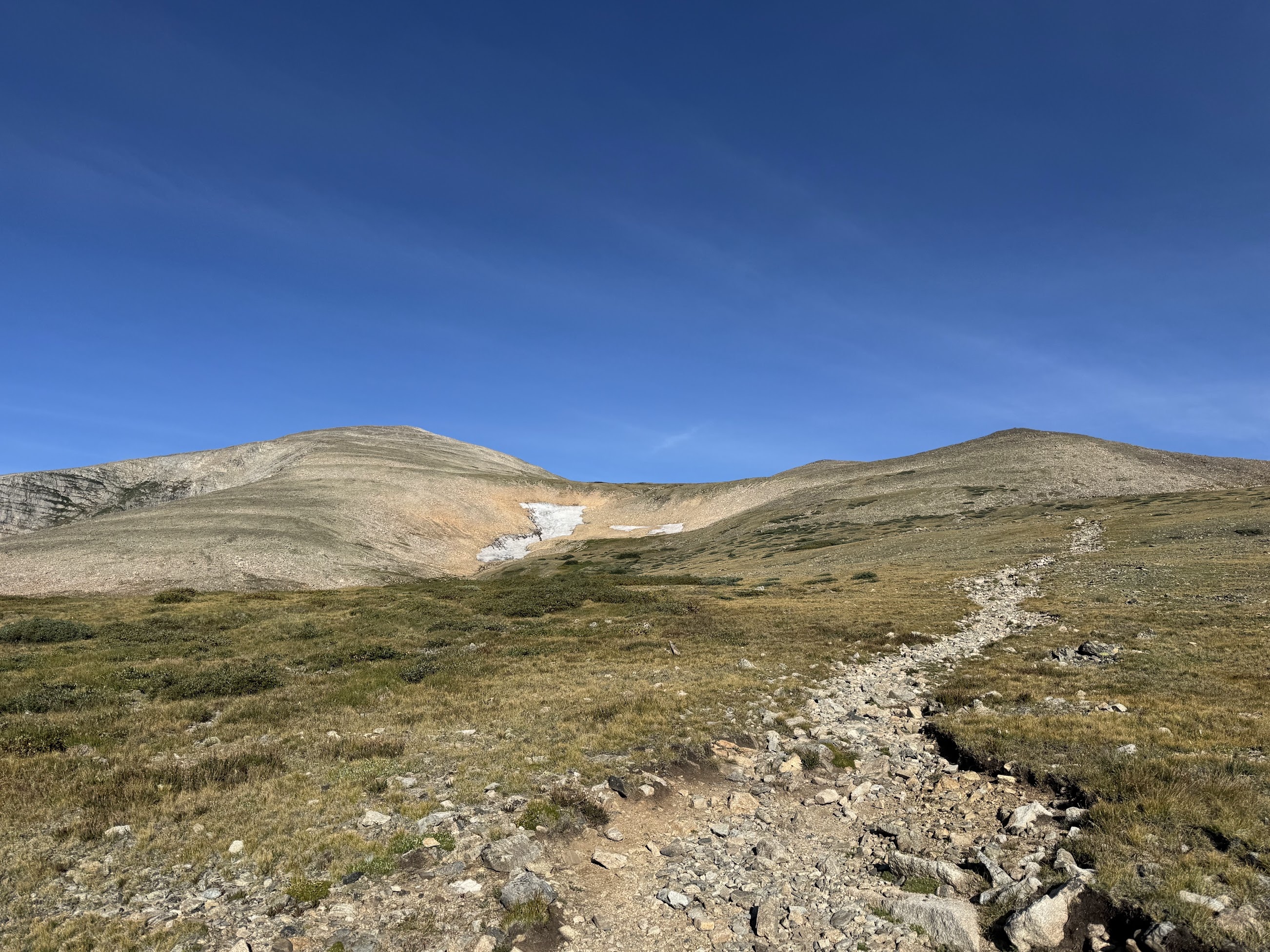
View of Mount Audubon From Eastern Slope

Marmot on Mount Audubon

== See also ==
- List of Colorado mountain ranges
- List of Colorado mountain summits
  - List of Colorado fourteeners
  - List of Colorado 4000 meter prominent summits
  - List of the most prominent summits of Colorado
- List of Colorado county high points
