= Pawnee Pass =

Mountain pass in Colorado, USA

- Interactive map of Pawnee Pass
- Elevation: 12,542 ft (3,823 m)
- Traversed by: trail

Third Approach
- Location: Boulder / Grand counties, Colorado, U.S.
- Range: Indian Peaks
- Coordinates: 40°04′33″N 105°38′06″W
- Topo map: USGS Monarch Lake

Pawnee Pass, elevation 12,542 ft (3,823 m), is a mountain pass that crosses the Continental Divide in the Indian Peaks of the Rocky Mountains of Colorado in the United States. It is located near the Long Lake Trailhead in the Brainard Lake Recreation Area of the Indian Peaks Wilderness. The Pawnee Pass Trail goes up the valley through wooded terrain and makes a short climb to Lake Isabelle. The Cascade Creek Trail continues west from Pawnee Pass.

== See also ==
- Southern Rocky Mountains
  - Front Range
- Colorado mountain passes
- Pawnee Peak
