= Watanga Mountain =

Mountain in Grand County, Colorado

- Location within Colorado

Highest point
- Elevation: 3,772.51 m (12,377.0 ft)
- Prominence: 610 ft (190 m)
- Parent peak: Hiamovi Mountain
- Isolation: 1.18 mi (1.90 km)
- Coordinates: 40°10′07″N 105°42′49″W

Geography
- District(s): Grand County, Colorado
- Parent range: Front Range, Rocky Mountains

Climbing
- Easiest route: 2

Watanga Mountain is a 12,377'-foot mountain of the Front Range in Grand County, Colorado, in Arapahoe National Forest. It is included in the Indian Peaks Wilderness Area. The summit provides dramatic views of the west side of Rocky Mountain National Park, the Continental Divide, and Lake Granby. The peak is remote but accessible via a long hike.

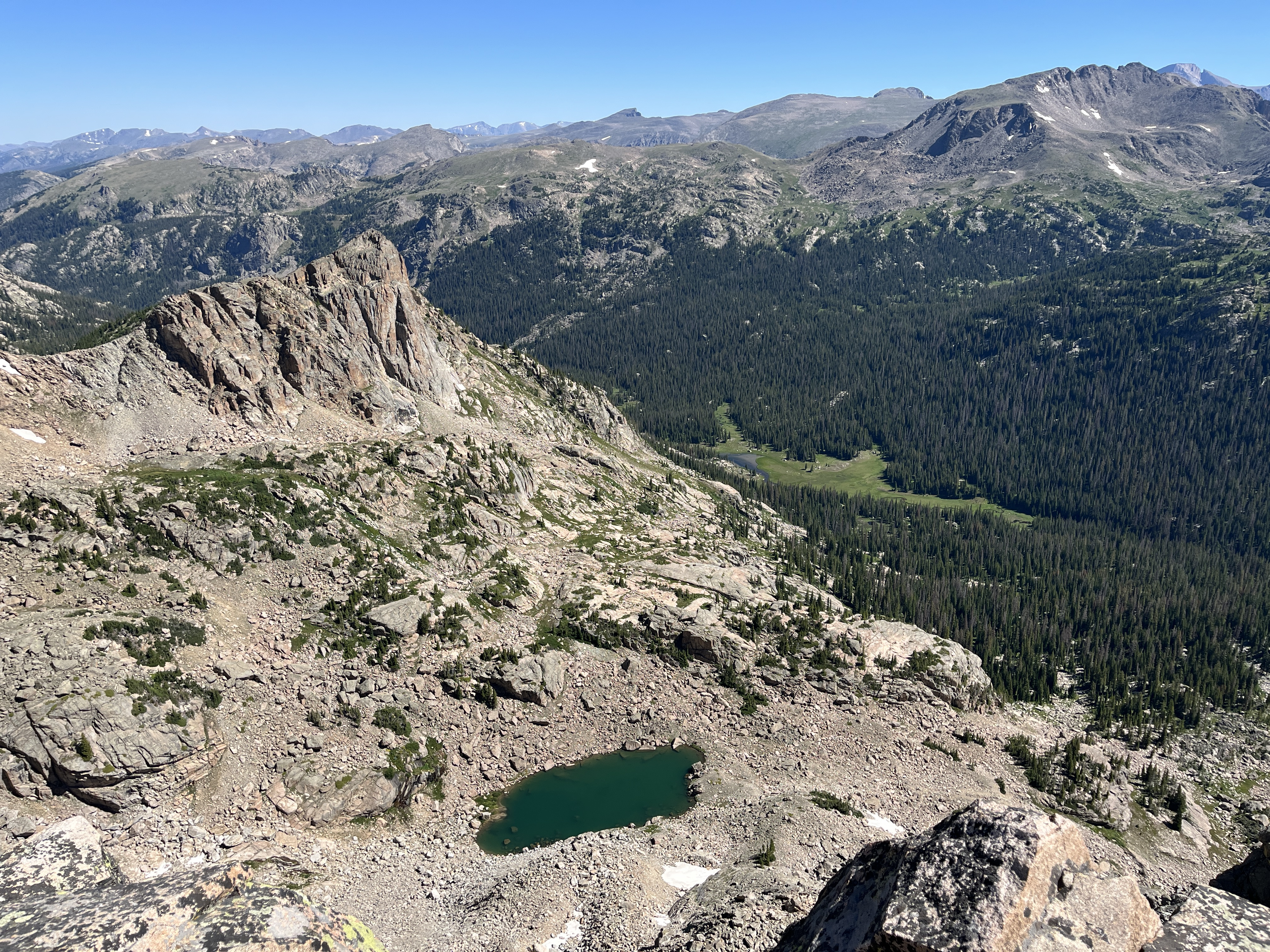
Viewing North from Watanga Mountain

== Name ==
The peak is named for an Arapahoe Chief Wa-ton-gha which translates to "Black Coyote". It was originally proposed in 1914 by Ellsworth Bethel, a biology teacher in Denver. He proposed naming 10 peaks south of Longs Peak for Native Tribes.

== Hiking Access ==
There is a forest service trail, Roaring Fork, to Lake Watanga from Lake Granby. This trail is 4 miles and 2500' vertical climb with an average grade of 10%. From that location at 10,800' elevation there is no trail, but one can hike directly east for 1 mile and 1500' to reach the summit. The rock formation at the summit can be safely climbed with no technical skills or equipment. Primitive camping is permitted in the area by permit. The lake and peak are in the Roaring Forks Backcountry zone.
