= Mount Bethel (Colorado) =

Mountain in the state of Colorado

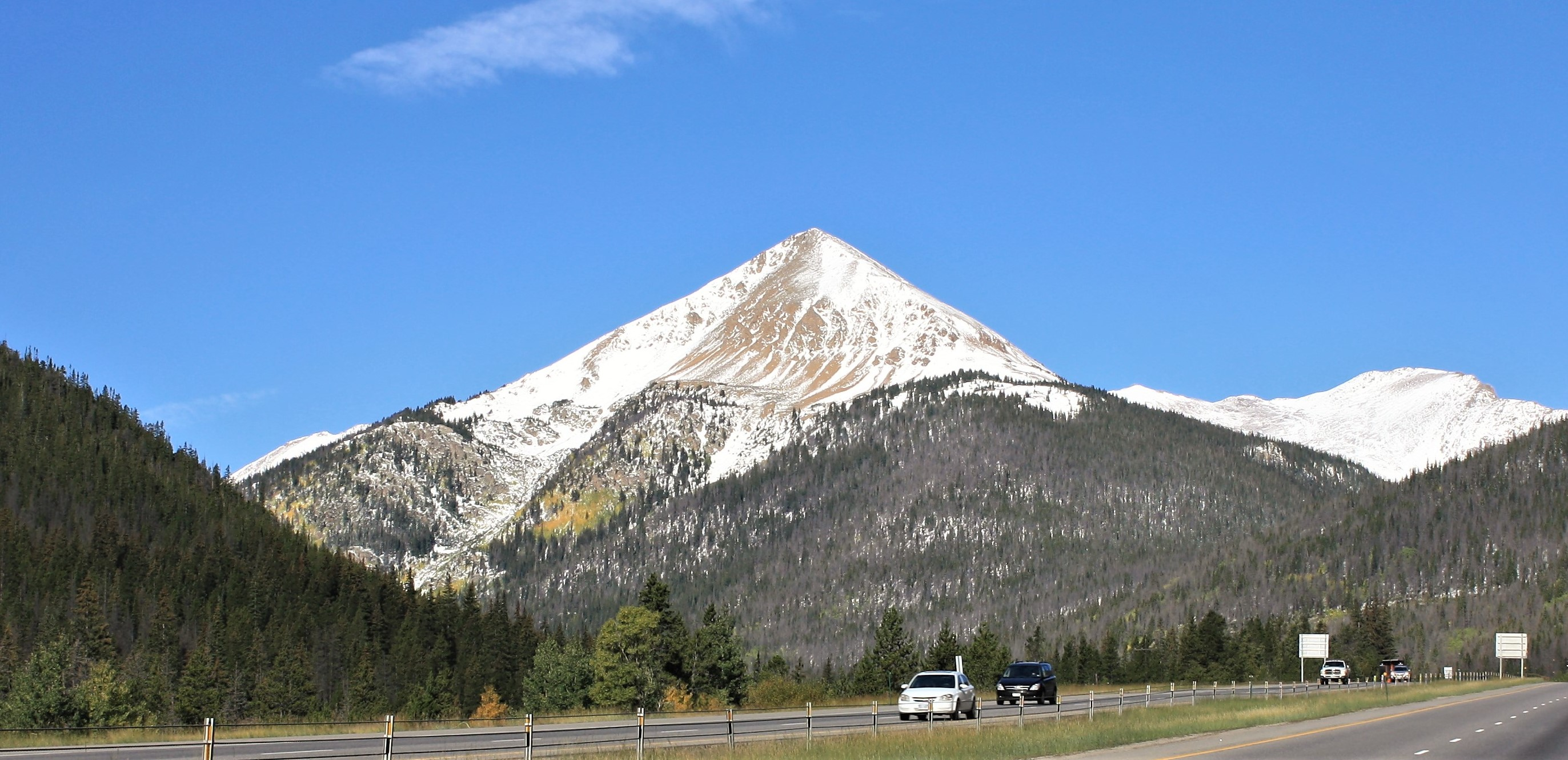
- East aspect

Highest point
- Elevation: 12,705 ft (3,872 m)
- Prominence: 425 ft (130 m)
- Parent peak: Pettingell Peak (13,559 ft)
- Isolation: 1.24 mi (2.00 km)
- Coordinates: 39°42′36″N 105°52′43″W

Naming
- Etymology: Ellsworth Bethel

Geography
- Location within Colorado Location within the United States
- Country: United States
- State: Colorado
- County: Clear Creek County
- Parent range: Rocky Mountains; Front Range
- Topo map: USGS Loveland Pass

Climbing
- Easiest route: Hiking class 2

Mount Bethel is a 12,705-foot (3,872 m) mountain summit in Clear Creek County, Colorado, United States.

== Description ==
Mount Bethel is set two miles (3.2 km) east of the Continental Divide in the Front Range which is a subrange of the Rocky Mountains. It is an iconic landmark viewed from westbound Interstate 70 as travelers approach the Eisenhower Tunnel. The mountain is located 50 miles (80 km) west of Denver on land managed by Arapaho National Forest. Precipitation runoff from the mountain's slopes drains into headwaters of Clear Creek which is a tributary of the South Platte River. Topographic relief is significant as the summit rises 2,300 feet (701 m) above the creek and Interstate 70 in one mile (1.6 km). Snow fences are a distinguishing feature on the mountain's slopes which are there to mitigate avalanches from threatening the Interstate. An ascent of the peak involves hiking four miles (6.4 km) with 2,680 feet (817 m) of elevation gain.

== Etymology ==
The mountain was originally called "Little Professor", in association with "Big Professor" which was the original name for Mount Sniktau on the opposite side of Clear Creek. The mountain's toponym was officially adopted in 1926 by the United States Board on Geographic Names to remember Ellsworth Bethel (1863–1925), American botanist. Bethel worked for the National Forest Service as a forest pathologist; he was a biology teacher at East Denver High School in Denver; and he named many of the peaks in Colorado's Indian Peaks Wilderness.

== Climate ==
According to the Köppen climate classification system, Mount Bethel is located in an alpine subarctic climate zone with cold, snowy winters, and cool to warm summers. Due to its altitude, it receives precipitation all year, as snow in winter, and as thunderstorms in summer, with a dry period in late spring. This climate supports the Loveland Ski Area two miles south of the peak.

== See also ==
- List of mountain peaks of Colorado

== Gallery ==
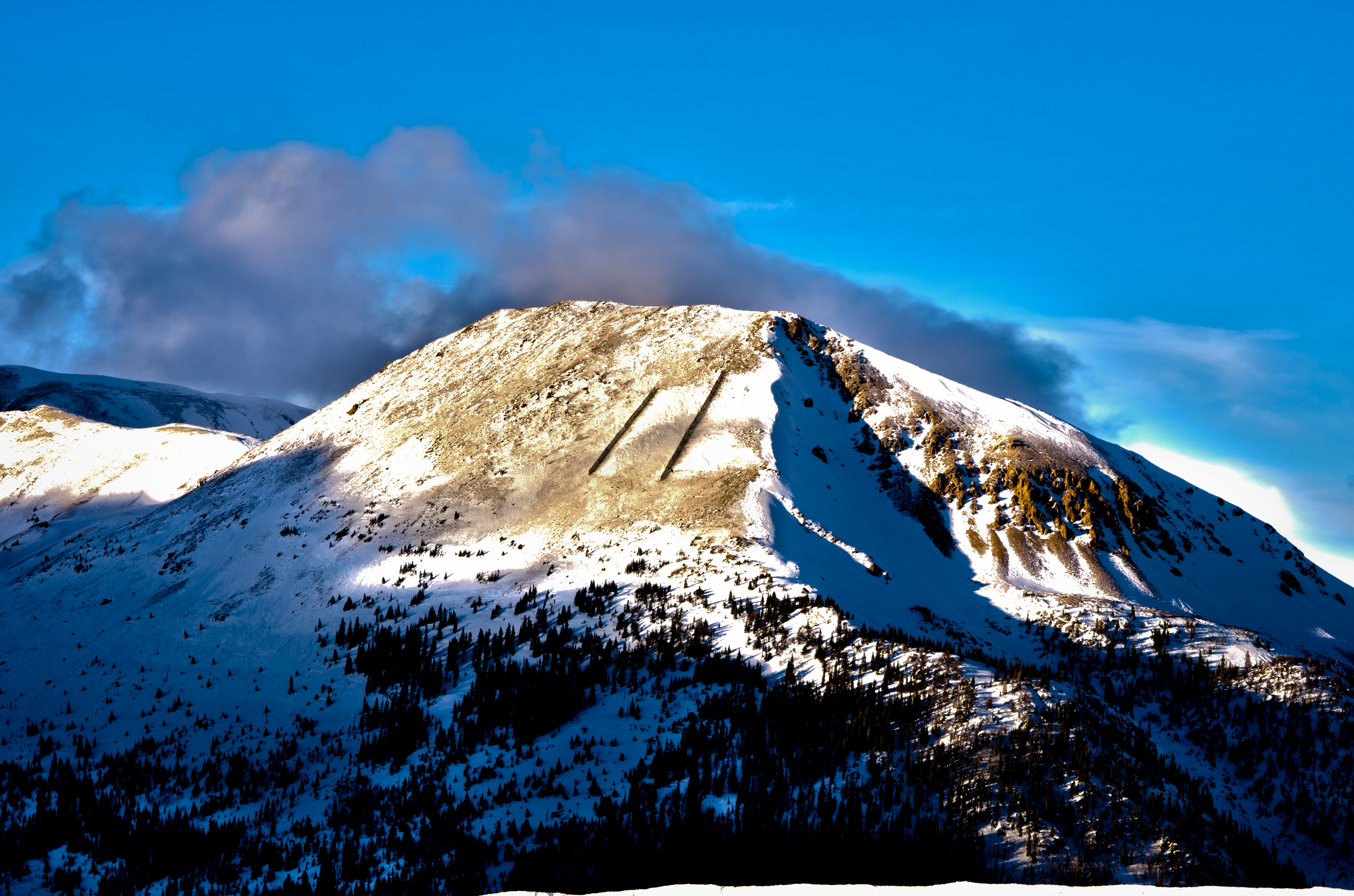
South aspect of Mount Bethel showing snow fences high on its slope

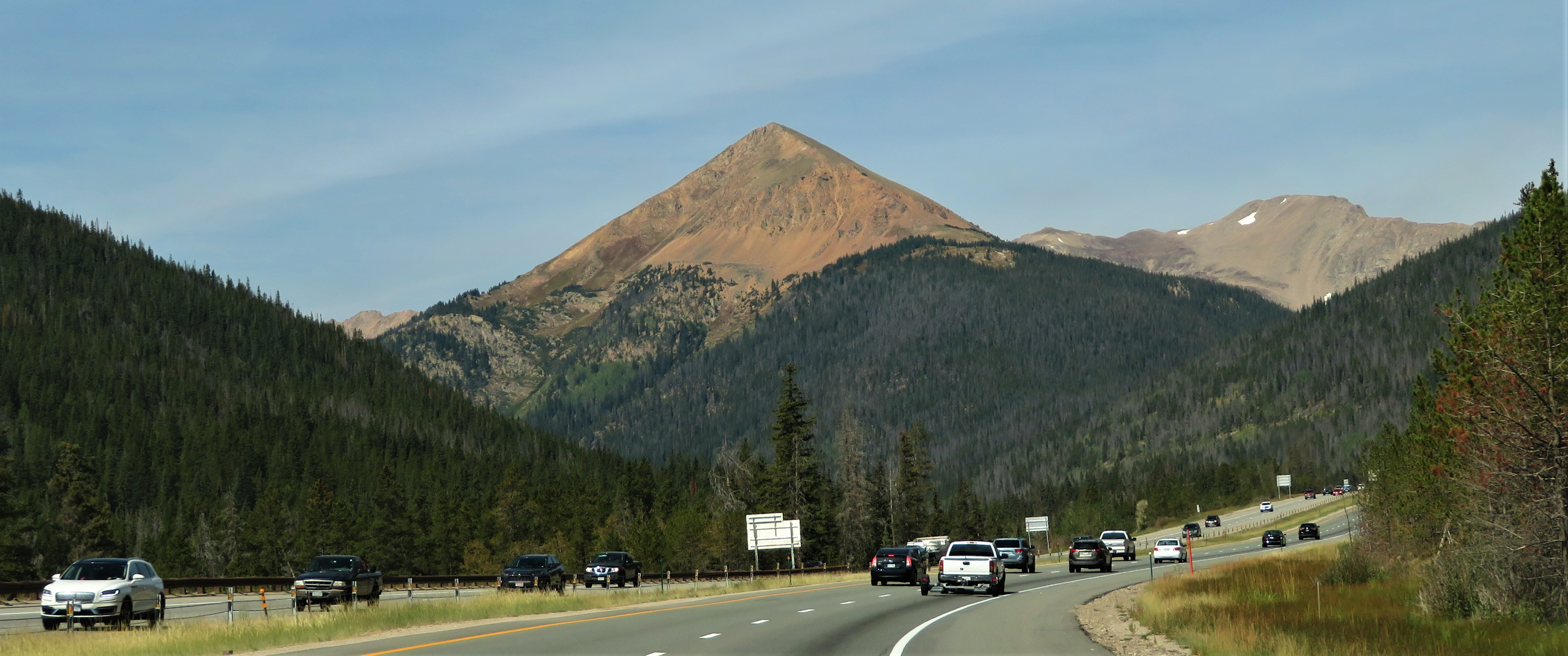
Mt. Bethel, with parent Pettingell Peak to right

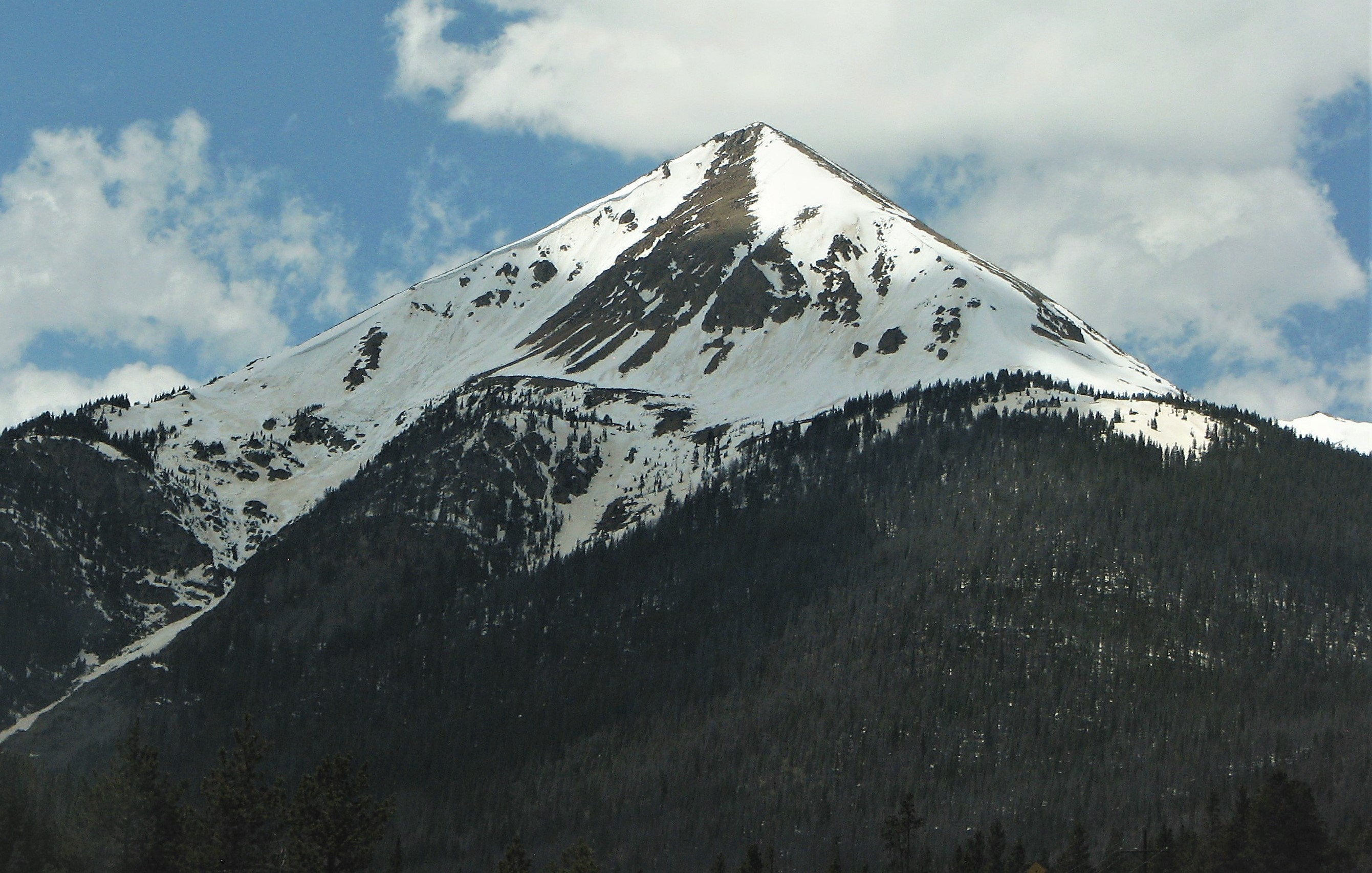
Mount Bethel
