= Monarch Lake =

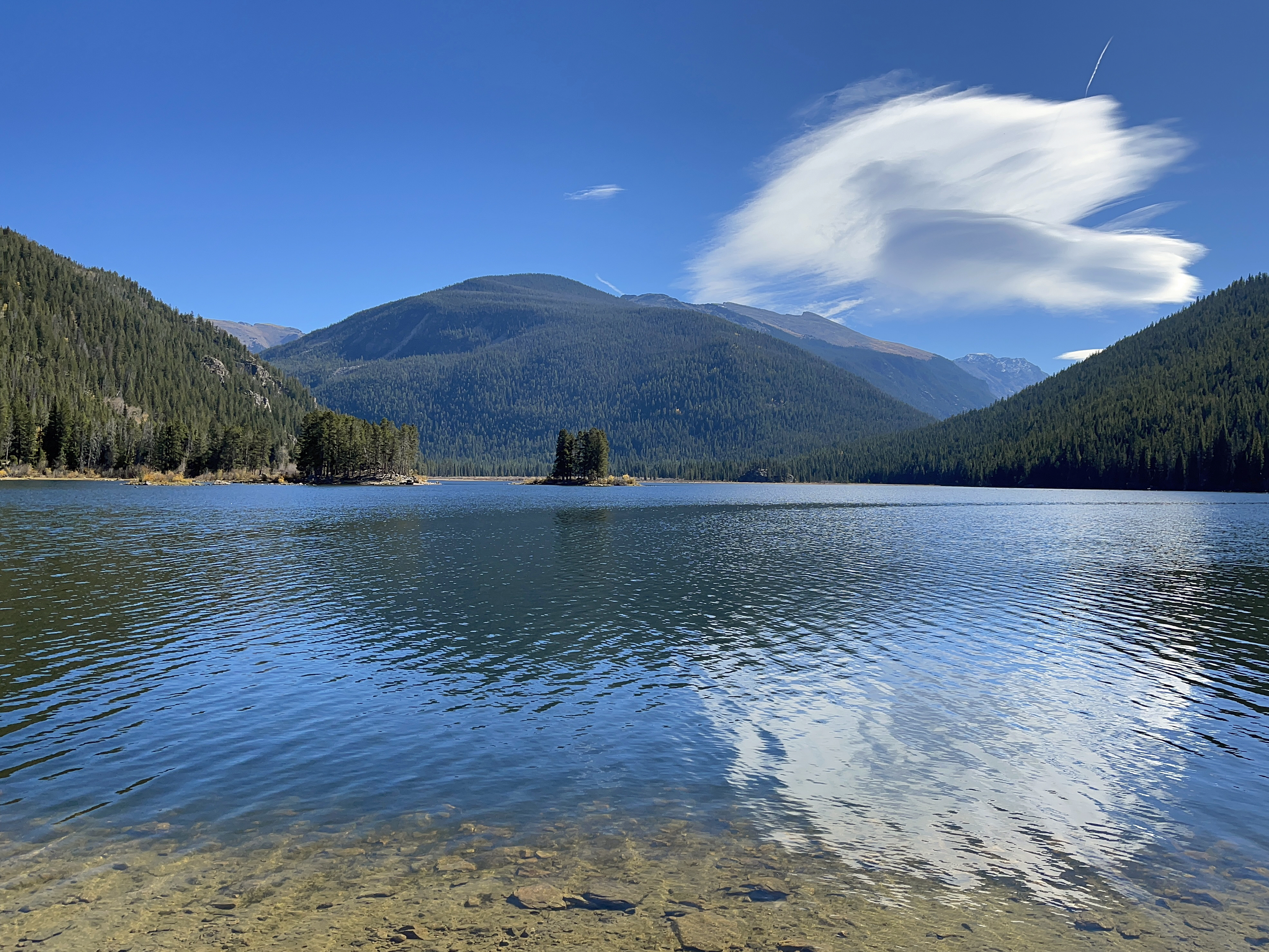
- The lake in October 2022

- The lake's location in Colorado
- Location: Grand County, Colorado
- Coordinates: 40°6′20.62″N 105°44′30.57″W
- Type: Reservoir
- Primary inflows: Arapaho Creek
- Primary outflows: Arapaho Creek
- Basin countries: United States
- Managing agency: United States Forest Service
- Built: 1929
- Water volume: 2,000 acre-feet (2,500,000 cubic meters)
- Surface elevation: 2,542 meters (8,340 feet)
- Frozen: Freezes in winter.
- Website: www.fs.usda.gov/r02/arp/recreation

Monarch Lake is a reservoir in Grand County, Colorado located within the Arapaho National Recreation Area. The reservoir is adjacent to the Indian Peaks Wilderness on its north and east sides. The Continental Divide National Scenic Trail passes along its south side, and the trailhead at the west end of the lake also marks the beginnings or ends of several other popular hiking trails.

== Dam ==
The dam (NID ID #CO00714) is an earthen dam that was completed in 1929. The United States Forest Service owns the dam, which is used for recreation and fishing. The primary inflow and outflow is Arapaho Creek.
