= Indian Peaks Wilderness =

Wilderness area in Colorado, United States

- IUCN category Ib (wilderness area)
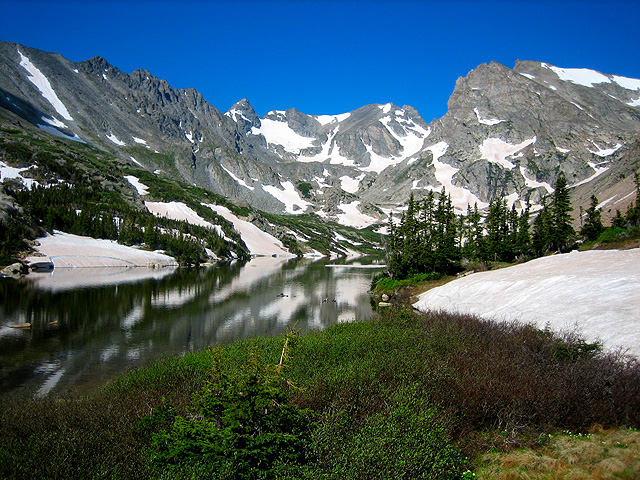
- Lake Isabelle below Navajo, Apache and Shoshoni Peaks

- Location within the United States
- Location: Grand / Boulder counties, Colorado, USA
- Nearest city: Boulder, CO
- Coordinates: 40°04′40″N 105°34′30″W
- Area: 76,711 acres (310.44 km^{2})
- Established: 1978
- Governing body: U.S. Forest Service / National Park Service

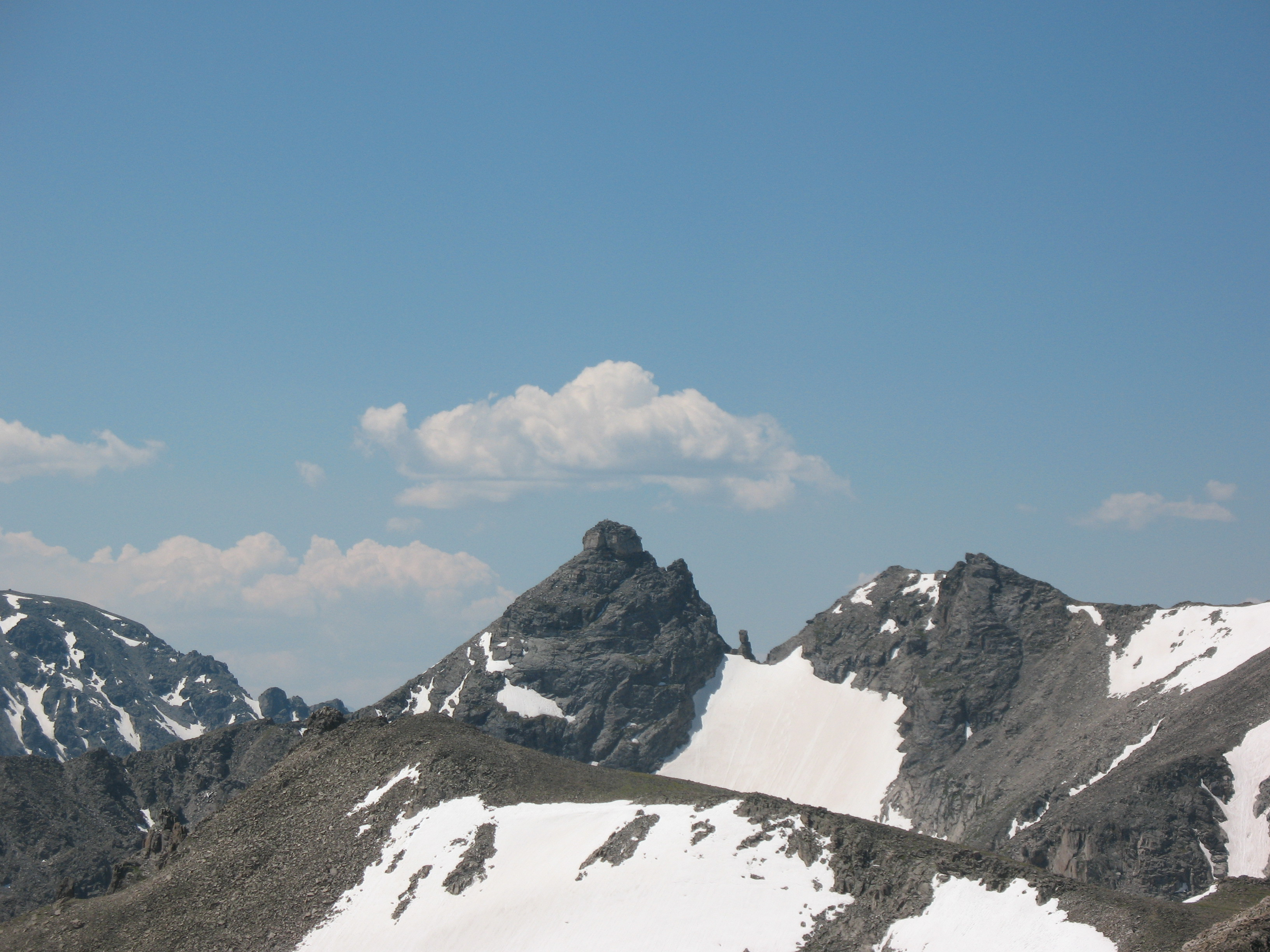
Navajo Peak, as seen from the top of Pawnee Peak

The Indian Peaks Wilderness is a 73,931 acre wilderness area in north central Colorado managed jointly by the United States Forest Service and the National Park Service within the Arapaho and Roosevelt National Forests and small parts of the southern section of Rocky Mountain National Park. It includes over 50 lakes, 28 trails, and numerous glaciers. It was founded as a protected area by an act of Congress in 1978. It borders the James Peak Wilderness to the south, and straddles the Continental Divide. The area receives high visitation due to its proximity to the Denver metropolitan area.

== Geography ==
The area encompasses a stretch of the Front Range. It includes 7 peaks over 13,000 feet (4,000 m) in elevation. The highest point is North Arapaho Peak at 13,502 feet (4,115 m). The peaks are all within 100 feet (30 m) of elevation of each other. A portion of the area, encompassing the headwaters of North Boulder Creek, is closed to the public as it is the City of Boulder watershed.

== Peak names ==
Many of the peaks inside the wilderness area are named after western Native American tribes. The naming scheme was the idea of botany teacher Ellsworth Bethel. By 1914, few of the peaks between Longs Peak and the Arapaho Peaks had names. In the spring of that year Bethel, inspired by the established name of the Arapaho Peaks, settled on 11 tribal names for various summits along the Divide. The United States Board on Geographic Names kept 6 of his names: Apache Peak, Arikaree Peak, Kiowa Peak, Navajo Peak, Ogalalla Peak and Pawnee Peak. He later added Paiute Peak, as his use of the Ute band was denied due to too many other Colorado features sharing that name. Other names, including Shoshoni Peak, Hiamovi Mountain, Satanta Peak and Watanga Mountain were added later.

Achonee Mountain in the Indian Peaks Wilderness was named after Cheyenne Peace Chief Ochinee, who negotiated for peace for his tribe and was killed in the Sand Creek massacre.

== History ==
The Indian Peaks were visited by Native Americans for several thousand years. The Paleo Indians would travel through here as a trail to get over the mountains. The Arapaho tribe lived and hunted in the area during the summer months, though little evidence remains of their activities. The tribe was forced to leave when mining started taking place in Indian Peaks.

Mining took place in the 1870s near the Arapaho Peaks. The Caribou mining district went through Arapaho Pass and the Caribou Pass. Later, a road was built to Arapaho Pass but it was never completed. (It is now the hiking trail that leads west from the Fourth of July trailhead.) The mining turned up little more than low-grade ore, and the mines were eventually abandoned. Remnants of mining activity are still found along the Arapaho Pass trail. Arapaho Glacier (now owned by the city of Boulder) is one of a few glaciers still left within the Indian Peaks Wilderness, but, being a part of Boulder's watershed, it is off-limits to hiking/camping. Several glaciers however, are still hikable and there are a number of routes to take. One set of glaciers, the Isabelle and Fair glaciers have a connecting trail that will send you over the Continental Divide.

Isabelle & Fair glaciers were discovered by Fred A. Fair in 1904 and were given their names by Prof. Junius Henderson, formerly a professor of the University of Colorado, who made a study of the glaciers in 1910 at Mr. Fair's request. Mr. Fair believed that water sometimes would be run through a tunnel from the Western Slope into Four Moff-limits, that Boulder and the mountain region would continue to grow in popularity, that someday Boulder will have to build a storage dam lower down that those in the Arapahoe glacier region and that a road to the Arapahoe or some other glacier will be constructed and become the most popular drive in the state.

The Denver and Interurban Railroad, which operated an electric line between Boulder and Denver for many years adopted the name "Glacier Route" at Mr. Fair's suggestion.

The figure 8 trails in the Arapahoe and Buchanan pass areas were made largely on the suggestion of Mr. Fair.

In January 1948, a plane carrying three airmen of the Civil Aeronautics Administration crashed about 500 feet below the summit of Navajo Peak due to severe turbulence. After four months and a five day expedition, a team of Denver and Boulder mountaineers recovered their bodies, reporting devastation to the mountainside. The wreckage of the plane is still present and visible in summer.

The area of the Indian Peaks was included in Enos Mills' original proposed boundaries for Rocky Mountain National Park. They were removed from the proposal after compromising with local and mining interests. Park superintendents tried to annex the Indian Peaks over the years, but the area would not receive protected status until 1978 when Congress designated the Indian Peaks Wilderness Area.

== Activities ==
Most visitors hike along the many trails, visiting high passes, lakes and waterfalls en route. The area also contains many notable mountaineering routes. The busiest area is Brainard Lake, which hosts several trailheads and a campground. Fishing is also found in many of the lakes and streams within the wilderness. In the winter, snowshoeing and cross country skiing are popular.

Mechanized recreation, such as mountain biking and the use of motorized vehicles, is prohibited in the Indian Peaks Wilderness.

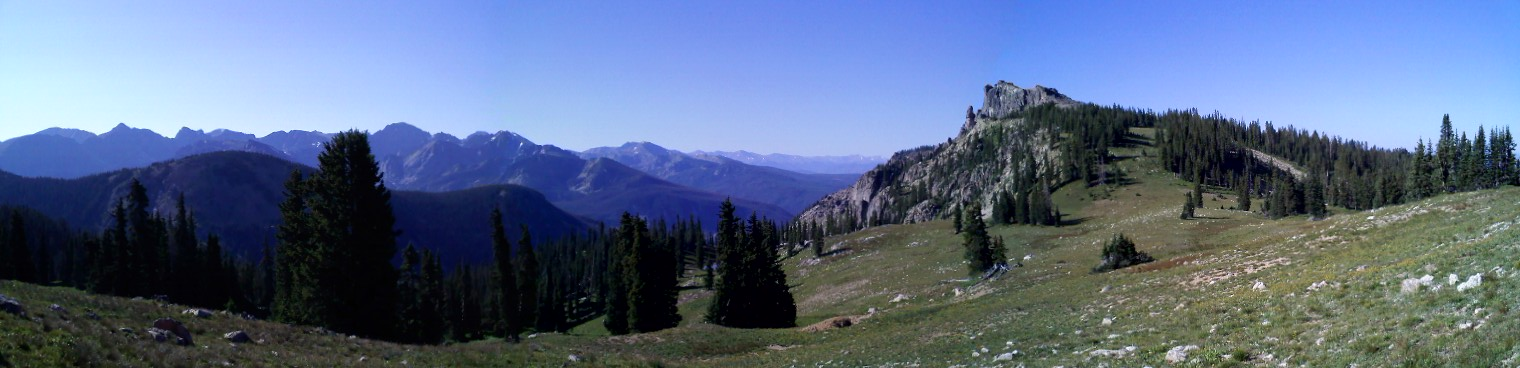
View SE from the saddle between Hiamovi Mtn. and Mt. Irving Hale.
