= Garden Glacier =

Glacier in Washington, United States

- Location within Washington (state)
- Type: Alpine glacier
- Location: Skagit, Snohomish and Chelan County, Washington, U.S.
- Coordinates: 48°17′59″N 121°00′35″W
- Length: .50 mi (0.80 km)
- Terminus: Icefall/Barren rock
- Status: Retreating

Garden Glacier is in Wenatchee and Mount Baker-Snoqualmie National Forests in the U.S. state of Washington. Garden Glacier is in two sections, located on the south and east slopes of Sinister Peak. The glacier is along the original approach route for the first ascent of Sinister Peak in 1939. Garden Glacier extends from 7,800 to 7,000 ft (2,400 to 2,100 m) and end in icefalls and barren rocks. Garden Glacier is separated by an arête from Chickamin Glacier to the north.

== See also ==
- List of glaciers in the United States
