= Grant Glacier =

Grant Glacier may refer to the following glaciers in United States:

- Grant Glacier (Montana), in Flathead National Forest, Montana
- Grant Glacier (Washington), in Wenatchee National Forest, Washington
