= Sinister Peak =

Mountain in Washington (state), United States

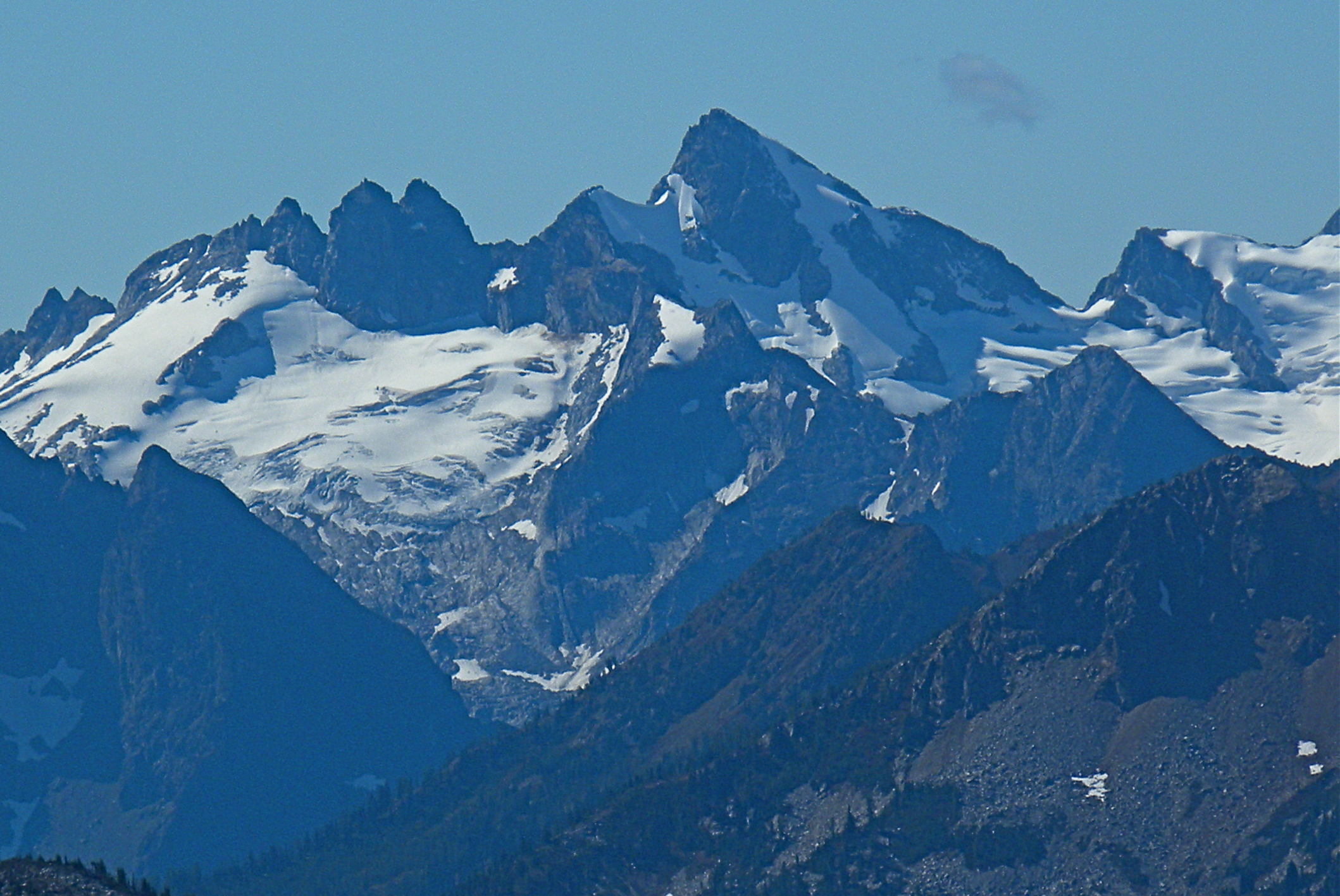
- Sinister Peak from Maple Pass area

Highest point
- Elevation: 8,440+ ft (2,570+ m)
- Prominence: 840 ft (260 m)
- Coordinates: 48°18′00″N 121°00′35″W

Geography
- Location within Washington (state) Location within the United States
- Interactive map of Sinister Peak
- Location: Chelan and Skagit County, Washington, U.S.
- Parent range: Cascade Range
- Topo map: USGS Dome Peak

Climbing
- First ascent: Lloyd Anderson, Jim Crooks, Clint Kelley, May 29, 1939
- Easiest route: class 3

Sinister Peak (8,440+ ft (2,570+ m)) is in Mount Baker-Snoqualmie and Wenatchee National Forests in the U.S. state of Washington. It is situated in Glacier Peak Wilderness and the North Cascades. Not quite 1 mi (1.6 km) east of Dome Peak, Sinister Peak is along a high ridge connecting the two peaks. The Chickamin Glacier is on the north slopes of Sinister Peak while the Garden Glacier is just southeast. Though some of the routes to the summit are technical, it can be reached by a moderate scramble.

== Climate ==
Sinister Peak is located in the marine west coast climate zone of western North America. Most weather fronts originating in the Pacific Ocean travel northeast toward the Cascade Mountains. As fronts approach the North Cascades, they are forced upward by the peaks of the Cascade Range, causing them to drop their moisture in the form of rain or snowfall onto the Cascades (Orographic lift). As a result, the west side of the North Cascades experiences high precipitation, especially during the winter months in the form of snowfall. During winter months weather is usually cloudy, but due to high pressure systems over the Pacific Ocean that intensify during summer months, there is often little or no cloud cover during the summer.

== Geology ==
The North Cascades features some of the most rugged topography in the Cascade Range with craggy peaks and ridges, deep glacial valleys, and granite spires. Geological events occurring many years ago created the diverse topography and drastic elevation changes over the Cascade Range leading to various climate differences.

The history of the formation of the Cascade Mountains dates back millions of years ago to the late Eocene Epoch. With the North American Plate overriding the Pacific Plate, episodes of volcanic igneous activity persisted. In addition, small fragments of the oceanic and continental lithosphere called terranes created the North Cascades about 50 million years ago.

During the Pleistocene period dating back over two million years ago, glaciation advancing and retreating repeatedly scoured the landscape leaving deposits of rock debris. The U-shaped cross section of the river valleys is a result of recent glaciation. Uplift and faulting in combination with glaciation have been the dominant processes which have created the tall peaks and deep valleys of the North Cascades area.

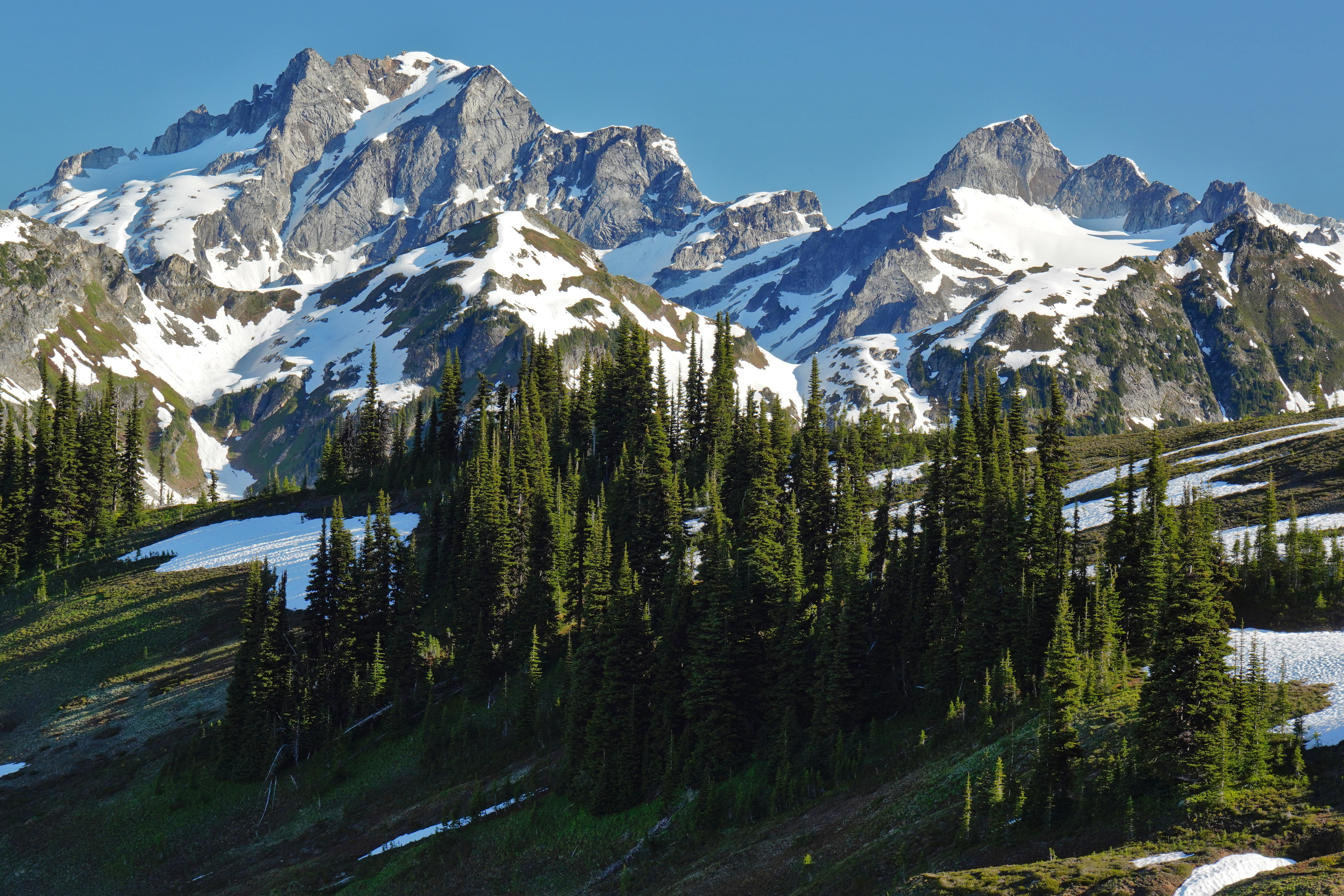
Dome Peak (left) and Sinister Peak (right) viewed from the south at Miners Ridge

== See also ==
- Geography of the North Cascades
