= North Star Mountain =

Mountain in Washington (state), United States

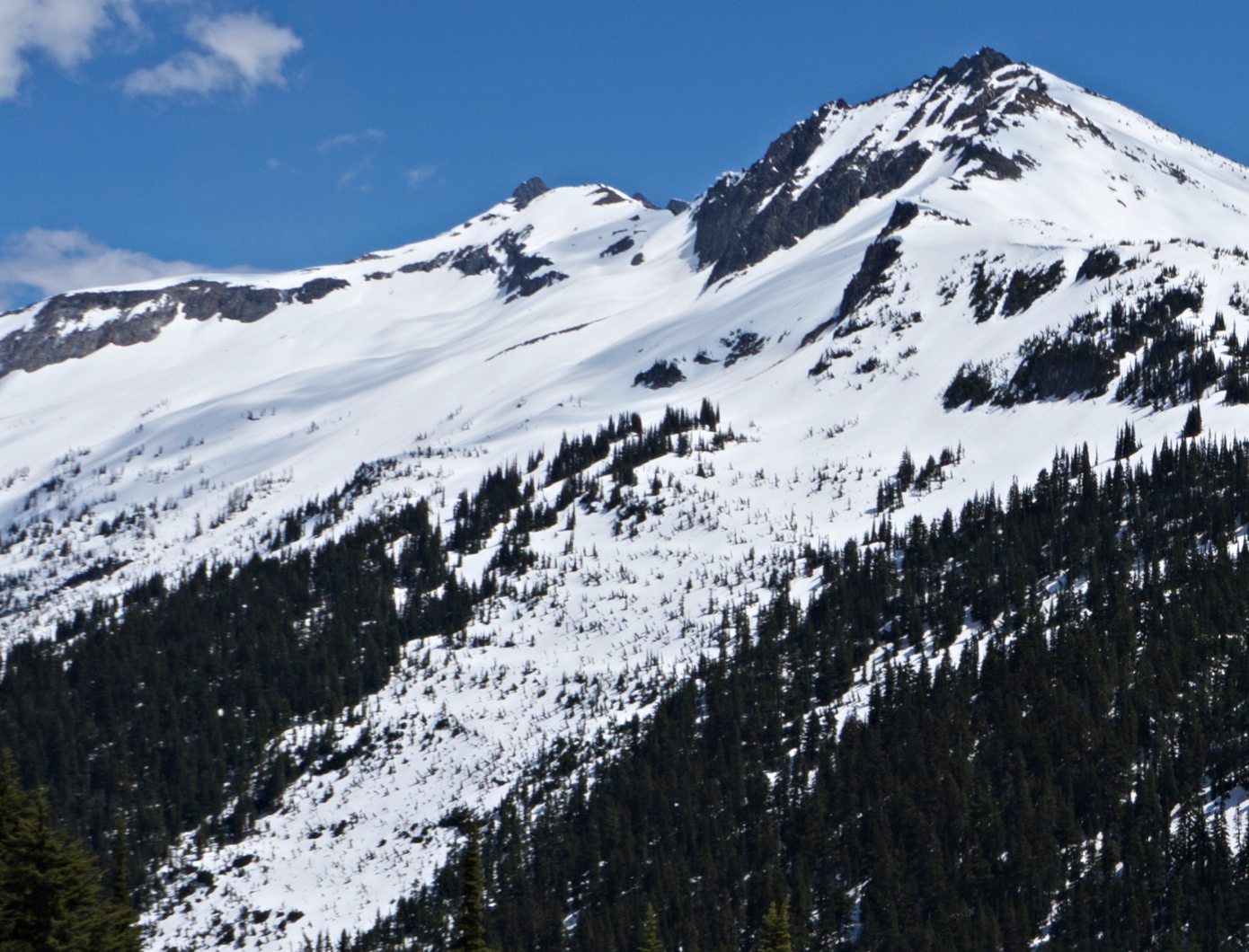
- North Star centered, with Cloudy Peak upper right As seen from Suiattle Pass

Highest point
- Elevation: 8,096 ft (2,468 m)
- Prominence: 936 ft (285 m)
- Parent peak: Bonanza Peak (9,511 ft)
- Isolation: 1.91 mi (3.07 km)
- Coordinates: 48°13′22″N 120°54′03″W

Geography
- Location within Washington (state) Location within the United States
- Interactive map of North Star Mountain
- Country: United States
- State: Washington
- County: Chelan
- Protected area: Glacier Peak Wilderness
- Parent range: North Cascades; Cascade Range
- Topo map: USGS Suiattle Pass

Geology
- Rock age: Cretaceous

Climbing
- Easiest route: Scrambling

North Star Mountain is an 8,096-foot (2,468-metre) mountain summit located in the Glacier Peak Wilderness of the North Cascades, in Chelan County of Washington state. Its nearest neighbor is Cloudy Peak 0.9 mi (1.4 km) to the southwest, and the nearest higher neighbor is Bonanza Peak, 1.9 mi (3.1 km) to the northeast. North Star Mountain was originally named Bonanza Peak, and vice versa, but the USGS’ first 1904 topographic map of the region mistakenly interchanged the names. Precipitation runoff from North Star drains into Agnes Creek and Railroad Creek, both tributaries of the Chelan River.

== Geology ==
North Star Mountain is located in the Cloudy Pass batholith, an intrusive formation that was formed approximately 20 million years ago, during the early Miocene. The history of the formation of the Cascade Mountains dates back millions of years ago to the late Eocene Epoch. With the North American Plate overriding the Pacific Plate, episodes of volcanic igneous activity persisted. Glacier Peak, a stratovolcano that is 12.5 mi (20.1 km) southwest of North Star Mountain, began forming in the mid-Pleistocene. In addition, small fragments of the oceanic and continental lithosphere called terranes created the North Cascades about 50 million years ago.

During the Pleistocene period dating back over two million years ago, glaciation advancing and retreating repeatedly scoured and shaped the landscape. Glaciation was most prevalent approximately 18,000 years ago, and the majority of valleys were ice-free by 12,000 years ago. Uplift and faulting in combination with glaciation have been the dominant processes which have created the tall peaks and deep valleys of the North Cascades area. Subduction and tectonic activity in the area began during the late cretaceous period, about 90 million years ago. Extensive volcanic activity began to take place in the oligocene, about 35 million years ago.

== Climate ==
North Star Mountain is located in the marine west coast climate zone of western North America. Weather fronts originating in the Pacific Ocean travel northeast toward the Cascade Mountains. As fronts approach the North Cascades, they are forced upward by the peaks of the Cascade Range, making them drop their moisture in the form of rain or snowfall onto the Cascades (Orographic lift). As a result, the west side of the North Cascades experiences high precipitation, especially during the winter months in the form of snowfall. Due to maritime influence, snow tends to be wet and heavy, resulting in high avalanche danger. This climate supports the Grant Glacier in a cirque on the north side of the mountain. During winter months, weather is usually cloudy, but, due to high pressure systems over the Pacific Ocean that intensify in the summer months, there is often little or no cloud cover throughout summer.

== Gallery ==
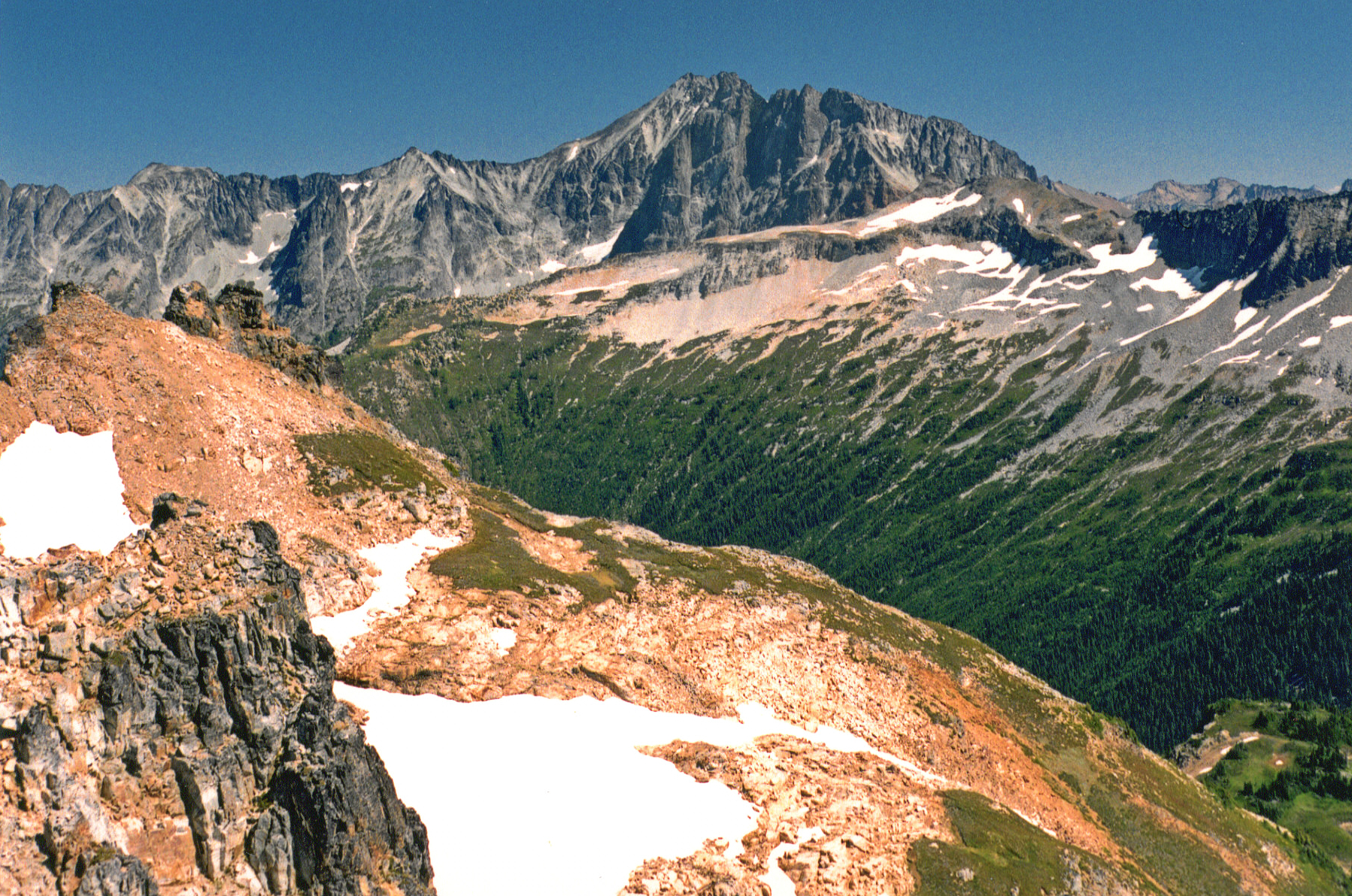
North Star Mountain is the undistinguished feature in upper right with patches of snow, with Bonanza Peak looming behind it. This view is from Plummer Mountain.

== See also ==
- Geography of the North Cascades
- List of mountain peaks of Washington (state)
