= Image Lake =

Lake in Snohomish County, Washington, USA

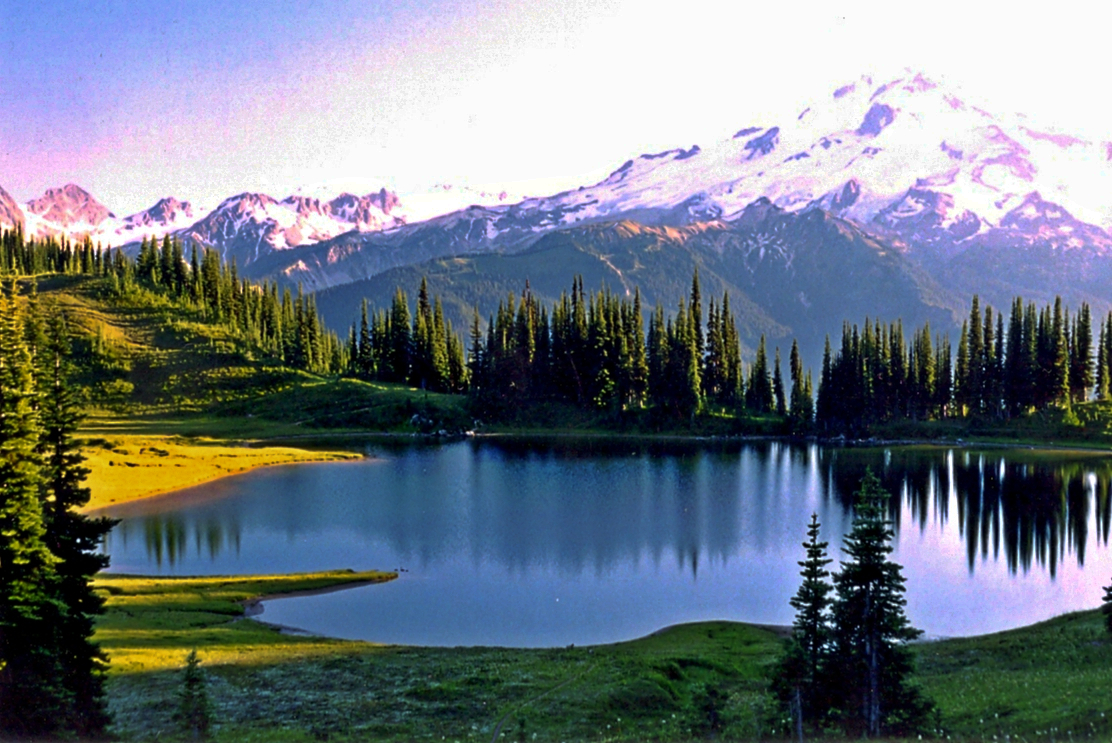
- Image Lake at sunset

- Location within Washington (state) Location within the United States
- Location: Cascade Range, Snohomish County, Washington
- Coordinates: 48°12′27″N 121°0′30″W
- Type: Tarn
- Primary outflows: Miners Creek
- Catchment area: Skagit River
- Basin countries: United States
- Surface area: 3–4 acres (1.2–1.6 ha)
- Surface elevation: 6,056 ft (1,846 m)

Image Lake is a tarn in Glacier Peak Wilderness, in the North Cascades of Washington, United States. The lake is surrounded by Plummer Peak to the east, a lookout point to the west, the Miners Creek drainage and Glacier Peak to the south, and Canyon Lake to the north. The course of the popular Miners Ridge Trail skirts the lake. Glacier Peak can be seen from the outlet of the lake, and the peak reflected in the lake is a popular photographic subject.

As a result of a relatively mild temperate climate with ample precipitation, the areas around Image Lake boast rich natural habitats with many species of plants, insects, rodents, and large mammals. Native Americans took advantage of these resources, and may have inhabited the area seasonally. However, human activity such as hunting, fishing, and mining, and recreational overuse increased after the arrival of Europeans. As a result, some areas experienced significant environmental degradation near the end of the nineteenth century and the early twentieth century, including the eradication of large predatory animals. Recreational overuse and the presence of livestock were especially problematic in the early to mid-twentieth century.

== Hydrology ==
Image Lake has a drainage basin with an area of less than 1 square mile (2.6 km^{2}). Its primary outflow is a small, unnamed creek that feeds into Miners Creek, which in turn drains into the Suiattle River. The Suiattle River drains into the Skagit River, which in turn empties into Puget Sound. The highest point in the drainage basin is nearly 7,000 feet (2,100 m) above sea level. The lake itself is roughly circular, and has an area of about 3–4 acres (1.2–1.6 ha).

== History ==
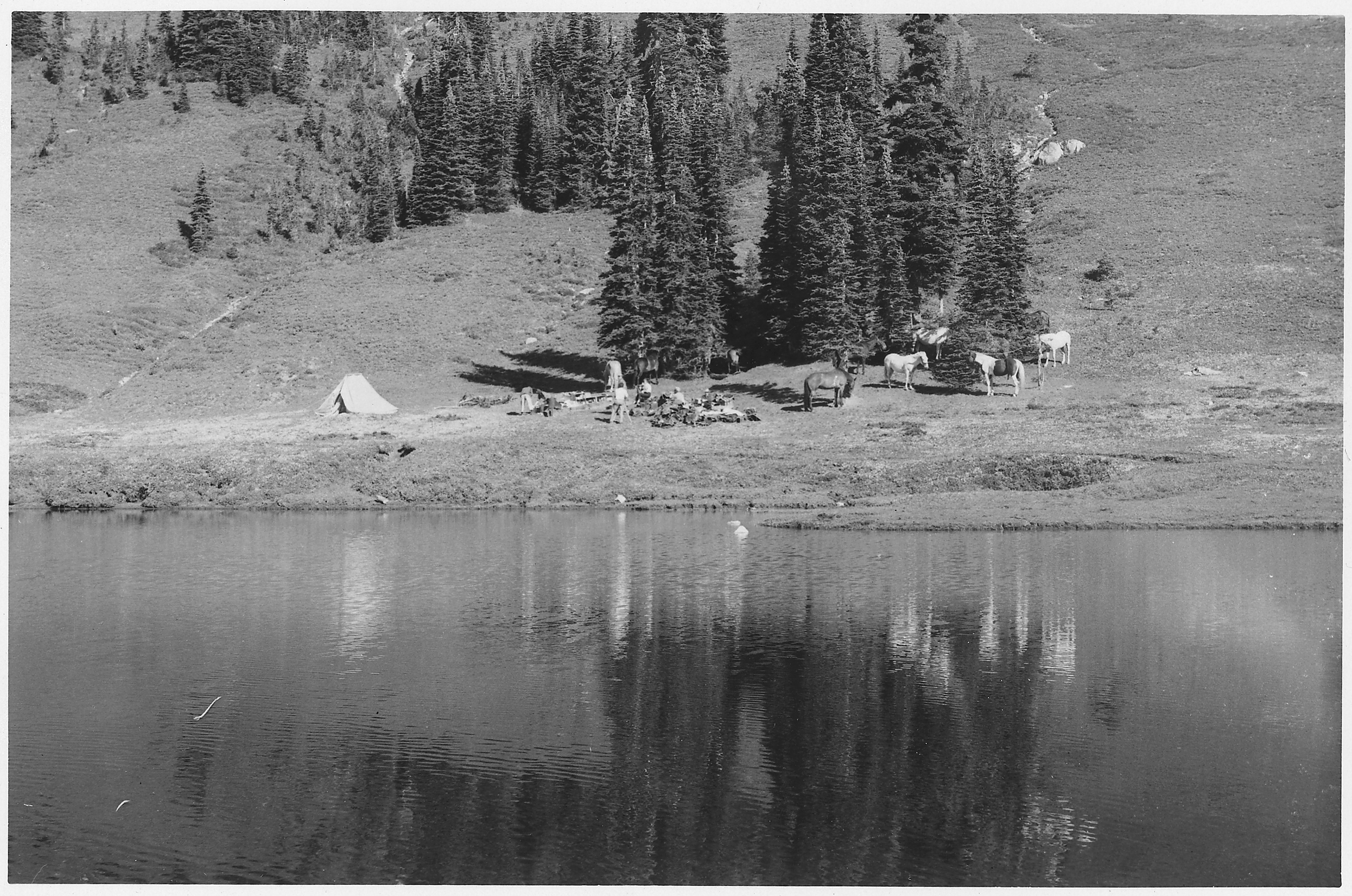
Horse camp at Image Lake, circa 1920–1930

There is archaeological evidence that Native Americans had been using the area for at least 8,500 years before present, and had been present at Cascade Pass for at least 9,600 years. Wild game was apparently utilized by Native Americans, and obsidian was exploited since at least 5,000 years before present. They used several routes that passed through the region, and may have used its natural resources during the summer. Some tribes personified the mountains and incorporated them into their religions. Many of these routes followed ridge tops in order to avoid the dense brush and avalanche chutes of the valley bottoms. Horses were also used in the eighteenth century. There was a trail used by Native Americans as a route between Lake Chelan and the Suiattle River valley. The trail apparently traversed Cloudy Pass, which is some distance east of the lake. It was later used by miners and shepherds in the early 1900s. Shepherding was banned on Miners Ridge in 1940, but the popularity of the area continued to grow. Due to the area's popularity, the surrounding meadows deteriorated as a result of livestock grazing and off-trail hiking. As a result, livestock were allocated to the nearby Lady Camp Basin and hardier plants were introduced to the area surrounding the lake.

Image Lake was originally called "Mirror Lake", but was given its present name on April 10, 1940 by Hugh Ritter and Rudo Fromme, who were employees of the US Forest Service. The lake was first surveyed on July 14, 1939 by the Forest Service.

Kennecott Copper Corporation, as of 1988, planned to dig an open-pit copper mine in a basin approximately one mile east of Image Lake. However, protests by various advocacy groups, such as The Mountaineers, prevented the plan from developing further.

In 2003, floods washed out large portions of the Suiattle River Road, beginning 12.5 miles (20.1 km) from the trailhead, making Image Lake more accessible from Holden or Trinity. As of August 2013, construction crews are repairing the road, which was scheduled to be open by 2014. However, the Forest Service has a limited budget, and the effort to rebuild the road has been criticized by environmental groups, partly because of the lower number of visitors, since access from the west has become almost impossible. Since Image Lake is all but inaccessible from the west, it is necessary for hikers to access the lake from the east, via a two-day hike from Holden or Trinity.

== Hiking ==
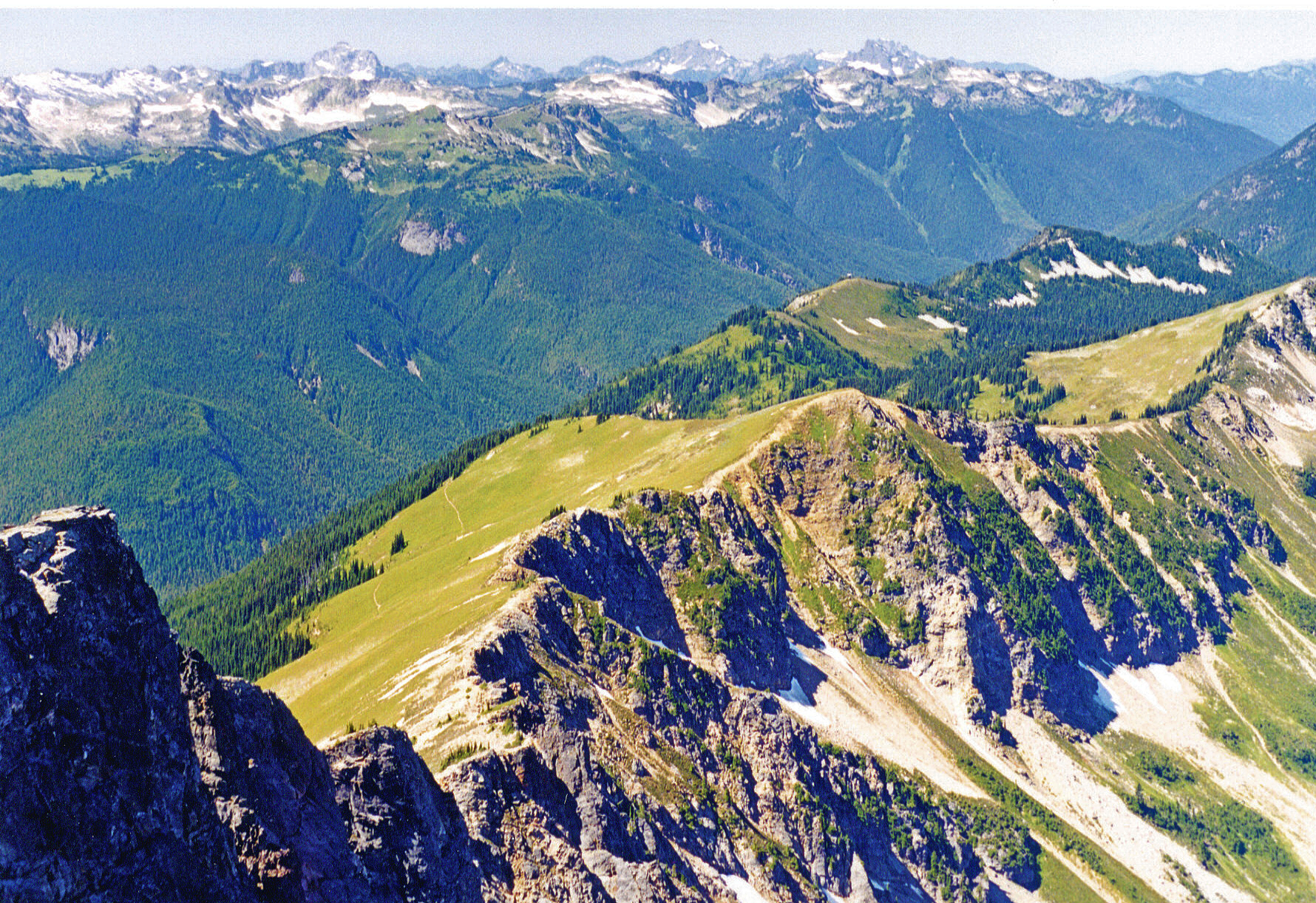
Miners Ridge seen from Plummer Mountain

The trail to Image Lake can be accessed from the Suiattle River Road. It can also be accessed from Holden, on the east side of the Cascade crest, west of Lake Chelan. The trail begins by following the Suiattle River, eventually reaching open meadows with views of Glacier Peak. There is also an alpine route that leads from the Miners Ridge Trail to Plummer Mountain, and a little used trail that leads to Canyon Lake and Totem Pass, which is about 4 miles (6.4 km) southeast of Dome Peak.

== See also ==
- List of lakes in Washington (state)
