= Blue Glacier (Chelan County, Washington) =

Glacier in Chelan County, Washington, United States

- Location within Washington (state)
- Type: Alpine glacier
- Location: Chelan County, Washington, U.S.
- Coordinates: 48°18′31″N 120°59′26″W
- Length: .25 mi (0.40 km)
- Terminus: Icefall/Barren rock
- Status: Retreating

Blue Glacier is in the U.S. state of Washington. Blue Glacier is in Wenatchee National Forest and flows east from Gunsight Peak, descending from nearly 8,000 to 6,800 ft (2,400 to 2,100 m). The much larger Chickamin Glacier is on the west side of Gunsight Peak.

== See also ==
- List of glaciers in the United States
