= Sitting Bull (disambiguation) =

Sitting Bull (c. 1831–1837 – 1890) was a Hunkpapa Lakota leader who led his people during years of resistance against United States government policies.

Sitting Bull may also refer to:

- Sitting Bull (film), a 1954 American-Mexican film directed by Sidney Salkow and René Cardona, a fictionalised depiction of the war between Sitting Bull and the American forces
- Sitting Bull (South Australia), a rocky outcrop in the Flinders Ranges
- Sitting Bull College, a college in Fort Yates, North Dakota
- Sitting Bull Mountain, a mountain in Washington state, US
- Sitting Bull Trophy, an American football trophy in Fort Yates, North Dakota

== See also ==
- Sitting Bull Falls, a series of waterfalls in the Lincoln National Forest, New Mexico
