= Sitting Bull Mountain =

Mountain in Washington (state), United States

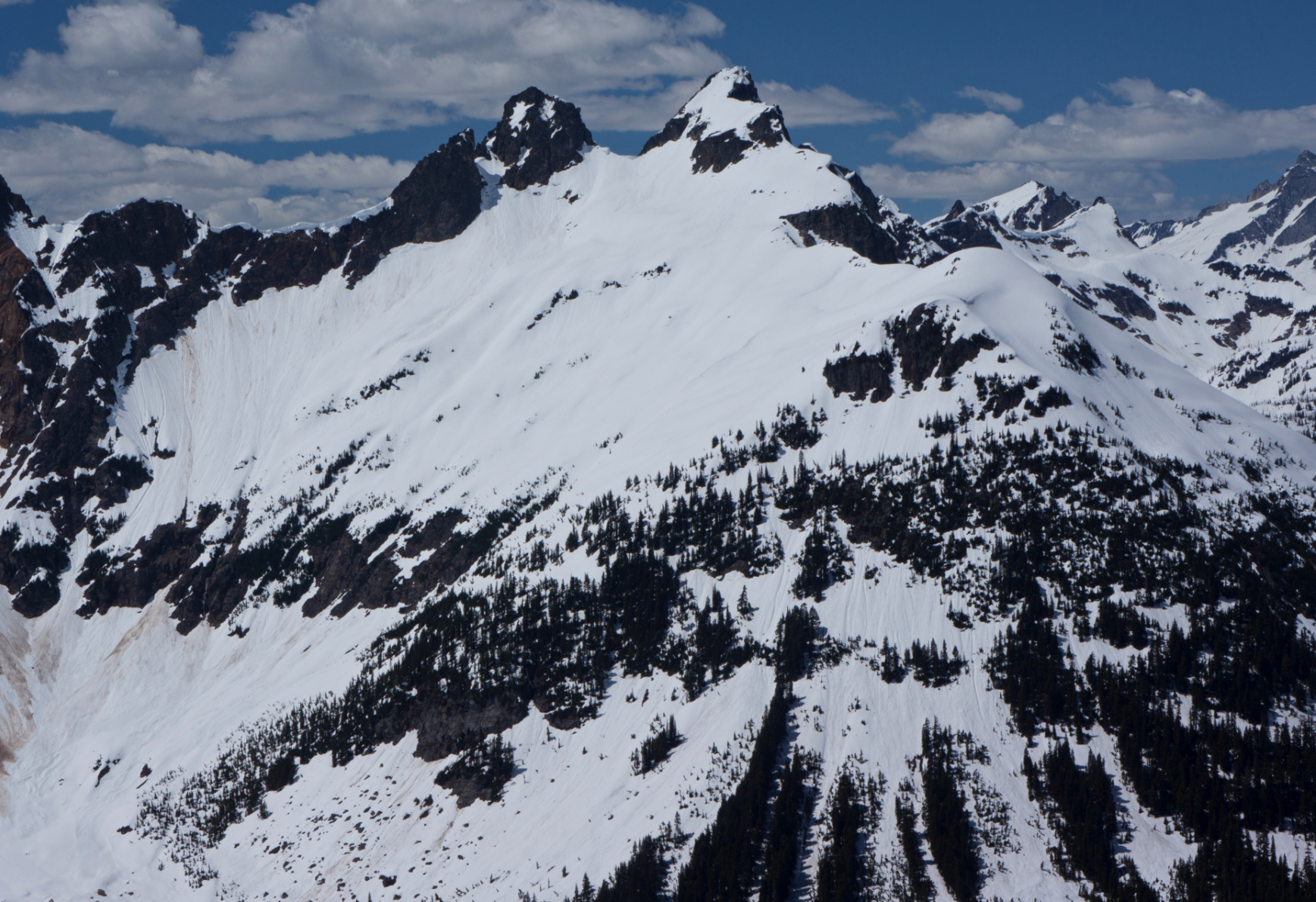
- Sitting Bull Mountain seen from Cloudy Pass

Highest point
- Elevation: 7,759 ft (2,365 m)
- Prominence: 599 ft (183 m)
- Parent peak: Plummer Mountain 7870 ft
- Isolation: 1.53 mi (2.46 km)
- Coordinates: 48°13′39″N 120°57′34″W

Geography
- Location within Washington (state) Location within the United States
- Interactive map of Sitting Bull Mountain
- Country: United States
- State: Washington
- County: Snohomish / Chelan
- Protected area: Glacier Peak Wilderness
- Parent range: Cascade Range
- Topo map: USGS Suiattle Pass

Geology
- Rock age: Cretaceous
- Mountain type: Metamorphic brown Gneiss

Climbing
- First ascent: 1921 party of The Mountaineers
- Easiest route: Scrambling

Sitting Bull Mountain is a 7,759-foot (2,365-metre) double summit mountain in the North Cascades of Washington state. The north summit is higher than the south peak (7680+ ft), and easier to climb (class 3 vs. class 4), however neither peak sees much climbing activity. Sitting Bull Mountain is located 2.1 mi (3.4 km) northwest of Suiattle Pass in the heart of the Glacier Peak Wilderness. Its nearest higher peak is Plummer Mountain, 1.51 mi (2.43 km) to the south-southwest. The mountain is situated on the crest of the Cascade Range, on the shared border of Snohomish County and Chelan County. Precipitation runoff from Sitting Bull Mountain drains east into Agnes Creek which is a tributary of the Stehekin River, or west into Canyon Creek which is a tributary of the Suiattle River.

== Geology ==
Subduction and tectonic activity in the area began during the late cretaceous period, about 90 million years ago. The area was previously an oceanic environment, consisting mainly of sedimentary and volcanic rocks. Extensive volcanic activity began to take place in the oligocene, about 35 million years ago. However, mountain building in the area did not begin until the miocene, approximately 10 million years ago. Sitting Bull Mountain is located in the Cloudy Pass batholith, an intrusive formation that was formed approximately 20 million years ago, during the early miocene. Glacier Peak, a stratovolcano that is south of Sitting Bull Mountain, began forming in the mid-Pleistocene. Due to Glacier Peak's proximity to Sitting Bull Mountain, volcanic ash is quite common in the area.

Throughout the ice age, the North Cascades were mostly covered in thick glaciers, extending to near Puget Sound. Glaciation was most prevalent approximately 18,000 years ago, and most valleys were ice-free by 12,000 years ago. As a result, valleys in the area are deep and u-shaped, and mountains tend to be rocky, with steep slopes and narrow summits.

== Climate ==
Sitting Bull Mountain is located in the marine west coast climate zone of western North America. Most weather fronts originating in the Pacific Ocean travel northeast toward the Cascade Mountains. As fronts approach the North Cascades, they are forced upward by the peaks of the Cascade Range (orographic lift), causing them to drop their moisture in the form of rain or snowfall onto the Cascades. As a result, the west side of the North Cascades experiences high precipitation, especially during the winter months in the form of snowfall. Because of maritime influence, snow tends to be wet and heavy, resulting in high avalanche danger. During winter months, weather is usually cloudy, but due to high pressure systems over the Pacific Ocean that intensify during summer months, there is often little or no cloud cover during the summer. Due to its temperate climate and proximity to the Pacific Ocean, areas west of the Cascade Crest very rarely experience temperatures below 0 °F (−18 °C) or above 80 °F (27 °C). The months of July through September offer the most favorable weather for viewing or climbing this peak.

== Gallery ==
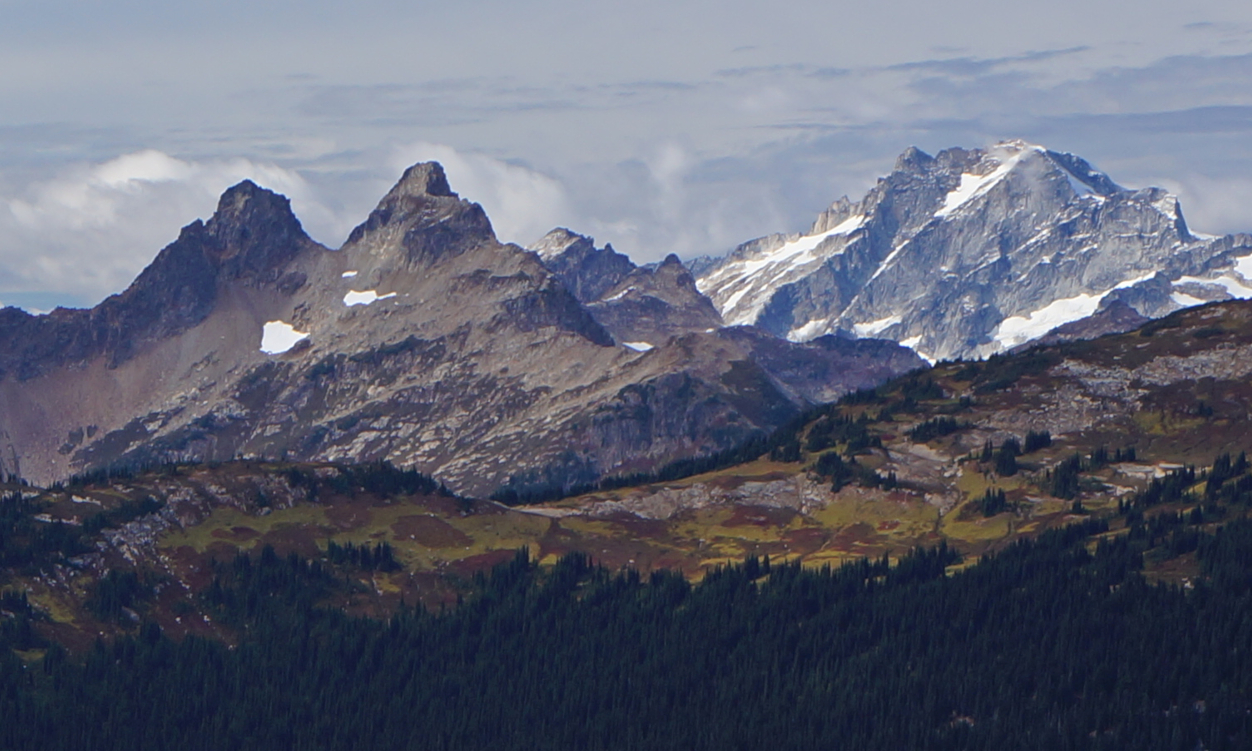
Sitting Bull Mountain and Dome Peak seen from Spider Gap

== See also ==
- Geography of the North Cascades
- Geology of the Pacific Northwest
- Glacier Peak Wilderness
