= Gunsight Peak =

Mountain in Washington (state), United States

- Northwest aspect centered at top

Highest point
- Elevation: 8,198 ft (2,499 m)
- Prominence: 518 ft (158 m)
- Coordinates: 48°18′24″N 120°59′38″W

Geography
- Location within Washington (state) Location within the United States
- Location: Chelan County, Washington, U.S.
- Parent range: Cascade Range
- Topo map: USGS Agnes Mountain

Climbing
- Easiest route: class 5

Gunsight Peak (8,198 feet (2,499 m)) is in Wenatchee National Forest in the U.S. state of Washington. On the east slopes of Gunsight Peak lies Blue Glacier while to the west lies the larger Chickamin Glacier. The tallest of a series of peaks along Blue Mountain, Gunsight Peak is a challenging climb and ropes are recommended.
