= Spire Glacier =

Glacier in the state of Washington

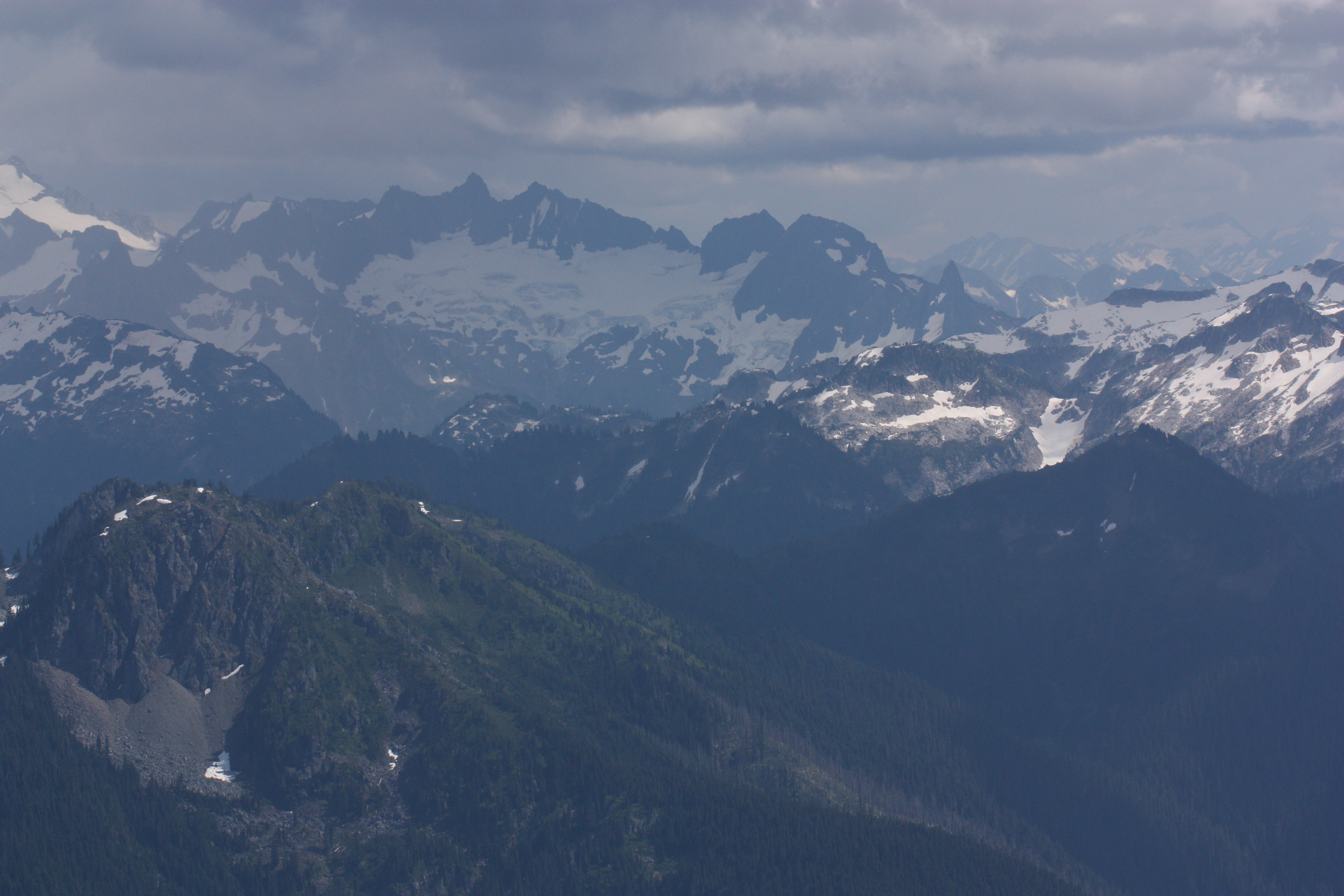
- Spire Point (left center) with Spire Glacier below

- Location within Washington (state)
- Type: Alpine glacier
- Location: Skagit County, Washington, U.S.
- Coordinates: 48°19′15″N 121°04′48″W
- Length: .50 mi (0.80 km)
- Terminus: Icefall/Barren rock
- Status: Retreating

Spire Glacier is in Snoqualmie National Forest in the U.S. state of Washington and is on the west slopes of Spire Point. Spire Glacier flows generally northwest for a distance of approximately .50 mi (0.80 km). An arête separates the glacier from Dana Glacier to the east. Spire Glacier descends from nearly 7,400 to 6,000 ft (2,300 to 1,800 m).

== See also ==
- List of glaciers in the United States
