= Bannock =

Bannock may mean:

- Bannock (British and Irish food), a kind of bread, cooked on a stone or griddle served mainly in Scotland but consumed throughout the British Isles
- Bannock (Indigenous American food), various types of bread, usually prepared by pan-frying also known as a native delicacy
- Bannock people, a Native American people of what is now southeastern Oregon and western Idaho
- Bannock County, Idaho
- Bannock Mountain, a summit in Washington state, US
- Bannock, Ohio
- Bannock Pass, between Idaho and Montana
- Russell Bannock (1919–2020), Canadian World War II flying ace and test pilot

== See also ==
- Bannack, Montana, town named after the tribe, today a ghost town
