= Dome Glacier =

Glacier in the state of Washington

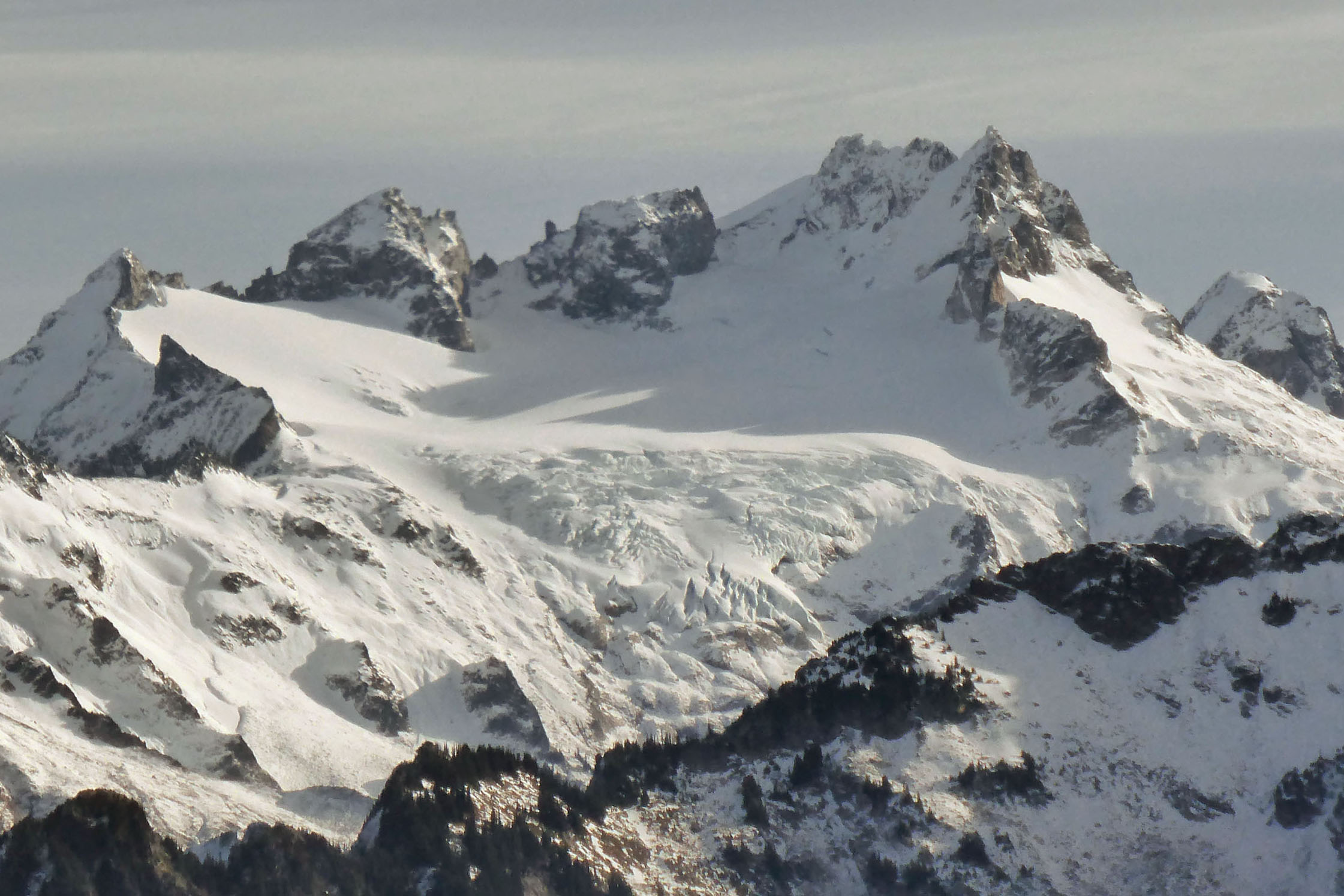
- Dome Glacier (center)

- Location within Washington (state)
- Type: Alpine glacier
- Location: Skagit County, Washington, U.S.
- Coordinates: 48°18′20″N 121°02′20″W
- Length: .80 mi (1.29 km)
- Terminus: Icefall/Barren rock
- Status: Retreating

Dome Glacier is in Snoqualmie National Forest in the U.S. state of Washington and is on the north slopes of Dome Peak. Dome Glacier flows generally west for a distance of approximately .80 mi (1.29 km), maintaining a generally shallow gradient between 8,600 to 7,600 ft (2,600 to 2,300 m) at which point it descends in a large icefall to approximately 6,900 ft (2,100 m). An arête separates the glacier from Dana Glacier to the northwest and Chickamin Glacier to the east.

== See also ==
- List of glaciers in the United States
