= Bannock Mountain =

Mountain in Washington, United States

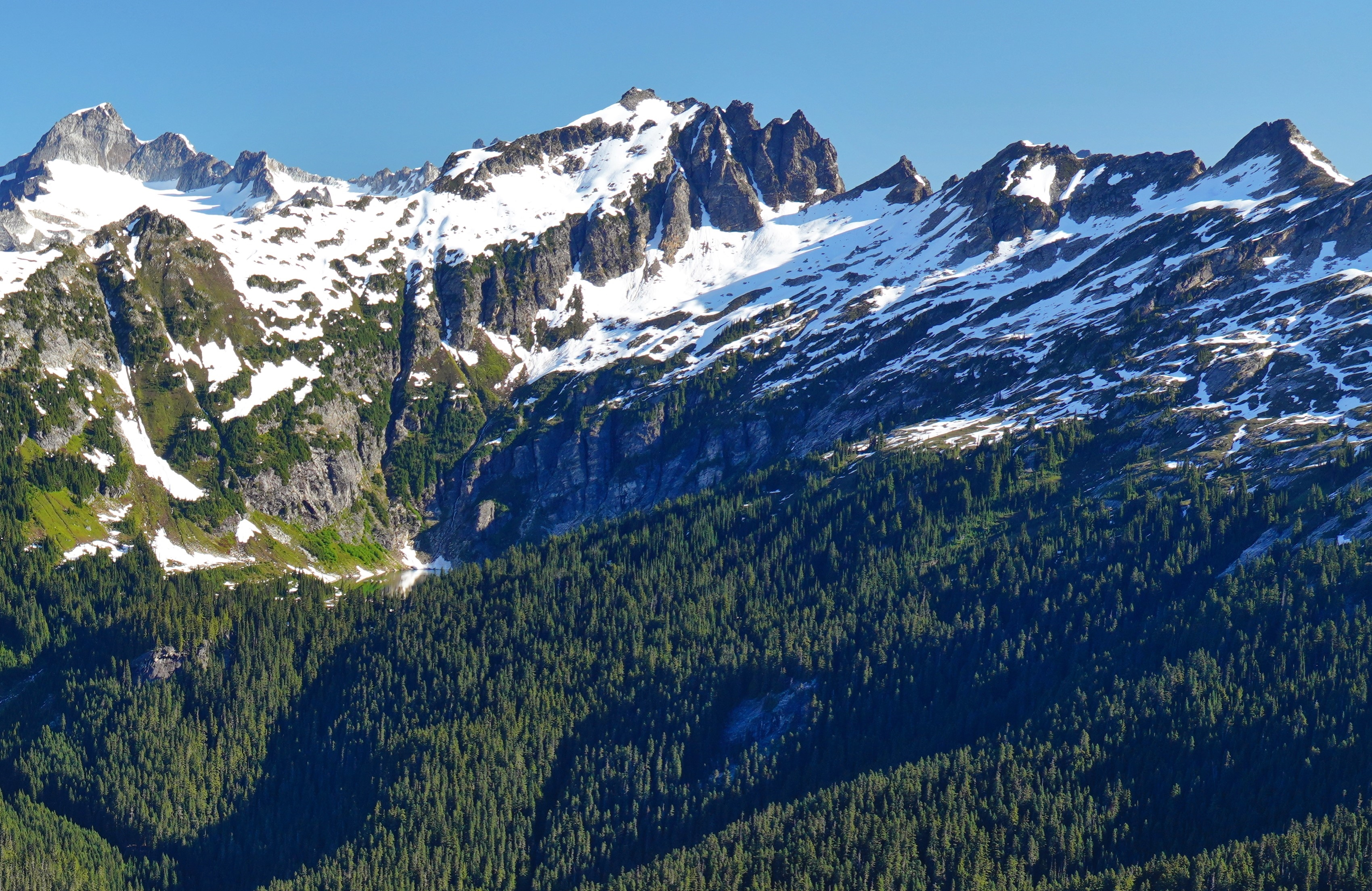
- South aspect, viewed from Miners Ridge

Highest point
- Elevation: 7,769 ft (2,368 m)
- Prominence: 640 ft (195 m)
- Parent peak: Plummer Mountain (7,870 ft)
- Isolation: 2.98 mi (4.80 km)
- Coordinates: 48°15′21″N 120°59′31″W

Naming
- Etymology: Bannock

Geography
- Location within Washington (state) Location within the United States
- Interactive map of Bannock Mountain
- Country: United States
- State: Washington
- County: Snohomish / Chelan
- Protected area: Glacier Peak Wilderness
- Parent range: Cascade Range; North Cascades
- Topo map: USGS Agnes Mountain

Geology
- Rock age: Cretaceous
- Rock type: Metamorphic Gneiss

Climbing
- First ascent: 1936

Bannock Mountain is a 7,769-foot (2,368-metre) summit in the North Cascades of Washington state.

== Description ==
Bannock Mountain is located 28 miles (45 km) east of Darrington, Washington, in the heart of the Glacier Peak Wilderness, on land managed by Mount Baker–Snoqualmie National Forest and Okanogan–Wenatchee National Forest. The mountain is situated on the crest of the Cascade Range, along the common border shared by Snohomish County and Chelan County. Precipitation runoff from the mountain's east slope drains to the Stehekin River via Agnes Creek, whereas the west slope drains into Sulphur Creek and the south slope into Canyon Creek, which are both tributaries of the Suiattle River. Topographic relief is significant as the summit rises 3,770 feet (1,149 meters) above Sulphur Creek in 1.5 miles (2.4 km) and 2,370 feet (722 meters) above Bannock Lakes in one-half mile (0.8 km). The first ascent of the summit was made on July 28, 1936, by Hermann Ulrichs, Art Johnson, and Dwight Watson. The mountain's toponym has been officially adopted by the United States Board on Geographic Names, and refers to bannock, which is a variety of flatbread or quick bread that early surveyors prepared over campfires.

== Geology ==
Subduction and tectonic activity in the area began during the late cretaceous period, about 90 million years ago. The area was previously an oceanic environment, consisting mainly of sedimentary and volcanic rocks. Extensive volcanic activity began to take place in the oligocene, about 35 million years ago. However, mountain building in the area did not begin until the miocene, approximately 10 million years ago. Bannock Mountain is located in the Cloudy Pass batholith, an intrusive formation that was formed approximately 20 million years ago, during the early miocene. Glacier Peak, a stratovolcano that is 11 mi (18 km) south of Bannock Mountain, began forming in the mid-Pleistocene. Due to Glacier Peak's proximity to Bannock Mountain, volcanic ash is quite common in the area.

Throughout the ice age, the North Cascades were mostly covered in thick glaciers, extending to near Puget Sound. Glaciation was most prevalent approximately 18,000 years ago, and most valleys were ice-free by 12,000 years ago. As a result, valleys in the area are deep and u-shaped, and mountains tend to be rocky, with steep slopes and narrow summits.

== Climate ==
Bannock Mountain is located in the marine west coast climate zone of western North America. Most weather fronts originating in the Pacific Ocean travel northeast toward the Cascade Mountains. As fronts approach the North Cascades, they are forced upward by the peaks (orographic lift), causing them to drop their moisture in the form of rain or snowfall onto the Cascades. As a result, the west side of the North Cascades experiences high precipitation, especially during the winter months in the form of snowfall. Because of maritime influence, snow tends to be wet and heavy, resulting in high avalanche danger. During winter months weather is usually cloudy, but due to high pressure systems over the Pacific Ocean that intensify during summer months, there is often little or no cloud cover during the summer. Due to its temperate climate and proximity to the Pacific Ocean, areas west of the Cascade Crest very rarely experience temperatures below 0 °F (−18 °C) or above 80 °F (27 °C). The months of July through September offer the most favorable weather for viewing or climbing this peak.

== See also ==
- Geography of the North Cascades
- Geology of the Pacific Northwest
