= Cloudy Peak (North Cascades) =

Mountain in Washington (state), United States

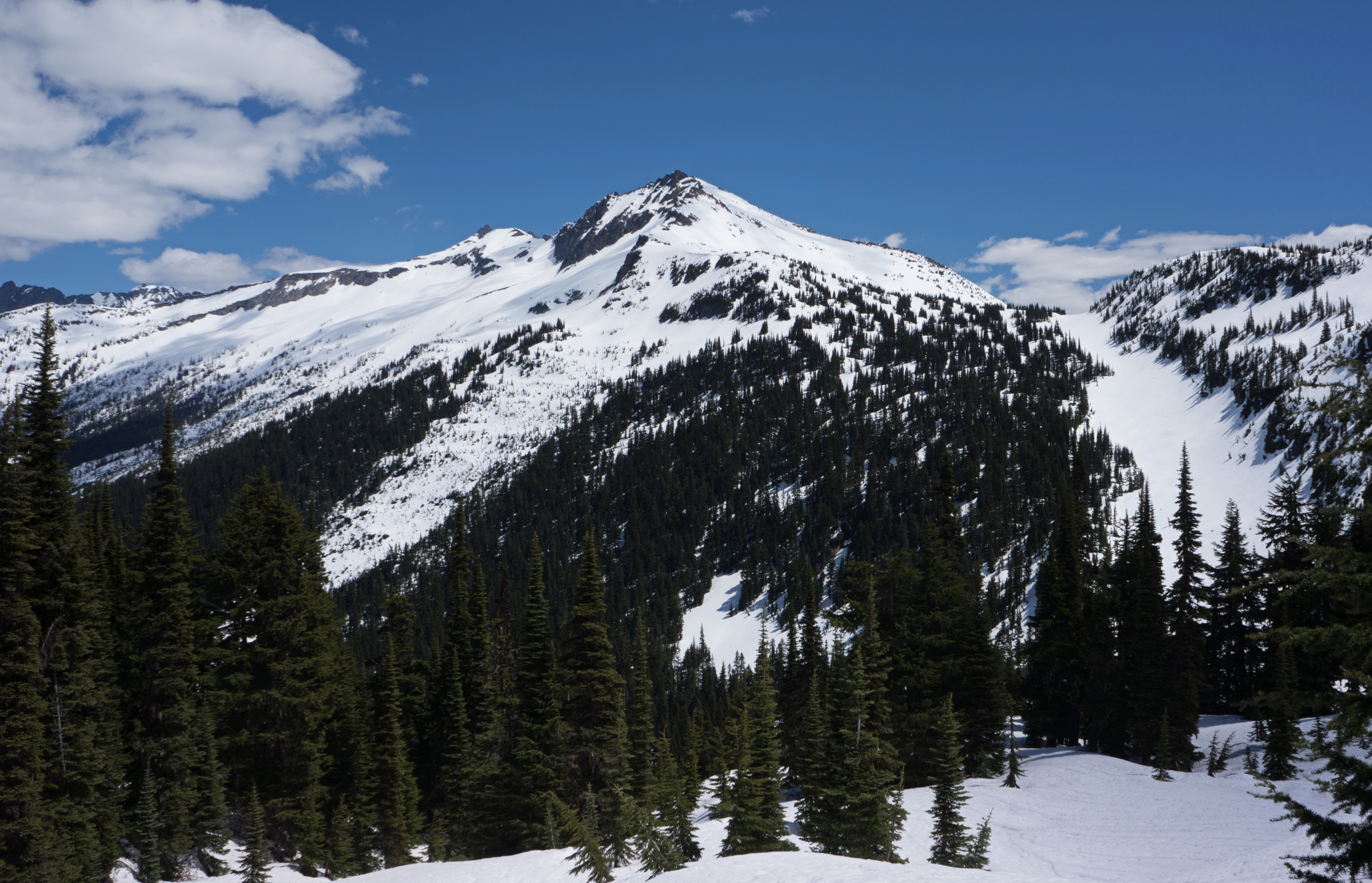
- Cloudy Peak seen from Suiattle Pass

Highest point
- Elevation: 7,915 ft (2,412 m)
- Prominence: 195 ft (59 m)
- Parent peak: North Star Mountain 8,096 ft
- Coordinates: 48°12′43″N 120°54′42″W

Geography
- Location within Washington (state) Location within the United States
- Interactive map of Cloudy Peak
- Location: Chelan County, Washington, U.S.
- Parent range: North Cascades; Cascade Range
- Topo map: USGS Suiattle Pass

Geology
- Rock age: Cretaceous

Climbing
- First ascent: 1921, party of The Mountaineers
- Easiest route: Scrambling

Cloudy Peak is a 7,915-foot (2,412-metre) mountain summit located in the Glacier Peak Wilderness of the North Cascades, in Chelan County of Washington state. Its nearest higher peak is North Star Mountain, 0.67 mi (1.08 km) to the northeast. Precipitation runoff from Cloudy Peak drains into Agnes Creek and Railroad Creek, both tributaries of the Chelan River.

== Geology ==
Cloudy Peak is located in the Cloudy Pass batholith, an intrusive formation that was formed approximately 20 million years ago, during the early Miocene. The history of the formation of the Cascade Mountains dates back millions of years ago to the late Eocene Epoch. With the North American Plate overriding the Pacific Plate, episodes of volcanic igneous activity persisted. In addition, small fragments of the oceanic and continental lithosphere called terranes created the North Cascades about 50 million years ago.

During the Pleistocene period dating back over two million years ago, glaciation advancing and retreating repeatedly scoured and shaped the landscape. Glaciation was most prevalent approximately 18,000 years ago, and most valleys were ice-free by 12,000 years ago. Uplift and faulting in combination with glaciation have been the dominant processes which have created the tall peaks and deep valleys of the North Cascades area. Subduction and tectonic activity in the area began during the late cretaceous period, about 90 million years ago. Extensive volcanic activity began to take place in the oligocene, about 35 million years ago. Glacier Peak, a stratovolcano that is southwest of Cloudy Peak, began forming in the mid-Pleistocene.

== Climate ==
Cloudy Peak is located in the marine west coast climate zone of western North America. Most weather fronts originate in the Pacific Ocean, and travel northeast toward the Cascade Mountains. As fronts approach the North Cascades, they are forced upward by the peaks of the Cascade Range, causing them to drop their moisture in the form of rain or snowfall onto the Cascades (Orographic lift). As a result, the west side of the North Cascades experiences high precipitation, especially during the winter months in the form of snowfall. Because of maritime influence, snow tends to be wet and heavy, resulting in high avalanche danger. During winter months, weather is usually cloudy, but, due to high pressure systems over the Pacific Ocean that intensify during summer months, there is often little or no cloud cover during the summer.

== Gallery ==
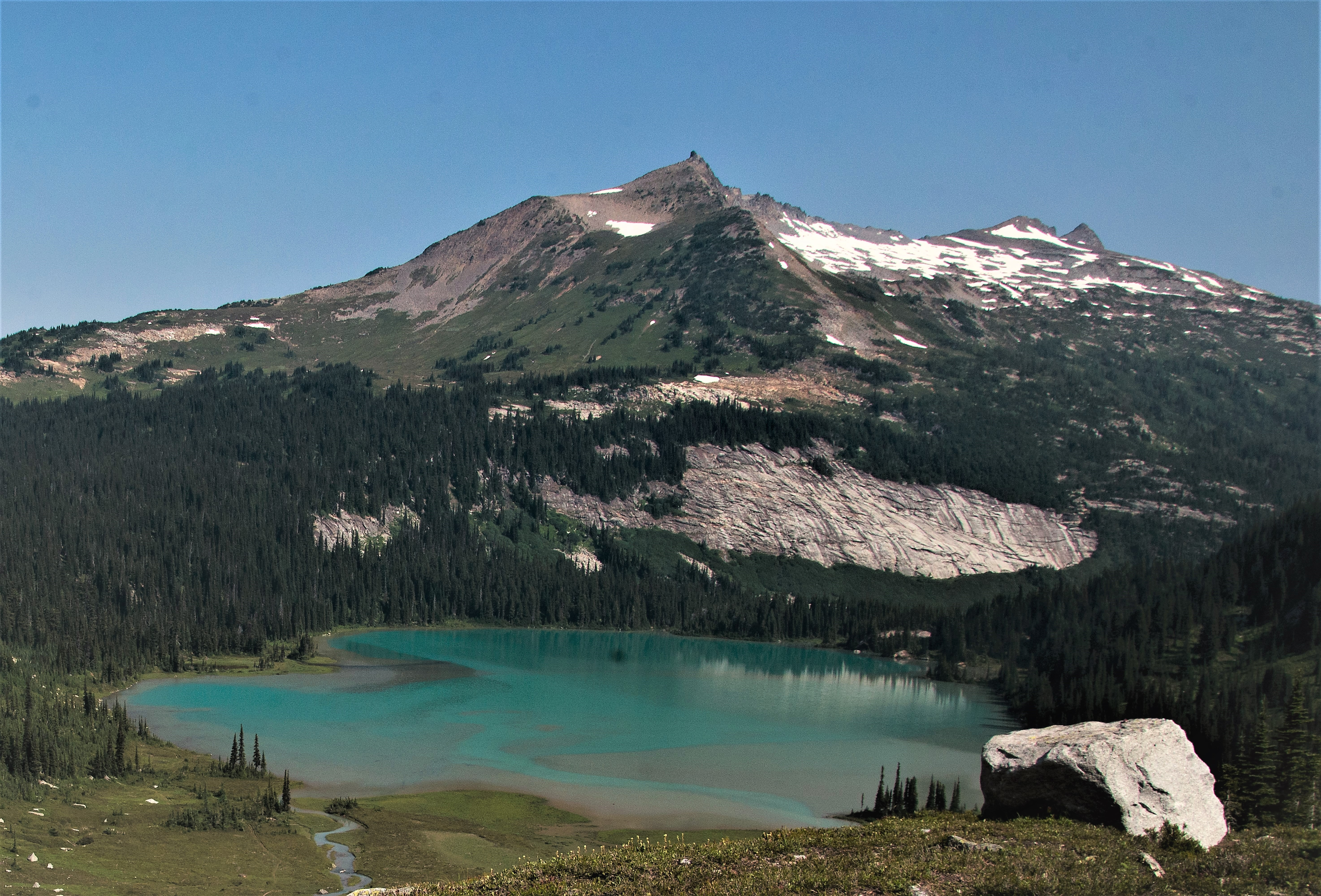
South aspect of Cloudy Peak, Lyman Lake

== See also ==
- List of mountain peaks of Washington (state)
