= Spire Point =

Mountain in Washington (state), United States

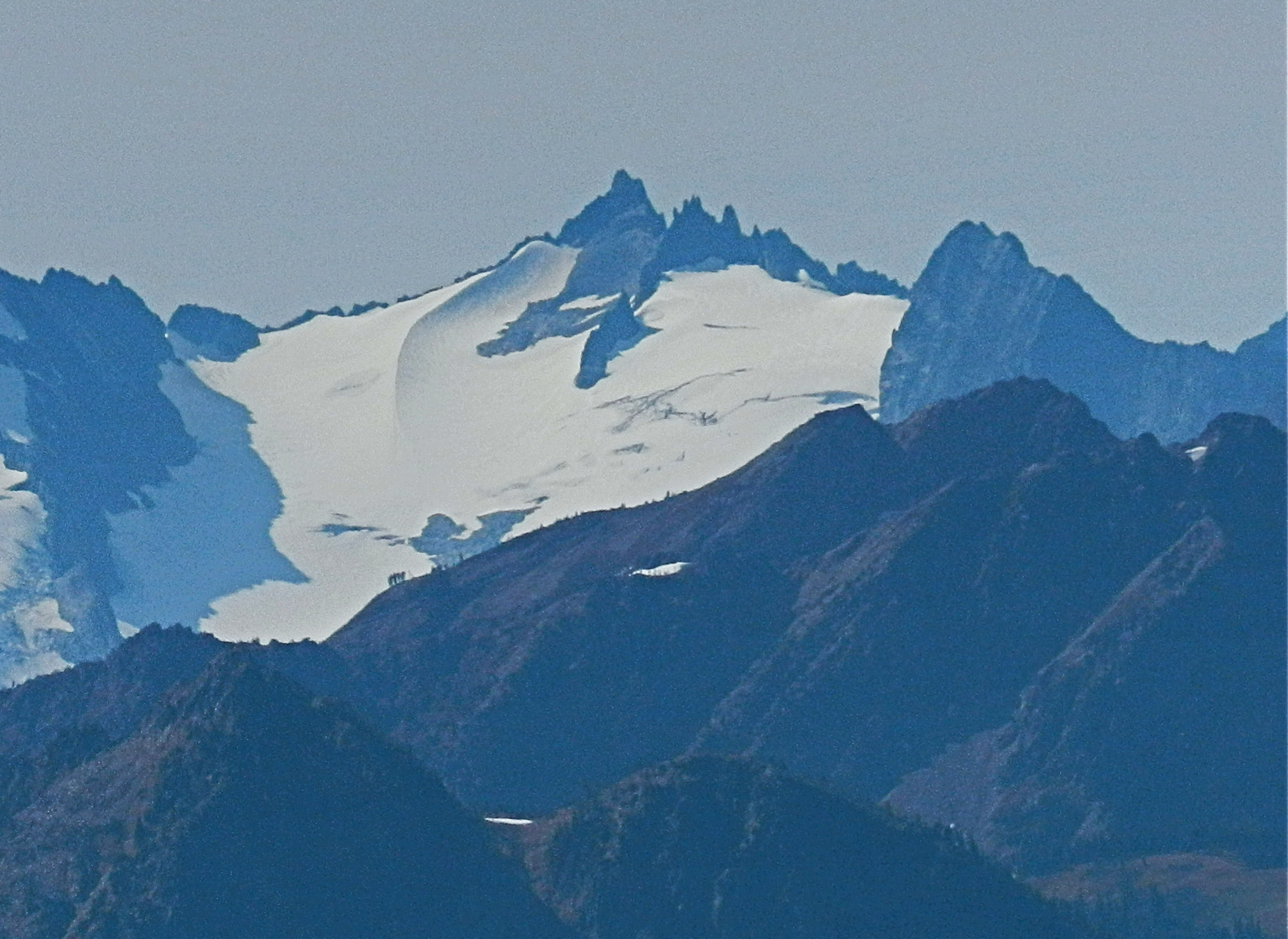
- Spire Point seen from Maple Pass

Highest point
- Elevation: 8,264 ft (2,519 m)
- Prominence: 784 ft (239 m)
- Coordinates: 48°19′03″N 121°04′16″W

Geography
- Location within Washington (state) Location within the United States
- Location: Chelan and Skagit County, Washington, U.S.
- Parent range: Cascade Range
- Topo map: USGS Dome Peak

Climbing
- Easiest route: class 5

Spire Point (8,264 feet; 2,519 m) is in Mount Baker-Snoqualmie and Wenatchee National Forests in the U.S. state of Washington. On the northwest slope of Spire Point lies Spire Glacier while Dana Glacier is to the east. Ascending Spire Point is a technical climb.

== Climate ==
Spire Point is located in the marine west coast climate zone of western North America. Most weather fronts originate in the Pacific Ocean, and travel northeast toward the Cascade Mountains. As fronts approach the North Cascades, they are forced upward by the peaks of the Cascade Range, causing them to drop their moisture in the form of rain or snowfall onto the Cascades (Orographic lift). As a result, the west side of the North Cascades experiences high precipitation, especially during the winter months in the form of snowfall. During winter months, weather is usually cloudy, but, due to high pressure systems over the Pacific Ocean that intensify during summer months, there is often little or no cloud cover during the summer.

== Geology ==
The North Cascades feature some of the most rugged topography in the Cascade Range with craggy peaks, spires, ridges, and deep glacial valleys. The history of the formation of the Cascade Mountains dates back millions of years ago to the late Eocene Epoch. During the Pleistocene period dating back over two million years ago, glaciation advancing and retreating repeatedly scoured and shaped the landscape. The U-shaped cross section of the river valleys is a result of recent glaciation. Uplift and faulting in combination with glaciation have been the dominant processes which have created the tall peaks and deep valleys of the North Cascades area.

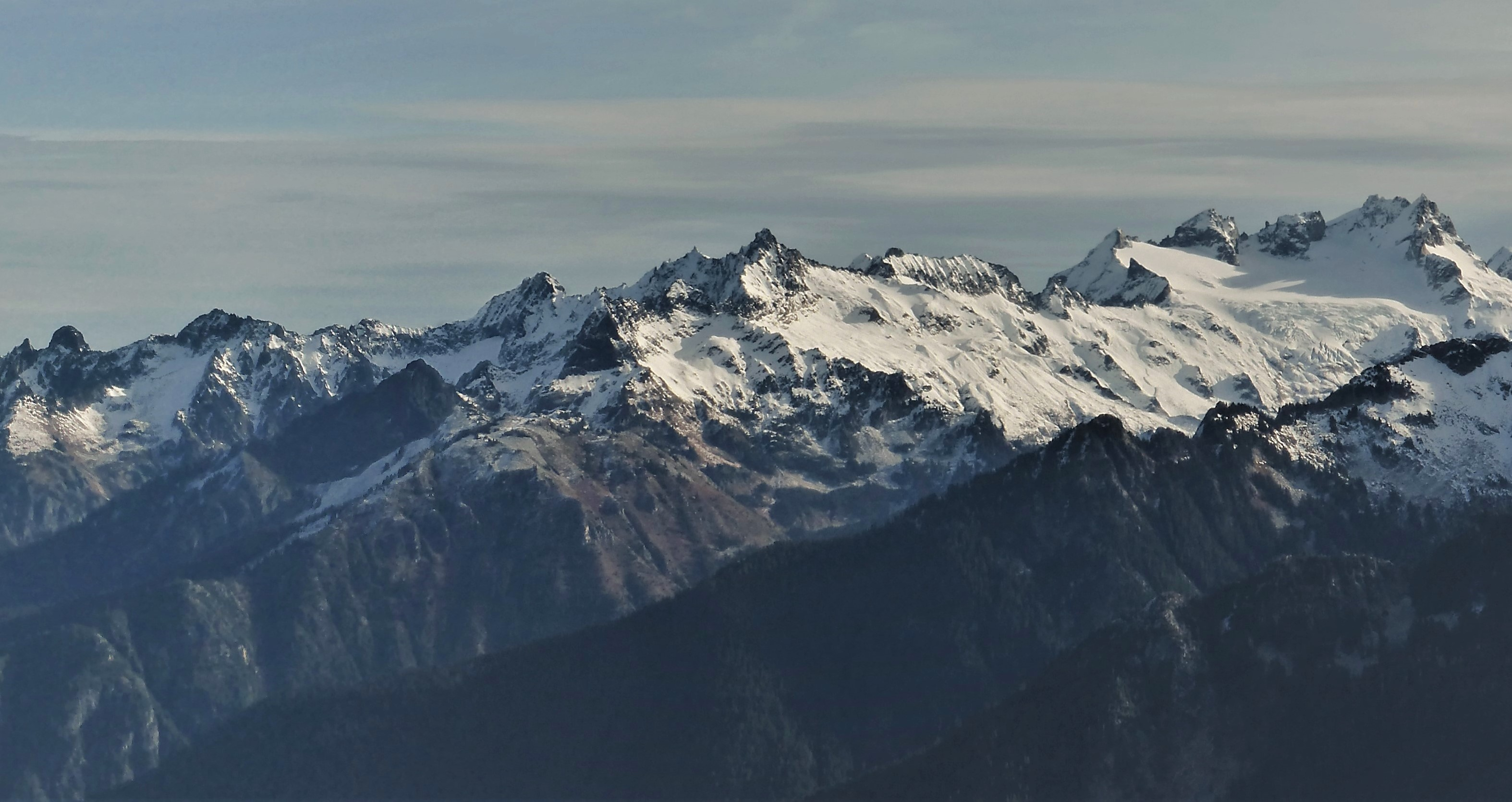
Spire Point (center), Dome Peak (right) seen from Green Mountain
