= Grant Glacier (Washington) =

Glacier in Washington, United States

- Location within Washington (state)
- Type: Mountain glacier
- Location: Chelan County, Washington, U.S.
- Coordinates: 48°13′34″N 120°53′51″W
- Length: .25 mi (0.40 km)
- Terminus: Barren rock/icefall
- Status: Retreating

Grant Glacier is in Wenatchee National Forest in the U.S. state of Washington, in a cirque to the north of North Star Mountain. Grant Glacier descends from 7,800 to 7,000 ft (2,400 to 2,100 m).

== See also ==
- List of glaciers in the United States
