= Dome Peak =

Mountain

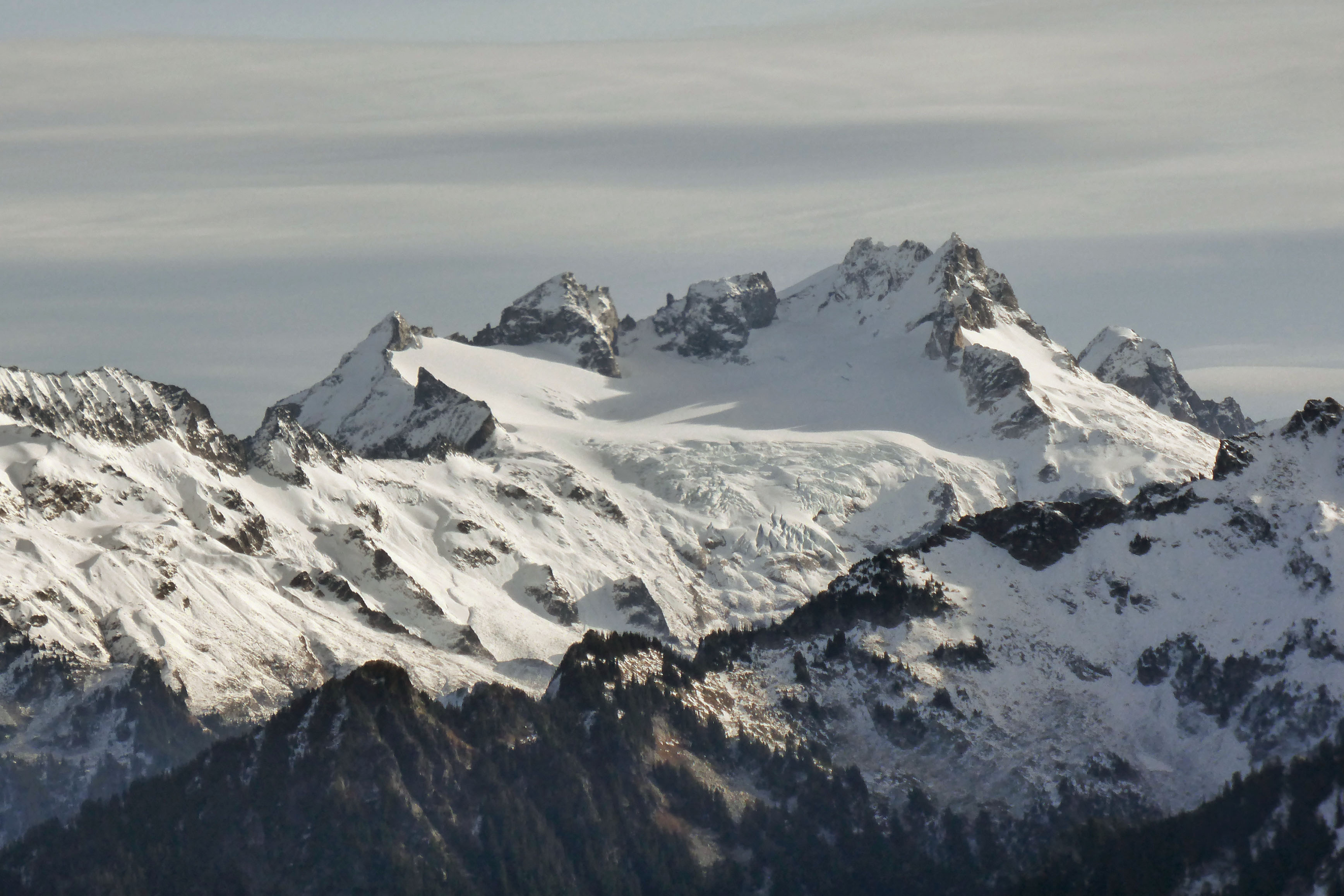

Highest point
- Elevation: 8,920+ ft (2,720+ m)
- Prominence: 3,040 ft (930 m)
- Coordinates: 48°18′12.3″N 121°01′46.2″W

Geography
- Location: Skagit County, Washington, U.S.
- Parent range: Cascade Range, North Cascades
- Topo map: USGS Dome Peak

Climbing
- First ascent: August 1, 1936 by George Freed and Eric Larson

Dome Peak is a high, massive, glaciated mountain in the Glacier Peak Wilderness of Washington's North Cascades. The remote location of Dome Peak, combined with its height, make it a less common destination for Cascade Range mountaineers. Dome Peak is at the southern end of the Ptarmigan Traverse mountaineering route. It is located at the extreme southeast corner of Skagit County. The mountain was given its name by Albert H. Sylvester, the first forest supervisor of Wenatchee National Forest.

There are two main summits connected by a narrow ridge with the northeastern summit being higher than the southwestern. Chickamin Glacier is north of the peak while Dome Glacier is to the west. A rock face drops off to the southeast. Dana Glacier is on the north side of a ridge that connects Dome Peak and Spire Point.

The higher northeast peak was first climbed by George Freed and Eric Larson on August 1, 1936. The southwest peak was first climbed on July 5, 1936, by Forest Farr, Norval Grigg, and Don Blair.

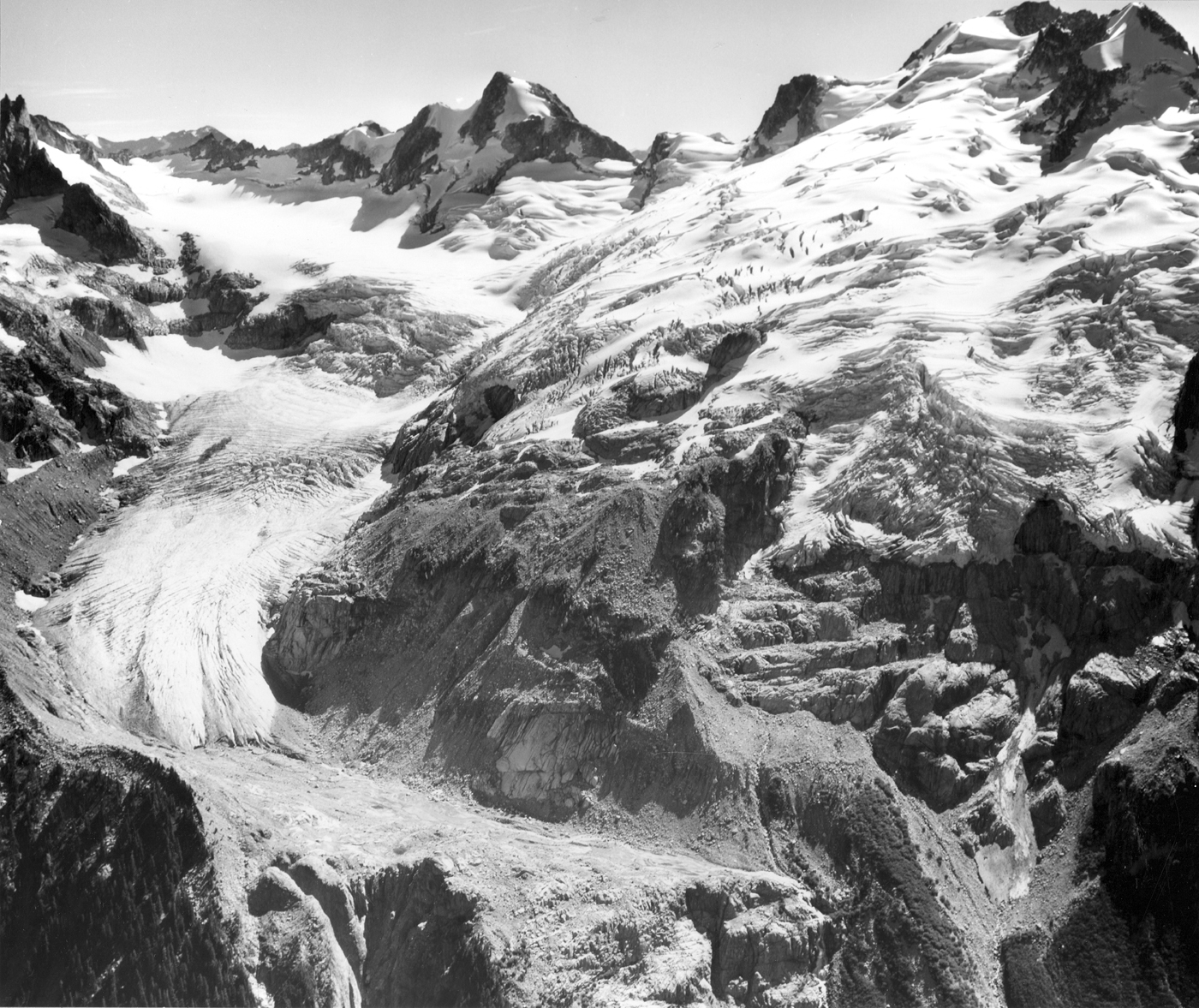
Chickamin Glacier, east face of Dome Peak (1965)
