= Dana Glacier (Washington) =

Glacier in Wenatchee National Forest, Washington, United States

- Location within Washington (state)
- Type: Alpine glacier
- Location: Chelan County, Washington, U.S.
- Coordinates: 48°19′09″N 121°03′05″W
- Length: 1 mi (1.6 km)
- Terminus: Icefall/Barren rock
- Status: Retreating

Dana Glacier is in Wenatchee National Forest in the U.S. state of Washington and is .50 mi (0.80 km) west of Dome Peak. Dana Glacier flows generally north for a distance of approximately 1 mi (1.6 km). An arête divides the glacier in two while other aretes separate Dana Glacier from Chickamin and Dome Glaciers to the east and south respectively. Dana Glacier descends from nearly 8,000 to 6,000 ft (2,400 to 1,800 m).

== See also ==
- List of glaciers in the United States
