= Chickamin Glacier =

Glacier in the state of Washington

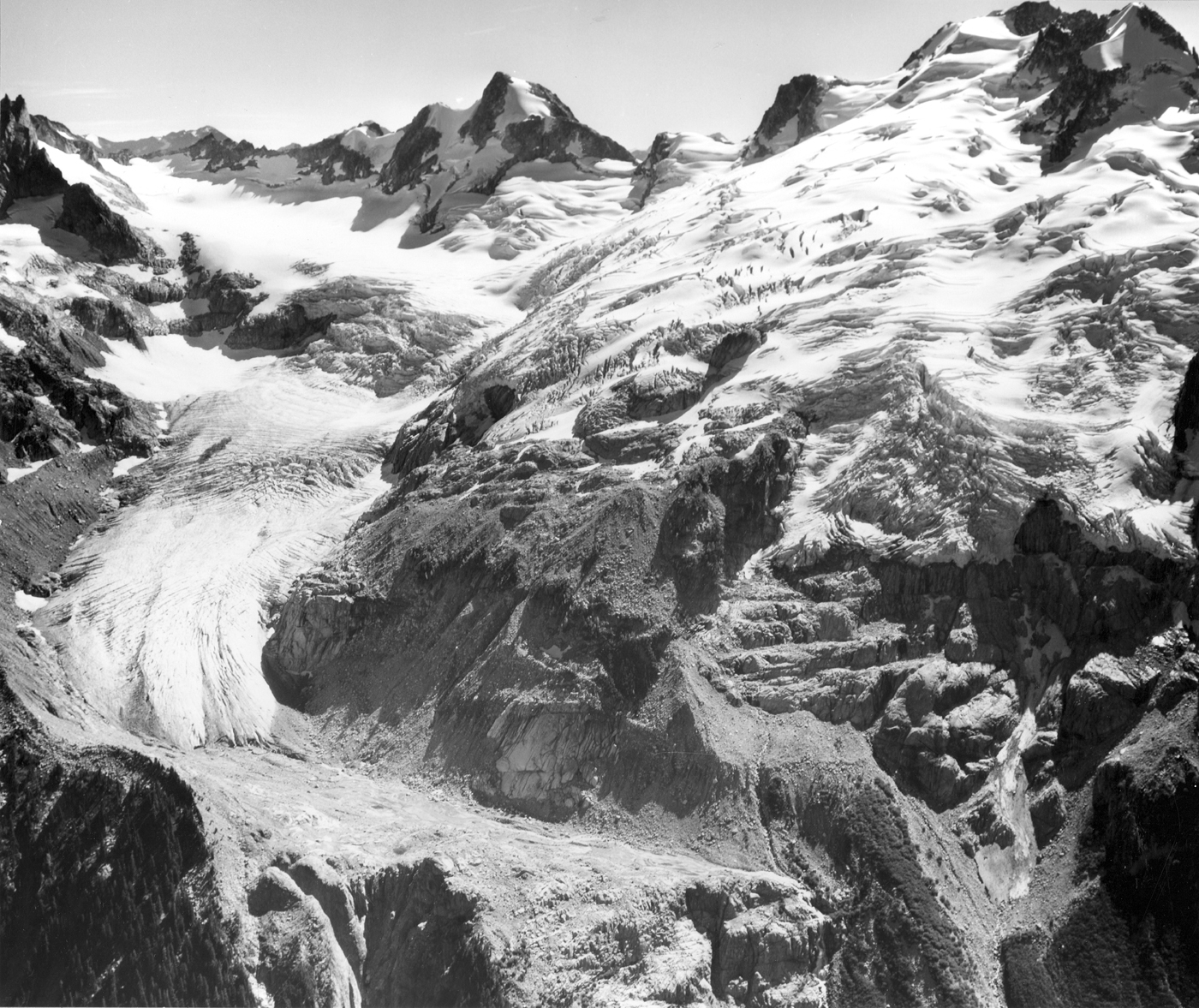
- Chickamin Glacier as it looked in 1965

- Location within Washington (state)
- Type: Alpine glacier
- Location: Chelan County, Washington, U.S.
- Coordinates: 48°18′39″N 121°01′09″W
- Length: 1.60 mi (2.57 km)
- Terminus: Icefall/Barren rock
- Status: Retreating

Chickamin Glacier is in the U.S. state of Washington. Chickamin Glacier is in Wenatchee National Forest and flows north from Dome Peak and Sinister Peak, descending from nearly 8,600 to 5,600 ft (2,600 to 1,700 m). Chickamin Glacier is separated from Dome Glacier to the south and Dana Glacier to the west by arêtes. The relatively narrow tongue of the 2-mile (3.2 km) wide glacier retreated 800 ft (240 m) between 1998 and 2006.

== See also ==
- List of glaciers in the United States
