= Plummer Mountain =

Mountain in Washington (state), United States

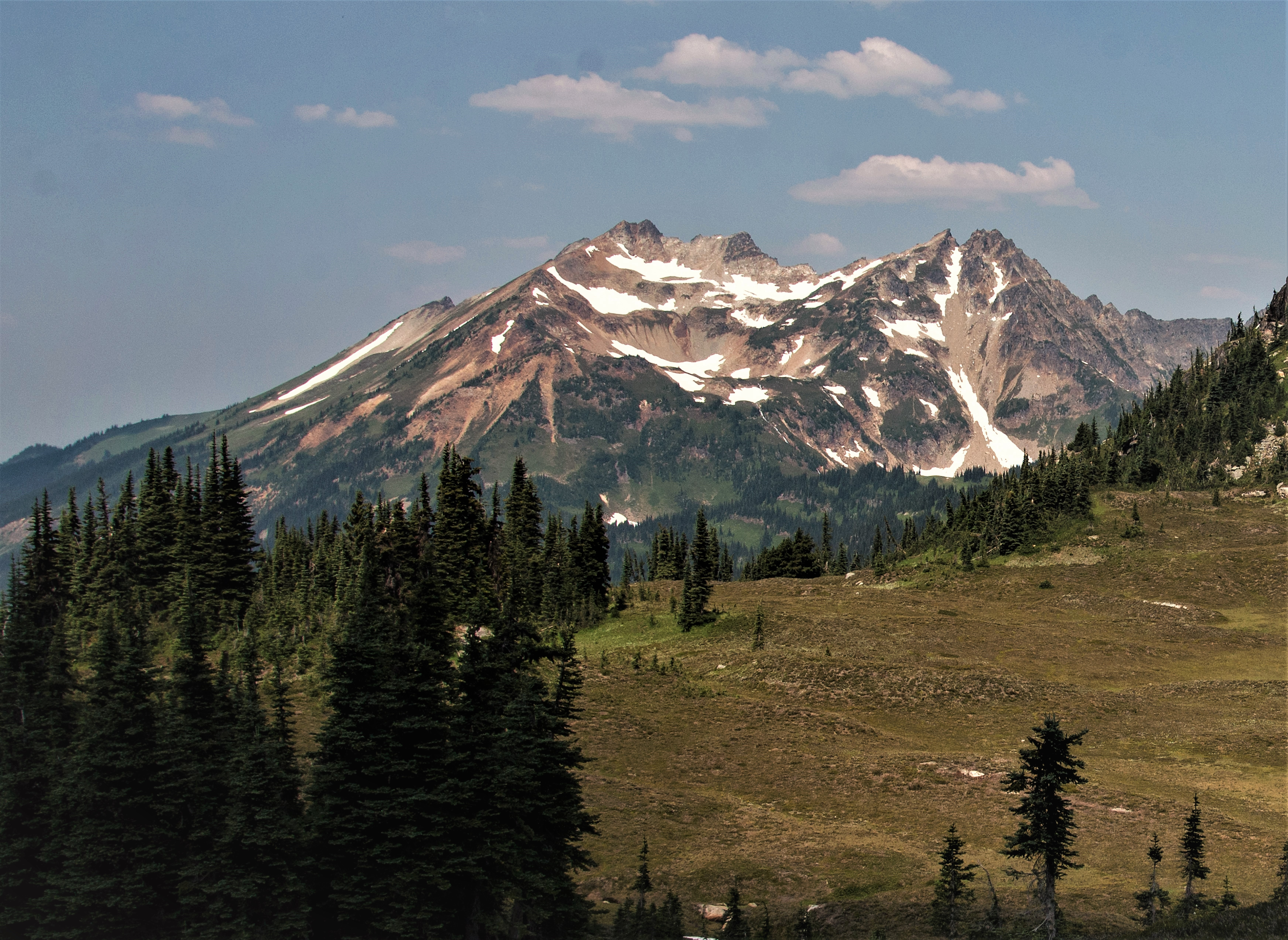
- East aspect

Highest point
- Elevation: 7,870 ft (2,399 m)
- Prominence: 1,950 ft (594 m)
- Parent peak: Chiwawa Mountain (8,459 ft)
- Isolation: 3.14 mi (5.05 km)
- Coordinates: 48°12′25″N 120°58′19″W

Geography
- Location within Washington (state) Location within the United States
- Interactive map of Plummer Mountain
- Country: United States
- State: Washington
- County: Snohomish
- Protected area: Glacier Peak Wilderness
- Parent range: Cascade Range; North Cascades
- Topo map: USGS Suiattle Pass

Geology
- Rock age: Cretaceous
- Mountain type: Metamorphic brown Gneiss

Climbing
- Easiest route: Scrambling

Plummer Mountain is a prominent summit of the North Cascades, in Snohomish County of Washington state. It is located west of Suiattle Pass in the heart of the Glacier Peak Wilderness on land managed by Mount Baker-Snoqualmie National Forest. Plummer Mountain is the high point and eastern culmination of Miners Ridge. Image Lake on Miners Ridge provides a campsite from which to climb Plummer. Kennecott Copper Corporation, as of 1988, planned to dig an open-pit copper mine on the slopes of Plummer Mountain. However, protests by various advocacy groups prevented the plan from developing further.

== Geology ==
Subduction and tectonic activity in the area began during the late cretaceous period, about 90 million years ago. The area was previously an oceanic environment, consisting mainly of sedimentary and volcanic rocks. Extensive volcanic activity began to take place in the oligocene, about 35 million years ago. However, mountain building in the area did not begin until the miocene, approximately 10 million years ago. Plummer Mountain is located in the Cloudy Pass batholith, an intrusive formation that was formed approximately 20 million years ago, during the early miocene. Glacier Peak, a stratovolcano that is south of Plummer Mountain, began forming in the mid-Pleistocene. Due to Glacier Peak's proximity to Plummer Mountain, volcanic ash is quite common in the area.

Throughout the ice age, the North Cascades were mostly covered in thick glaciers, extending to near Puget Sound. Glaciation was most prevalent approximately 18,000 years ago, and most valleys were ice-free by 12,000 years ago. As a result, valleys in the area are deep and U-shaped, and mountains tend to be rocky, with steep slopes and narrow summits.

== Climate ==
Plummer Mountain is located in the marine west coast climate zone of western North America. Most weather fronts originating in the Pacific Ocean travel northeast toward the Cascade Mountains. As fronts approach the North Cascades, they are forced upward by the peaks of the Cascade Range (orographic lift), causing them to drop their moisture in the form of rain or snowfall onto the Cascades. As a result, the west side of the North Cascades experiences high precipitation, especially during the winter months in the form of snowfall. Because of maritime influence, snow tends to be wet and heavy, resulting in high avalanche danger. During winter months, weather is usually cloudy, but due to high pressure systems over the Pacific Ocean that intensify during summer months, there is often little or no cloud cover during the summer. Due to its temperate climate and proximity to the Pacific Ocean, areas west of the Cascade Crest very rarely experience temperatures below 0 °F (−18 °C) or above 80 °F (27 °C).

== Hiking ==
The trail to Miners Ridge can be accessed from the Suiattle River Road. There is an alpine route with scrambling that leads from Miners Ridge to Plummer Mountain.

== Gallery ==
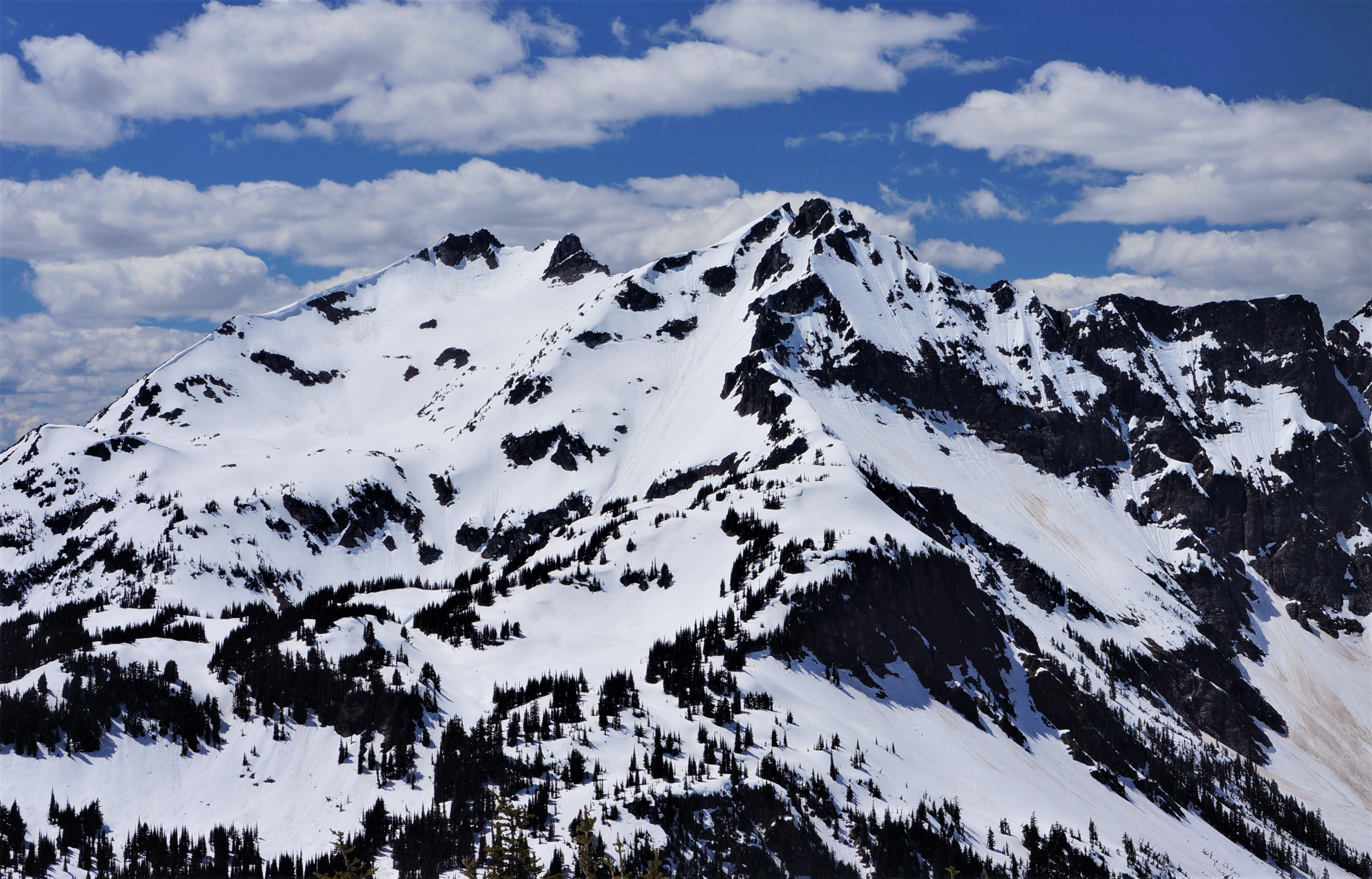
Plummer seen from Cloudy Pass

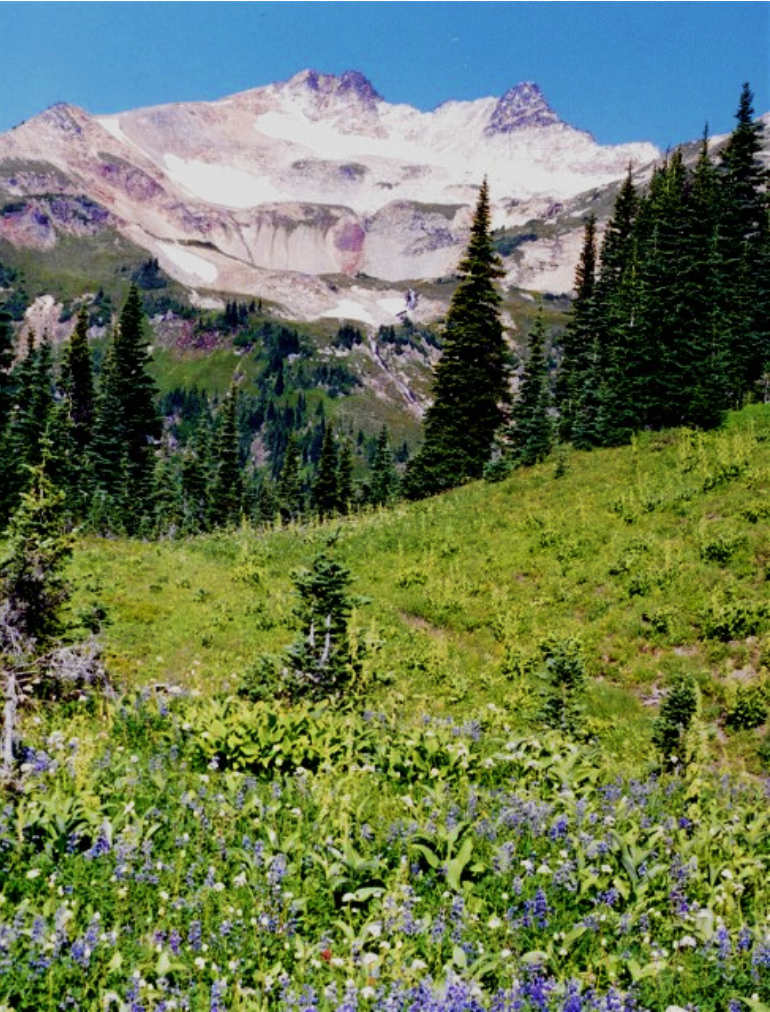
East aspect seen from Suiattle Pass

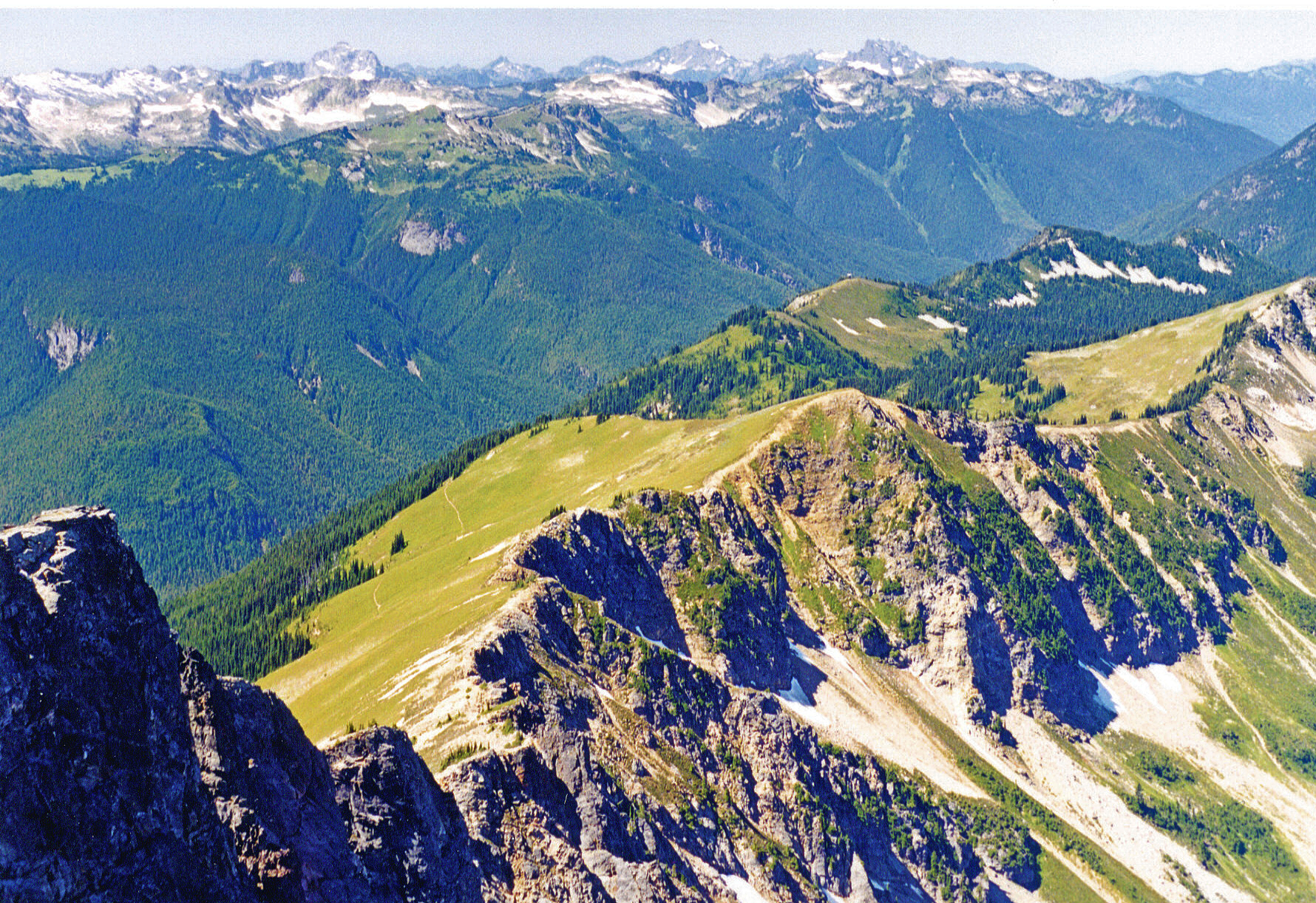
Miners Ridge below Plummer Mountain

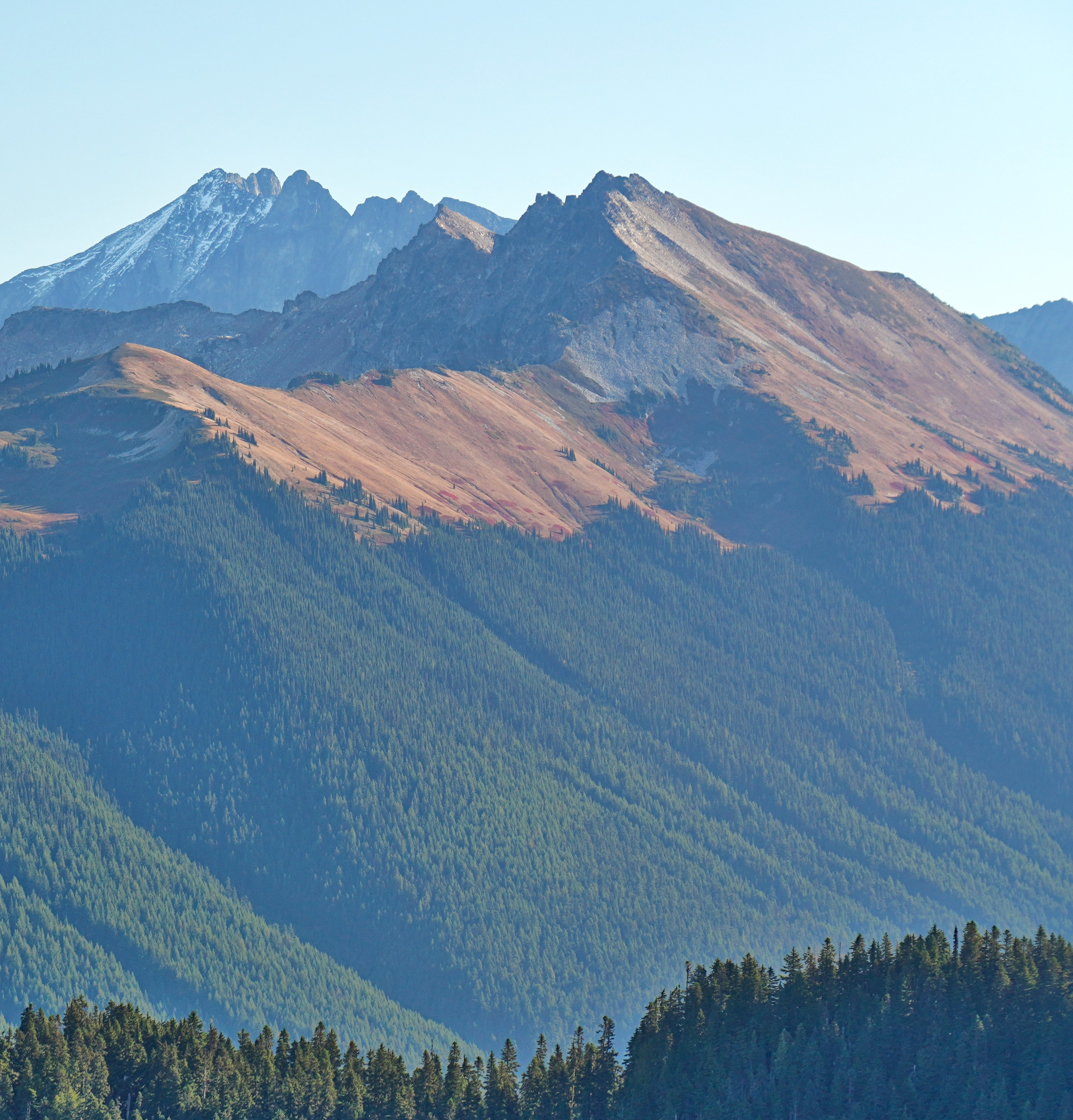
West aspect of Plummer Mountain (center) with Bonanza Peak (behind, left)

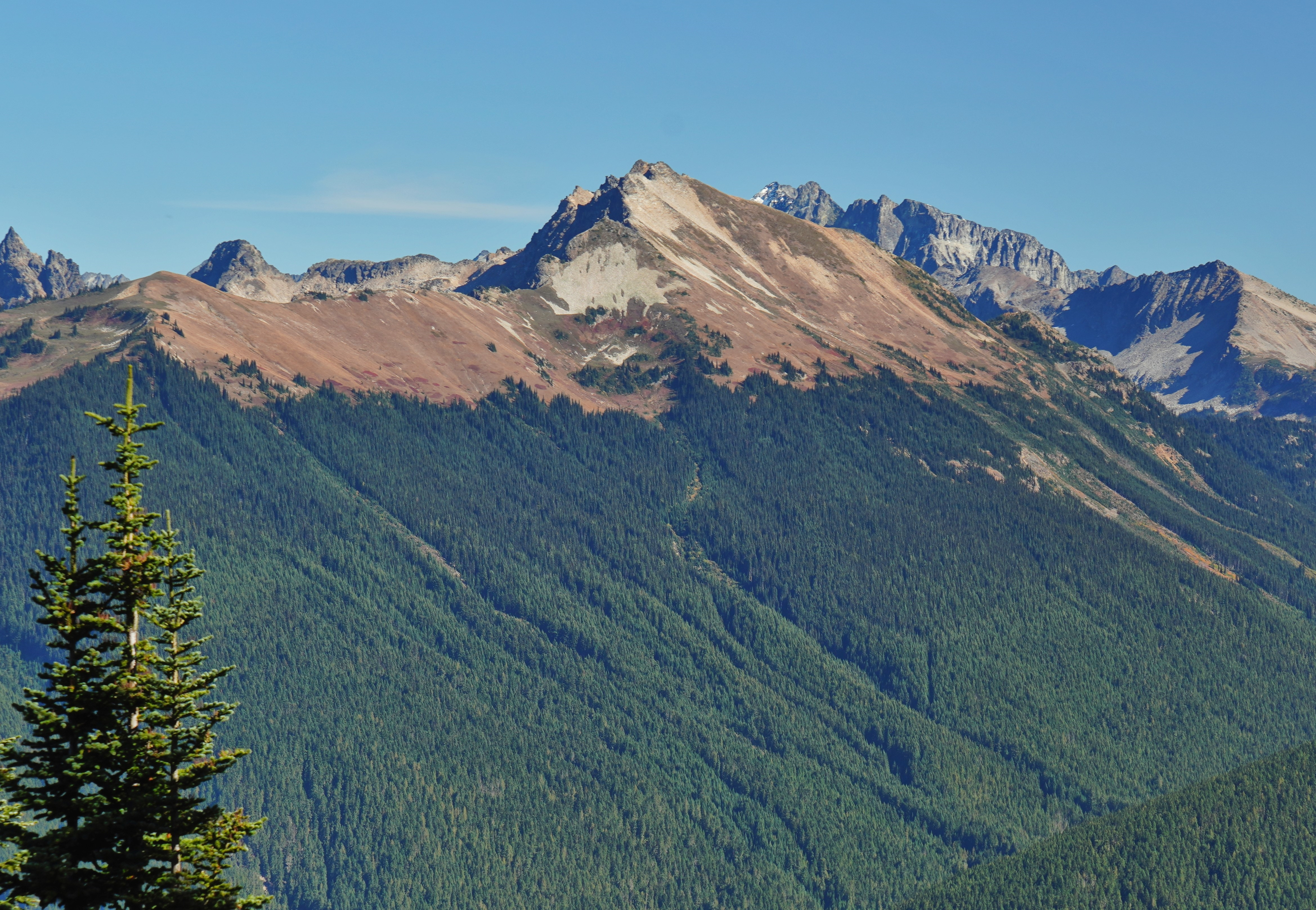
West aspect

== See also ==
- List of mountain peaks of Washington (state)
