= List of glaciers in Wyoming =

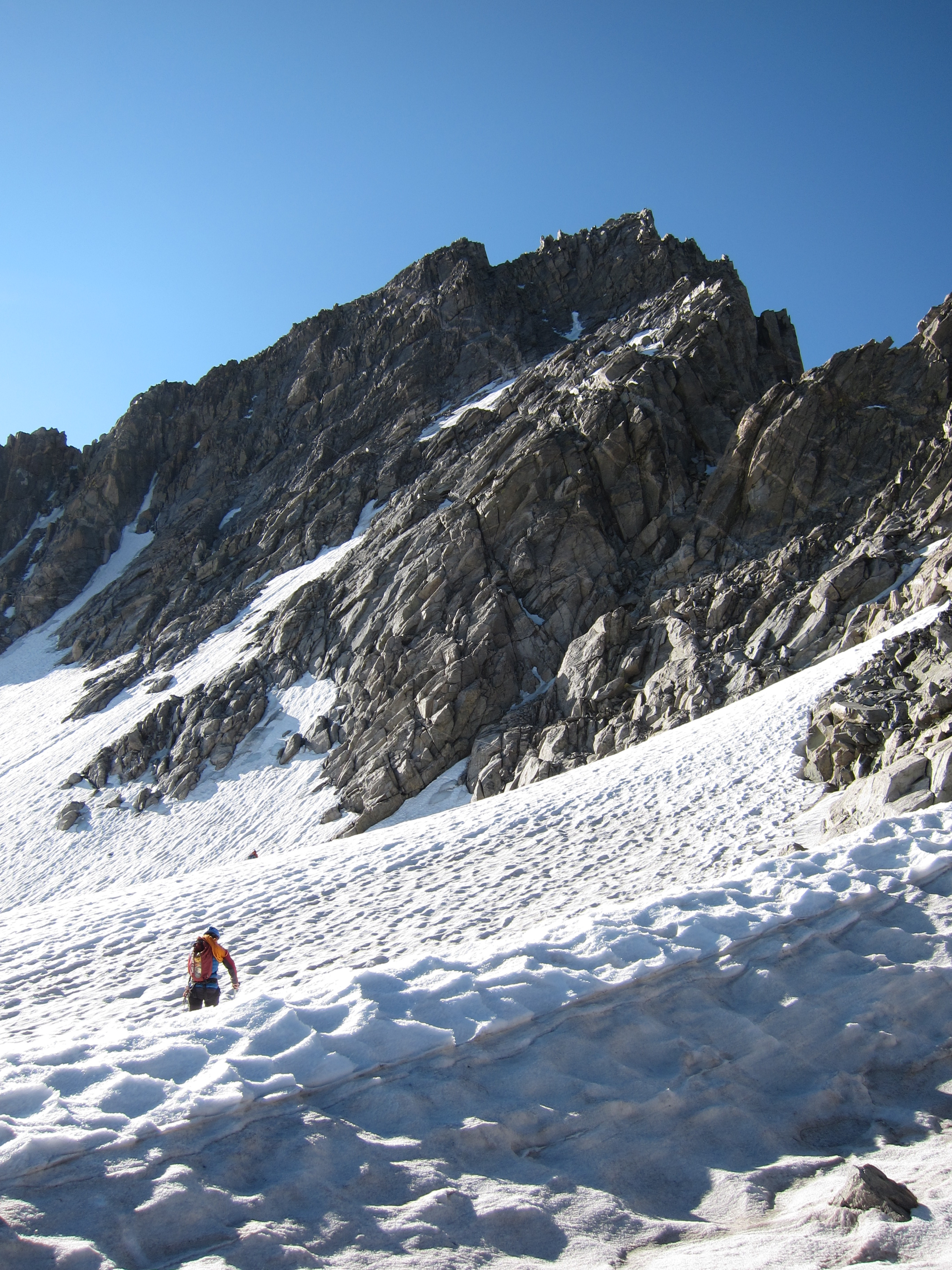
Sacagawea glacier, Fremont County, Wyoming

There are at least 37 named glaciers in Wyoming.

Wyoming /waɪˈoʊmɪŋ/ is a state in the mountain region of the Western United States. Wyoming is the 10th most extensive, but the least populous and the 2nd least densely populated of the 50 United States. The western two thirds of the state is covered mostly with the mountain ranges and rangelands in the foothills of the Eastern Rocky Mountains, while the eastern third of the state is high elevation prairie known as the High Plains.

- Baby Glacier, Sublette County, Wyoming, el. 11,696 feet (3,565 m)
- Bull Lake Glacier, Fremont County, Wyoming, el. 12,306 feet (3,751 m)
- Connie Glacier, Sublette County, Wyoming, el. 12,021 feet (3,664 m)
- Continental Glacier, Fremont County, Wyoming, el. 12,424 feet (3,787 m)
- Dinwoody Glacier, Fremont County, Wyoming, el. 11,585 feet (3,531 m)
- Downs Glacier, Fremont County, Wyoming, el. 11,995 feet (3,656 m)
- Dry Creek Glacier, Fremont County, Wyoming, el. 12,320 feet (3,760 m)
- DuNoir Glacier, Fremont County, Wyoming, el. 11,142 feet (3,396 m)
- East Torrey Glacier, Fremont County, Wyoming, el. 12,600 feet (3,800 m)
- Falling Ice Glacier, Teton County, Wyoming, el. 10,991 feet (3,350 m)
- Fishhawk Glacier, Park County, Wyoming, el. 10,646 feet (3,245 m)
- Gannett Glacier, Fremont County, Wyoming, el. 11,817 feet (3,602 m)
- Gooseneck Glacier, Fremont County, Wyoming, el. 12,375 feet (3,772 m)
- Grasshopper Glacier, Fremont County, Wyoming, el. 12,257 feet (3,736 m)
- Harrower Glacier, Sublette County, Wyoming, el. 12,014 feet (3,662 m)
- Heap Steep Glacier, Fremont County, Wyoming, el. 11,785 feet (3,592 m)
- Helen Glacier, Fremont County, Wyoming, el. 11,909 feet (3,630 m)
- Hooker Glacier, Fremont County, Wyoming, el. 11,197 feet (3,413 m)
- J Glacier, Sublette County, Wyoming, el. 11,876 feet (3,620 m)
- Klondike Glacier, Fremont County, Wyoming, el. 12,600 feet (3,800 m)
- Knife Point Glacier, Fremont County, Wyoming, el. 11,552 feet (3,521 m)
- Lander Glacier, Fremont County, Wyoming, el. 11,800 feet (3,600 m)
- Lizard Head Glacier, Fremont County, Wyoming, el. 12,000 feet (3,700 m)
- Lower Fremont Glacier, Fremont County, Wyoming, el. 12,090 feet (3,690 m)
- Mammoth Glacier, Sublette County, Wyoming, el. 11,886 feet (3,623 m)
- Middle Teton Glacier, Teton County, Wyoming, el. 10,869 feet (3,313 m)
- Minor Glacier, Sublette County, Wyoming, el. 12,047 feet (3,672 m)
- Petersen Glacier, Teton County, Wyoming, el. 9,813 feet (2,991 m)
- Sacagawea Glacier, Fremont County, Wyoming, el. 11,985 feet (3,653 m)
- Schoolroom Glacier, Teton County, Wyoming, el. 10,203 feet (3,110 m)
- Skillet Glacier, Teton County, Wyoming, el. 10,006 feet (3,050 m)
- Sourdough Glacier, Sublette County, Wyoming, el. 11,794 feet (3,595 m)
- Sphinx Glacier, Sublette County, Wyoming, el. 13,000 feet (4,000 m)
- Stroud Glacier, Sublette County, Wyoming, el. 11,663 feet (3,555 m)
- Teepe Glacier, Teton County, Wyoming, el. 11,480 feet (3,500 m)
- Teton Glacier, Teton County, Wyoming, el. 10,600 feet (3,200 m)
- Tiny Glacier, Sublette County, Wyoming, el. 11,591 feet (3,533 m)
- Triple Glaciers, Teton County, Wyoming, el. 10,518 feet (3,206 m)
- Twins Glacier, Sublette County, Wyoming, el. 11,539 feet (3,517 m)
- Upper Fremont Glacier, Fremont County, Wyoming, el. 13,028 feet (3,971 m)
- Washakie Glacier, Fremont County, Wyoming, el. 11,335 feet (3,455 m)
- Wind River Glacier, Fremont County, Wyoming, el. 12,600 feet (3,800 m)

== See also ==
- List of glaciers in the United States
- List of mountain ranges in Wyoming

== Notes ==
43°10′16″N 109°41′01″W 43°07′28″N 109°35′56″W 43°16′07″N 109°41′37″W 43°20′03″N 109°41′29″W 43°10′24″N 109°38′19″W 43°17′41″N 109°39′49″W 43°10′38″N 109°30′30″W 43°47′46″N 109°52′10″W 43°19′16″N 109°40′31″W 43°50′00″N 110°46′13″W 44°15′40″N 109°51′58″W 43°11′45″N 109°38′44″W 43°10′55″N 109°38′54″W 43°14′12″N 109°39′55″W 43°06′02″N 109°35′18″W 43°10′30″N 109°37′03″W 43°09′21″N 109°37′01″W 42°51′24″N 109°18′40″W 43°14′17″N 109°41′56″W 43°13′26″N 109°39′59″W 43°06′41″N 109°34′39″W 42°52′02″N 109°19′45″W 42°47′34″N 109°12′23″W 43°07′56″N 109°35′49″W 43°10′05″N 109°39′59″W 43°43′57″N 110°48′15″W 43°11′12″N 109°39′45″W 43°46′45″N 110°50′54″W 43°08′37″N 109°36′42″W 43°43′33″N 110°50′56″W 43°50′14″N 110°45′50″W 43°14′48″N 109°41′15″W 43°09′56″N 109°38′53″W 43°08′50″N 109°40′46″W 43°44′11″N 110°47′55″W 43°44′30″N 110°47′32″W 43°03′13″N 109°33′56″W 43°50′17″N 110°47′04″W 43°08′59″N 109°39′15″W 43°07′52″N 109°36′58″W 42°48′31″N 109°14′47″W 42°42′31″N 109°07′41″W
