= Fremont Glacier =

Fremont Glacier may refer to:

- Fremont Glacier (Washington) in North Cascades National Park, Washington, USA
- Lower Fremont Glacier in the Wind River Range, Wyoming, USA
- Upper Fremont Glacier in the Wind River Range, Wyoming, USA
