= Spider Peak =

Mountain in the American state of Wyoming

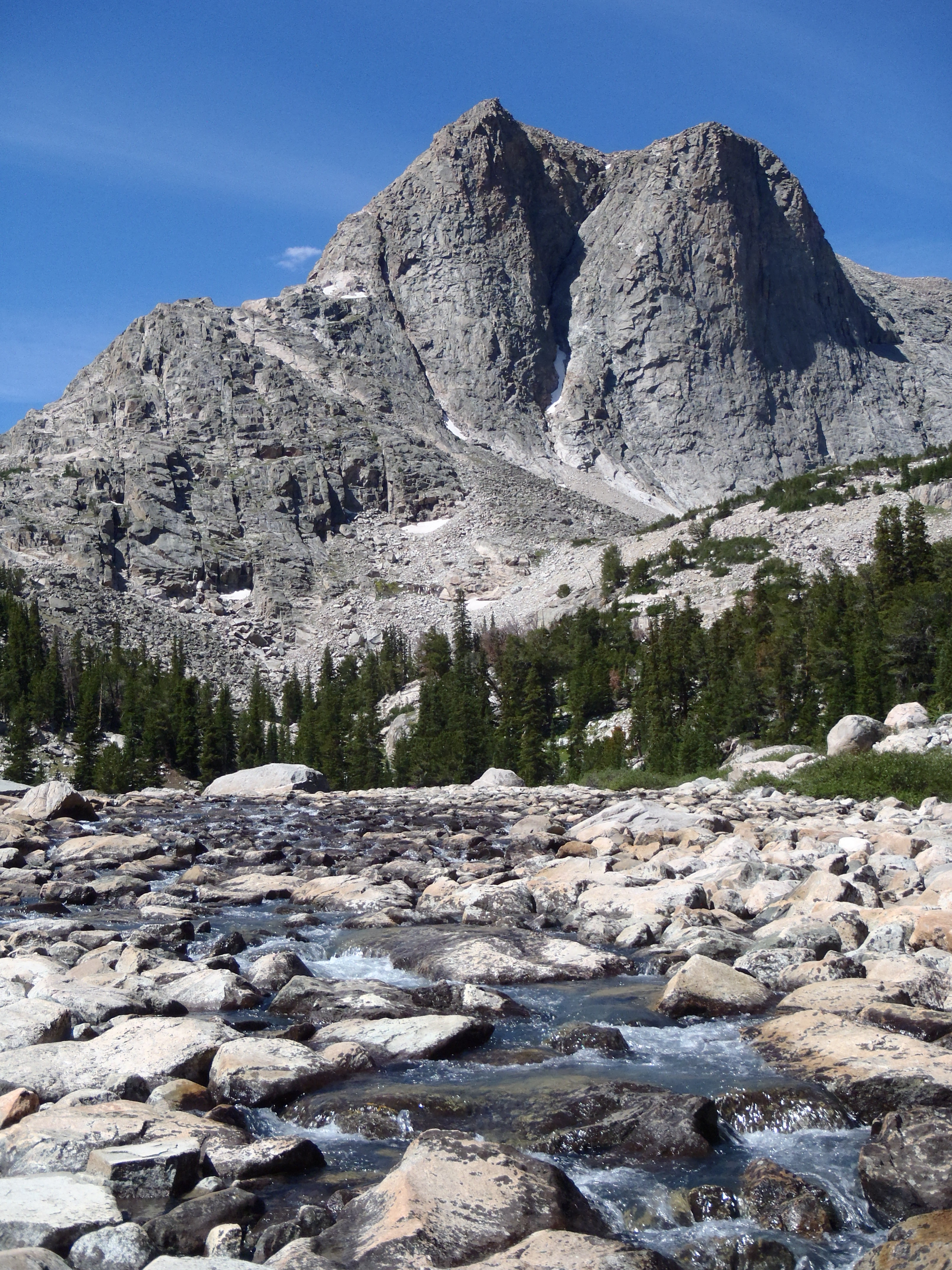
- Northeast aspect

Highest point
- Elevation: 12,234 ft (3,729 m)
- Prominence: 834 ft (254 m)
- Parent peak: Downs Mountain (13,355 ft)
- Isolation: 0.86 mi (1.38 km)
- Coordinates: 43°19′27″N 109°39′10″W

Geography
- Location within Wyoming Location within the United States
- Location: Fremont County, Wyoming, U.S.
- Parent range: Wind River Range
- Topo map: USGS Temple Peak

Geology
- Rock type: granitic

Climbing
- First ascent: July 18, 1960
- Easiest route: class 3 North ridge

Spider Peak is a 12,234-foot-elevation (3,729-meter) mountain summit located in Fremont County of Wyoming, United States.

== Geography ==
The peak is situated 1.5 mile east of the Continental Divide in the northern portion of the remote Wind River Range. It is set in the Fitzpatrick Wilderness, on land managed by Shoshone National Forest. Neighbors include Downs Mountain, 1.4 mile to the southwest, and Torrey Peak 2.4 miles to the northeast. Topographic relief is significant as the east aspect rises 1,700 feet (520 meters) above Turquoise Lake in one-half mile. Precipitation runoff from the mountain drains into Torrey Creek, which is a tributary of the Wind River.

== Climate ==
According to the Köppen climate classification system, Spider Peak is located in an alpine subarctic climate zone with long, cold, snowy winters, and cool to warm summers. Due to its altitude, it receives precipitation all year, as snow in winter, and as thunderstorms in summer. This climate supports the nearby Continental Glacier and East Torrey Glacier.

== Climbing ==
Established climbing routes:

- North Ridge – first ascent 1960 – Dave Dornan, Maurice Horn
- East Buttress – (II 5.7) – 1964 – Fred Beckey, Jerry Fuller, Alex Bertulis
- Southwest Ridge – class 5.5 – 1972 – Vince Lee, Dennis Pierce, Terry Sawyer, Tom Wolff
- Southeast Face – (II 5.6) – 1975 – Tom Warren and party
- Northeast Buttress – (III 5.8) – 1975 – Fred Beckey, Steve Jackson, Brian Leo
- Northeast Face – (IV 5.9) – 1978 – Randy Cerf, Herbie Ogden, George Schunk

The 1960 first ascent party named the peak based on the numerous hairy, dark-brown spiders they encountered here.

== Hazards ==
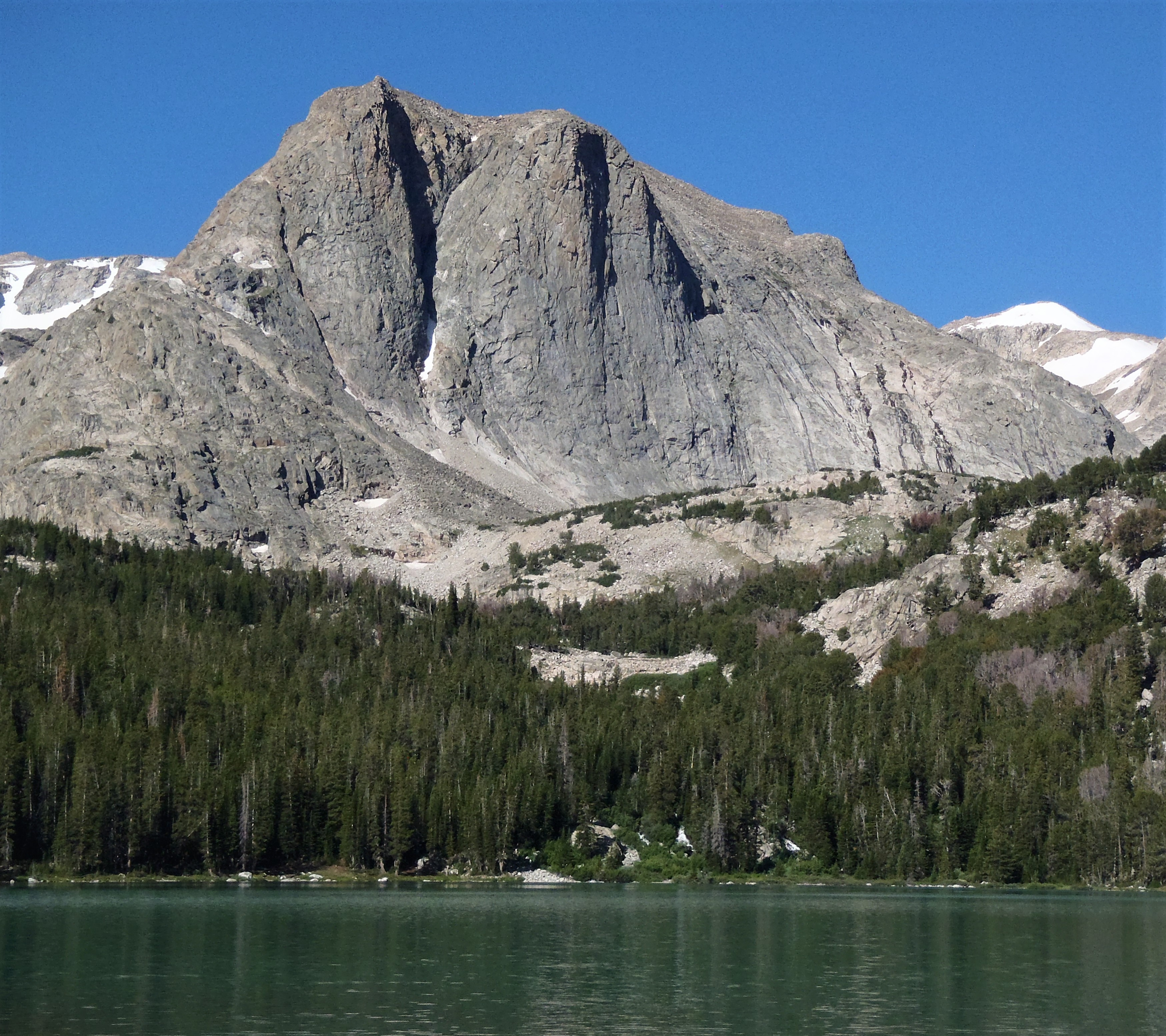
Spider Peak seen from Bomber Lake

Encountering bears is a concern in the Wind River Range. There are other concerns as well, including bugs, wildfires, adverse snow conditions and nighttime cold temperatures.

Importantly, there have been notable incidents, including accidental deaths, due to falls from steep cliffs (a misstep could be fatal in this class 4/5 terrain) and due to falling rocks, over the years, including 1993, 2007 (involving an experienced NOLS leader), 2015 and 2018. A 54-year-old climber from Durango fell 400–800 feet to his death from Steeple Peak in 2017. Other incidents include a seriously injured backpacker being airlifted near Squaretop Mountain in 2005, and a fatal hiker incident (from an apparent accidental fall) in 2006 that involved state search and rescue. The U.S. Forest Service does not offer updated aggregated records on the official number of fatalities in the Wind River Range.

== See also ==
- List of mountain peaks of Wyoming
