= The Sphinx (Wyoming) =

American mountain

- Location within Wyoming Location within the United States

Highest point
- Elevation: 13,264 ft (4,043 m)
- Prominence: 298 ft (91 m)
- Coordinates: 43°09′56″N 109°38′53″W

Geography
- Location: Fremont / Sublette counties, Wyoming, U.S.
- Parent range: Wind River Range
- Topo map: USGS Gannett Peak

Geology
- Mountain type: Batholith

Climbing
- First ascent: 1929 (Kenneth Henderson and Robert Underhill)

The Sphinx is a 13,264-foot (4,043 m) mountain in the Wind River Range in the U.S. state of Wyoming. The summit is on the Continental Divide in both Shoshone and Bridger-Teton National Forests and it is .38 mi (0.61 km) east-southeast of Mount Woodrow Wilson. The Dinwoody Glacier flows from the north slopes of the peak, while Sphinx Glacier is on the southwest flank of the mountain.

== Hazards ==
Encountering bears is a concern in the Wind River Range. There are other concerns as well, including bugs, wildfires, adverse snow conditions and nighttime cold temperatures.

Importantly, there have been notable incidents, including accidental deaths, due to falls from steep cliffs (a misstep could be fatal in this class 4/5 terrain) and due to falling rocks, over the years, including 1993, 2007 (involving an experienced NOLS leader), 2015 and 2018. Other incidents include a seriously injured backpacker being airlifted near SquareTop Mountain in 2005, and a fatal hiker incident (from an apparent accidental fall) in 2006 that involved state search and rescue. The U.S. Forest Service does not offer updated aggregated records on the official number of fatalities in the Wind River Range.
