= Bastion Peak-Northeast Peak =

Mountain peak in Wyoming

- Location within Wyoming Location within the United States

Highest point
- Elevation: 13,476 ft (4,107 m)
- Prominence: 190 ft (58 m)
- Coordinates: 43°12′31″N 109°39′38″W

Geography
- Location: Fremont County, Wyoming, U.S.
- Parent range: Wind River Range
- Topo map: USGS Gannett Peak

Bastion Peak-Northeast Peak 13,476 ft (4,107 m) is located in the Wind River Range in the U.S. state of Wyoming. The peak is one of the highest in Wyoming, and is connected to its taller neighbor Bastion Peak by an arête to the southwest. An unnamed glacier lies below the precipitous east flank of the mountain, while Gannett Glacier is to the south.

== Hazards ==
Encountering bears is a concern in the Wind River Range. There are other concerns as well, including bugs, wildfires, adverse snow conditions and nighttime cold temperatures.

Importantly, there have been notable incidents, including accidental deaths, due to falls from steep cliffs (a misstep could be fatal in this class 4/5 terrain) and due to falling rocks, over the years, including 1993, 2007 (involving an experienced NOLS leader), 2015 and 2018. Other incidents include a seriously injured backpacker being airlifted near SquareTop Mountain in 2005, and a fatal hiker incident (from an apparent accidental fall) in 2006 that involved state search and rescue. The U.S. Forest Service does not offer updated aggregated records on the official number of fatalities in the Wind River Range.
