= Torrey Peak =

Torrey Peak is the name of the following American mountains:

- Torrey Peak (Wyoming)
- Torrey Peak (Texas)

== See also ==
- Torreys Peak, Colorado, United States
- Torrey Mountain, Montana, United States - see List of mountains in Beaverhead County, Montana
