= Douglas Glacier =

Douglas Glacier may mean:

- Douglas Glacier (Antarctica)
- Douglas Glacier (Washington), in North Cascades National Park, Washington, USA
- Douglas Glacier (Westland), in the Southern Alps of New Zealand
- Douglas Glacier (Canterbury), in the Arrowsmith Range of New Zealand
