= Mount Koven =

Mount Koven could mean:

- Mount Koven (Alaska), a peak of the Alaska Range northeast of Mount McKinley (Denali)
- Mount Koven (Wyoming), a peak in the Wind River Range of Wyoming
