= Mount Woodrow Wilson =

Mountain in the state of Wyoming

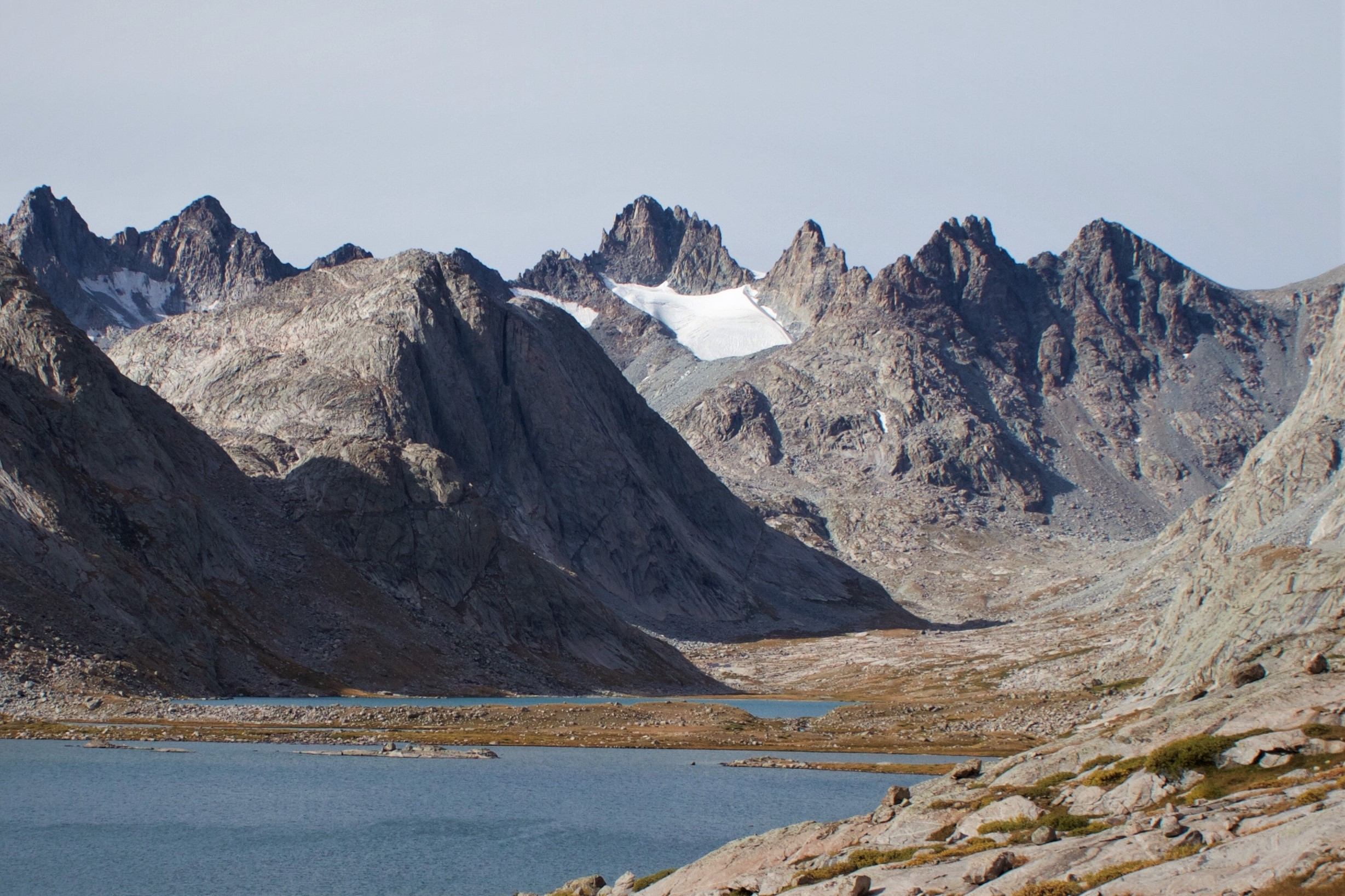
- South aspect centered above glacier

Highest point
- Elevation: 13,502 ft (4,115 m)
- Prominence: 502 ft (153 m)
- Coordinates: 43°10′01″N 109°39′06″W

Geography
- Location within Wyoming Location within the United States
- Location: Fremont / Sublette counties, Wyoming, U.S.
- Parent range: Wind River Range
- Topo map: USGS Gannett Peak

Climbing
- First ascent: 1924 by Albert Bessine, Edgar Doll and Carol Thompson-Jones

Mount Woodrow Wilson (13,502 feet (4,115 m)) is located in the Wind River Range in the U.S. state of Wyoming. Mount Woodrow Wilson is the eighth-highest mountain in the range and the ninth-highest in Wyoming. The summit is located in the Bridger Wilderness of Bridger-Teton National Forest on the Continental Divide, 1.25 miles (2.01 km) south of Gannett Peak. The flanks of the mountain are covered in snowfields and glaciers, including Dinwoody Glacier to the northeast, Mammoth Glacier to the west and Sphinx Glacier to the south.

It is named after the U.S. president Woodrow Wilson.

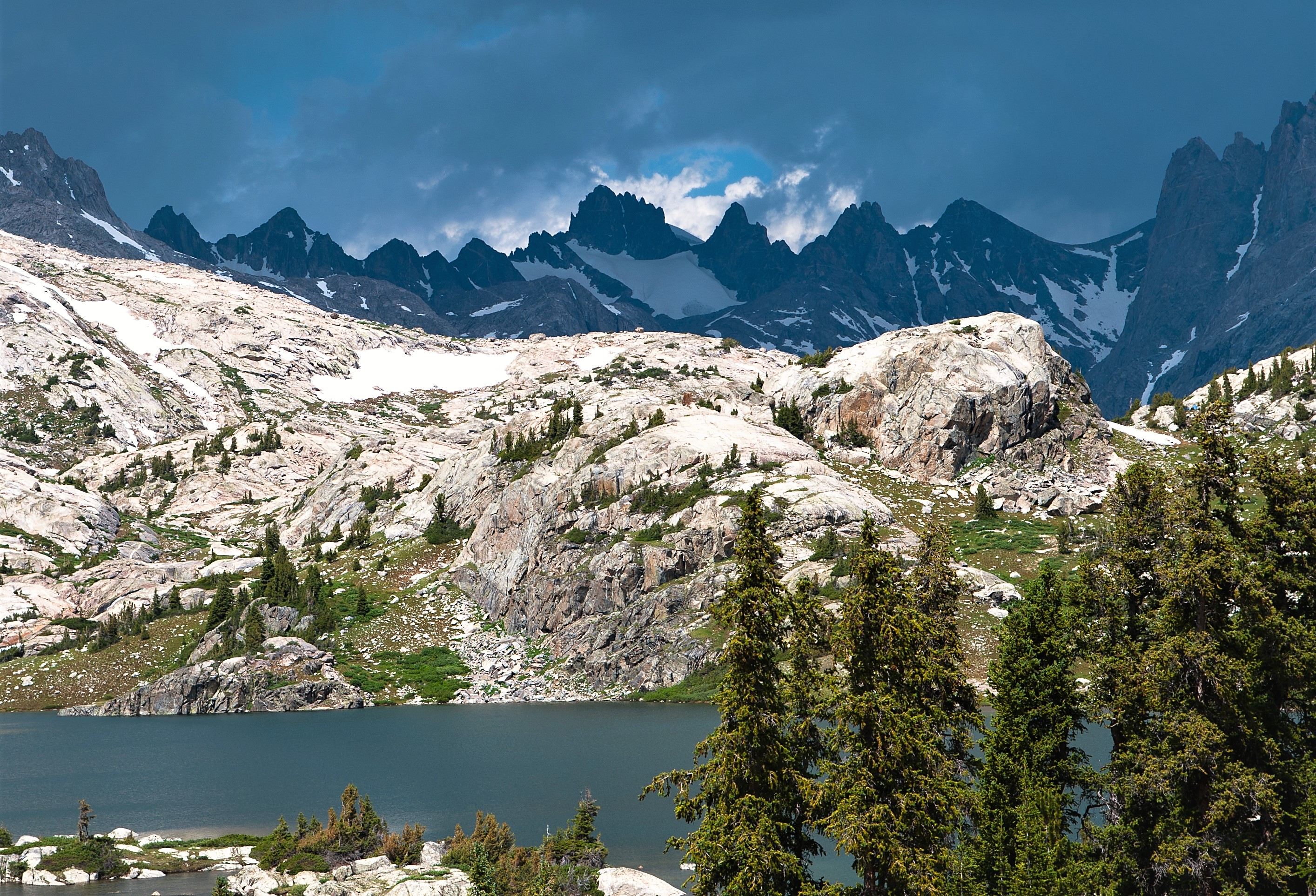
South aspect centered at top

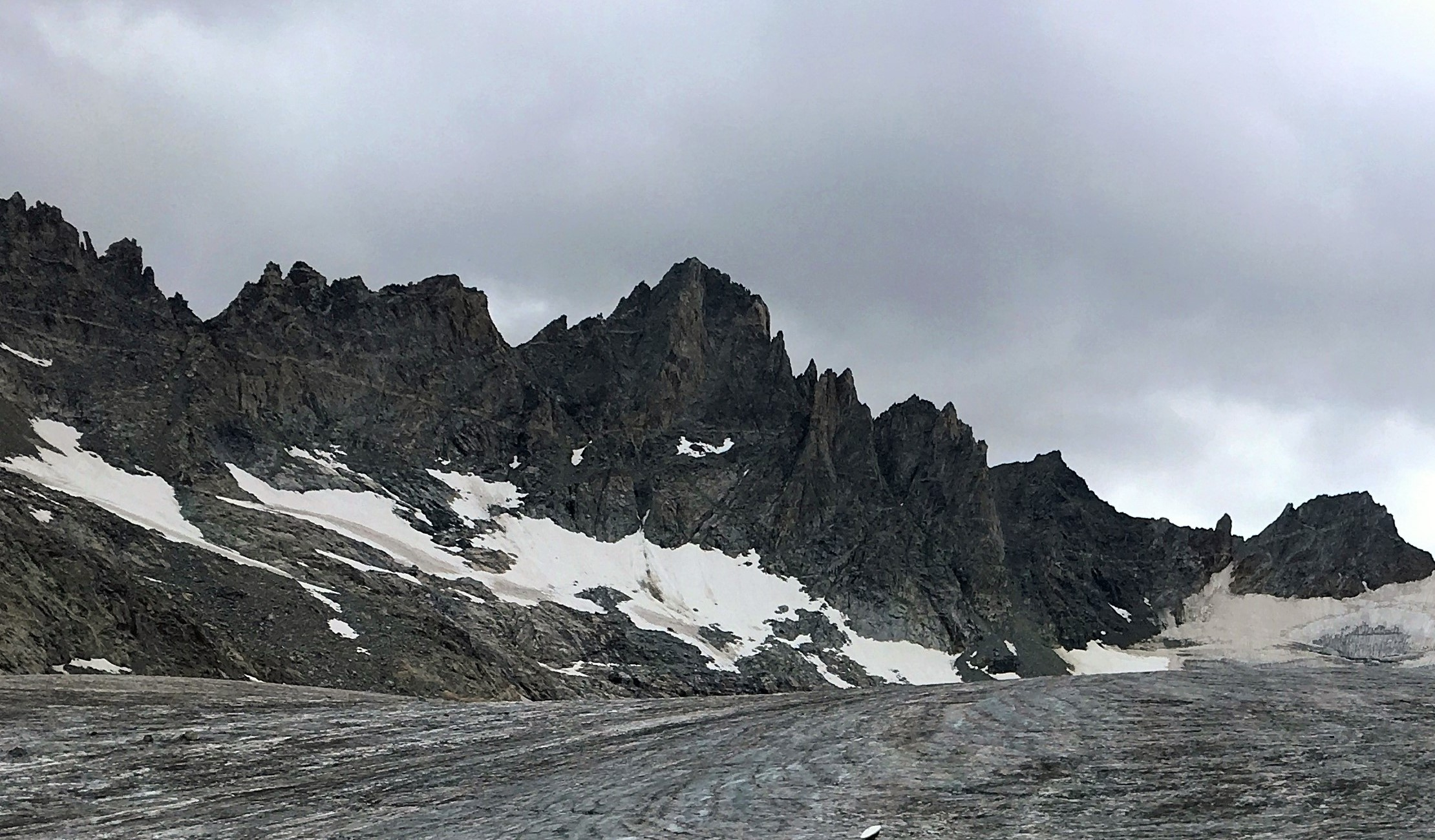
Northwest aspect of Mount Woodrow Wilson centered above Mammoth Glacier

== Hazards ==
Encountering bears is a concern in the Wind River Range. There are other concerns as well, including bugs, wildfires, adverse snow conditions and nighttime cold temperatures.

Importantly, there have been notable incidents, including accidental deaths, due to falls from steep cliffs (a misstep could be fatal in this class 4/5 terrain) and due to falling rocks, over the years, including 1993, 2007 (involving an experienced NOLS leader), 2015 and 2018. Other incidents include a seriously injured backpacker being airlifted near Squaretop Mountain in 2005, and a fatal hiker incident (from an apparent accidental fall) in 2006 that involved state search and rescue. The U.S. Forest Service does not offer updated aggregated records on the official number of fatalities in the Wind River Range.

== See also ==
- Thirteener
