= Bastion Peak =

Mountain in Wyoming, USA

- Location within Wyoming Location within the United States

Highest point
- Elevation: 13,500 ft (4,100 m)
- Prominence: 734 ft (224 m)
- Coordinates: 43°12′22″N 109°39′54″W

Geography
- Location: Fremont / Sublette counties, Wyoming, U.S.
- Parent range: Wind River Range
- Topo map: USGS Gannett Peak

Bastion Peak, at 13,500 feet (4,100 m), is located in the Wind River Range in the U.S. state of Wyoming. The peak is the ninth-highest in the range and the tenth-highest in Wyoming. The summit is located on the Continental Divide and the eastern slopes of the mountain are covered by a section of Gannett Glacier, the largest glacier in the American Rocky Mountains. An arête to the northeast leads to Bastion Peak-Northeast Peak, which, at 13,476 ft (4,107 m), is also one of the highest points in Wyoming.

== Hazards ==
Encountering bears is a concern in the Wind River Range. There are other concerns as well, including bugs, wildfires, adverse snow conditions and nighttime cold temperatures.

Importantly, there have been notable incidents, including accidental deaths, due to falls from steep cliffs (a misstep could be fatal in this class 4/5 terrain) and due to falling rocks, over the years, including 1993, 2007 (involving an experienced NOLS leader), 2015 and 2018. Other incidents include a seriously injured backpacker being airlifted near SquareTop Mountain in 2005, and a fatal hiker incident (from an apparent accidental fall) in 2006 that involved state search and rescue. The U.S. Forest Service does not offer updated aggregated records on the official number of fatalities in the Wind River Range.
