= South Downs Mountain =

Mountain in the state of Wyoming

- Location within Wyoming Location within the United States

Highest point
- Elevation: 13,068 ft (3,983 m)
- Prominence: 422 ft (129 m)
- Coordinates: 43°17′05″N 109°41′07″W

Geography
- Location: Fremont / Sublette counties, Wyoming, U.S.
- Parent range: Wind River Range
- Topo map: USGS Downs Mountain

Geology
- Mountain type: Batholith

Climbing
- Easiest route: Scramble

South Downs Mountain (13,068 ft (3,983 m)) is located in the Wind River Range in the U.S. state of Wyoming. Downs Mountain is the 27th highest peak in Wyoming. The summit is on the Continental Divide in both Shoshone and Bridger-Teton National Forests and it is 1.85 mi (2.98 km) south-southwest of Downs Mountain.

== Hazards ==
Encountering bears is a concern in the Wind River Range. There are other concerns as well, including bugs, wildfires, adverse snow conditions and nighttime cold temperatures.

Importantly, there have been notable incidents, including accidental deaths, due to falls from steep cliffs (a misstep could be fatal in this class 4/5 terrain) and due to falling rocks, over the years, including 1993, 2007 (involving an experienced NOLS leader), 2015 and 2018. Other incidents include a seriously injured backpacker being airlifted near SquareTop Mountain in 2005, and a fatal hiker incident (from an apparent accidental fall) in 2006 that involved state search and rescue. The U.S. Forest Service does not offer updated aggregated records on the official number of fatalities in the Wind River Range.
