= Klondike Peak =

Mountain in Wyoming, United States of America

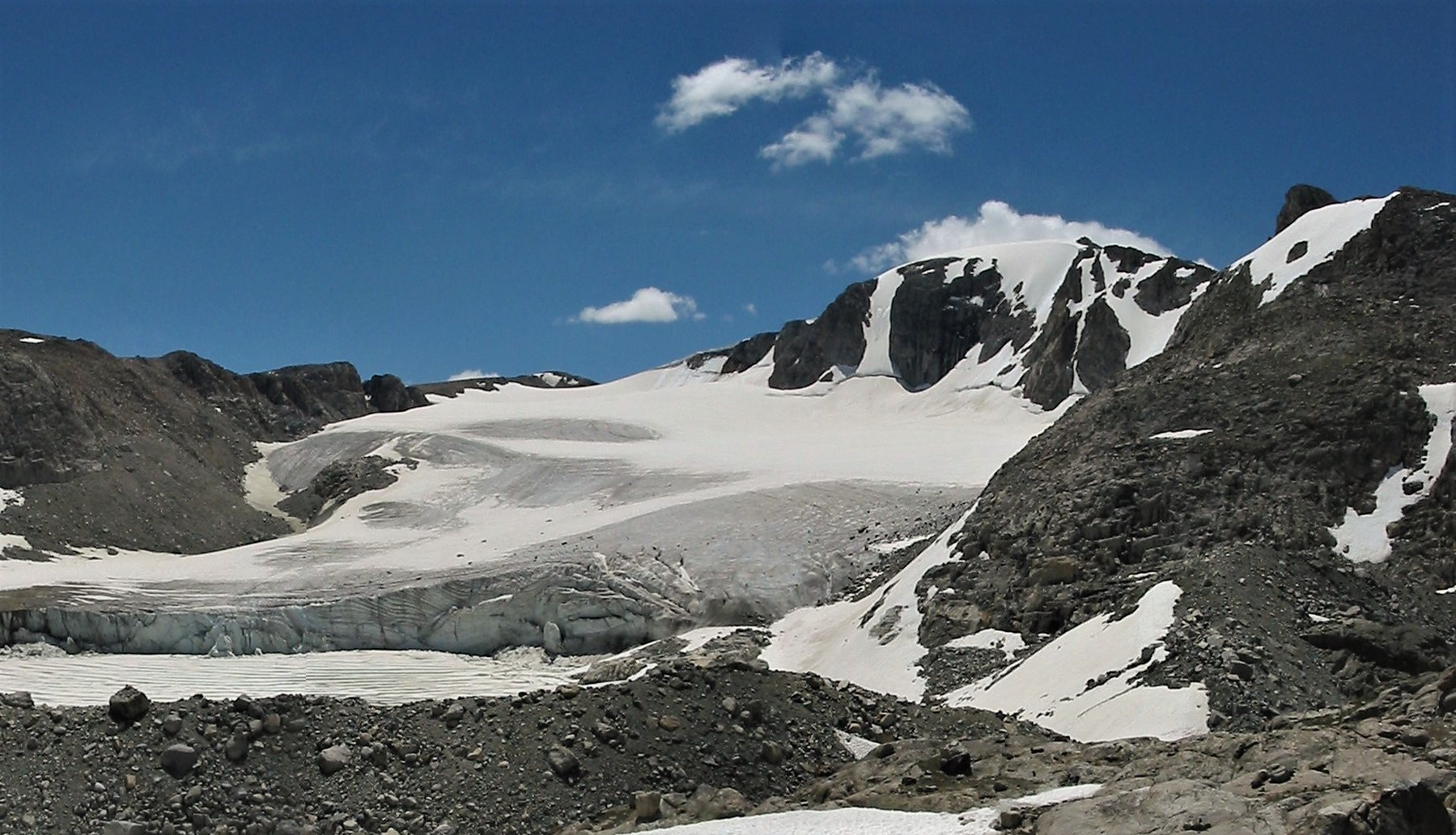
- Klondike Peak and Sourdough Glacier

Highest point
- Elevation: 13,120 ft (4,000 m)
- Prominence: 664 ft (202 m)
- Coordinates: 43°14′11″N 109°41′17″W

Geography
- Location within Wyoming Location within the United States
- Location: Sublette County, Wyoming, U.S.
- Parent range: Wind River Range
- Topo map: USGS Gannett Peak

Climbing
- First ascent: 1961 (Bill Kerns and Finis Mitchell)
- Easiest route: Scramble

Klondike Peak (13,120 ft (4,000 m)) is located in the northern Wind River Range in the U.S. state of Wyoming. Situated 4 mi (6.4 km) north of Gannett Peak, Klondike Peak is within the Bridger Wilderness of Bridger-Teton National Forest and west of the Continental Divide. The summit of Klondike Peak is partially capped by a small glacier and the northwest flank of the peak is the origination point of J Glacier, while Sourdough Glacier lies just to the northeast. Klondike Peak is the 26th tallest peak in Wyoming.

== Hazards ==
Encountering bears is a concern in the Wind River Range. There are other concerns as well, including bugs, wildfires, adverse snow conditions and nighttime cold temperatures.

Importantly, there have been notable incidents, including accidental deaths, due to falls from steep cliffs (a misstep could be fatal in this class 4/5 terrain) and due to falling rocks, over the years, including 1993, 2007 (involving an experienced NOLS leader), 2015 and 2018. Other incidents include a seriously injured backpacker being airlifted near SquareTop Mountain in 2005, and a fatal hiker incident (from an apparent accidental fall) in 2006 that involved state search and rescue. The U.S. Forest Service does not offer updated aggregated records on the official number of fatalities in the Wind River Range.

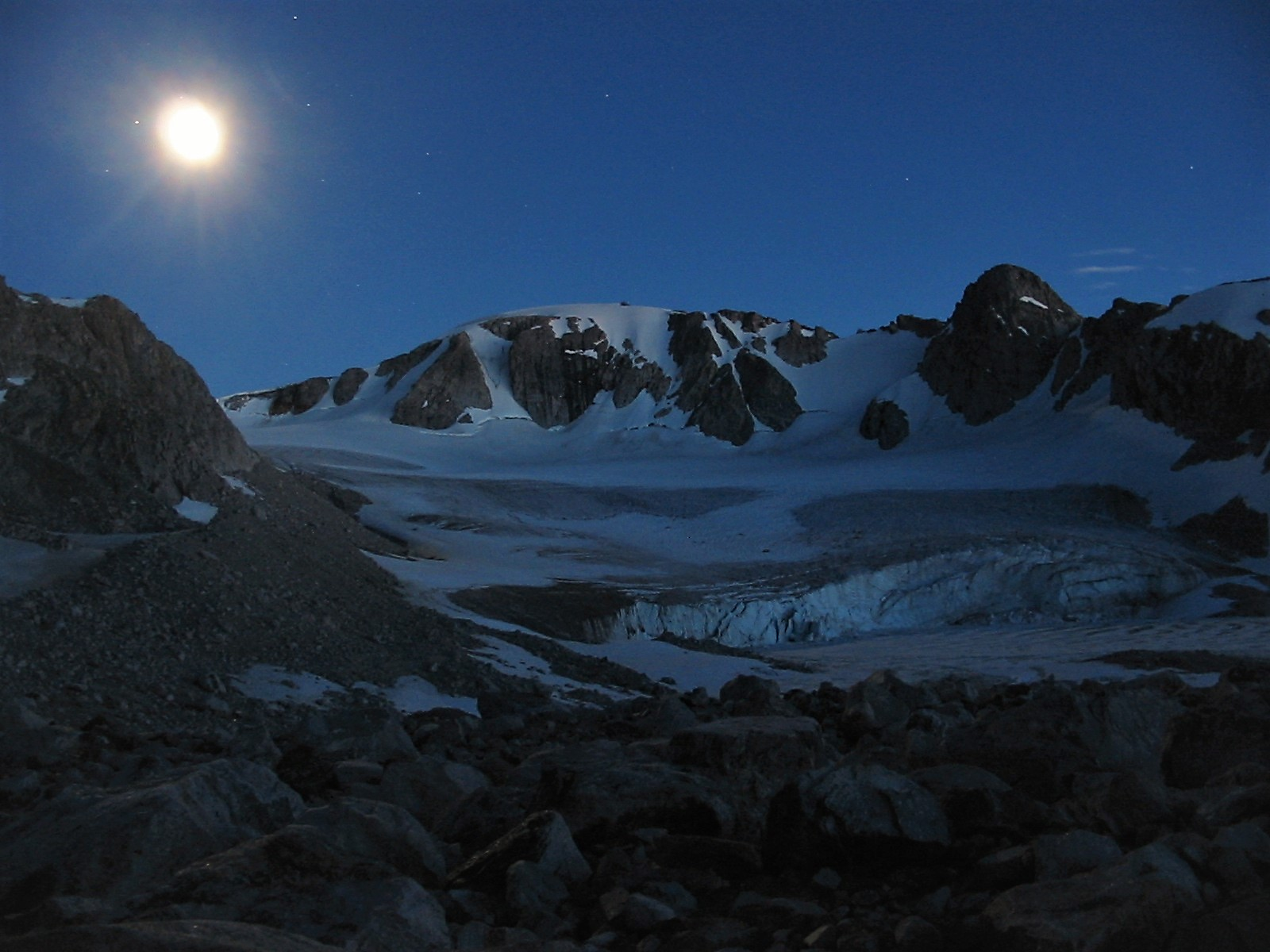
Moon over Klondike Peak
