= Sunbeam Peak =

Mountain in Wyoming, United States

- Location within Wyoming Location within the United States

Highest point
- Elevation: 13,446–13,486 ft (4,098–4,111 m)
- Prominence: 560 ft (170 m)
- Coordinates: 43°10′14″N 109°37′04″W

Geography
- Location: Fremont County, Wyoming, U.S.
- Parent range: Wind River Range
- Topo map: USGS Fremont Peak North

Geology
- Mountain type: Batholith

Climbing
- First ascent: 1938

Sunbeam Peak (13,446–13,486 ft (4,098–4,111 m)) is located in the Wind River Range in the U.S. state of Wyoming. The peak is the 13th highest summit in Wyoming. The summit is located in Shoshone National Forest and the Heap Steep Glacier lies on the north slopes of the mountain.

== Hazards ==
Encountering bears is a concern in the Wind River Range. There are other concerns as well, including bugs, wildfires, adverse snow conditions and nighttime cold temperatures.

Importantly, there have been notable incidents, including accidental deaths, due to falls from steep cliffs (a misstep could be fatal in this class 4/5 terrain) and due to falling rocks, over the years, including 1993, 2007 (involving an experienced NOLS leader), 2015 and 2018. Other incidents include a seriously injured backpacker being airlifted near SquareTop Mountain in 2005, and a fatal hiker incident (from an apparent accidental fall) in 2006 that involved state search and rescue. The U.S. Forest Service does not offer updated aggregated records on the official number of fatalities in the Wind River Range.
