= Wind River Glacier =

Glacier in Wyoming, United States

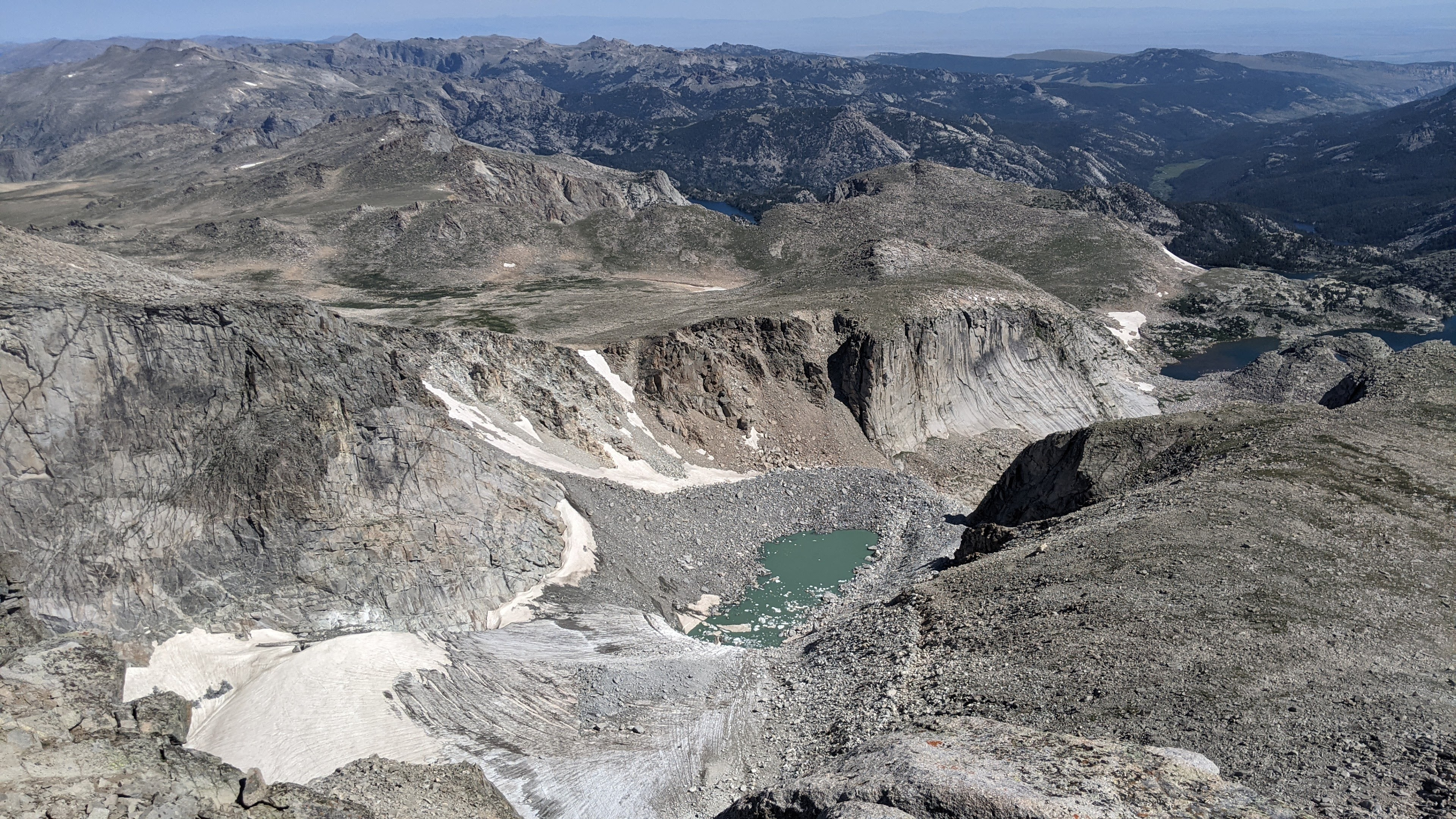
- Wind River Glacier viewed from the summit of Wind River Peak

- Location within Wyoming
- Type: Mountain glacier
- Location: Fremont County, Wyoming, USA
- Coordinates: 42°42′31″N 109°07′41″W
- Length: .45 mi (0.72 km)
- Terminus: Proglacial lake
- Status: Unknown

Wind River Glacier is in the Wind River Range, Shoshone National Forest, in the U.S. state of Wyoming. The glacier is situated on the northeast slope of Wind River Peak (13,192 feet (4,021 m)), the tallest peak in the southern Wind River Range.

== See also ==
- List of glaciers in the United States
- List of glaciers in Wyoming
- Retreat of glaciers since 1850
