= Wind River Peak =

Mountain in Wyoming, United States

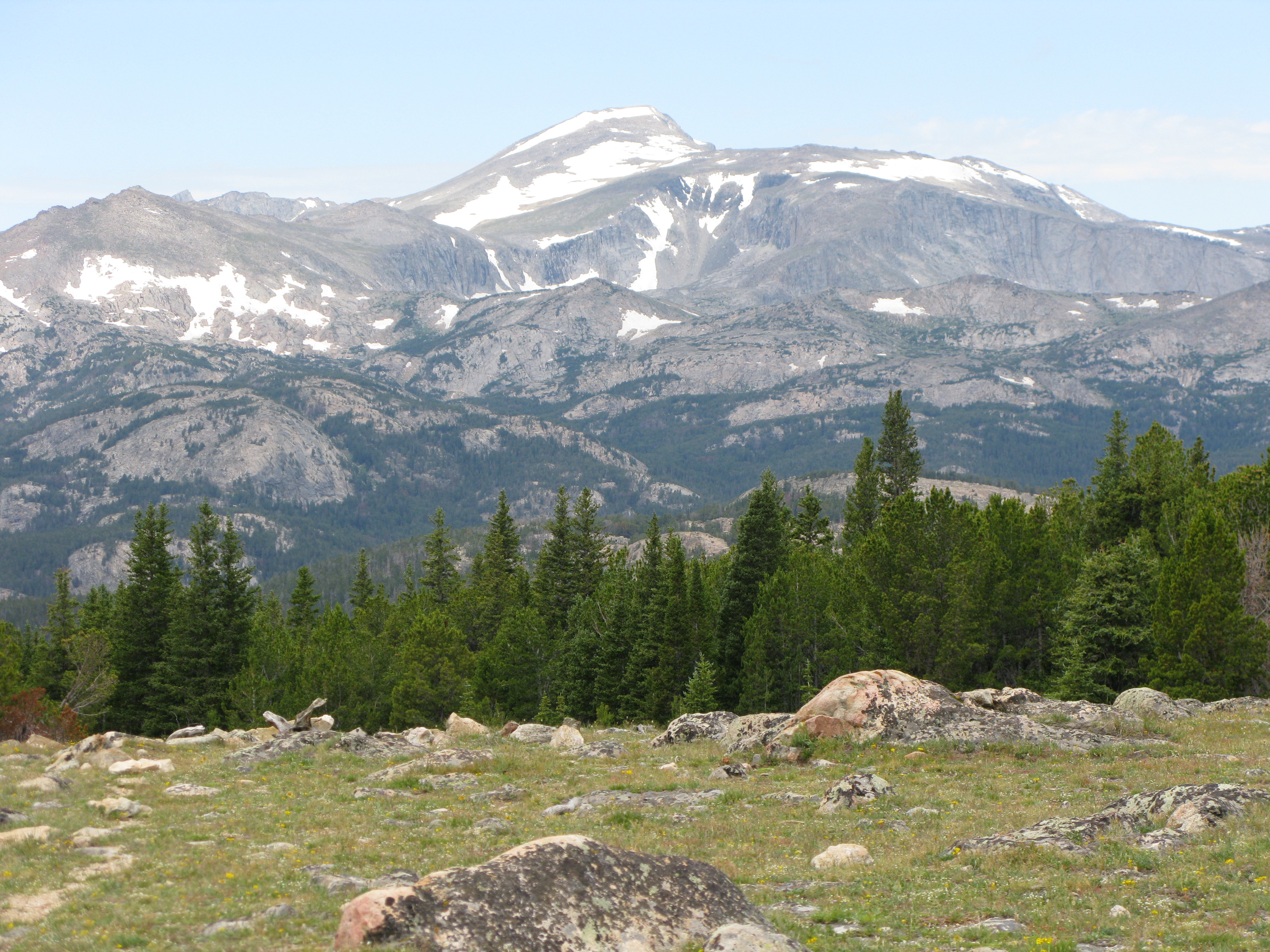
- Wind River Peak (center) seen from a distance in July 2010.

Highest point
- Elevation: 13,197 ft (4,022 m)
- Prominence: 2,552 ft (778 m)
- Listing: North America highest peaks 114th; US highest major peaks 95th
- Coordinates: 42°42′31″N 109°07′41″W

Geography
- Location within Wyoming Location within the United States
- Location: Fremont / Sublette counties, Wyoming, U.S.
- Parent range: Wind River Range
- Topo map: USGS Temple Peak

Climbing
- First ascent: 1873, Theodore Comstock, L. Hardy
- Easiest route: Hike, scramble

Wind River Peak (13,197 feet (4,022 m)) is the highest point in the southern end of the Wind River Range that is located in the U.S. state of Wyoming. The peak straddles the Continental Divide and is surrounded by National Forest lands. The west slopes are in the Bridger Wilderness of Bridger-Teton National Forest, while the east side is in the Popo Agie Wilderness of Shoshone National Forest. In a cirque on the northeast slopes of the peak lies Wind River Glacier.

== Climate ==
Climate data for Wind River Peak 42.7092 N, 109.1254 W, Elevation: 12,661 ft (3,859 m) (1991–2020 normals)
| Month | Jan | Feb | Mar | Apr | May | Jun | Jul | Aug | Sep | Oct | Nov | Dec | Year |
|---|---|---|---|---|---|---|---|---|---|---|---|---|---|
| Mean daily maximum °F (°C) | 18.8 (−7.3) | 18.4 (−7.6) | 24.0 (−4.4) | 29.4 (−1.4) | 38.2 (3.4) | 48.8 (9.3) | 58.1 (14.5) | 56.7 (13.7) | 48.3 (9.1) | 36.2 (2.3) | 24.6 (−4.1) | 18.3 (−7.6) | 35.0 (1.7) |
| Daily mean °F (°C) | 9.8 (−12.3) | 8.9 (−12.8) | 13.8 (−10.1) | 18.5 (−7.5) | 26.7 (−2.9) | 36.9 (2.7) | 45.2 (7.3) | 44.5 (6.9) | 36.1 (2.3) | 25.3 (−3.7) | 16.1 (−8.8) | 9.6 (−12.4) | 24.3 (−4.3) |
| Mean daily minimum °F (°C) | 0.9 (−17.3) | −0.7 (−18.2) | 3.6 (−15.8) | 7.6 (−13.6) | 15.1 (−9.4) | 25.0 (−3.9) | 32.3 (0.2) | 32.3 (0.2) | 23.9 (−4.5) | 14.5 (−9.7) | 7.5 (−13.6) | 0.9 (−17.3) | 13.6 (−10.2) |
| Average precipitation inches (mm) | 3.39 (86) | 3.37 (86) | 3.92 (100) | 5.09 (129) | 5.46 (139) | 3.23 (82) | 1.81 (46) | 1.80 (46) | 2.39 (61) | 3.00 (76) | 2.99 (76) | 3.61 (92) | 40.06 (1,019) |
Source: PRISM Climate Group

== Hazards ==
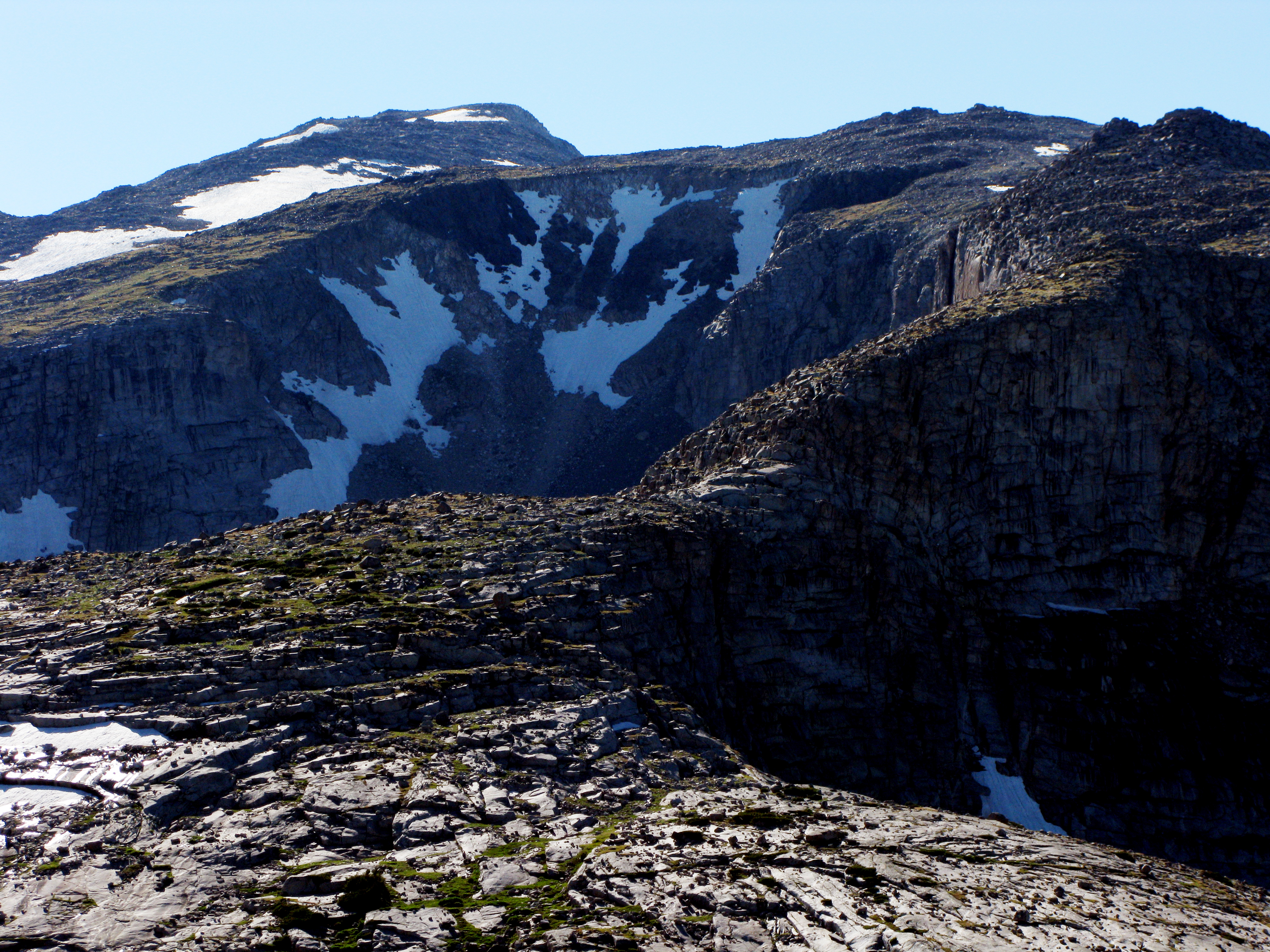
Wind River Peak near its base above Leg Lake in 2008

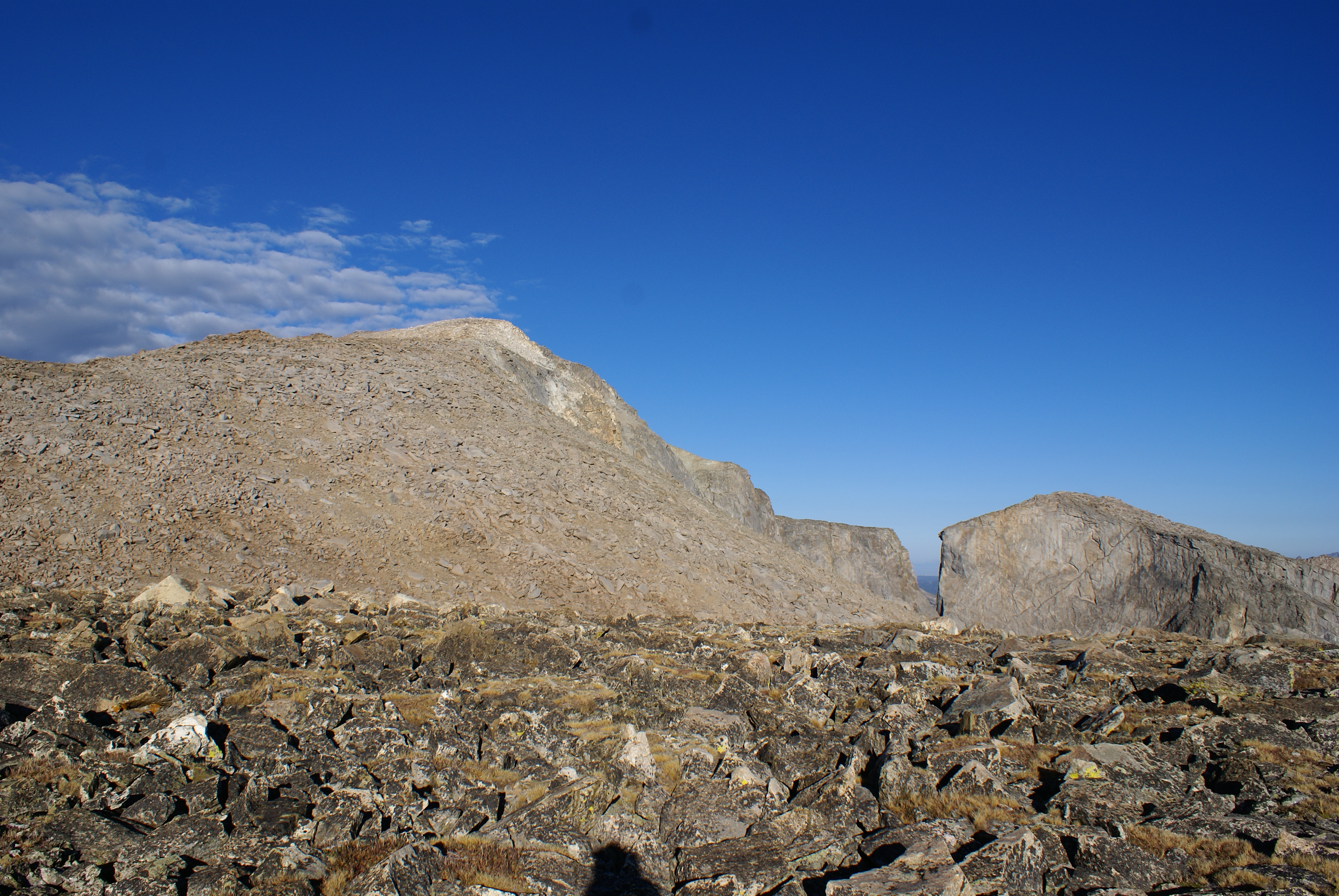
Wind River Peak, as seen from near Chimney Rock on the ascentwiki

Encountering bears is a concern in the Wind River Range. There are other concerns as well, including bugs, wildfires, adverse snow conditions and nighttime cold temperatures.

Importantly, there have been notable incidents, including accidental deaths, due to falls from steep cliffs (a misstep could be fatal in this class 4/5 terrain) and due to falling rocks, over the years, including 1993, 2007 (involving an experienced NOLS leader), 2015 and 2018. Other incidents include a seriously injured backpacker being airlifted near SquareTop Mountain in 2005, and a fatal hiker incident (from an apparent accidental fall) in 2006 that involved state search and rescue. The U.S. Forest Service does not offer updated aggregated records on the official number of fatalities in the Wind River Range.

== See also ==
- 4000 meter peaks of North America
- Central Rocky Mountains
