= Banded Glacier =

Glacier in the state of Washington

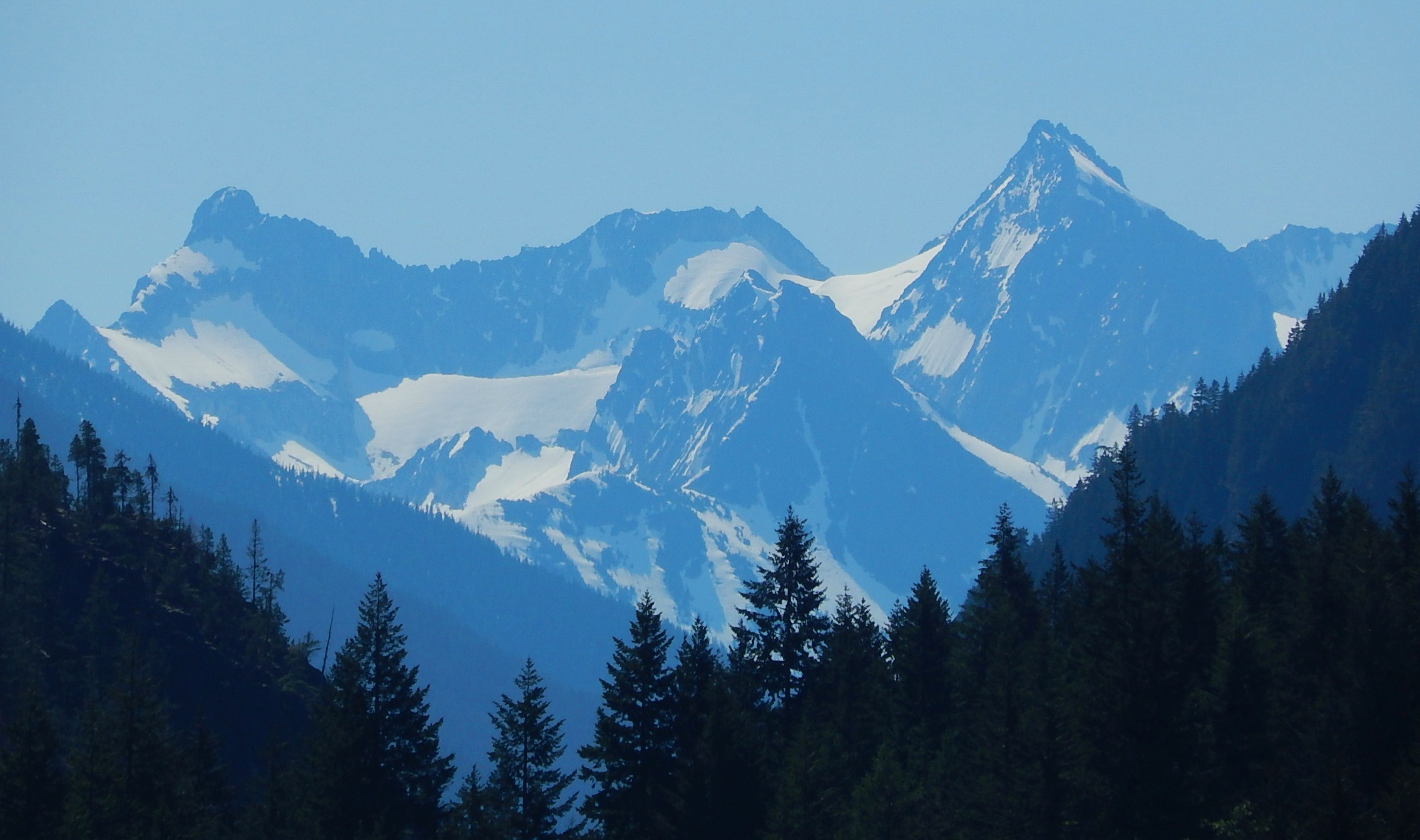
- Banded Glacier on Mount Logan

- Location within Washington (state)
- Type: Mountain glacier
- Location: North Cascades National Park, Skagit County, Washington, United States
- Coordinates: 48°32′40″N 120°57′08″W
- Length: .60 mi (0.97 km)
- Terminus: Proglacial lake
- Status: Retreating

Banded Glacier is located on the north slopes of Mount Logan, North Cascades National Park in the U.S. state of Washington. The glacier is approximately .60 mi (0.97 km) long and flows down from just east of the summit of Mount Logan to an elevation of approximately 7,200 ft (2,200 m) where it terminates at a proglacial lake.

== See also ==
- List of glaciers in the United States
