= Mount Logan (Washington) =

Mountain in North Cascades National Park, Washington

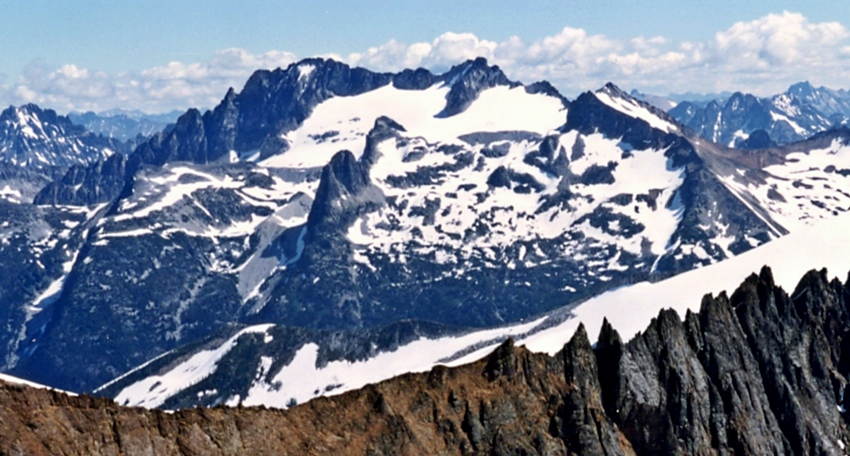

Highest point
- Elevation: 9,087 ft (2,770 m)
- Prominence: 1,487 ft (453 m)
- Coordinates: 48°32′12″N 120°57′07″W

Geography
- Location within Washington (state) Location within the United States
- Interactive map of Mount Logan
- Location: North Cascades National Park, Washington, U.S.
- Parent range: Cascade Range
- Topo map: USGS Mount Logan

Climbing
- First ascent: 1926 Lage Wernstedt
- Easiest route: Scramble/glacier traverse/class 3

Mount Logan (9,087 feet (2,770 m)) is located in North Cascades National Park in the U.S. state of Washington. Mount Logan is in a remote location of North Cascades National Park that requires hiking 20 mi (32 km) from a trailhead to reach the peak. The mountain itself is not a difficult climb, though the easiest approaches require traversing glaciers and ropes are recommended. The peak supports three glaciers including Banded Glacier to the north, Fremont Glacier to the southwest and Douglas Glacier on the southeast slopes.

== Climate ==
Mount Logan is located in the marine west coast climate zone of western North America. Most weather fronts originate in the Pacific Ocean, and travel northeast toward the Cascade Mountains. As fronts approach the North Cascades, they are forced upward by the peaks of the Cascade Range, causing them to drop their moisture in the form of rain or snowfall onto the Cascades (Orographic lift). As a result, the west side of the North Cascades experiences high precipitation, especially during the winter months in the form of snowfall. Due to its temperate climate and proximity to the Pacific Ocean, areas west of the Cascade Crest very rarely experience temperatures below 0 °F (−18 °C) or above 80 °F (27 °C). During winter months, weather is usually cloudy, but, due to high pressure systems over the Pacific Ocean that intensify during summer months, there is often little or no cloud cover during the summer. Because of maritime influence, snow tends to be wet and heavy, resulting in high avalanche danger.

Climate data for Mount Logan 48.5356 N, 120.9516 W, Elevation: 8,445 ft (2,574 m) (1991–2020 normals)
Month	Jan	Feb	Mar	Apr	May	Jun	Jul	Aug	Sep	Oct	Nov	Dec	Year
Mean daily maximum °F (°C)	24.9 (−3.9)	24.5 (−4.2)	25.8 (−3.4)	30.4 (−0.9)	39.1 (3.9)	45.3 (7.4)	55.4 (13.0)	56.1 (13.4)	50.4 (10.2)	39.6 (4.2)	27.9 (−2.3)	23.3 (−4.8)	36.9 (2.7)
Daily mean °F (°C)	20.1 (−6.6)	18.3 (−7.6)	18.5 (−7.5)	22.0 (−5.6)	30.2 (−1.0)	36.0 (2.2)	44.6 (7.0)	45.1 (7.3)	39.8 (4.3)	30.9 (−0.6)	22.6 (−5.2)	18.8 (−7.3)	28.9 (−1.7)
Mean daily minimum °F (°C)	15.2 (−9.3)	12.1 (−11.1)	11.1 (−11.6)	13.7 (−10.2)	21.2 (−6.0)	26.6 (−3.0)	33.7 (0.9)	34.1 (1.2)	29.2 (−1.6)	22.2 (−5.4)	17.2 (−8.2)	14.2 (−9.9)	20.9 (−6.2)
Average precipitation inches (mm)	18.05 (458)	12.37 (314)	13.67 (347)	8.21 (209)	5.49 (139)	4.38 (111)	2.60 (66)	3.06 (78)	5.92 (150)	16.34 (415)	23.67 (601)	20.51 (521)	134.27 (3,409)
Source: PRISM Climate Group

== Geology ==
The North Cascades features some of the most rugged topography in the Cascade Range with craggy peaks, ridges, and deep glacial valleys. Geological events occurring many years ago created the diverse topography and drastic elevation changes over the Cascade Range leading to the various climate differences. These climate differences lead to vegetation variety defining the ecoregions in this area.

The history of the formation of the Cascade Mountains dates back millions of years ago to the late Eocene Epoch. With the North American Plate overriding the Pacific Plate, episodes of volcanic igneous activity persisted. In addition, small fragments of the oceanic and continental lithosphere called terranes created the North Cascades about 50 million years ago.

During the Pleistocene period dating back over two million years ago, glaciation advancing and retreating repeatedly scoured the landscape leaving deposits of rock debris. The U-shaped cross section of the river valleys is a result of recent glaciation. Uplift and faulting in combination with glaciation have been the dominant processes which have created the tall peaks and deep valleys of the North Cascades area.

== Gallery ==
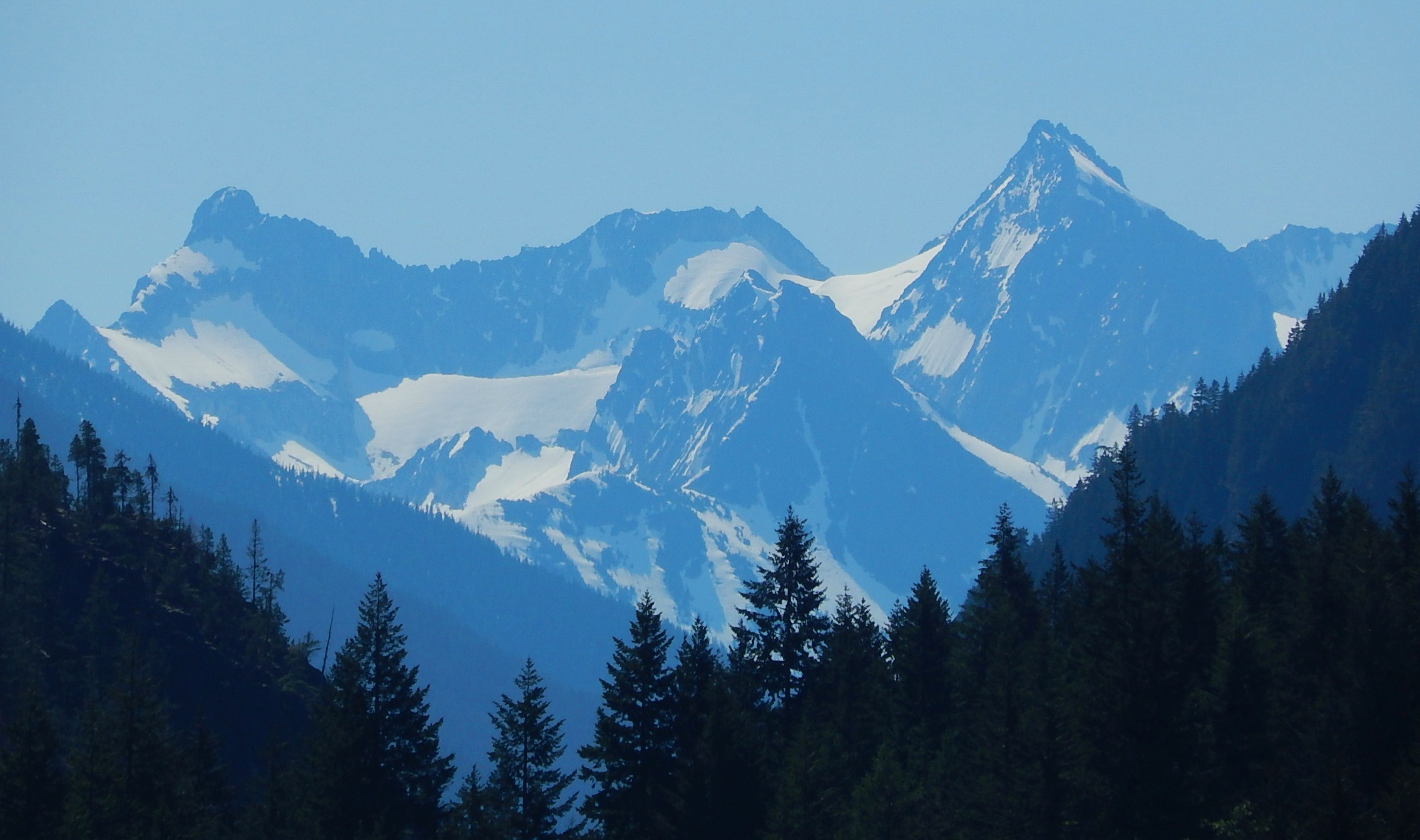
Logan seen from Diablo Lake

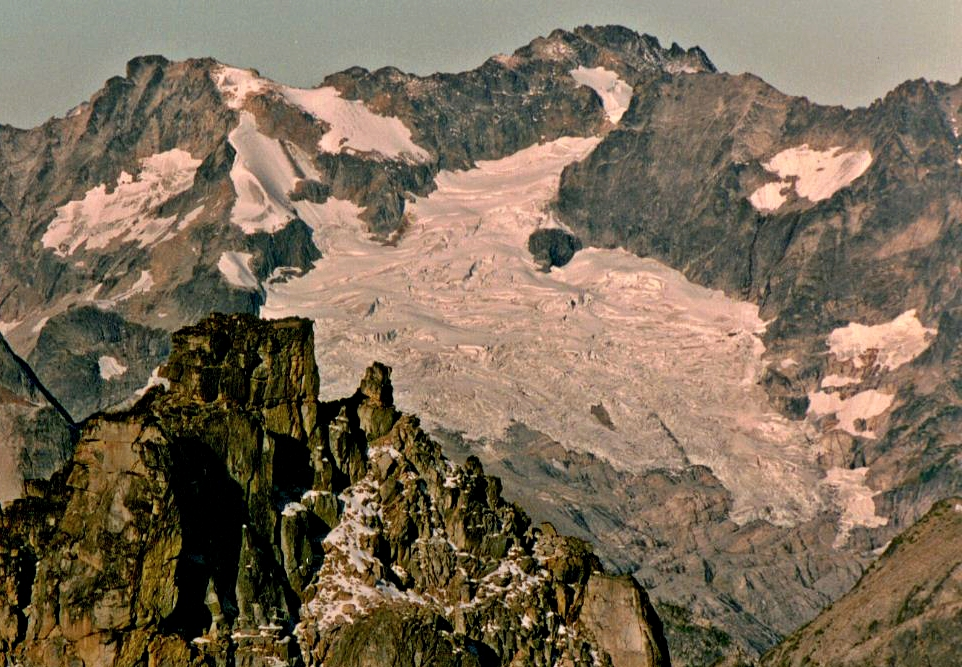
Douglas Glacier on Logan

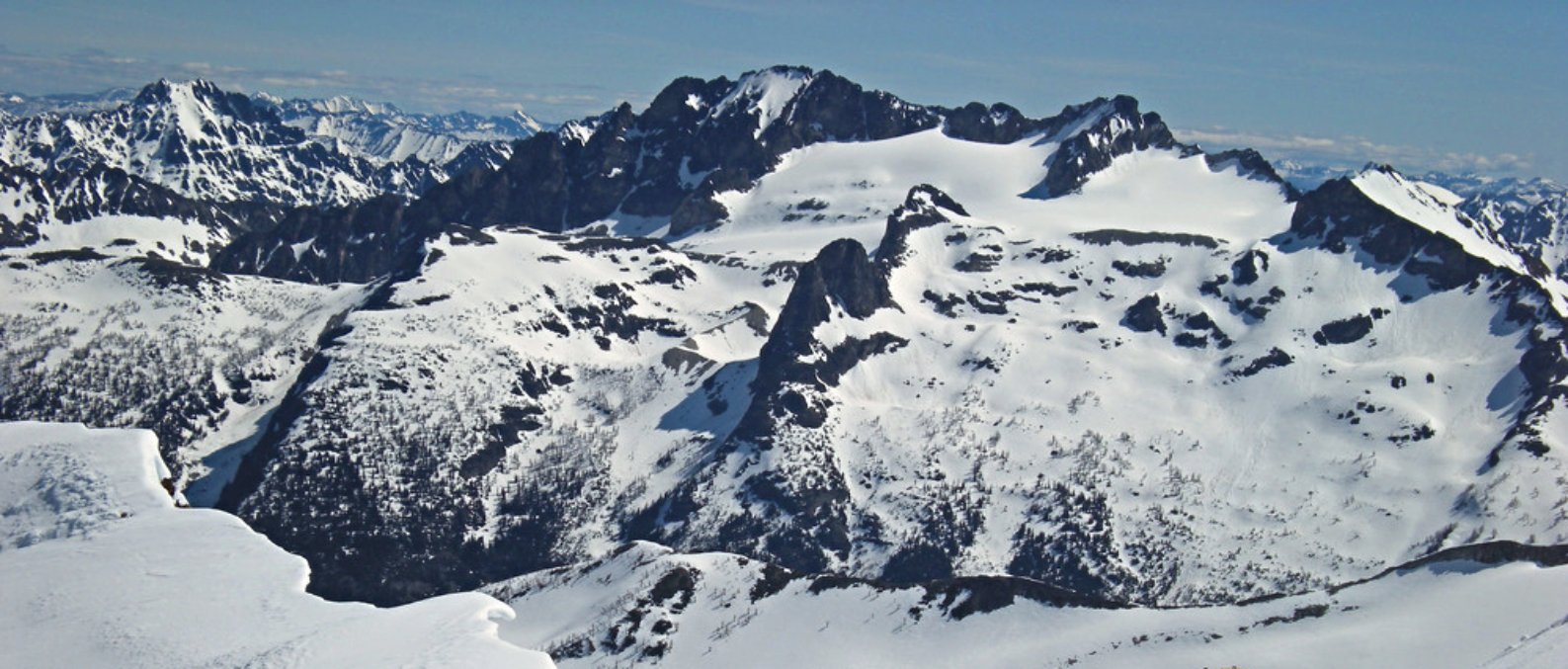
Logan seen from Boston-Sahale Col
