= Teton Glacier =

Glacier in Wyoming, United States

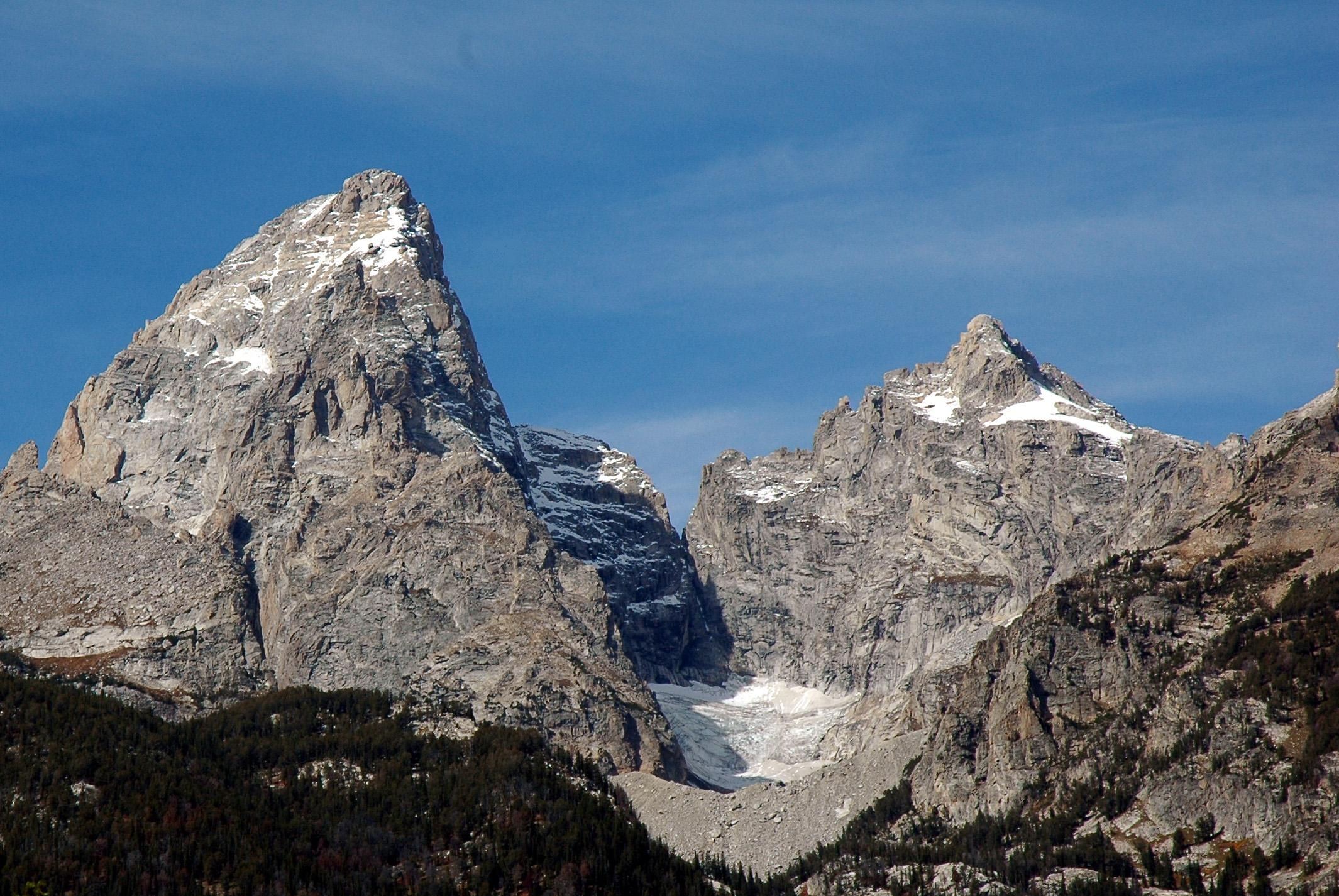
- Teton Glacier at bottom is to the right of Grand Teton and left of Mount Owen

- Location within Wyoming
- Type: Mountain glacier
- Location: Grand Teton National Park, Teton County, Wyoming, USA
- Coordinates: 43°44′31″N 110°47′35″W
- Area: 53 acres (0.21 km^{2})
- Length: .66 mi (1.06 km)
- Terminus: Moraine
- Status: Retreating

Teton Glacier is a mountain glacier located below the north face of Grand Teton (peak 13,775 feet (4,199 m)) in Grand Teton National Park, Wyoming, United States. Its neighbors are Mount Owen (12,933 feet (3,942 m)) to the west and Teewinot Mountain 12,330 feet (3,758 m) to the north.

Teton Glacier is the largest of the twelve named glaciers in the park and one of 37 glaciers in Wyoming. In 1971, the glacier was about 3,500 ft (1,100 m) long and 1,100 ft (340 m) wide. Between 1967 and 2006, Teton Glacier lost about 14 to 20 percent of its surface area, a reduction from 64 to 53 acres (26 to 21 ha).

== See also ==
- List of glaciers in the United States
