= Sphinx Glacier =

Glacier in Wyoming

- Location within Wyoming
- Type: Mountain glacier
- Location: Sublette County, Wyoming, USA
- Coordinates: 43°09′56″N 109°38′53″W
- Length: .40 mi (0.64 km)
- Terminus: Talus
- Status: Unknown

Sphinx Glacier is in the Wind River Range, Bridger-Teton National Forest, in the U.S. state of Wyoming. The glacier is situated on the southern slope of Mount Woodrow Wilson (13,502 ft (4,115 m)) and immediately west of the Continental Divide. The glacier is flanked on the east by a mountain known as The Sphinx (13,258 ft (4,041 m)). Sphinx Glacier is on the opposite side of the Continental Divide from Dinwoody Glacier.

== See also ==
- List of glaciers in the United States
