= Jackson Peak (Fremont County, Wyoming) =

Mountain in the state of Wyoming

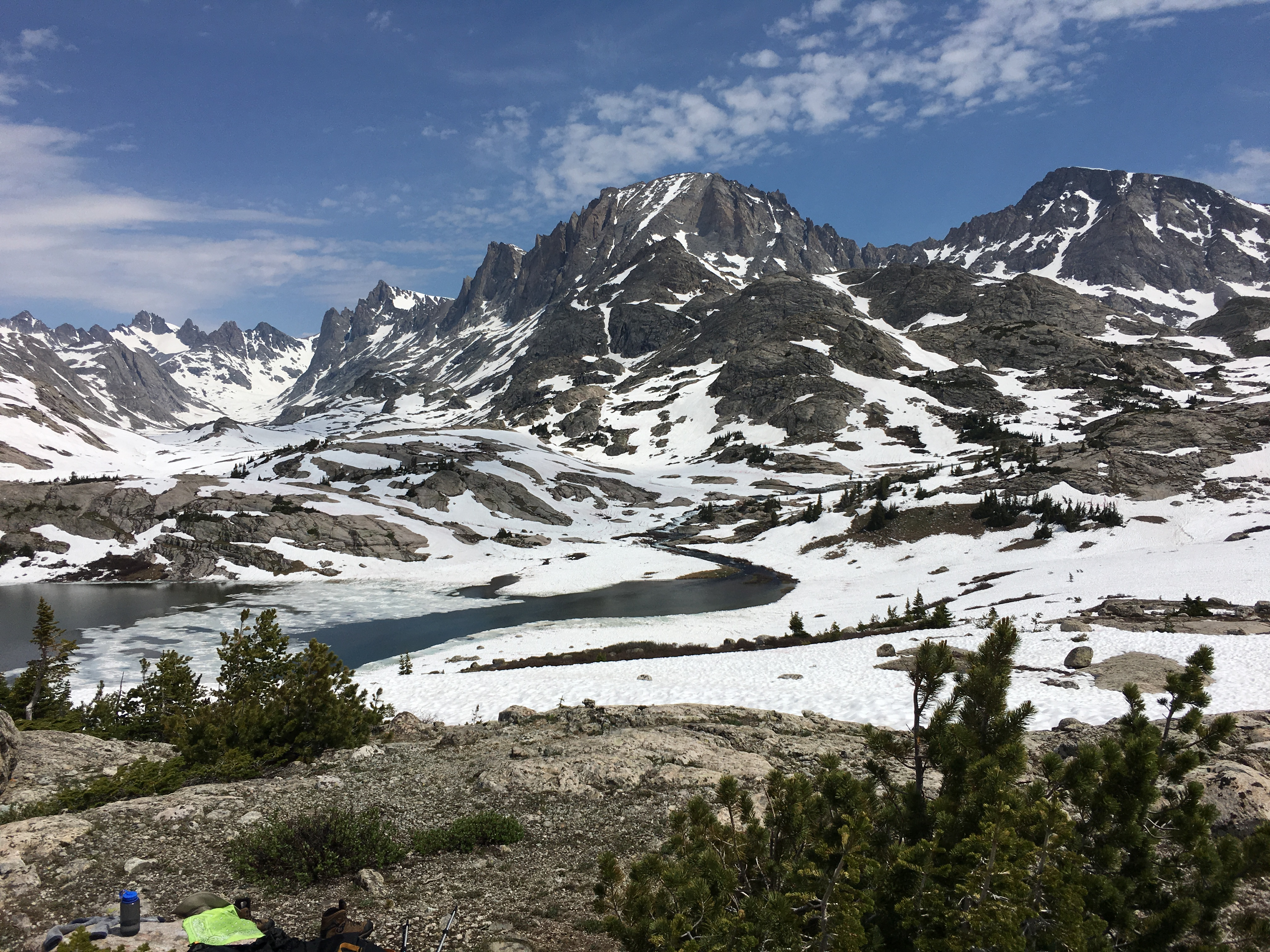
- Jackson Peak at right of Fremont Peak in center

Highest point
- Elevation: 13,523 ft (4,122 m)
- Prominence: 717 ft (219 m)
- Coordinates: 43°07′10″N 109°36′12″W

Geography
- Location within Wyoming Location within the United States
- Location: Fremont / Sublette counties, Wyoming, U.S.
- Parent range: Wind River Range
- Topo map: USGS Fremont Peak South (WY)

Jackson Peak 13,523 feet (4,122 m) is the eighth-highest peak in the U.S. state of Wyoming and the seventh-highest in the Wind River Range. The Bull Lake Glacier is located immediately north and east of the mountain. Situated on the Continental Divide, Jackson Peak is .75 miles (1.21 km) southeast of Fremont Peak.

== Hazards ==
Encountering bears is a concern in the Wind River Range. There are other concerns as well, including bugs, wildfires, adverse snow conditions and nighttime cold temperatures.

Importantly, there have been notable incidents, including accidental deaths, due to falls from steep cliffs (a misstep could be fatal in this class 4/5 terrain) and due to falling rocks, over the years, including 1993, 2007 (involving an experienced NOLS leader), 2015 and 2018. Other incidents include a seriously injured backpacker being airlifted near SquareTop Mountain in 2005, and a fatal hiker incident (from an apparent accidental fall) in 2006 that involved state search and rescue. The U.S. Forest Service does not offer updated aggregated records on the official number of fatalities in the Wind River Range.
