= Gooseneck Glacier =

Glacier in Wyoming, United States

- Location within Wyoming
- Type: Mountain glacier
- Location: Fremont County, Wyoming, USA
- Coordinates: 43°10′55″N 109°38′54″W
- Length: .45 mi (0.72 km)
- Terminus: Talus/moraines
- Status: retreating

Gooseneck Glacier is located in the Fitzpatrick Wilderness, Shoshone National Forest, in the US state of Wyoming. The glacier is east of the Continental Divide in the northern Wind River Range and on the southeast flank of Gannett Peak, the tallest mountain in Wyoming. Gooseneck Glacier is separated from Dinwoody Glacier by a rocky outcropping and they are part of the largest grouping of glaciers in the American Rocky Mountains.

== See also ==
- List of glaciers in the United States
