= Fremont Glacier (Washington) =

Glacier in the state of Washington

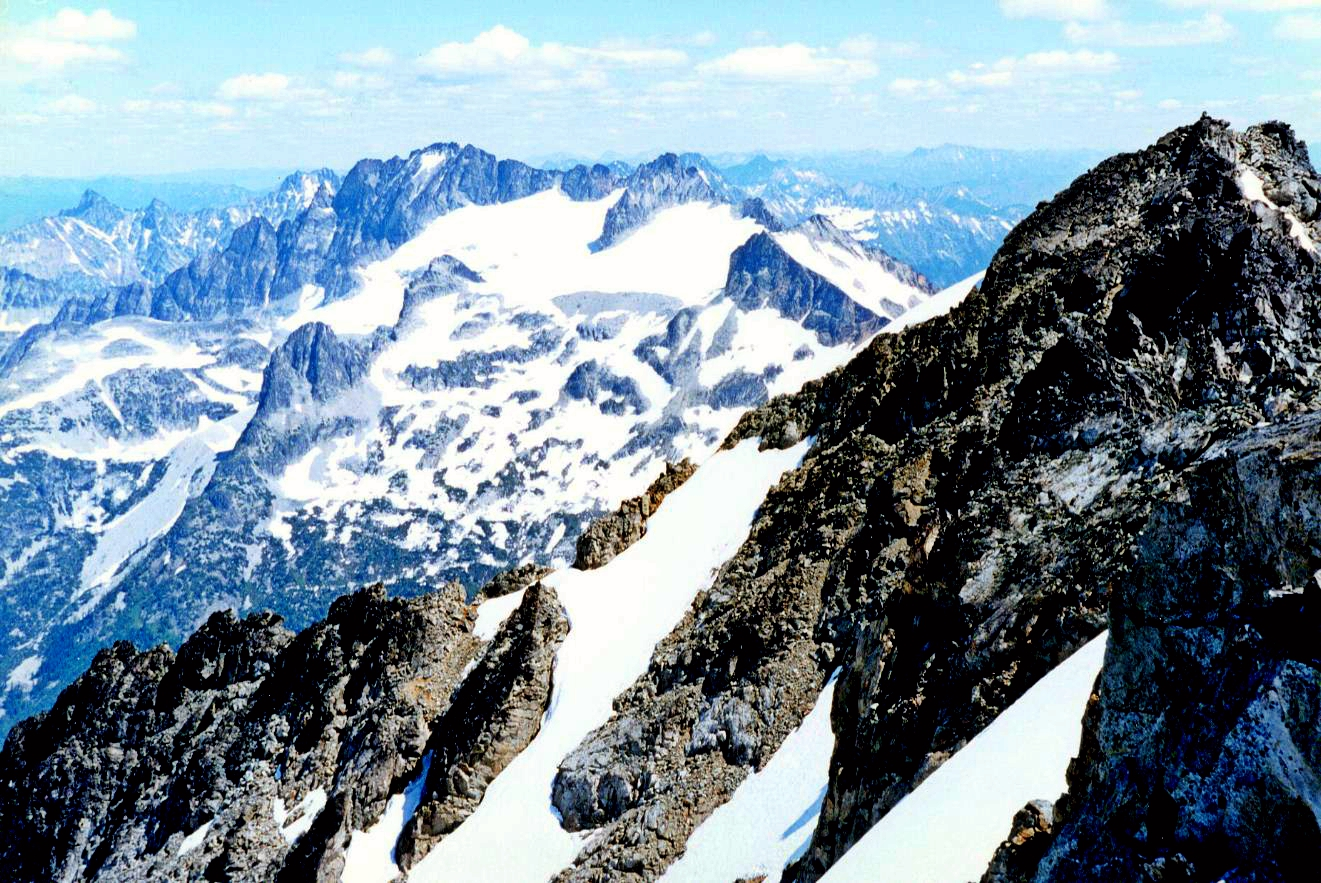
- Fremont Glacier seen from Mount Buckner

- Location within Washington (state)
- Type: Mountain glacier
- Location: North Cascades National Park, Skagit County, Washington, United States
- Coordinates: 48°31′47″N 120°57′26″W
- Length: .5 mi (0.80 km)
- Terminus: Icefall
- Status: Retreating

Fremont Glacier is located on the southeast slopes of Mount Logan, North Cascades National Park in the U.S. state of Washington. The glacier is approximately .50 mi (0.80 km) long but nearly 1 mi (1.6 km) wide and flows down from just southeast of the summit of Mount Logan to an elevation of approximately 7,200 ft (2,200 m).

== See also ==
- List of glaciers in the United States
