= Lower Fremont Glacier =

Glacier in Wyoming

- Location within Wyoming
- Type: Mountain glacier
- Location: Fremont County, Wyoming, USA
- Coordinates: 43°07′56″N 109°35′49″W
- Length: .50 mi (0.80 km)
- Terminus: Moraines/proglacial lake
- Status: Retreating

Lower Fremont Glacier is east of the Continental Divide in the northern Wind River Range in the U.S. state of Wyoming. The glacier is in the Fitzpatrick Wilderness of Shoshone National Forest, and is among the largest grouping of glaciers in the American Rocky Mountains. Lower Fremont Glacier flows to the southeast and the rapid retreat of this glacier has left behind lateral moraines and a proglacial lake. Lower Fremont Glacier is separated from the Bull Lake Glacier by a moraine and from the Upper Fremont Glacier by cliffs.

== See also ==
- List of glaciers in the United States
