= Sourdough Glacier =

Glacier in the state of Wyoming

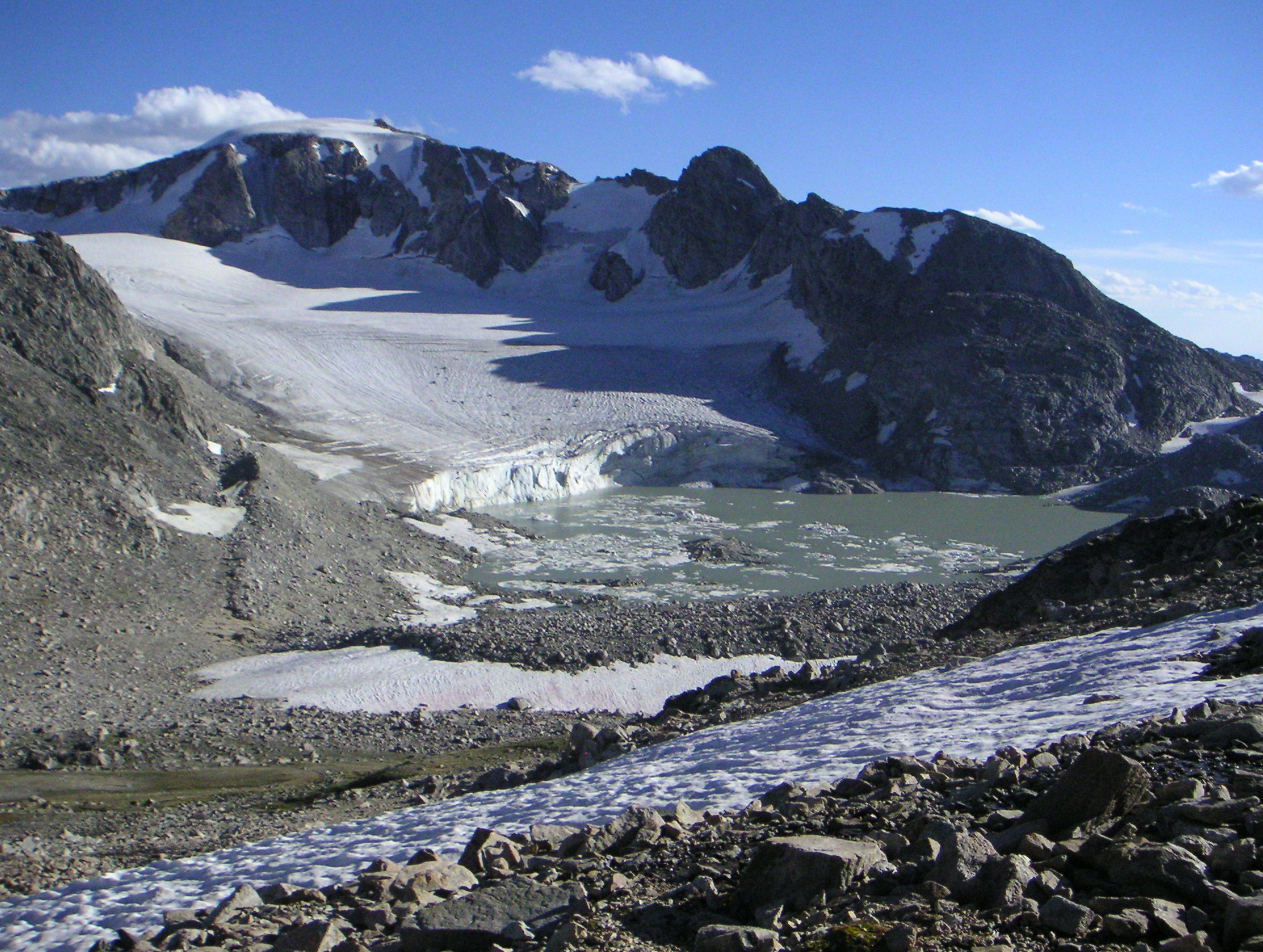
- Sourdough Glacier and Klondike Peak

- Location within Wyoming
- Type: Mountain glacier
- Location: Sublette County, Wyoming, USA
- Coordinates: 43°14′48″N 109°41′15″W
- Length: .85 mi (1.37 km)
- Terminus: proglacial lake
- Status: unknown

Sourdough Glacier is in the Wind River Range, Bridger-Teton National Forest in the U.S. state of Wyoming. Sourdough Glacier is in the Bridger Wilderness, and is part of the largest grouping of glaciers in the American Rocky Mountains. The glacier extends the from north slope of Klondike Peak at an elevation range of 12,800 to 11,800 ft (3,900 to 3,600 m) and flows into a proglacial lake.

== See also ==
- List of glaciers in the United States
