= Heap Steep Glacier =

Glacier in Wyoming

- Location within Wyoming
- Type: Mountain glacier
- Location: Fremont County, Wyoming, USA
- Coordinates: 43°10′30″N 109°37′03″W
- Length: .30 mi (0.48 km)
- Terminus: Talus
- Status: Retreating

Heap Steep Glacier is located east of the Continental Divide in the northern Wind River Range in the US state of Wyoming. The glacier is situated in the Fitzpatrick Wilderness of Shoshone National Forest, and is among the largest grouping of glaciers in the American Rocky Mountains. Heap Steep Glacier is in a north facing cirque, below the summit of Sunbeam Peak. A large terminal moraine and small proglacial lake are located below the glacier.

== See also ==
- List of glaciers in the United States
