= J Glacier =

Glacier in the state of Wyoming

- Location within Wyoming
- Type: Mountain glacier
- Location: Sublette County, Wyoming, USA
- Coordinates: 43°14′17″N 109°41′56″W
- Length: .35 mi (0.56 km)
- Terminus: proglacial lake
- Status: unknown

J Glacier is located in Bridger-Teton National Forest, in the US state of Wyoming on the west of the Continental Divide in the Wind River Range. J Glacier is in the Bridger Wilderness, and is part of the largest grouping of glaciers in the American Rocky Mountains. J Glacier flows down from the northwest slope of Klondike Peak and a proglacial lake has formed at the toe of the glacier.

== See also ==
- List of glaciers in the United States
