= Bull Lake Glacier =

Glacier in Wyoming

- Location within Wyoming
- Type: Mountain glacier
- Location: Fremont County, Wyoming, USA
- Coordinates: 43°07′28″N 109°35′56″W
- Area: 250 acres (100 ha)
- Length: 1 mi (1.6 km)
- Width: .40 mi (0.64 km)
- Terminus: Talus
- Status: Retreating

Bull Lake Glacier is located immediately east of the Continental Divide in the northern Wind River Range in the U.S. state of Wyoming. The glacier is in the Fitzpatrick Wilderness of Shoshone National Forest, and is among the largest grouping of glaciers in the American Rocky Mountains. Bull Lake Glacier flows to the east and starts below the summit of Jackson Peak. It is adjacent to Lower Fremont Glacier though the two are separated by a moraine.

== See also ==
- List of glaciers in the United States
