= Grasshopper Glacier (Wyoming) =

Glacier in Wyoming, United States

- Location within Wyoming
- Type: Mountain glacier
- Location: Fremont County, Wyoming, USA
- Coordinates: 43°14′12″N 109°39′55″W
- Length: 1.3 mi (2.1 km)
- Terminus: outflow stream/proglacial lake
- Status: retreating

Grasshopper Glacier is located in Shoshone National Forest, in the US state of Wyoming on the east of the Continental Divide in the Wind River Range. Grasshopper Glacier is in the Fitzpatrick Wilderness, and is part of the largest grouping of glaciers in the American Rocky Mountains. The glacier flows north, and glacial runoff supplies water to Grasshopper Creek, flowing eventually into the Wind River. The glacier shares a glacial margin with Klondike Glacier, located to the south. The glacier is named for grasshoppers that have been found entombed in the ice.

Between September 6 and 10, 2003, a glacial lake outburst flood (GLOF) was recorded when the proglacial lake at the head of the glacier burst through a glacial dam, and water from the lake carved a trench down the center of the glacier for over a half-mile (.8 km). An estimated 650 million gallons of water were released in four days, raising the flow level of Dinwoody Creek from 200 ft^{3} (5.7×10^{−9} km^{3}) per second to 900 ft^{3} (2.5×10^{−8} km^{3}) per second, as recorded at a gauging station 17 mi (27 km) downstream. Debris from the flood was deposited more than 20 mi (32 km) downstream. The GLOF has been attributed to the rapid retreat of the glacier, which has been ongoing since the glacier was first accurately measured in the 1960s.

== See also ==
- List of glaciers in the United States
