= Downs Glacier =

Glacier in Wyoming, United States

- Location within Wyoming
- Type: Mountain glacier
- Location: Fremont County, Wyoming, USA
- Coordinates: 43°17′41″N 109°39′49″W
- Area: 155 acres (63 ha)
- Length: .70 mi (1.13 km)
- Width: .35 mi (0.56 km)
- Terminus: moraine
- Status: unknown

Downs Glacier is located in Shoshone National Forest, in the U.S. state of Wyoming on the east of the Continental Divide in the Wind River Range. The glacier is 1 mi (1.6 km) south of Downs Mountain and sits at an elevation of between 12,600 and 11,200 ft (3,800 and 3,400 m). Downs Glacier is one of many glaciers found in the Fitzpatrick Wilderness, and is part of the largest grouping of glaciers in the American Rocky Mountains.

== See also ==
- List of glaciers in the United States
