= Douglas Glacier (Washington) =

Glacier in the state of Washington

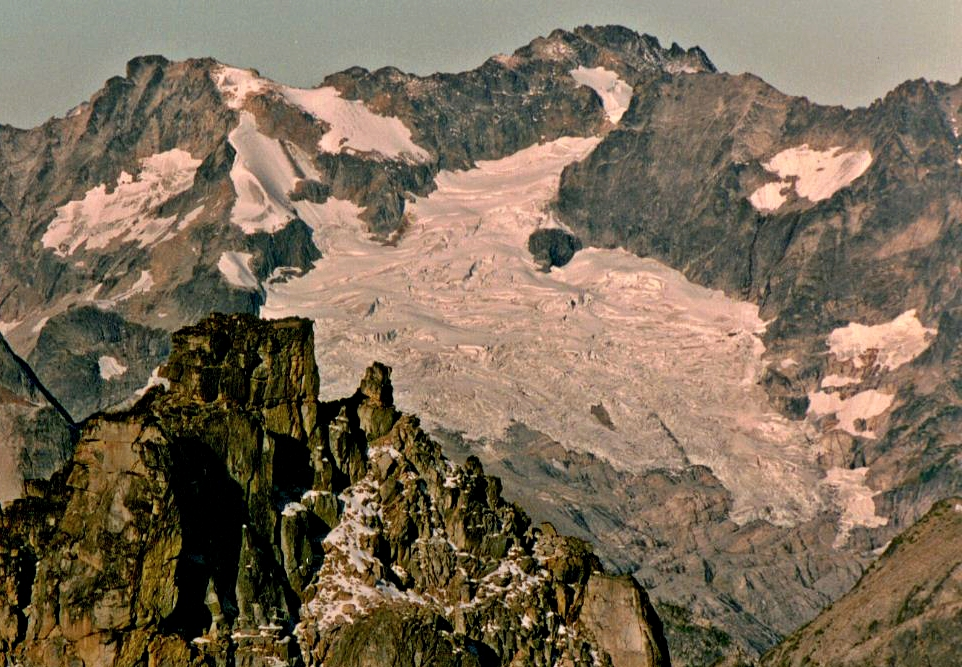

- Location within Washington (state)
- Type: Mountain glacier
- Location: North Cascades National Park, Skagit County, Washington, United States
- Coordinates: 48°31′52″N 120°56′03″W
- Length: .75 mi (1.21 km)
- Terminus: Icefall
- Status: Retreating

Douglas Glacier is located on the southeast slopes of Mount Logan, North Cascades National Park in the U.S. state of Washington. The glacier is approximately .75 mi (1.21 km) long but over 1.5 mi (2.4 km) wide and flows down from just east of the summit of Mount Logan to an elevation of approximately 6,400 ft (2,000 m) where it terminates in an icefall and on barren ground.

== See also ==
- List of glaciers in the United States
