= Klondike Glacier =

Glacier in Wyoming, United States

- Location within Wyoming
- Type: Mountain glacier
- Location: Fremont County, Wyoming, USA
- Coordinates: 43°13′26″N 109°39′59″W
- Length: .20 mi (0.32 km)
- Terminus: proglacial lake
- Status: unknown

Klondike Glacier is in Shoshone National Forest, in the U.S. state of Wyoming on the east of the Continental Divide in the Wind River Range. Klondike Glacier is in the Fitzpatrick Wilderness, and descends from the northeastern slopes of Pedestal Peak. The glacier flows east into a proglacial lake and shares a glacial margin with Grasshopper Glacier to the north.

== See also ==
- List of glaciers in the United States
