= Continental Glacier =

Mountain glacier in Wyoming

- Location within Wyoming
- Type: Mountain glacier
- Location: Fremont / Sublette counties, Wyoming, USA
- Coordinates: 43°19′54″N 109°41′26″W
- Area: 1,025 acres (415 ha)
- Length: .50 mi (0.80 km)
- Width: 3.2 mi (5.1 km)
- Terminus: moraines/proglacial lake
- Status: unknown

Continental Glacier is in Bridger-Teton and Shoshone National Forests, in the U.S. state of Wyoming and straddles the Continental Divide in the northern Wind River Range. Continental Glacier is in both the Bridger and Fitzpatrick Wildernesses, and is part of the largest grouping of glaciers in the American Rocky Mountains. Continental Glacier is situated at an elevation range of 13,100 to 11,200 feet (4,000 to 3,400 m) and forms a nearly unbroken icefield over 3 miles (4.8 km) in length along a high altitude plateau to the north of Downs Mountain. Immediately east of Continental Glacier lies East Torrey Glacier.

== Climate ==
Climate data for Continental Glacier 43.3184 N, 109.6867 W, Elevation: 13,048 ft (3,977 m) (19
Month	Jan	Feb	Mar	Apr	May	Jun	Jul	Aug	Sep	Oct	Nov	Dec	Year
Mean daily maximum °F	—	—	—	—	—	47.1	56.6	55.5	46.9	34.7	23.2	17.2	—
Daily mean °F	7.8	6.3	10.7	15.3	24.1	34.2	42.7	41.7	33.9	23.2	13.6	7.6	21.8
Mean daily minimum °F	−2.0	−4.3	−0.4	3.6	12.1	21.4	28.8	27.9	20.8	11.6	4.0	−1.9	10.1
Average precipitation inches	3.59	3.76	4.31	—	—	—	—	—	—	—	—	—	—
Mean daily maximum °C	—	—	—	—	—	8.4	13.7	13.1	8.3	1.5	−4.9	−8.2	—
Daily mean °C	−13.4	−14.3	−11.8	−9.3	−4.4	1.2	5.9	5.4	1.1	−4.9	−10.2	−13.6	−5.7
Mean daily minimum °C	−18.9	−20.2	−18.0	−15.8	−11.1	−5.9	−1.8	−2.3	−6.2	−11.3	−15.6	−18.8	−12.2
Average precipitation mm	91	96	109	—	—	—	—	—	—	—	—	—	—
Source: PRISM Climate Group

== See also ==
- List of glaciers in the United States
