= Gannett Peak =

Mountain in Wyoming, United States

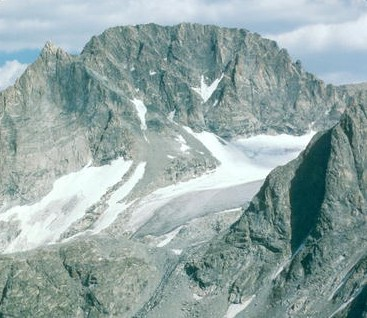
- West face of Gannett Peak

Highest point
- Elevation: 13,810 ft (4,210 m)
- Prominence: 7,076 ft (2,157 m)
- Parent peak: Longs Peak
- Isolation: 290.36 mi (467.29 km)
- Listing: North America highest peaks 75th; North America prominent peaks 74th; North America isolated peaks 38th; US highest major peaks 57th; U.S. state high points 5th
- Coordinates: 43°11′03″N 109°39′15″W

Geography
- Location within Wyoming
- Location: Fremont and Sublette Counties, Wyoming, United States
- Parent range: Wind River Range
- Topo map: USGS Gannett Peak

Climbing
- First ascent: 1922 by A. Tate and F. Stahlnaker
- Easiest route: rock/ice climb

Gannett Peak is the highest mountain peak in the U.S. state of Wyoming at 13,810 ft (4,210 m). It lies in the Wind River Range within the Bridger Wilderness of the Bridger-Teton National Forest. Straddling the Continental Divide along the boundary between Fremont and Sublette counties, it has the second greatest topographic prominence in the state (7,076 ft; 2,157 m) after Cloud Peak (7,077 ft; 2,157 m), and is the highest ground for 290.36 mi (467.29 km) in any direction.

== Overview ==
Geographically, Gannett Peak is the highest point in the Central Rockies, the largely continuous chain of mountains occupying the states of Wyoming, Idaho, and Montana. Named in 1906 for American geographer Henry Gannett, the peak is also the high point of the Wind River Range. The mountain slopes are located in both Bridger-Teton National Forest and Shoshone National Forest.

Gannett is the highest peak within what is better known as the Greater Yellowstone Ecosystem and is the highest peak in the Rocky Mountains outside of Colorado. The 896-acre (363 ha) Gannett Glacier, which is likely the largest single glacier in the American portion of the Rocky Mountains, extends across the northern slopes of the mountain. Minor Glacier is situated in the western cirque of the peak while Dinwoody and Gooseneck Glaciers can be found on the southeast side of the mountain.

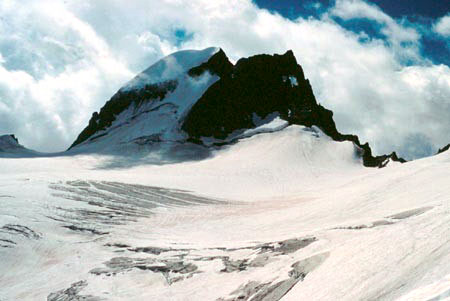
Gannett Glacier on the north side of the peak

Gannett Peak is in the heart of a remote and rugged wilderness. Because of this, its elevation, and extreme weather, it is often considered by mountaineers to be one of the most difficult U.S. state high points to reach, after Denali and possibly Granite Peak.

== Climate ==
The summit has an ET (tundra) climate, with short, chilly summers and very long, very cold winters. Precipitation (mostly snow) is moderate year-round, but the wettest month is April.

Climate data for Gannett Peak 43.1816 N, 109.6583 W, Elevation: 12,776 ft (3,894 m) (1991–2020 normals)
Month	Jan	Feb	Mar	Apr	May	Jun	Jul	Aug	Sep	Oct	Nov	Dec	Year
Mean daily maximum °F (°C)	18.2 (−7.7)	17.6 (−8.0)	23.1 (−4.9)	28.8 (−1.8)	37.7 (3.2)	48.2 (9.0)	57.8 (14.3)	56.6 (13.7)	47.9 (8.8)	35.5 (1.9)	23.9 (−4.5)	17.6 (−8.0)	34.4 (1.3)
Daily mean °F (°C)	8.7 (−12.9)	7.4 (−13.7)	12.2 (−11.0)	17.1 (−8.3)	25.9 (−3.4)	35.7 (2.1)	44.3 (6.8)	43.2 (6.2)	35.3 (1.8)	24.4 (−4.2)	14.6 (−9.7)	8.4 (−13.1)	23.1 (−5.0)
Mean daily minimum °F (°C)	−0.8 (−18.2)	−2.8 (−19.3)	1.3 (−17.1)	5.5 (−14.7)	14.0 (−10.0)	23.2 (−4.9)	30.8 (−0.7)	29.8 (−1.2)	22.7 (−5.2)	13.4 (−10.3)	5.3 (−14.8)	−0.7 (−18.2)	11.8 (−11.2)
Average precipitation inches (mm)	2.97 (75)	3.04 (77)	3.87 (98)	5.59 (142)	4.36 (111)	3.07 (78)	2.11 (54)	2.10 (53)	3.27 (83)	3.94 (100)	3.00 (76)	2.84 (72)	40.16 (1,019)
Source: PRISM Climate Group

== Hazards ==
Encountering bears is a concern in the Wind River Range. There are other concerns as well, including bugs, wildfires, adverse snow conditions and nighttime cold temperatures.

Importantly, there have been notable incidents, including accidental deaths, due to falls from steep cliffs (a misstep could be fatal in this class 4/5 terrain) and due to falling rocks, over the years, including 1993, 2007 (involving an experienced NOLS leader), 2011, 2015 and 2018. Other incidents include a seriously injured backpacker being airlifted near SquareTop Mountain in 2005, and a fatal hiker incident (from an apparent accidental fall) in 2006 that involved state search and rescue. The U.S. Forest Service does not offer updated aggregated records on the official number of fatalities in the Wind River Range.

== See also ==
- List of mountain peaks of the United States
- List of Ultras of the United States
