= Downs Mountain =

Mountain in the American state of Wyoming

- Location within Wyoming Location within the United States

Highest point
- Elevation: 13,355 ft (4,071 m)
- Prominence: 1,549 ft (472 m)
- Coordinates: 43°18′36″N 109°40′21″W

Geography
- Location: Fremont / Sublette counties, Wyoming, U.S.
- Parent range: Wind River Range
- Topo map: USGS Downs Mountain

Geology
- Mountain type: Batholith

Downs Mountain (13,355 ft (4,071 m)) is located in the Wind River Range in the U.S. state of Wyoming. Downs Mountain is the 15th highest peak in Wyoming. The summit is on the Continental Divide in both Shoshone and Bridger-Teton National Forests. The East Torrey Glacier is on the northern slopes of Downs Mountain, while Continental Glacier lies to the west and north and the Downs Glacier is 1 mi (1.6 km) to the south.

== Climate ==
Climate data for Downs Mountain 43.3086 N, 109.6748 W, Elevation: 13,064 ft (3,982 m) (1991–2020 normals)
Month	Jan	Feb	Mar	Apr	May	Jun	Jul	Aug	Sep	Oct	Nov	Dec	Year
Mean daily maximum °F (°C)	17.6 (−8.0)	16.7 (−8.5)	21.8 (−5.7)	27.3 (−2.6)	36.2 (2.3)	46.9 (8.3)	56.4 (13.6)	55.2 (12.9)	46.7 (8.2)	34.6 (1.4)	23.2 (−4.9)	17.1 (−8.3)	33.3 (0.7)
Daily mean °F (°C)	8.0 (−13.3)	6.5 (−14.2)	11.0 (−11.7)	15.7 (−9.1)	24.4 (−4.2)	34.4 (1.3)	42.8 (6.0)	41.8 (5.4)	34.0 (1.1)	23.4 (−4.8)	14.0 (−10.0)	7.9 (−13.4)	22.0 (−5.6)
Mean daily minimum °F (°C)	−1.5 (−18.6)	−3.7 (−19.8)	0.2 (−17.7)	4.1 (−15.5)	12.6 (−10.8)	21.9 (−5.6)	29.2 (−1.6)	28.4 (−2.0)	21.3 (−5.9)	12.1 (−11.1)	4.7 (−15.2)	−1.3 (−18.5)	10.7 (−11.9)
Average precipitation inches (mm)	3.78 (96)	3.93 (100)	4.15 (105)	5.62 (143)	4.84 (123)	2.98 (76)	1.94 (49)	2.02 (51)	2.88 (73)	3.37 (86)	3.48 (88)	3.86 (98)	42.85 (1,088)
Source: PRISM Climate Group

== Hazards ==
Encountering bears is a concern in the Wind River Range. There are other concerns as well, including bugs, wildfires, adverse snow conditions and nighttime cold temperatures.

Importantly, there have been notable incidents, including accidental deaths, due to falls from steep cliffs (a misstep could be fatal in this class 4/5 terrain) and due to falling rocks, over the years, including 1993, 2007 (involving an experienced NOLS leader), 2015 and 2018. Other incidents include a seriously injured backpacker being airlifted near SquareTop Mountain in 2005, and a fatal hiker incident (from an apparent accidental fall) in 2006 that involved state search and rescue. The U.S. Forest Service does not offer updated aggregated records on the official number of fatalities in the Wind River Range.
