= East Torrey Glacier =

Glacier in Wyoming, United States

- Location within Wyoming
- Type: Mountain glacier
- Location: Fremont County, Wyoming, USA
- Coordinates: 43°19′00″N 109°40′20″W
- Area: 500 acres (200 ha)
- Length: .70 miles (1.13 km)
- Width: 1.15 mi (1.85 km)
- Terminus: moraines/proglacial lake
- Status: retreating

East Torrey Glacier is located in Shoshone National Forest, in the U.S. state of Wyoming on the east side of the Continental Divide in the northern Wind River Range. Situated in the Fitzpatrick Wilderness, East Torrey Glacier is part of the largest grouping of glaciers in the American Rocky Mountains and is immediately east of Continental Glacier and north of Downs Mountain. The glacier has three separate lobes and has retreated well above two proglacial lakes.

== See also ==
- List of glaciers in the United States
