= Minor Glacier =

Glacier in the state of Wyoming

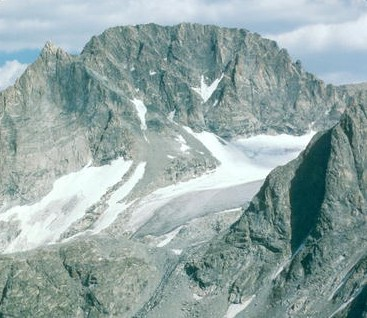
- Minor Glacier can be seen at center right, below the west flank of Gannett Peak

- Location within Wyoming
- Type: Mountain glacier
- Location: Sublette County, Wyoming, USA
- Coordinates: 43°11′12″N 109°39′45″W
- Length: .45 mi (0.72 km)
- Terminus: Talus
- Status: Retreating

Minor Glacier is in Bridger-Teton National Forest, in the U.S. state of Wyoming on the west side of the Continental Divide in the northern Wind River Range. Minor Glacier is in the Bridger Wilderness and is part of the largest grouping of glaciers in the American Rocky Mountains. The glacier is situated below the west flank of Gannett Peak, the tallest mountain in Wyoming.

== See also ==
- List of glaciers in the United States
