= Upper Fremont Glacier =

Glacier in Wyoming, United States

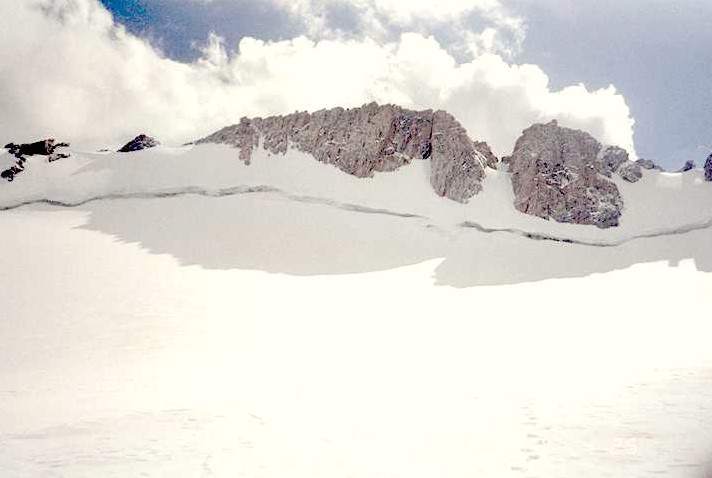
- Upper Fremont Glacier on the north ridge of Fremont Peak

- Location within Wyoming
- Type: Mountain glacier
- Location: Fremont County, Wyoming, USA
- Coordinates: 43°07′52″N 109°36′58″W
- Area: 690 acres (2.8 km^{2}) (in 1990)
- Length: 1.35 mi (2.17 km)
- Thickness: 538 ft (164 m) (in 1998)
- Terminus: Moraines
- Status: Retreating

Upper Fremont Glacier is in the Fitzpatrick Wilderness of Shoshone National Forest in the U.S. state of Wyoming. This Wind River Range alpine glacier is associated with the largest grouping of glaciers in the U.S. Rocky Mountains and lies on the north slope of Fremont Peak, the third tallest mountain in Wyoming. Upper Fremont Glacier is at an average altitude of 13,450 ft (4,100 m) and is one of the highest altitude glaciers in the American Rockies.

Ice core samples were taken from Upper Fremont Glacier in 1990-1991. These ice cores were analyzed for climatic changes as well as alterations of atmospheric chemicals. In 1998 an unbroken ice core sample of 538 ft (164 m) was taken from the glacier and subsequent analysis of the ice showed an abrupt change in the oxygen isotope ratio oxygen-18 to oxygen-16 in conjunction with what is widely regarded as the end of the Little Ice Age, a period of cooler global temperatures between the years 1550 and 1850. A linkage was established with a similar ice core study which had been undertaken on the Quelccaya Ice Cap in Peru, which also demonstrated the same changes in the oxygen isotope ratio during the same period. The climatic implications from the ice cores taken from both sites support evidence of a sudden global climate change during the mid 19th century.

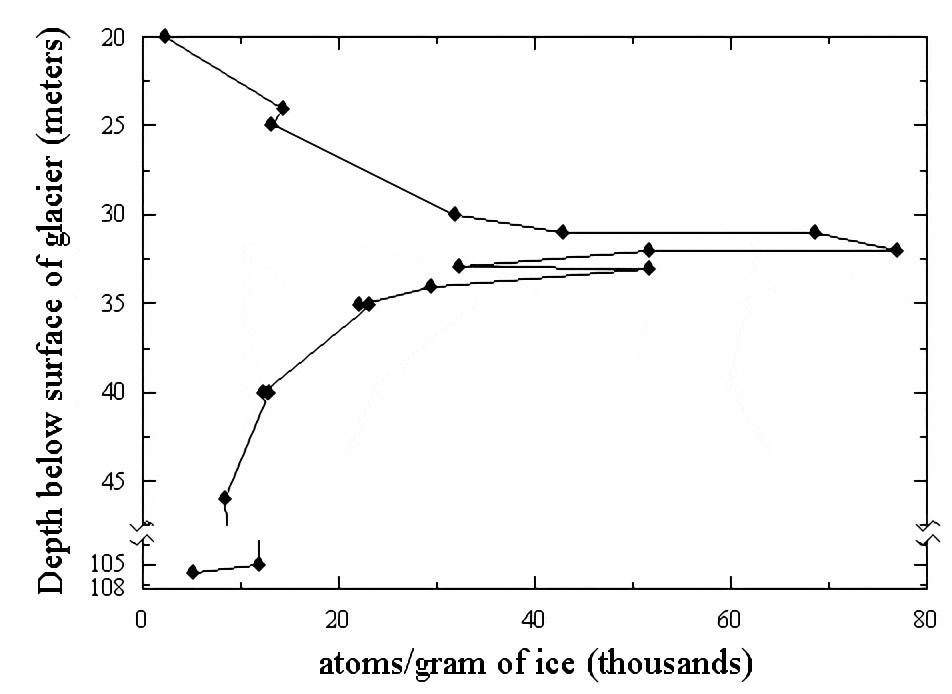
The Upper Fremont Glacier ice core showed a spike in ^{36}Cl from 1960s nuclear testing.

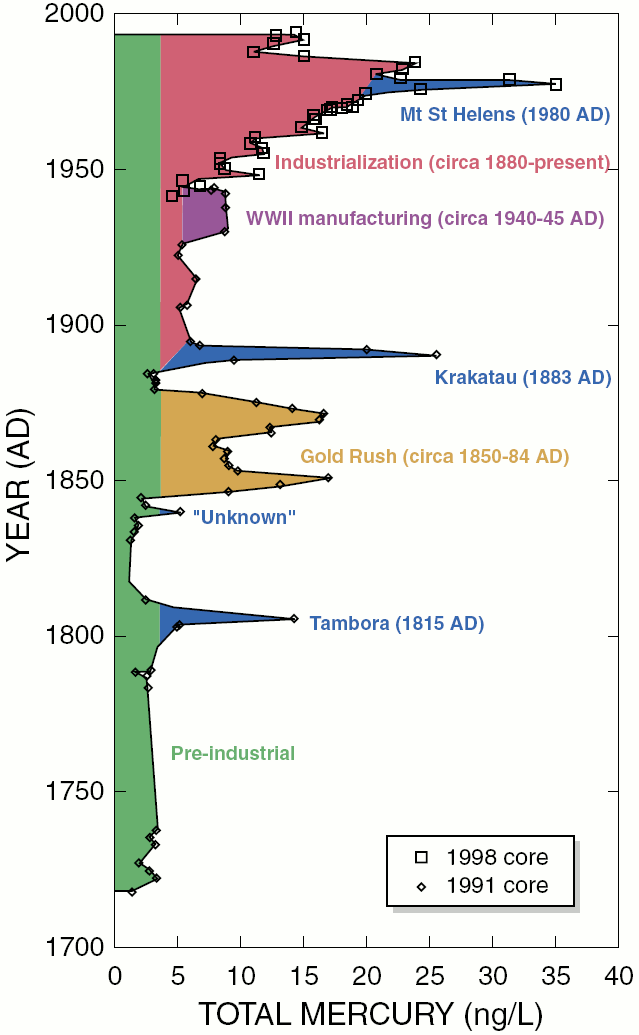
Amount of atmospheric mercury deposited at Wyoming's Upper Fremont Glacier over the last 270 years

Ice cores from the glacier also showed increased levels of Tritium (^{3}H) and chlorine-36 around the year 1963, which coincides with the peak period of above ground nuclear testing.

The same ice cores were also tested for mercury deposition from natural and human-induced activities. This is the first known instance in which ice cores have been used to determine mercury deposition from a mid-latitude glacier in North America, as all previous studies have been derived from other sources. The majority of mercury deposition is by way of the atmosphere and sources of the element may be from volcanic activity or from industrialization, but volcanoes are believed to contribute a small proportion of the mercury. The ice core samples from the Upper Fremont Glacier indicated that levels of mercury increased dramatically during the Industrial Revolution and have decreased significantly since the mid-1980s. It is believed that the decrease in mercury deposition since the 1980s coincides with the passage of the Clean Air Act.

== See also ==
- List of glaciers in the United States
