= Gannett Glacier =

Glacier in Wyoming, United States

Gannet glacier
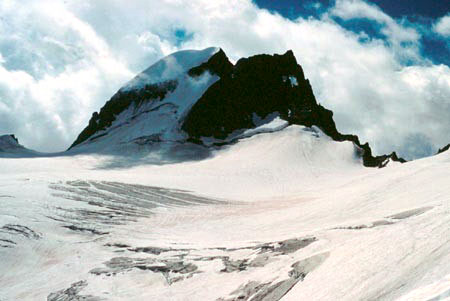
- Gannett Glacier on the north slope of Gannett Peak

- Location within Wyoming
- Type: Mountain glacier
- Location: Fremont County, Wyoming, USA
- Coordinates: 43°11′45″N 109°38′44″W
- Area: 3.63 square kilometres (897 acres) (in 1999)
- Terminus: Moraine
- Status: Retreating

Gannett Glacier is the largest glacier in the Rocky Mountains within the United States. The glacier is located on the east and north slopes of Gannett Peak, the highest mountain in Wyoming, on the east side of the Continental Divide in the Wind River Range. Gannett is but one of dozens of glaciers located in the Fitzpatrick Wilderness of Shoshone National Forest.

Like many glaciers around the world, Gannett Glacier is slowly disappearing. Photographic evidence clearly demonstrates that there has been an enormous reduction in the area of the glacier since the 1920s. The estimated area of the glacier in 1950 was 4.6 square kilometres (1,137 acres) and was measured in 1999 to be 3.63 square kilometres (897 acres). Measurements from 1958 and 1983 showed a depth reduction of 18.6 metres (61 ft) over 25 years. A general warming pattern and a reduction in moisture is widely believed to be the reason for the glacier retreating. Numerous other glaciers are located nearby, including six more that rank among the top ten largest in the U.S. Rocky Mountains.

In a 1989 study, both Gannett and Dinwoody glaciers were researched to determine the amount of melt water they supplied to streams. Both glaciers supply melt water which flows into Dinwoody Creek, which in turn flows into the Wind River. The melt water was found to have contributed increasingly lower amounts to the total water supplied to Dinwoody Creek. This has been attributed to the glaciers thinning and retreating, especially since 1950, when Gannett Glacier was measured to be almost 20 percent larger than in 1999. The impact on reduced stream flow from Gannett Glacier due to glacial retreat affects more than just the amount of water available for the local ecosystem and downstream agricultural and ranching interests.

== See also ==
- List of glaciers in the United States
