= Dinwoody Glacier =

Glacier in Wyoming, United States

- Location within Wyoming
- Type: Mountain glacier
- Location: Fremont County, Wyoming, USA
- Coordinates: 43°10′24″N 109°38′19″W
- Area: 9 km^{2} (2,200 acres) (in 1950)
- Length: 3.5 km (2.2 mi)
- Thickness: 111 m (364 ft) (1989 max)
- Terminus: moraine/talus
- Status: retreating

Dinwoody Glacier is located in Shoshone National Forest, in the U.S. state of Wyoming on the east side of the Continental Divide in the Wind River Range. Completely within the Fitzpatrick Wilderness, Dinwoody Glacier is one of the largest glaciers in the American Rocky Mountains, and as of 1989 was ranked fourth in area. In a 1989 study which examined repeat photography and stream flow analysis, Dinwoody Glacier was determined to have retreated rapidly between 1958 and 1983, though most of the reduction has been in the thickness of the glacier rather than its surface area. In the same 25-year period, the glacier lost an average of 23.4 m (77 ft) in thickness. Radar mapping of 72 locations on the glacier resulted in an average thickness of 54 m (177 ft) and a maximum measured depth of 111 m (364 ft). The 1989 study was commenced to examine the impact on water supplies to streams and rivers from glacier retreat of both Dinwoody and Gannett Glaciers.

== See also ==
- List of glaciers in the United States
