= Harrower Peak =

Mountain in the country of the United States

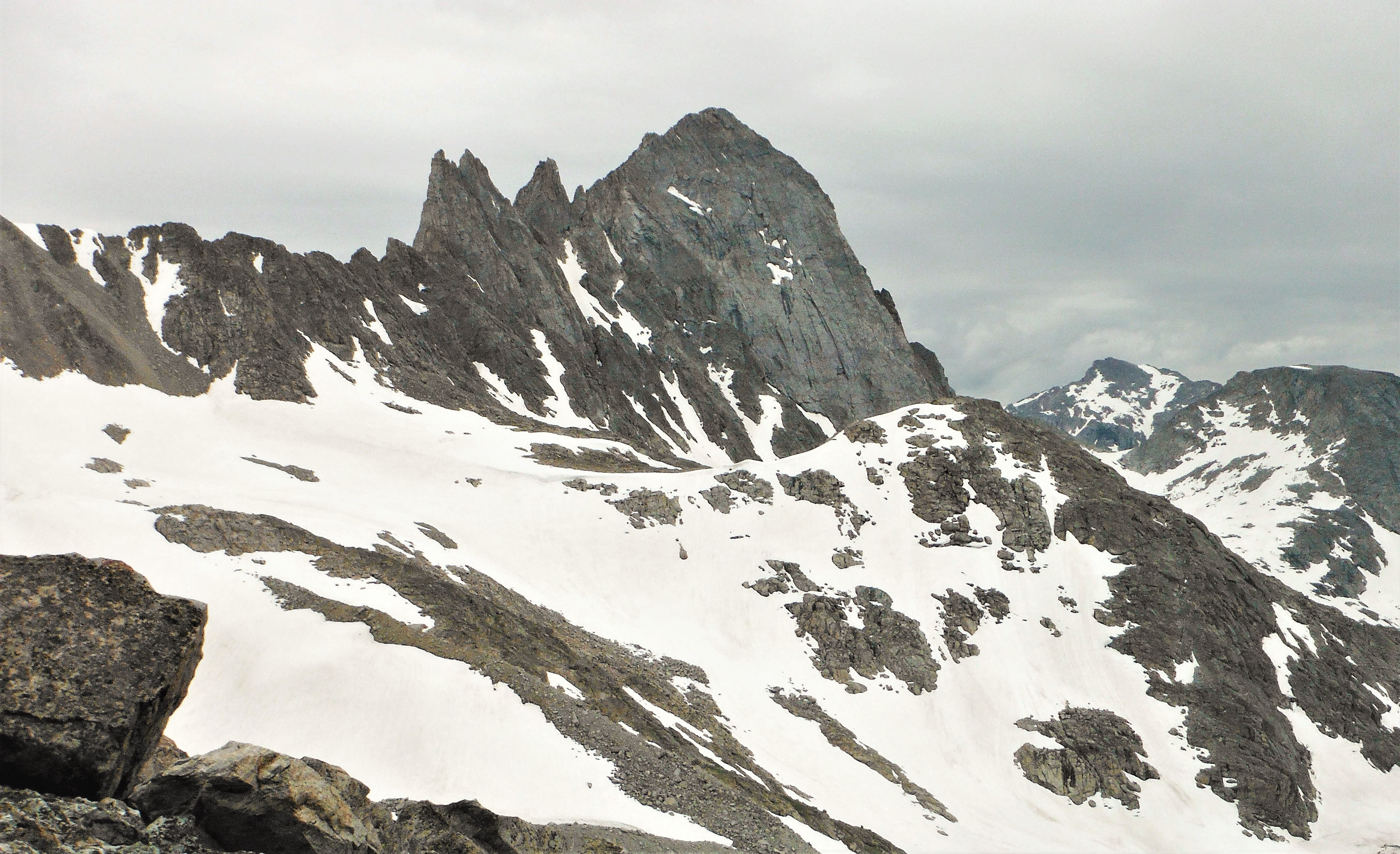
- North aspect

Highest point
- Elevation: 13,057 ft (3,980 m)
- Prominence: 932 ft (284 m)
- Coordinates: 43°05′37″N 109°35′45″W

Geography
- Location within Wyoming Location within the United States
- Location: Sublette County, Wyoming, U.S.
- Parent range: Wind River Range
- Topo map: USGS Fremont Peak South

Climbing
- First ascent: 1926 (Albert R. Ellingwood)

Harrower Peak (13,057 ft (3,980 m)) is located in the northern Wind River Range in the U.S. state of Wyoming, and it is the 28th tallest mountain in the state. Harrower Peak is in the Bridger Wilderness of Bridger-Teton National Forest and the Harrower Glacier is less than .50 mi (0.80 km) northeast of the peak. Harrower Peak is named after the late James King Harrower of Pinedale, Wyoming, who was a prominent wilderness and wildlife advocate, forest ranger, game warden, and regional historian.

== Hazards ==
Encountering bears is a concern in the Wind River Range. There are other concerns as well, including bugs, wildfires, adverse snow conditions and nighttime cold temperatures.

Importantly, there have been notable incidents, including accidental deaths, due to falls from steep cliffs (a misstep could be fatal in this class 4/5 terrain) and due to falling rocks, over the years, including 1993, 2007 (involving an experienced NOLS leader), 2015 and 2018. Other incidents include a seriously injured backpacker being airlifted near SquareTop Mountain in 2005, and a fatal hiker incident (from an apparent accidental fall) in 2006 that involved state search and rescue. The U.S. Forest Service does not offer updated aggregated records on the official number of fatalities in the Wind River Range.
