= Mount Lester =

Mountain of Sublette County, Wyoming

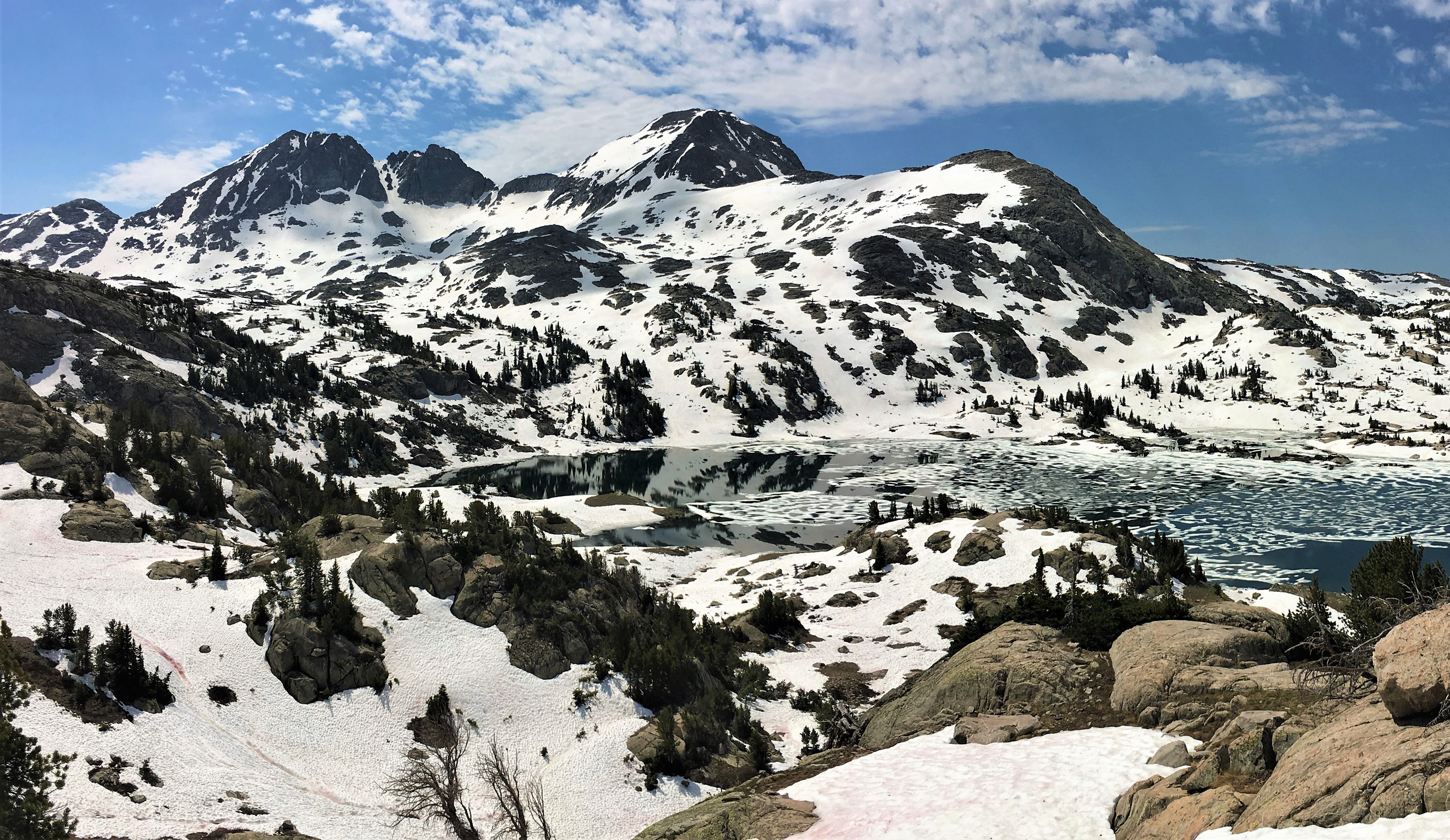
- North aspect, with Island Lake

Highest point
- Elevation: 12,342 ft (3,762 m)
- Prominence: 1,182 ft (360 m)
- Parent peak: Faler Tower (12,607 ft)
- Isolation: 2.18 mi (3.51 km)
- Coordinates: 43°03′57″N 109°37′25″W

Geography
- Location within Wyoming Location within the United States
- Location: Sublette County, Wyoming, U.S.
- Parent range: Rocky Mountains; Wind River Range
- Topo map: USGS Fremont Peak South

Geology
- Rock type: granitic

Climbing
- Easiest route: class 3 scrambling

Mount Lester is a 12,342-foot-elevation (3,762-meter) mountain summit located in Sublette County, Wyoming, United States.

== Description ==
The peak is situated in the remote Wind River Range, which is a subset of the Rocky Mountains. It is set four miles west of the Continental Divide, within the Bridger Wilderness, on land managed by Bridger-Teton National Forest. The nearest town is Pinedale, 21 miles to the southwest. Lester ranks as the 115th-highest peak in Wyoming, and topographic relief is significant as the west aspect rises 2,000 feet (610 meters) in one-half mile. The mountain's toponym, which has been officially adopted by the United States Board on Geographic Names, was in use in 1914 when published in an USGS bulletin.

== Climate ==
According to the Köppen climate classification system, Mount Lester is located in an alpine subarctic climate zone with long, cold, snowy winters, and cool to warm summers. Due to its altitude, it receives precipitation all year, as snow in winter, and as thunderstorms in summer. Precipitation runoff from the mountain drains into tributaries of the Green River.

== Hazards ==
Encountering bears is a concern in the Wind River Range. There are other concerns as well, including bugs, wildfires, adverse snow conditions and nighttime cold temperatures.

Importantly, there have been notable incidents, including accidental deaths, due to falls from steep cliffs (a misstep could be fatal in this class 4/5 terrain) and due to falling rocks, over the years, including 1993, 2007 (involving an experienced NOLS leader), 2015 and 2018. Other incidents include a seriously injured backpacker being airlifted near Squaretop Mountain in 2005, and a fatal hiker incident (from an apparent accidental fall) in 2006 that involved state search and rescue. The U.S. Forest Service does not offer updated aggregated records on the official number of fatalities in the Wind River Range.

== See also ==
- List of mountain peaks of Wyoming
- Lester Ward (USGS geologist)
