= Knife Point Mountain =

Mountain in the state of Wyoming

- Location within Wyoming Location within the United States

Highest point
- Elevation: 13,007 ft (3,965 m)
- Prominence: 641 ft (195 m)
- Coordinates: 43°05′59″N 109°34′37″W

Geography
- Location: Sublette and Fremont County, Wyoming, U.S.
- Parent range: Wind River Range
- Topo map: USGS Fremont Peak South

Climbing
- First ascent: 1926 (Albert R. Ellingwood and Stephen Hart)

Knife Point Mountain (13,007 ft (3,965 m)) is located in the northern Wind River Range in the U.S. state of Wyoming. Situated 2.7 mi (4.3 km) southeast of Fremont Peak, Knife Point Mountain is on the Continental Divide. North of Knife Point Mountain is the origination point of Knife Point Glacier, while Harrower Glacier lies just to the west. Knife Point Mountain is the 32nd tallest peak in Wyoming.

== Hazards ==
Encountering bears is a concern in the Wind River Range. There are other concerns as well, including bugs, wildfires, adverse snow conditions and nighttime cold temperatures.

Importantly, there have been notable incidents, including accidental deaths, due to falls from steep cliffs (a misstep could be fatal in this class 4/5 terrain) and due to falling rocks, over the years, including 1993, 2007 (involving an experienced NOLS leader), 2015 and 2018. Other incidents include a seriously injured backpacker being airlifted near SquareTop Mountain in 2005, and a fatal hiker incident (from an apparent accidental fall) in 2006 that involved state search and rescue. The U.S. Forest Service does not offer updated aggregated records on the official number of fatalities in the Wind River Range.
