= Mount Geikie (Wyoming) =

Mountain in Wyoming, United States

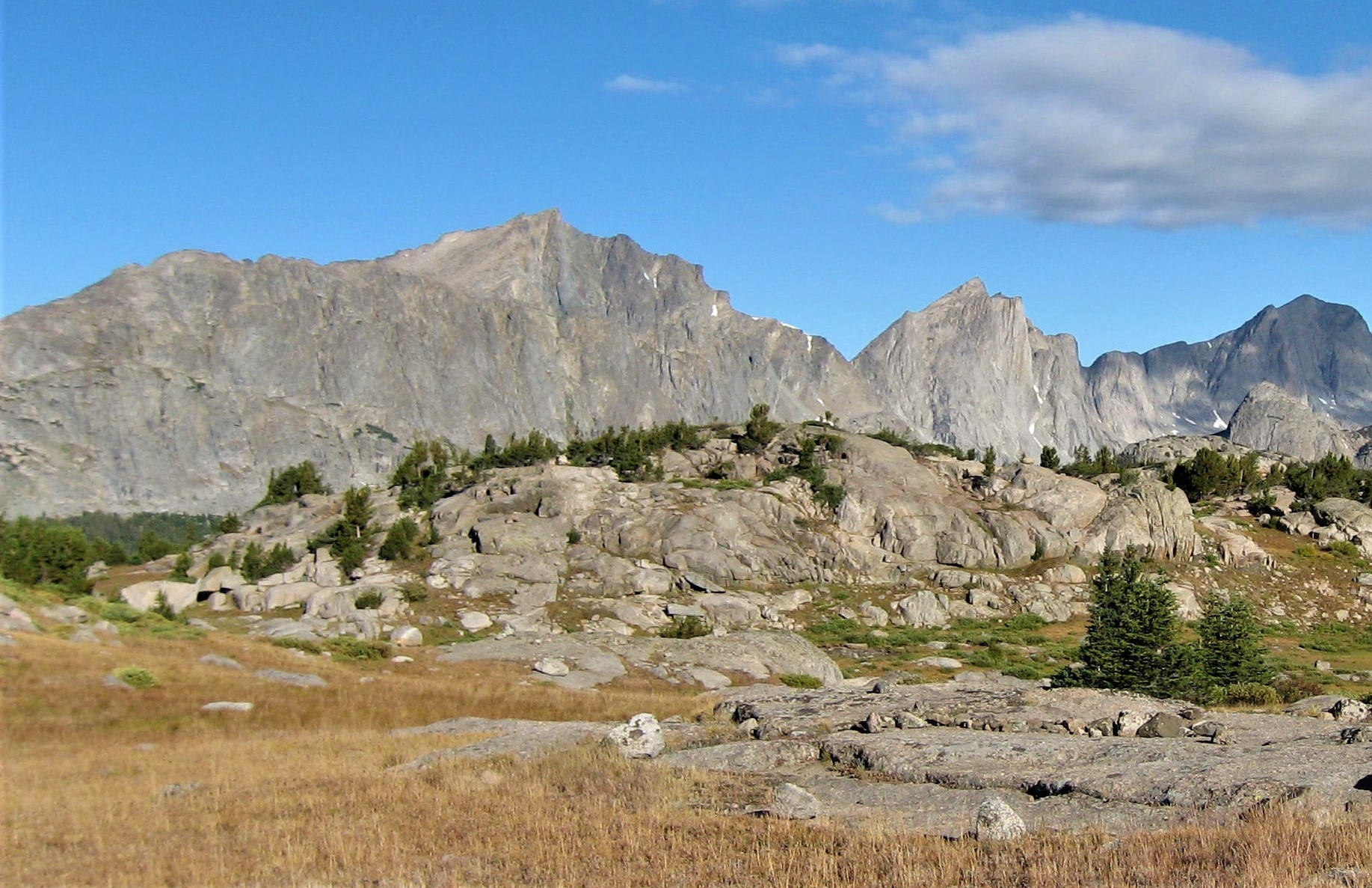
- Southeast aspect, left of center

Highest point
- Elevation: 12,378 ft (3,773 m)
- Prominence: 1,078 ft (329 m)
- Parent peak: Raid Peak (12,537 ft)
- Isolation: 2.08 mi (3.35 km)
- Coordinates: 42°49′44″N 109°19′50″W

Naming
- Etymology: Archibald Geikie

Geography
- Location within Wyoming Location within the United States
- Country: United States
- State: Wyoming
- County: Sublette
- Protected area: Bridger Wilderness
- Parent range: Rocky Mountains; Wind River Range
- Topo map: USGS Mount Bonneville

Geology
- Rock type: granitic

Climbing
- First ascent: 1890 William O. Owen
- Easiest route: class 2 hiking

Mount Geikie is a 12,378-foot-elevation (3,773-meter) mountain summit in Sublette County, Wyoming, United States.

== Description ==
Mount Geikie is located in the remote Wind River Range, which is a subrange of the Rocky Mountains. It is set three miles west of the Continental Divide within the Bridger Wilderness, on land managed by Bridger-Teton National Forest. The nearest town is Pinedale, 26.5 miles (42.6 km) to the west. Geikie ranks as the 113th-highest peak in Wyoming, and topographic relief is significant as the summit rises 2,140 feet (650 meters) above the East Fork River in one-half mile (0.8 km). Precipitation runoff from the mountain drains into East Fork and other tributaries of the Green River.

== Climate ==
According to the Köppen climate classification system, Mount Geikie is located in an alpine subarctic climate zone with long, cold, snowy winters, and cool to warm summers. Due to its altitude, it receives precipitation all year, as snow in winter and as thunderstorms in summer.

== Climbing history ==
The first ascent of the summit was made in 1890 by surveyor William O. Owen. The East Rib was first climbed in 1972 by Steve Bassnett and Nigel Peacock, whereas the south slope was first climbed in 1973 by John Coover, Ward Wickwire, and Eberhard Zeh.

== Etymology ==
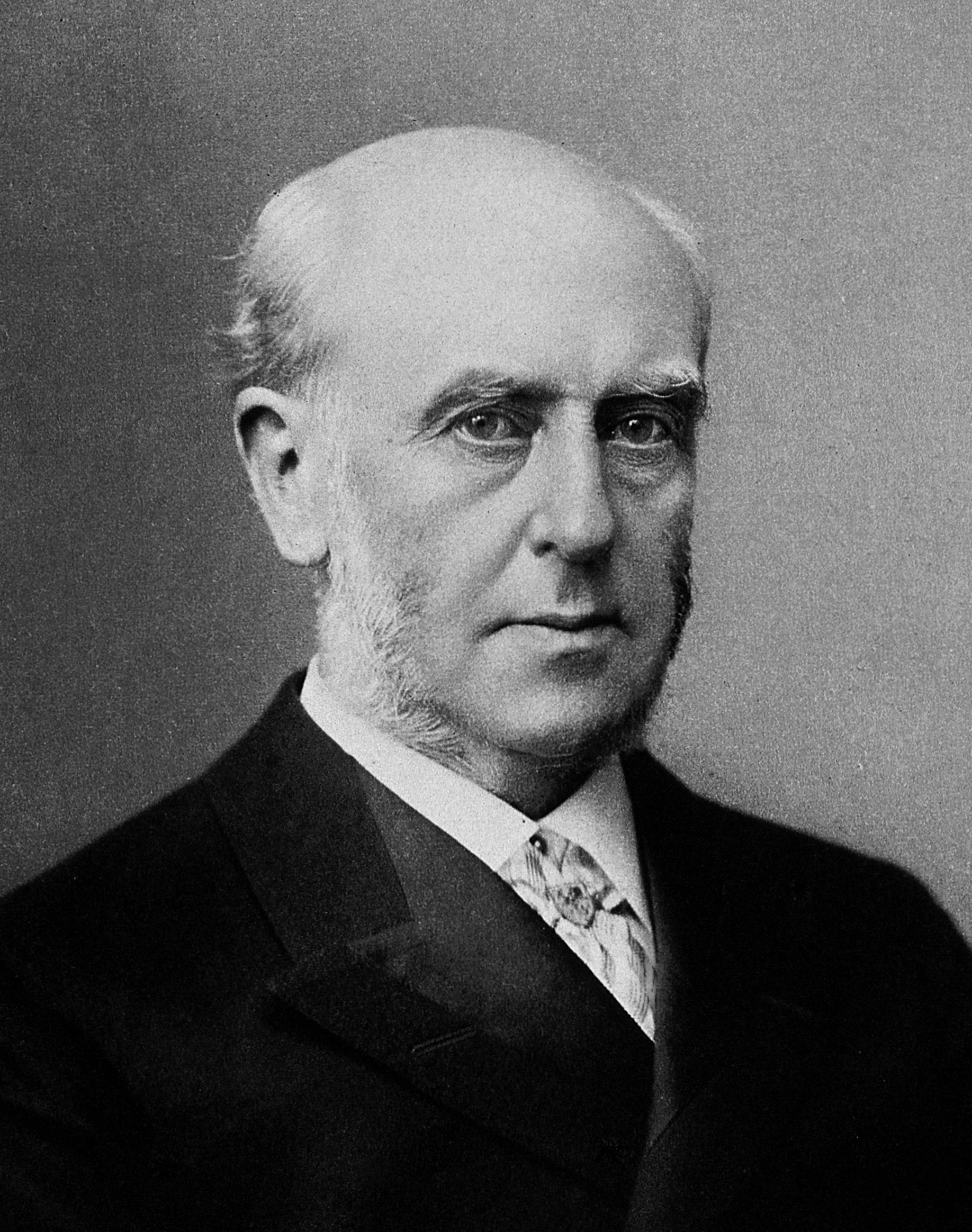
Archibald Geikie

The mountain's toponym has been officially adopted by the United States Board on Geographic Names. The mountain was named in 1900 by the USGS for Sir Archibald Geikie (1835–1924), director general of the Geological Survey of the United Kingdom.

== Hazards ==
Encountering bears is a concern in the Wind River Range. There are other concerns as well, including bugs, wildfires, adverse snow conditions and nighttime cold temperatures.

Importantly, there have been notable incidents, including accidental deaths, due to falls from steep cliffs (a misstep could be fatal in this class 4/5 terrain) and due to falling rocks, over the years, including 1993, 2007 (involving an experienced NOLS leader), 2015 and 2018. Other incidents include a seriously injured backpacker being airlifted near Squaretop Mountain in 2005, and a fatal hiker incident (from an apparent accidental fall) in 2006 that involved state search and rescue. The U.S. Forest Service does not offer updated aggregated records on the official number of fatalities in the Wind River Range.

== See also ==
- List of mountain peaks of Wyoming
- Mountains of Sublette County, Wyoming
