= Bow Mountain =

Mountain in Wyoming, United States

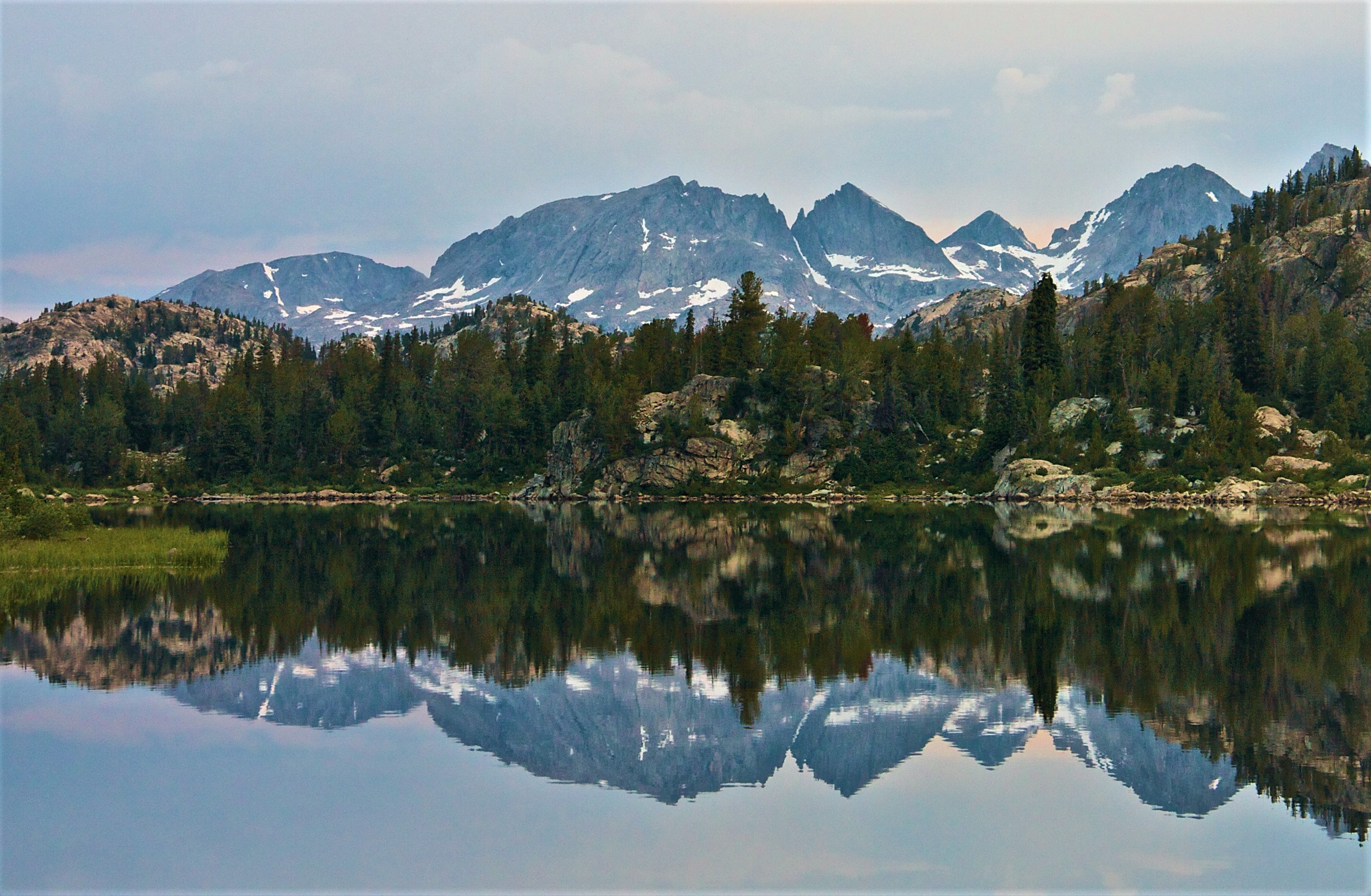
- South aspect, centered

Highest point
- Elevation: 13,025 ft (3,970 m)
- Prominence: 660 ft (200 m)
- Coordinates: 43°08′39″N 109°41′02″W

Geography
- Location within Wyoming Location within the United States
- Location: Sublette County, Wyoming, U.S.
- Parent range: Wind River Range
- Topo map: USGS Gannett Peak

Climbing
- First ascent: 1939 (David Bigelow, Alexander Klots and Anthony Ladd)
- Easiest route: Scramble

Bow Mountain (13,025 ft (3,970 m)) is located in the northern Wind River Range in the U.S. state of Wyoming. Situated 1 mi (1.6 km) west of American Legion Peak, Bow Mountain is in the Bridger Wilderness of Bridger-Teton National Forest. Stroud Glacier lies just to the north of the peak. Bow Mountain is the 29th tallest peak in Wyoming.

== Hazards ==
Encountering bears is a concern in the Wind River Range. There are other concerns as well, including bugs, wildfires, adverse snow conditions and nighttime cold temperatures.

Importantly, there have been notable incidents, including accidental deaths, due to falls from steep cliffs (a misstep could be fatal in this class 4/5 terrain) and due to falling rocks, over the years, including 1993, 2007 (involving an experienced NOLS leader), 2015 and 2018. Other incidents include a seriously injured backpacker being airlifted near SquareTop Mountain in 2005, and a fatal hiker incident (from an apparent accidental fall) in 2006 that involved state search and rescue. The U.S. Forest Service does not offer updated aggregated records on the official number of fatalities in the Wind River Range.
