= Raid Peak =

Mountain in Wyoming, United States

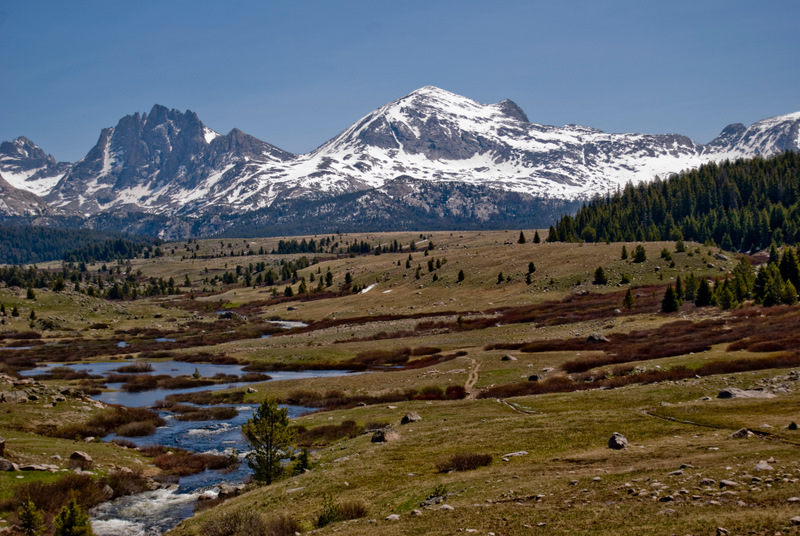
- Viewed from Bonneville Basin, Raid Peak is at center and jagged Mount Bonneville is at left.

Highest point
- Elevation: 12,537 ft (3,821 m)
- Prominence: 852 ft (260 m)
- Coordinates: 42°51′37″N 109°20′34″W

Geography
- Location within Wyoming Location within the United States
- Location: Sublette County, Wyoming, U.S.
- Parent range: Wind River Range
- Topo map: USGS Mount Bonneville

Climbing
- Easiest route: Scramble, but east face class 5.8

Raid Peak (12,537 feet (3,821 m)) is located in the Wind River Range in the U.S. state of Wyoming. The mountain is in the Bridger Wilderness of Bridger-Teton National Forest, 1.25 mi (2.01 km) west of the Continental Divide and .85 mi (1.37 km) south of Mount Bonneville. The east face of Raid Peak has one of the most spectacular cliff faces in the Wind River Range, rising almost 2,000 ft (610 m) above an unnamed lake with 1,700 ft (520 m) of that being a nearly sheer wall which is rated at class 5.8 and Grade IV-V. Most ascents up this face take at least a day if not two days.

== Hazards ==
Encountering bears is a concern in the Wind River Range. There are other concerns as well, including bugs, wildfires, adverse snow conditions and nighttime cold temperatures.

Importantly, there have been notable incidents, including accidental deaths, due to falls from steep cliffs (a misstep could be fatal in this class 4/5 terrain) and due to falling rocks, over the years, including 1993, 2007 (involving an experienced NOLS leader), 2015 and 2018. Other incidents include a seriously injured backpacker being airlifted near SquareTop Mountain in 2005, and a fatal hiker incident (from an apparent accidental fall) in 2006 that involved state search and rescue. The U.S. Forest Service does not offer updated aggregated records on the official number of fatalities in the Wind River Range.
