= KPIN =

- Pinedale, Wyoming; United States
- Frequency: 101.1 MHz
- Branding: K-Pine

Programming
- Format: Country

Ownership
- Owner: Robert R. Rule

History
- First air date: 1996

Technical information
- Licensing authority: FCC
- Facility ID: 77275
- Class: C3
- ERP: 4,000 watts
- HAAT: 145.0 meters (475.7 ft)
- Transmitter coordinates: 42°50′39″N 109°55′23″W

Links
- Public license information: Public file; LMS
- Website: kpinfm.com

KPIN (101.1 FM) is a radio station broadcasting a country music format. Licensed to Pinedale, Wyoming, United States, the station serves the Pinedale area. As of 2013, the station is owned by Robert R. Rule.

== Signal ==
KPIN's signal covers almost all of Sublette County, and parts of northern Sweetwater County. Since Pinedale is located at the base of the southern flank of the Wind River Range, and due to the line-of-sight propagation of FM, the signal begins to get choppy to the north, the further one travels into the mountain range. Those skiing at nearby White Pine Ski Resort, about seven miles north of Pinedale, will notice the signal fading as they travel closer to the ski resort.

The transmitter is located on a small hill directly southwest of town, along with several FM translator stations and the tower for KUWX 90.9 FM.
