= American Legion Peak =

Mountain in Wyoming, United States

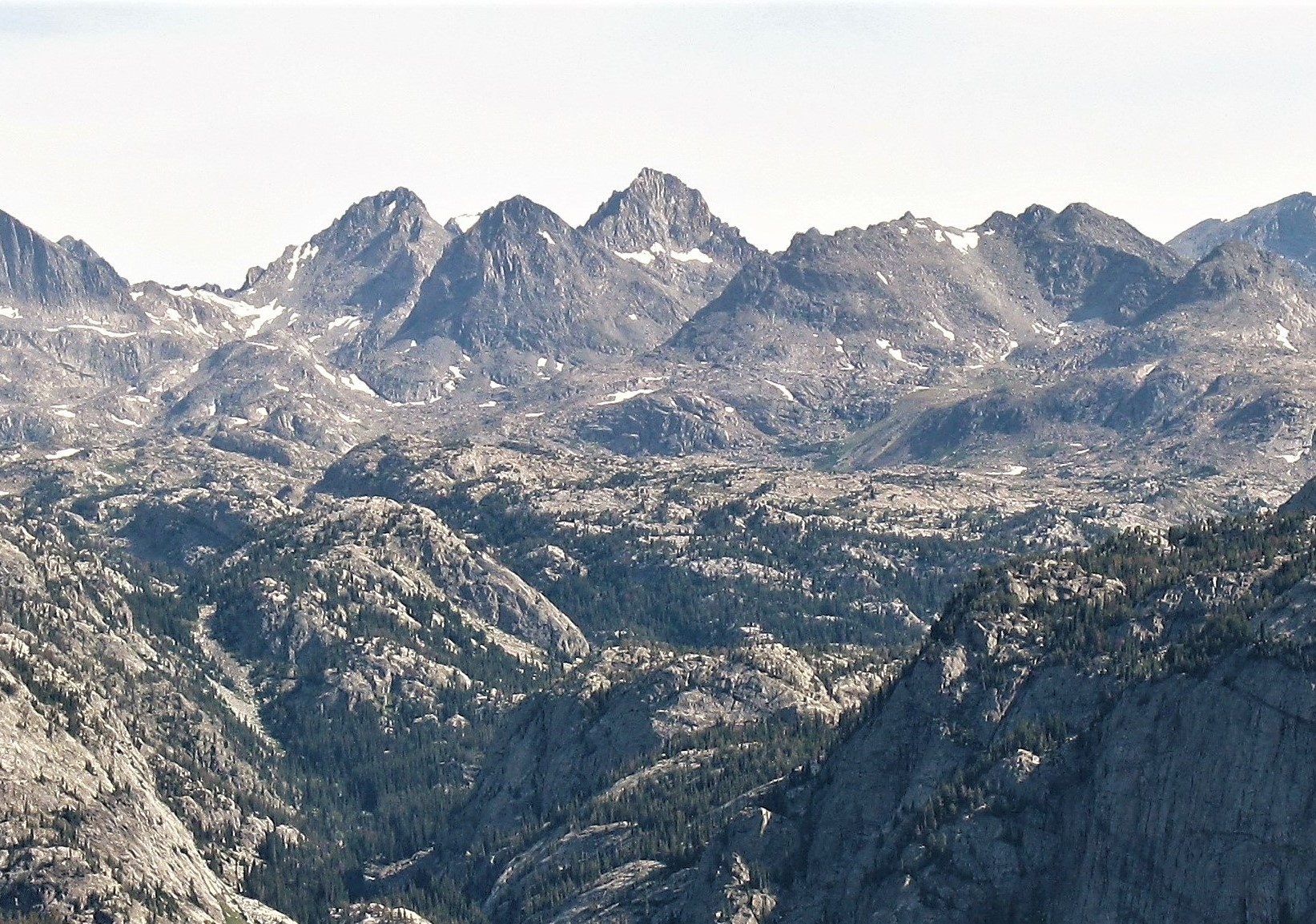
- Henderson Peak centered on skyline with American Legion Peak further to left.

Highest point
- Elevation: 13,211 ft (4,027 m)
- Prominence: 925 ft (282 m)
- Coordinates: 43°08′50″N 109°39′57″W

Geography
- Location within Wyoming Location within the United States
- Location: Sublette County, Wyoming, U.S.
- Parent range: Wind River Range
- Topo map: USGS Gannett Peak

Climbing
- First ascent: 1930 (Henry Buchtel, Jack Seerley and Dudley Smith)
- Easiest route: Scramble

American Legion Peak (13,211 ft (4,027 m)) is located in the northern Wind River Range in the U.S. state of Wyoming. Situated 1 mi (1.6 km) east of Bow Mountain and a couple miles west of Mount Helen, American Legion Peak is the 17th tallest peak in Wyoming. The small American Legion Glacier descends from the east slopes of the mountain and Henderson Peak lies to the south.

== Hazards ==
Encountering bears is a concern in the Wind River Range. There are other concerns as well, including bugs, wildfires, adverse snow conditions and nighttime cold temperatures.

Importantly, there have been notable incidents, including accidental deaths, due to falls from steep cliffs (a misstep could be fatal in this class 4/5 terrain) and due to falling rocks, over the years, including 1993, 2007 (involving an experienced NOLS leader), 2015 and 2018. Other incidents include a seriously injured backpacker being airlifted near SquareTop Mountain in 2005, and a fatal hiker incident (from an apparent accidental fall) in 2006 that involved state search and rescue. The U.S. Forest Service does not offer updated aggregated records on the official number of fatalities in the Wind River Range.
