= Mount Bonneville =

Mountain in Wyoming, United States

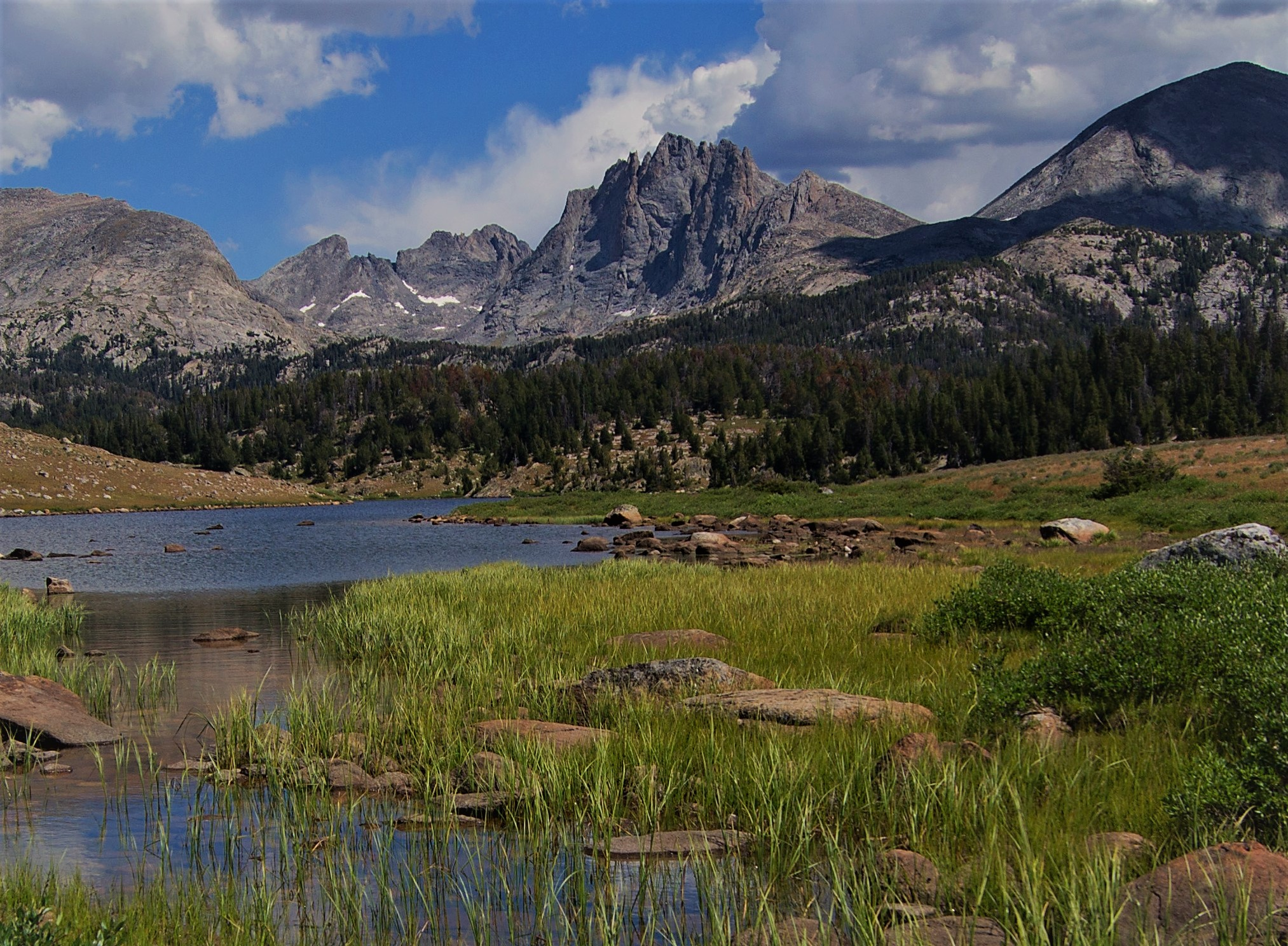
- Mt. Bonneville from Raid Lake

Highest point
- Elevation: 12,590 ft (3,840 m)
- Prominence: 785 ft (239 m)
- Coordinates: 42°52′19″N 109°20′22″W

Geography
- Location within Wyoming Location within the United States
- Location: Sublette County, Wyoming, U.S.
- Parent range: Wind River Range
- Topo map: USGS Mount Bonneville

Climbing
- First ascent: 1946 (Weir Stewart and Harry Willits)

Mount Bonneville (12,590 feet (3,840 m)) is located in the Wind River Range in the U.S. state of Wyoming. The summit is located in the Bridger Wilderness of Bridger-Teton National Forest, immediately west of the Continental Divide. Mount Bonneville is a distinctively iconic peak of the Wind River Range, and was named after explorer Benjamin Bonneville.

== Hazards ==
Encountering bears is a concern in the Wind River Range. There are other concerns as well, including bugs, wildfires, adverse snow conditions and nighttime cold temperatures.

Importantly, there have been notable incidents, including accidental deaths, due to falls from steep cliffs (a misstep could be fatal in this class 4/5 terrain) and due to falling rocks, over the years, including 1993, 2007 (involving an experienced NOLS leader), 2015 and 2018. Other incidents include a seriously injured backpacker being airlifted near SquareTop Mountain in 2005, and a fatal hiker incident (from an apparent accidental fall) in 2006 that involved state search and rescue. The U.S. Forest Service does not offer updated aggregated records on the official number of fatalities in the Wind River Range.
