= American Legion Glacier =

Glacier in the state of Wyoming

- Location within Wyoming
- Type: Mountain glacier
- Location: Sublette County, Wyoming, USA
- Coordinates: 43°08′55″N 109°39′48″W
- Area: 25 acres (10 ha)
- Length: .20 mi (0.32 km)
- Width: .20 mi (0.32 km)
- Terminus: Talus
- Status: Unknown

American Glacier is located in the Bridger Wilderness of Bridger-Teton National Forest, in the U.S. state of Wyoming. Descending from the east slope of American Legion Peak, the glacier elevation ranges from 12,400 to 11,800 ft (3,800 to 3,600 m). American Legion Glacier is just west of Twins Glacier and .50 mi (0.80 km) east of Stroud Glacier and is at the head of the valley known as Titcomb Basin.

== See also ==
- List of glaciers in the United States
