= Fremont Peak (Wyoming) =

Mountain in the state of Wyoming

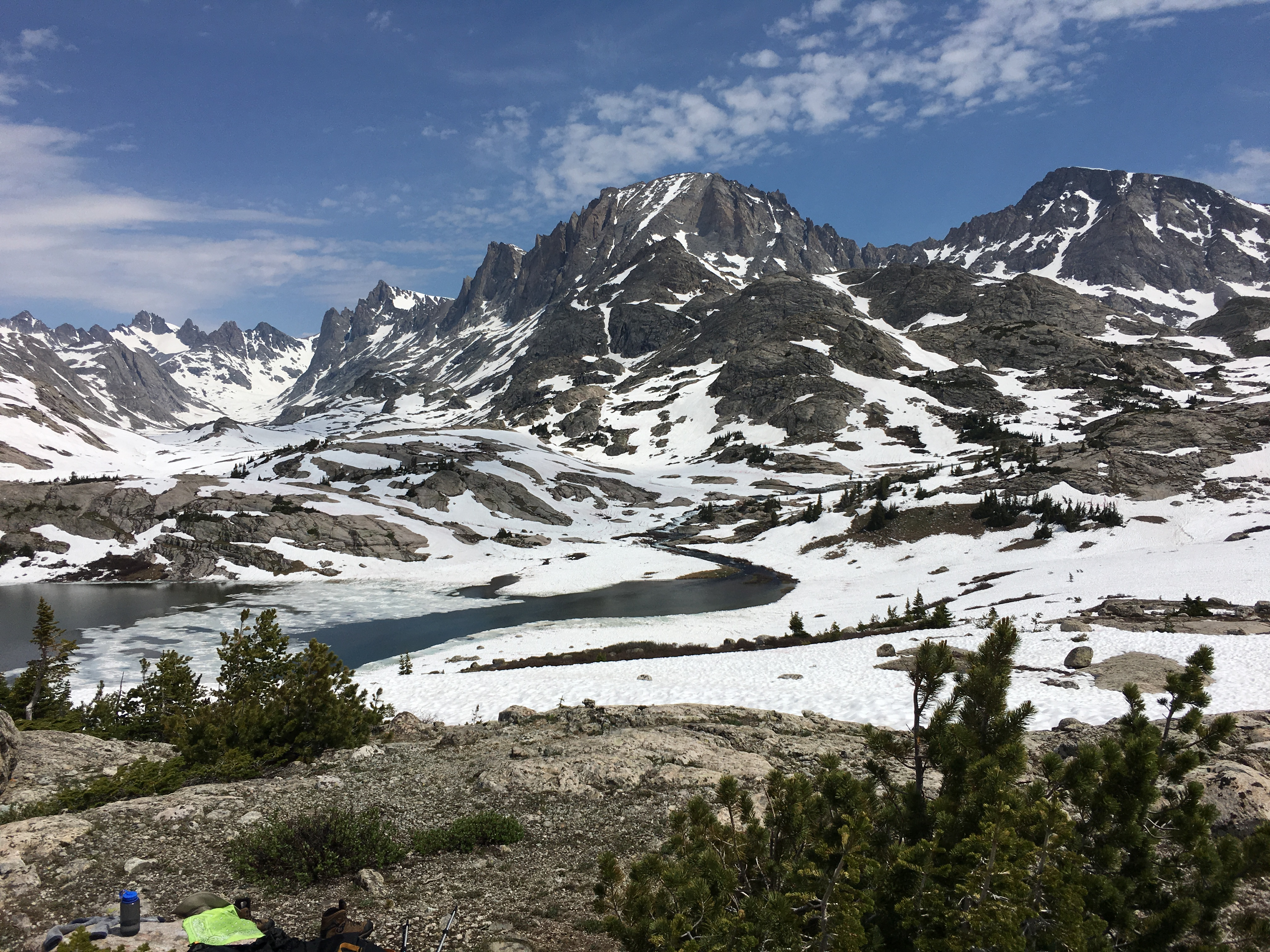
- Fremont Peak at center from near Island Lake

Highest point
- Elevation: 13,751 ft (4,191 m)
- Prominence: 1,184 ft (361 m)
- Coordinates: 43°07′29″N 109°37′05″W

Geography
- Location within Wyoming
- Location: Fremont / Sublette counties, Wyoming, U.S.
- Parent range: Wind River Range
- Topo map: USGS Fremont Peak South

Climbing
- First ascent: 1842 Fremont and others

Fremont Peak is the third highest peak in the state of Wyoming, surpassed only by Gannett Peak and Grand Teton, and straddles the boundary between Fremont and Sublette counties in the Wind River Range. It is named for American explorer John C. Frémont who climbed the peak with Charles Preuss and Johnny Janisse from August 13 to August 15, 1842. Kit Carson had been with the climbing party on its first attempt at the peak, but had gone back for supplies the day Fremont and his men reached the summit. Carson is thought by some to have been the first to climb neighboring Jackson Peak. At that time, Fremont Peak was mistakenly thought to be the highest mountain in the Rocky Mountains, although there are actually over 100 higher peaks in the Rocky Mountain range.

== Geography ==
The peak is located on the Continental Divide and is the second highest peak in the remote Wind River Range after Gannett Peak. The east flank of the peak is in the Fitzpatrick Wilderness of Shoshone National Forest, while the west side is in the Bridger Wilderness of Bridger-Teton National Forest. The Upper Fremont Glacier is located on the north slopes of the mountain.

=== Climate ===
Climate data for Fremont Peak 43.1228 N, 109.6142 W, Elevation: 13,268 ft (4,044 m) (1991–2020 normals)
Month	Jan	Feb	Mar	Apr	May	Jun	Jul	Aug	Sep	Oct	Nov	Dec	Year
Mean daily maximum °F (°C)	17.1 (−8.3)	16.3 (−8.7)	21.9 (−5.6)	27.2 (−2.7)	36.1 (2.3)	46.5 (8.1)	56.0 (13.3)	54.8 (12.7)	46.2 (7.9)	34.0 (1.1)	22.9 (−5.1)	16.7 (−8.5)	33.0 (0.5)
Daily mean °F (°C)	7.8 (−13.4)	6.6 (−14.1)	11.8 (−11.2)	16.6 (−8.6)	25.3 (−3.7)	35.1 (1.7)	43.6 (6.4)	42.4 (5.8)	34.9 (1.6)	23.9 (−4.5)	13.7 (−10.2)	7.6 (−13.6)	22.4 (−5.3)
Mean daily minimum °F (°C)	−1.6 (−18.7)	−3.2 (−19.6)	1.7 (−16.8)	6.0 (−14.4)	14.6 (−9.7)	23.7 (−4.6)	31.1 (−0.5)	30.1 (−1.1)	23.6 (−4.7)	13.8 (−10.1)	4.5 (−15.3)	−1.5 (−18.6)	11.9 (−11.2)
Average precipitation inches (mm)	3.54 (90)	3.62 (92)	3.97 (101)	5.78 (147)	4.48 (114)	2.99 (76)	1.78 (45)	2.01 (51)	3.05 (77)	4.03 (102)	3.25 (83)	3.54 (90)	42.04 (1,068)
Source: PRISM Climate Group

== Climbing ==
The Southwest Buttress route up Fremont Peak is considered Class 3, with minimal exposure. While this isn't beyond the skills of a fit hiker (or dog), the time to ascend nearly 3,000 feet from Indian Basin should not be underestimated. Severe weather (sleet, hail, snow, and ice-covered rock) can occur at any time of the year, and the weather can change quickly. Route-finding is essential and not particularly difficult in good weather, but if clouds come in, or after dark, a climber could easily get off route.

Due to the remote location and changing weather conditions, most mountain climbers spend a total of three to five days hiking up to the mountain, climbing to the summit and then later hiking back to their starting point.

== Hazards ==
Encountering bears is a concern in the Wind River Range. There are other concerns as well, including bugs, wildfires, adverse snow conditions and nighttime cold temperatures.

Importantly, there have been notable incidents, including accidental deaths, due to falls from steep cliffs (a misstep could be fatal in this class 4/5 terrain) and due to falling rocks, over the years, including 1993, 2007 (involving an experienced NOLS leader), 2015 and 2018. Other incidents include a seriously injured backpacker being airlifted near SquareTop Mountain in 2005, and a fatal hiker incident (from an apparent accidental fall) in 2006 that involved state search and rescue. The U.S. Forest Service does not offer updated aggregated records on the official number of fatalities in the Wind River Range.

Fremont Peak (Wind River Range; Rocky Mountains; Wyoming, United States)

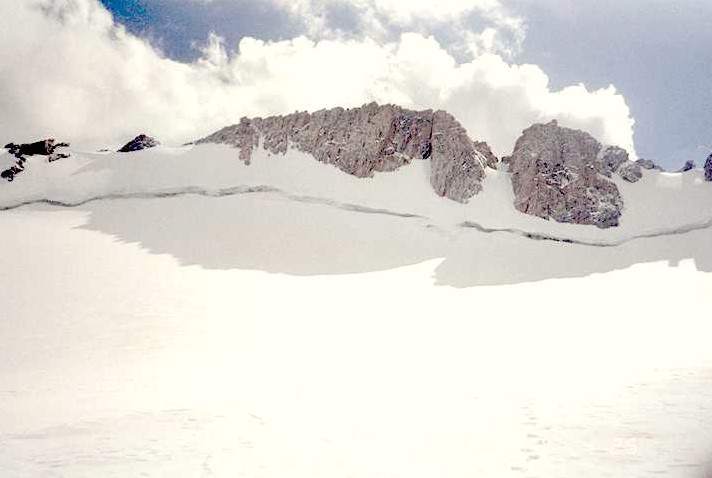
Upper Fremont Glacier on the north slope of Fremont Peak

== Gallery ==
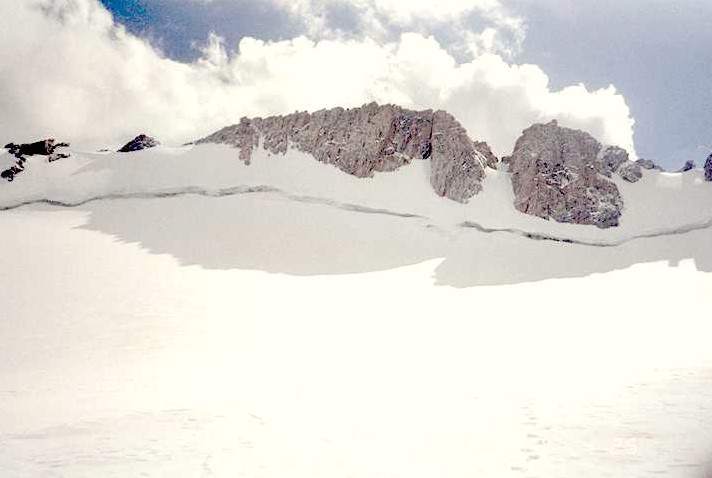
Upper Fremont Glacier on the north slope of Fremont Peak.

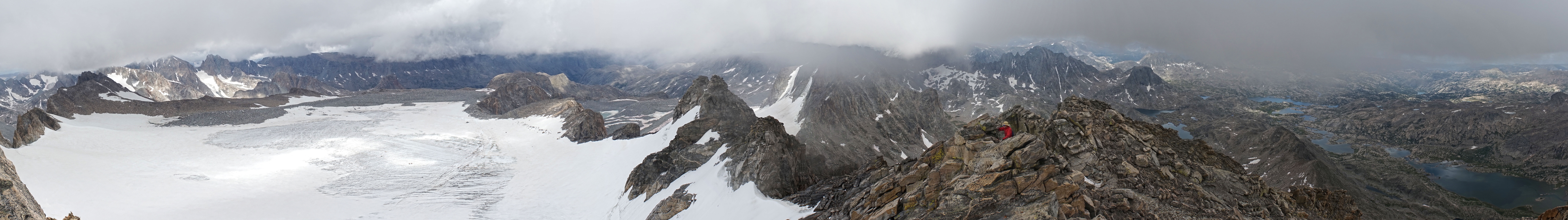
Panorama from the summit of Fremont Peak, Wyoming (13,751'). "I sprang upon the summit, and another step would have precipitated me to an immense snow field five hundred feet below." - from Fremont's report, 1842.

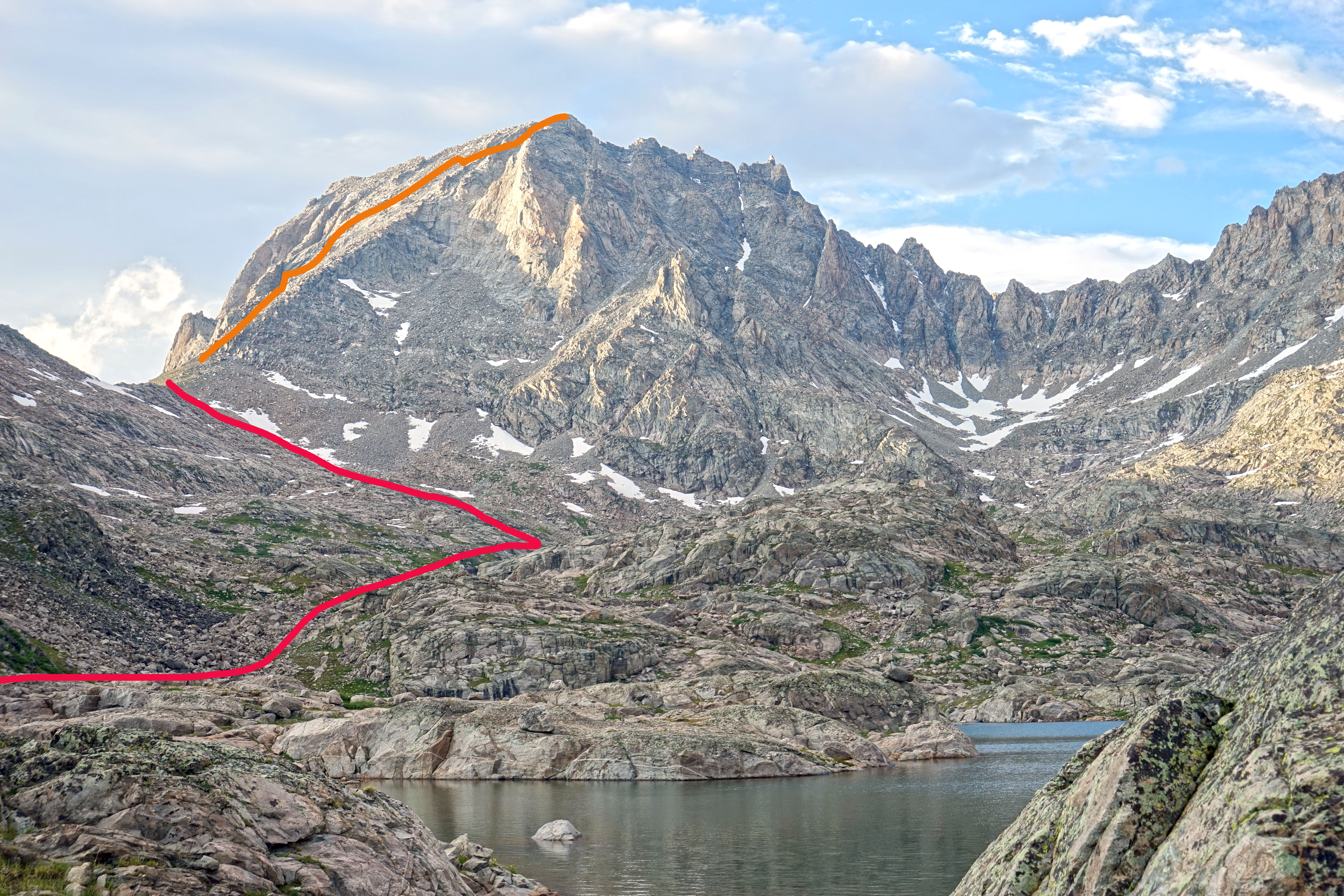
Southwest Buttress route to Fremont Peak (Wyoming) summit.

== See also ==
- List of mountain peaks of the United States
- List of Ultras of the United States
