= Knife Point Glacier =

Glacier in Wyoming, United States

- Location within Wyoming
- Type: Mountain glacier
- Location: Fremont County, Wyoming, USA
- Coordinates: 43°06′41″N 109°34′39″W
- Length: .9 mi (1.4 km)
- Terminus: Talus
- Status: Retreating

Knife Point Glacier is on the east side Continental Divide in the northern Wind River Range in the U.S. state of Wyoming. The glacier is in the Fitzpatrick Wilderness of Shoshone National Forest, and is among the largest grouping of glaciers in the American Rocky Mountains. Knife Point Glacier flows to the north and starts below the summit of Knife Point Mountain (13,001 mi (20,923 km)).

Along with other glaciers in the Wind River Range, Knife Point Glacier's rapid retreat since the end of the Little Ice Age in 1850 has exposed the remains of numerous specimens of the now believed to be extinct Rocky Mountain locust (Melanoplus spretus) and other related species.

== See also ==
- List of glaciers in the United States
