= Mount Geikie =

Mount Geikie, named for Scottish geologist Sir Archibald Geikie, may refer to:

- Mount Geikie (Canada)
- Mount Geikie (Tasmania)
- Mount Geikie (Wyoming)

== See also ==
- Geikie Peak, Arizona
