= Stroud Glacier =

Glacier in the state of Wyoming

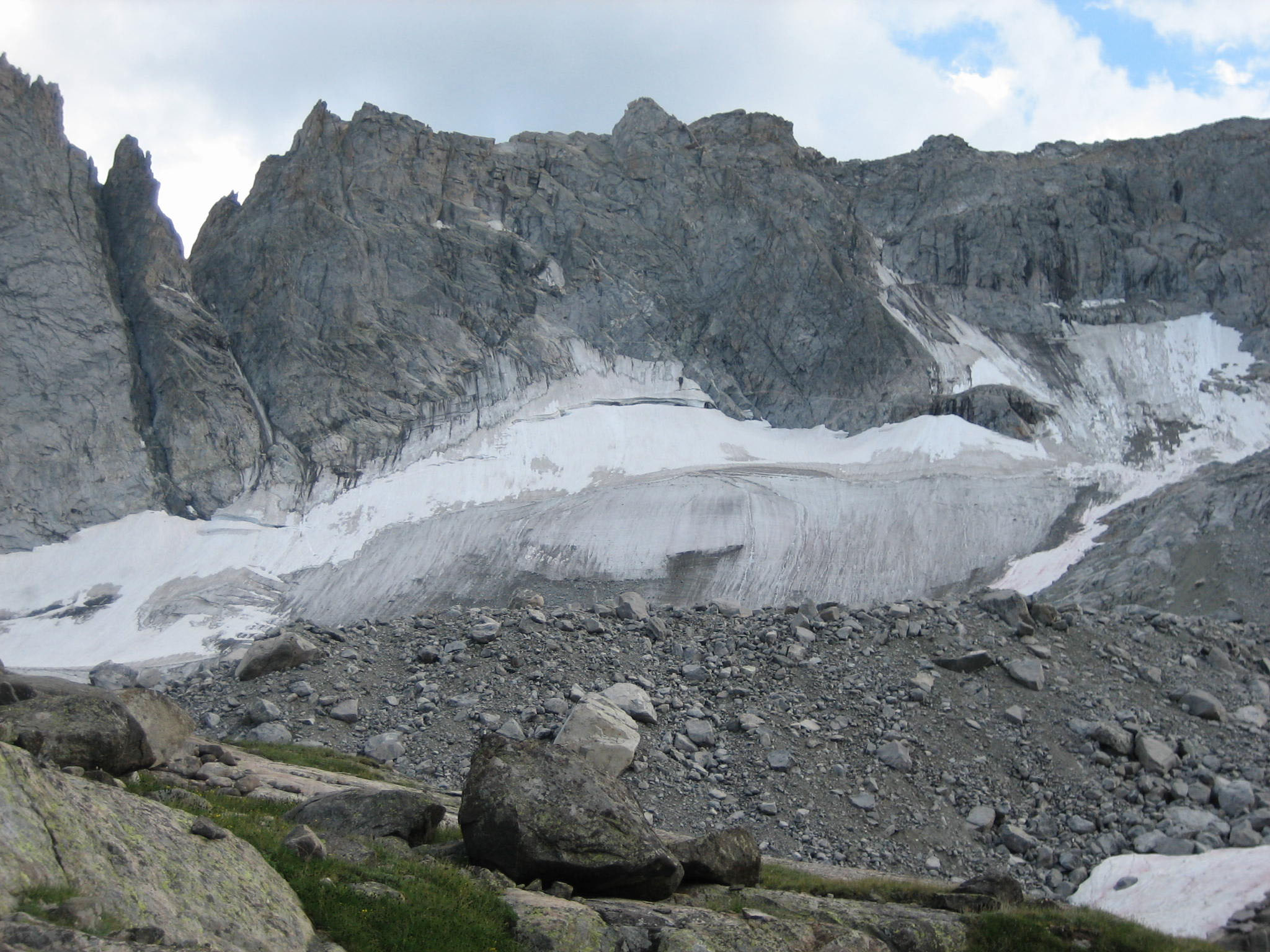
- Stroud Glacier in 2009

- Location within Wyoming
- Type: Mountain glacier
- Location: Sublette County, Wyoming, USA
- Coordinates: 43°08′50″N 109°40′46″W
- Length: .30 mi (0.48 km)
- Terminus: Talus/proglacial lake
- Status: Retreating

Stroud Glacier is west of the Continental Divide in the northern Wind River Range in the U.S. state of Wyoming. The glacier is located in the Bridger Wilderness of Bridger-Teton National Forest, and is among the largest grouping of glaciers in the American Rocky Mountains. The glacier is situated in a north facing cirque, below the summit of Bow Mountain.

== See also ==
- List of glaciers in the United States
