= Accidental killing =

Types of accidental killing include:

- Involuntary manslaughter if unlawful
- Accidental death if not due to unreasonable behavior
- Collateral damage (a euphemism) if due to imprecise or incorrect targeting during wartime
