= Harrower Glacier =

Glacier in the state of Wyoming

- Location within Wyoming
- Type: Mountain glacier
- Location: Sublette County, Wyoming, USA
- Coordinates: 43°06′02″N 109°35′18″W
- Length: .2 mi (0.32 km)
- Terminus: Talus
- Status: Retreating

Harrower Glacier is located on the west side of the Continental Divide in the northern Wind River Range in the US state of Wyoming. The glacier is in the Bridger Wilderness of Bridger-Teton National Forest, and is among the largest grouping of glaciers in the American Rocky Mountains. Harrower Glacier flows to the north and is situated in a cirque, below the summit of Knife Point Mountain (13,001 ft (3,963 m)).

== See also ==
- List of glaciers in the United States
