= Silas Canyon =

Canyon near Lander, Wyoming, U.S.

- IUCN category III (natural monument or feature)
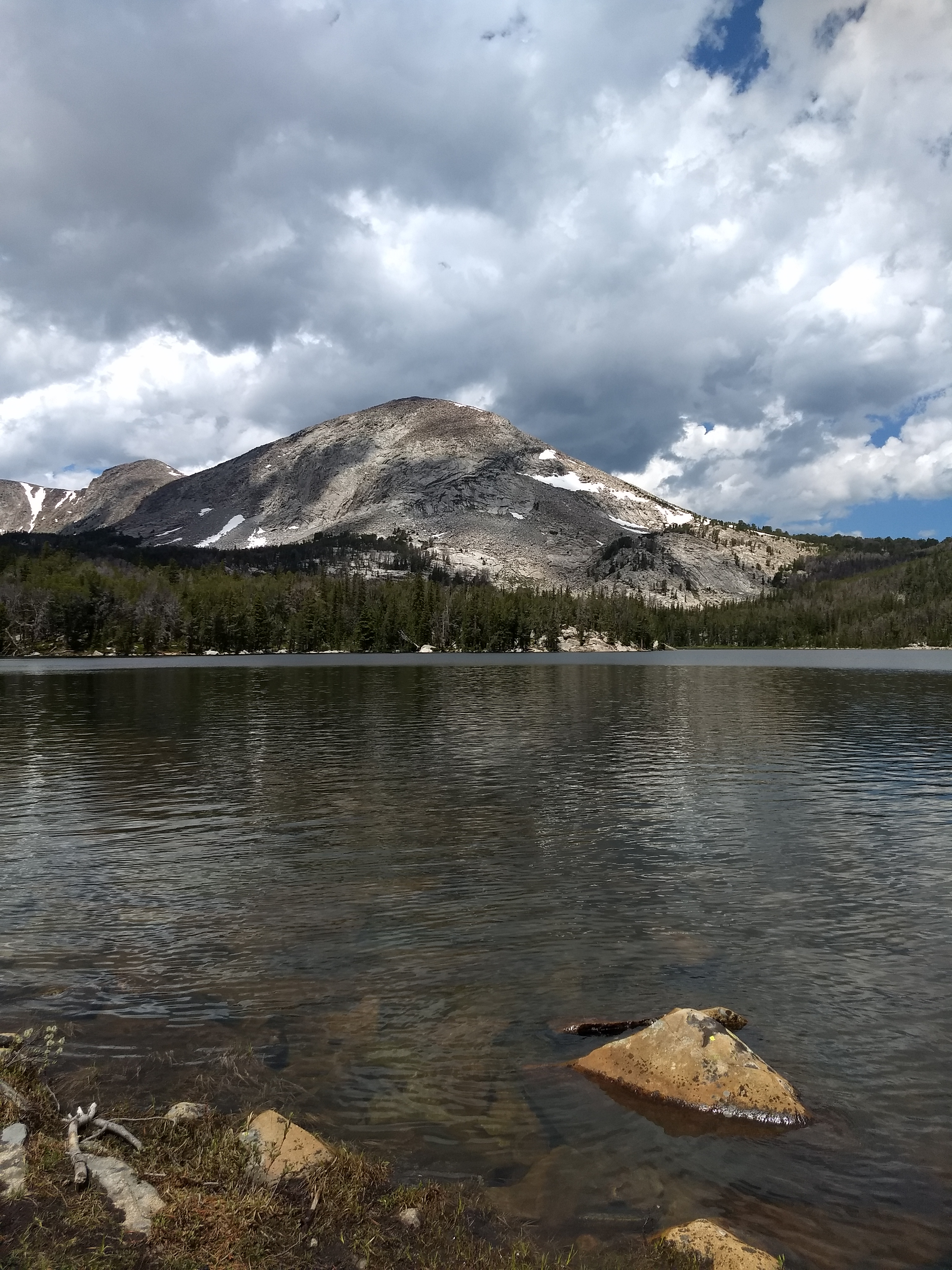
- Upper Silas Lake near the mouth of Silas Canyon.

- Location within Wyoming
- Location: Lander, Fremont County, Wyoming, United States
- Coordinates: 42°47′59.5″N 108°57′13.1″W
- Elevation: 10,102 ft (3,079 m)

Silas Canyon is a canyon in the Wind River mountain range near Lander, Wyoming in the United States.

The canyon is a long glacial-carved trough with numerous lakes, which makes it a popular destination for backpackers and fishermen. The 33-acre (13 ha) Thumb Lake sits at its head.

Plant life

Silas Canyon and the surrounding area is home the various plant species common in the Southern Wind River Mountains. Whitebark pine and Lodgepole pine are the predominant tree species.
