= Museum of the Mountain Man =

Coordinates: 42°52′08″N 109°51′09″W

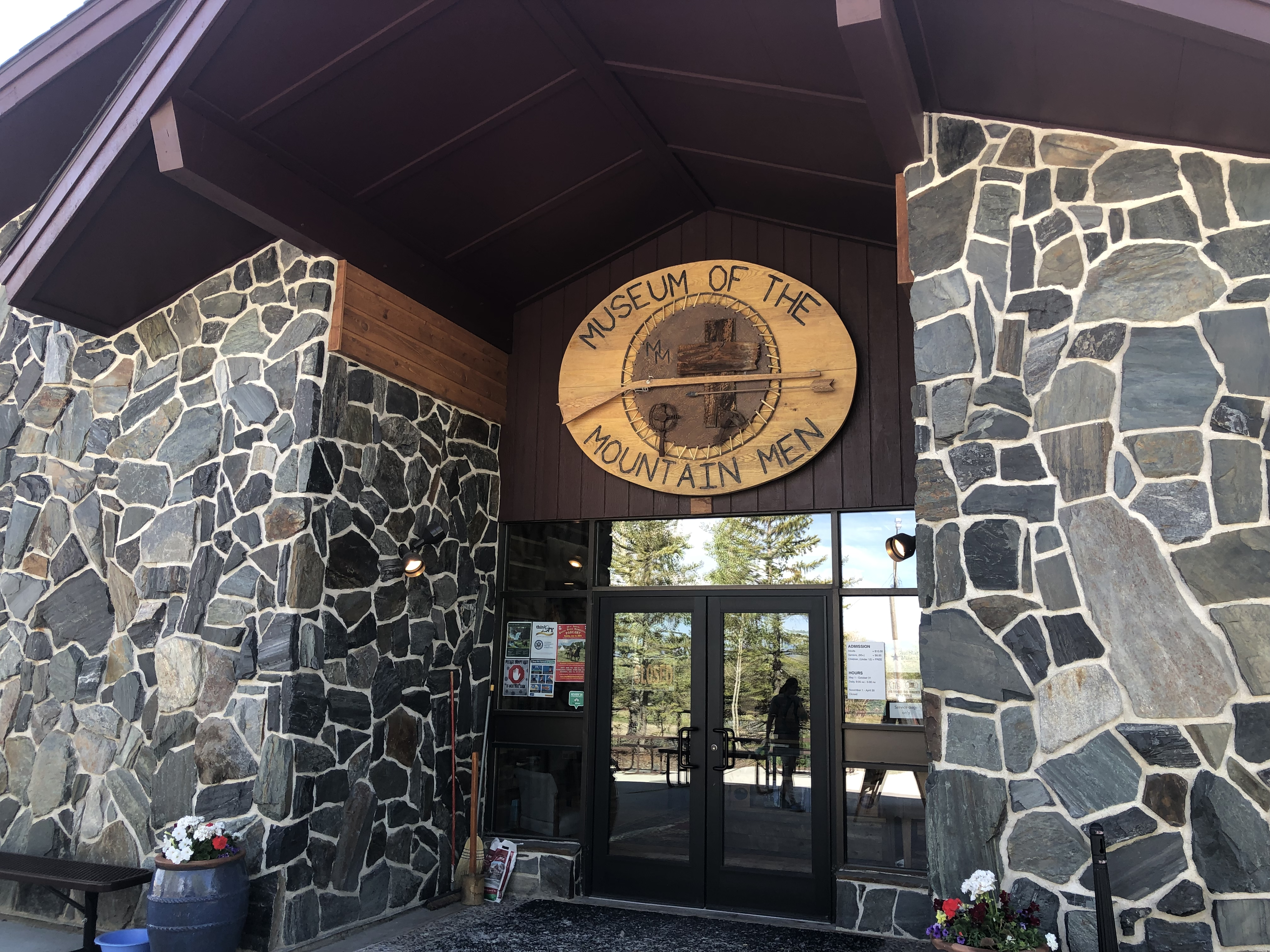
Entrance to Museum of the Mountain Man

Museum of the Mountain Man is a museum located in Pinedale, Wyoming, US that exhibits western historical pieces relating to the mountain men who explored the region in the early to middle part of the 19th century. The museum is typically open during the summer months.
