= White Pine Ski Resort =

Ski area in Wyoming, United States

- Location in Wyoming White Pine Ski Resort (the United States)
- Location: Wind River Range, Sublette County, Wyoming
- Nearest city: Pinedale, Wyoming
- Coordinates: 42°58′40.22″N 109°45′29.42″W
- Top elevation: 9,500 feet (2,896 m)
- Base elevation: 8,450 feet (2,576 m)
- Trails: 25+
- Night skiing: No
- Website: Official website

White Pine Ski Area and Resort is a ski resort located 10 miles (16 km) from Pinedale, Wyoming in northern Sublette County. The mountain holds about 25 trails of differing challenge. Of the trails, 25% are beginner, 45% are intermediate and 30% of the trails are advanced. Along with downhill skiing, the resort also offers several groomed trails for cross country skiing. The resort features cabins available to rent as well as daily food service and ski school. The previous lodge was constructed in 1999. However the lodge burned to the ground on the night of July 11, 2019. White Pine Ski Resort's regular season usually runs annually between Thanksgiving and Easter. The resort has a ski shop located in Pinedale, which both rents and sells ski and snowboarding equipment. The resort houses three quad lifts, two of which are in current operation, the other being a tow rope.

== Off season ==
During the summer, White Pine Ski Resort offered downhill mountain biking, with fourteen trails to choose from, some with wood planks to ride on. The resort houses a day camp during the month of June, as well as horseback riding and overnight camping, in the nearby Wind River Range.
