= Fitzpatrick Wilderness =

Wilderness area in Wyoming, United States

- IUCN category Ib (wilderness area)
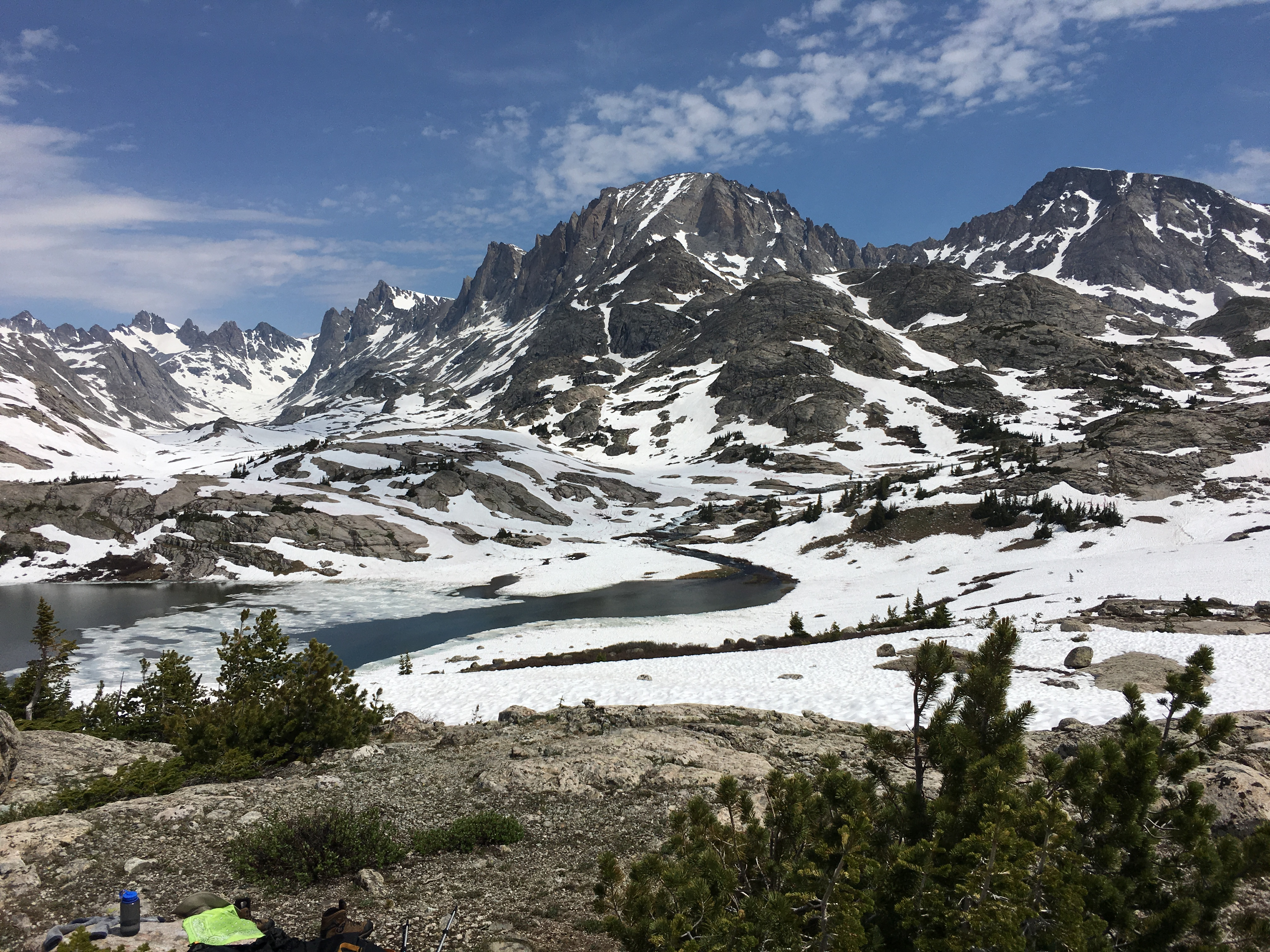
- Fremont Peak (Wyoming) in the Wind River Range near the Fitzpatrick Wilderness

- Location within the United States
- Location: Fremont / Sublette counties, Wyoming, United States
- Nearest city: Lander, WY
- Coordinates: 43°12′N 109°38′W
- Area: 198,525 acres (803.40 km^{2})
- Established: 1976
- Governing body: U.S. Forest Service

The Fitzpatrick Wilderness is located in Shoshone National Forest in the U.S. state of Wyoming. The wilderness was originally known as the Glacier Primitive Area, but was redesignated a wilderness in 1976.

== Overview ==
U.S. Wilderness Areas do not allow motorized or mechanized vehicles, including bicycles. Although camping and fishing are allowed with proper permit, no roads or buildings are constructed and there is also no logging or mining, in compliance with the 1964 Wilderness Act. Wilderness areas within National Forests and Bureau of Land Management areas also allow hunting in season.

Fremont Peak (Wind River Range; Rocky Mountains; Wyoming, United States)

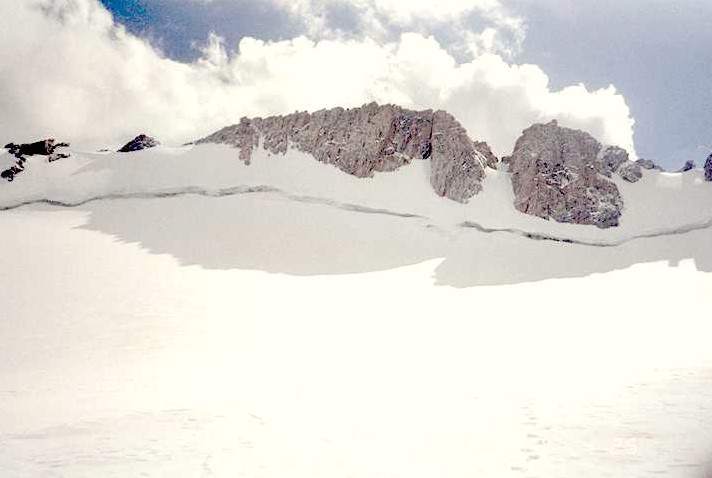
Upper Fremont Glacier on the north slope of Fremont Peak

== Hazards ==
Encountering bears is a concern in the Wind River Range. There are other concerns as well, including bugs, wildfires, adverse snow conditions and nighttime cold temperatures.

Importantly, there have been notable incidents, including accidental deaths, due to falls from steep cliffs (a misstep could be fatal in this class 4/5 terrain) and due to falling rocks, over the years, including 1993,, 1998, 2007 (involving an experienced NOLS leader),, 2015 and 2018. Other incidents include a seriously injured backpacker being airlifted near SquareTop Mountain in 2005, and a fatal hiker incident (from an apparent accidental fall) in 2006 that involved state search and rescue. The U.S. Forest Service does not offer updated aggregated records on the official number of fatalities in the Wind River Range.

== See also ==
- List of U.S. Wilderness Areas
