= Bridger Wilderness =

Wilderness area in Wyoming, United States

- IUCN category Ib (wilderness area)
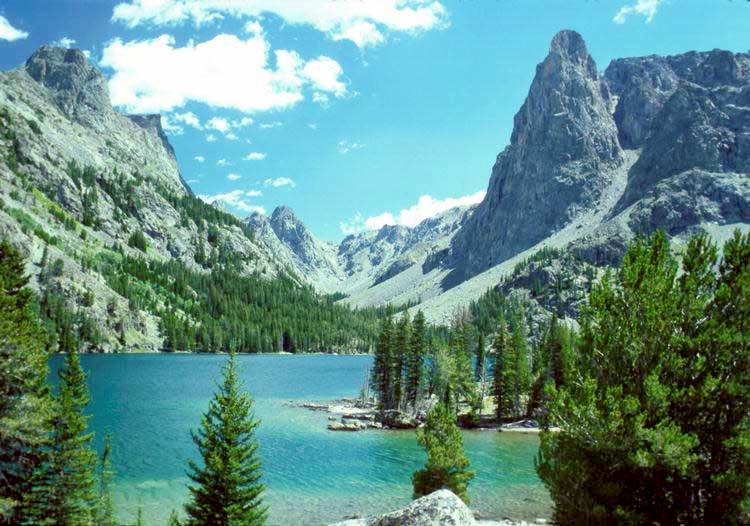
- Slide Lake

- Location within the United States
- Location: Sublette / Fremont counties, Wyoming, United States
- Nearest city: Pinedale, Wyoming
- Coordinates: 43°10′19″N 109°40′27″W
- Area: 428,169 acres (1,732.74 km^{2})
- Established: 1964
- Governing body: U.S. Forest Service

The Bridger Wilderness is located in Bridger-Teton National Forest in Wyoming, United States. Originally established in 1931 as a primitive area, 428,169-acre (1,732.74 km^{2}) region was redesignated as a wilderness in 1964 and expanded to the current size in 1984. It is named after the explorer Jim Bridger who was one of the first non-indigenous people to describe the area. The wilderness lies on the west side of the Continental Divide in the Wind River Range and contains Gannett Peak; at 13,809 feet (4,209 m) it is the tallest mountain in Wyoming. The wilderness is a part of the Greater Yellowstone Ecosystem.

U.S. Wilderness Areas do not allow motorized or mechanized vehicles, including bicycles. Although camping and fishing are allowed with proper permit, no roads or buildings are constructed and there is also no logging or mining, in compliance with the 1964 Wilderness Act. Wilderness areas within National Forests and Bureau of Land Management areas also allow hunting in season.

There are 600 miles (970 km) of hiking trails maintained in the wilderness, but with much of the terrain being steep and with many large mountain peaks to climb, many trails exist only to provide access to climbing routes. Camping is permitted as long as a distance of at least 200 feet (61 m) minimum is maintained away from lakes and streams. Due to the high altitude associated with this wilderness, it is not uncommon to have freezing weather, especially at night, any time of the year. In the summer months mosquitos can also be a problem.

The largest glaciers in Bridger-Teton National Forest are found in the wilderness. While lower slopes of the mountainsides are dominated by aspen and lodgepole pine, the upper altitudes include lodgepole pine, and numerous species of spruce and fir. Above the timberline at 10,300 feet (3,100 m), the plants are delicate and subject to high human impact and care must be used to stay on trails to minimize natural resource impact which can take decades or more for recovery. Infrequent and rare sightings of grizzly bears have been recorded but black bears are much more common. In addition, most of the megafauna originally indigenous to the region still exist in the wilderness including moose, elk, mule deer, wolverine, bighorn sheep and mountain lion. There have been unconfirmed reports of wolf sightings which may be true due to wolf reintroduction commenced in the late 20th century in Yellowstone National Park to the north. Numerous bird species are found including bald eagle, osprey, peregrine falcon and Clark's nutcracker. The streams have long been home to several species of trout, but stocking of the lakes has increased their numbers there along with mountain whitefish and grayling.

== Hazards ==
Encountering bears is a concern in the Wind River Range. There are other concerns as well, including bugs, wildfires, adverse snow conditions and nighttime cold temperatures.

Importantly, there have been notable incidents, including accidental deaths, due to falls from steep cliffs (a misstep could be fatal in this class 4/5 terrain) and due to falling rocks, over the years, including 1993, 2007 (involving an experienced NOLS leader), 2015 and 2018. Other incidents include a seriously injured backpacker being airlifted near SquareTop Mountain in 2005, and a fatal hiker incident (from an apparent accidental fall) in 2006 that involved state search and rescue. The U.S. Forest Service does not offer updated aggregated records on the official number of fatalities in the Wind River Range.

== See also ==
- List of U.S. Wilderness Areas
