= Pinedale, Wyoming =

- Town
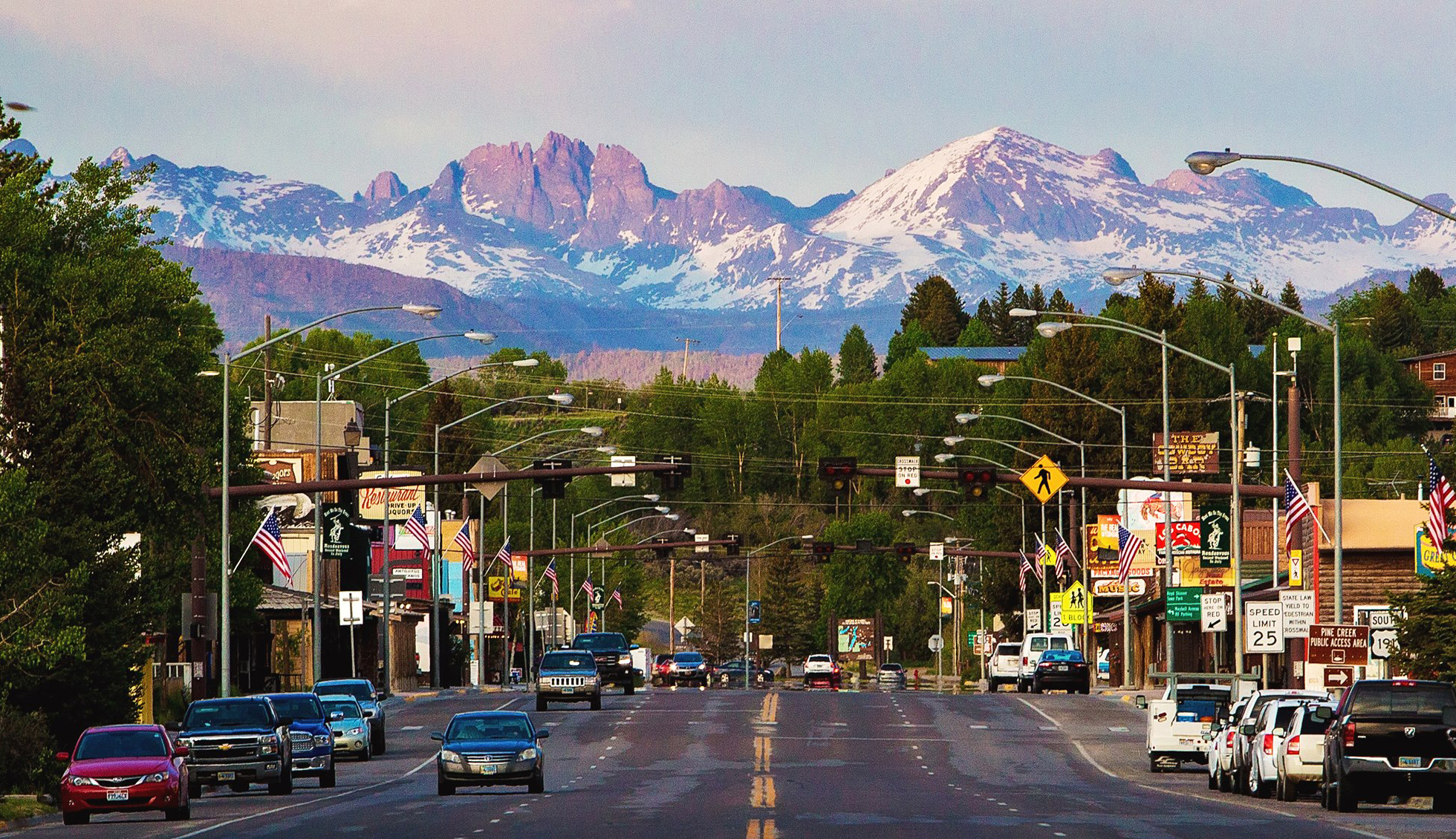
- Pine Street, Pinedale, Wyoming - Looking East
- Motto: All the Civilization You Need
- Location of Pinedale in Sublette County, Wyoming
- Coordinates: 42°52′21″N 109°52′33″W
- Country: United States
- State: Wyoming
- County: Sublette

Area
  - Total: 2.17 sq mi (5.61 km^{2})
  - Land: 2.17 sq mi (5.61 km^{2})
  - Water: 0 sq mi (0.00 km^{2})
- Elevation: 7,182 ft (2,189 m)

Population (2020)
  - Total: 2,005
  - Density: 864.4/sq mi (333.76/km^{2})
- Time zone: UTC−7 (Mountain (MST))
  - Summer (DST): UTC−6 (MDT)
- ZIP code: 82941
- Area code: 307
- FIPS code: 56-61580
- GNIS feature ID: 2413134
- Website: www.townofpinedale.us

Pinedale is a town in and the county seat of Sublette County, Wyoming, United States. The population was 2,005 at the 2020 census. Pinedale is an important hunting outfitting town and a gateway to the Wind River Range. Additionally, Pinedale is near several large natural gas fields, including the Pinedale Anticline and Jonah Field. Attractions include the Museum of the Mountain Man, Green River Rendezvous Days, White Pine Ski Area, the Pinedale Aquatic Center and the Town Park System along the Pine Creek Corridor in the middle of town.

== Geography ==
According to the United States Census Bureau, the town has a total area of 2.15 square miles (5.57 km^{2}), all land.

There are 1,300 lakes around the Pinedale area. Fremont Lake, four miles from Pinedale, is the most commonly used lake, and Wyoming's second largest natural lake.

Pine Creek flows from nearby Fremont Lake through the town on its way to the Green River.

=== Climate ===
Pinedale has a humid continental climate (Köppen Dfb) with summers featuring warm afternoons and cold mornings, plus very cold, dry winters. The average January low is 1.9 °F (−16.7 °C), on average 46.3 mornings fall to or below 0 °F or −17.8 °C and between 1991 and 2020, the temperature dropped to −26 °F or −32.2 °C in an average year. The coldest temperature on record since records started in 1948 is −49 °F (−45 °C) during the bitter cold wave of December 1990.

Although the winters are dry, there is enough moisture in the cold air for 76.1 inches or 1.93 metres of snow during a typical winter, with the range being from 166.5 inches (4.23 m) between July 2016 and June 2017 to 28.4 inches (0.72 m) between July 1962 and June 1963.

Climate data for Pinedale, Wyoming, 1991–2020 normals, extremes 1948–present
Month	Jan	Feb	Mar	Apr	May	Jun	Jul	Aug	Sep	Oct	Nov	Dec	Year
Record high °F (°C)	55 (13)	51 (11)	67 (19)	77 (25)	85 (29)	91 (33)	94 (34)	91 (33)	90 (32)	81 (27)	70 (21)	56 (13)	94 (34)
Mean maximum °F (°C)	39.5 (4.2)	41.5 (5.3)	54.1 (12.3)	67.1 (19.5)	76.3 (24.6)	82.3 (27.9)	87.3 (30.7)	85.6 (29.8)	81.5 (27.5)	71.1 (21.7)	55.6 (13.1)	42.1 (5.6)	87.3 (30.7)
Mean daily maximum °F (°C)	28.0 (−2.2)	30.7 (−0.7)	40.5 (4.7)	50.9 (10.5)	61.4 (16.3)	71.3 (21.8)	79.9 (26.6)	78.3 (25.7)	69.2 (20.7)	55.2 (12.9)	39.7 (4.3)	28.6 (−1.9)	52.8 (11.6)
Daily mean °F (°C)	15.0 (−9.4)	17.3 (−8.2)	27.2 (−2.7)	37.0 (2.8)	45.8 (7.7)	54.5 (12.5)	61.3 (16.3)	59.1 (15.1)	50.8 (10.4)	39.5 (4.2)	26.2 (−3.2)	16.0 (−8.9)	37.5 (3.1)
Mean daily minimum °F (°C)	1.9 (−16.7)	3.9 (−15.6)	14.0 (−10.0)	23.1 (−4.9)	30.2 (−1.0)	37.7 (3.2)	42.8 (6.0)	40.0 (4.4)	32.5 (0.3)	23.8 (−4.6)	12.8 (−10.7)	3.4 (−15.9)	22.2 (−5.5)
Mean minimum °F (°C)	−19.9 (−28.8)	−18.3 (−27.9)	−7.1 (−21.7)	8.9 (−12.8)	17.0 (−8.3)	27.0 (−2.8)	33.5 (0.8)	28.7 (−1.8)	20.5 (−6.4)	7.1 (−13.8)	−5.4 (−20.8)	−18.0 (−27.8)	−25.6 (−32.0)
Record low °F (°C)	−44 (−42)	−42 (−41)	−32 (−36)	−13 (−25)	−2 (−19)	18 (−8)	23 (−5)	18 (−8)	8 (−13)	−17 (−27)	−28 (−33)	−49 (−45)	−49 (−45)
Average precipitation inches (mm)	0.70 (18)	0.76 (19)	0.73 (19)	1.07 (27)	1.89 (48)	1.36 (35)	0.88 (22)	0.96 (24)	1.21 (31)	0.93 (24)	0.64 (16)	0.74 (19)	11.87 (302)
Average snowfall inches (cm)	13.2 (34)	12.5 (32)	9.4 (24)	8.2 (21)	2.8 (7.1)	0.6 (1.5)	0.0 (0.0)	0.0 (0.0)	0.6 (1.5)	5.2 (13)	10.1 (26)	13.5 (34)	76.1 (194.1)
Average extreme snow depth inches (cm)	13 (33)	15 (38)	13 (33)	4 (10)	0 (0)	0 (0)	0 (0)	0 (0)	0 (0)	2 (5.1)	5 (13)	9 (23)	15 (38)
Average precipitation days (≥ 0.01 inch)	7.2	7.9	7.2	8.2	10.7	7.9	7.1	7.3	6.8	6.4	6.7	7.1	90.5
Average snowy days (≥ 0.1 inch)	7.2	7.4	5.4	4.5	1.1	0.3	0.0	0.0	0.3	2.1	5.9	7.6	41.8
Source: NOAA

=== Wildlife ===
Pinedale and the surrounding area are home to a large population of wildlife including both grizzly and black bear, moose, elk, pronghorn, mule deer, whitetail deer, bighorn sheep, and mountain lions. Over seven species of trout, including rainbow and brown can be found in the area lakes.

== Demographics ==
Historical population
Census	Pop.	Note	%±
1920	94		—
1930	219		133.0%
1940	647		195.4%
1950	770		19.0%
1960	965		25.3%
1970	948		−1.8%
1980	1,066		12.4%
1990	1,181		10.8%
2000	1,412		19.6%
2010	2,030		43.8%
2020	2,005		−1.2%
2023 (est.)	2,034	▲	1.4%
U.S. Decennial Census

=== 2020 census ===
As of the 2020 census, Pinedale had a population of 2,005. The median age was 35.6 years. 29.0% of residents were under the age of 18 and 15.5% of residents were 65 years of age or older. For every 100 females there were 101.1 males, and for every 100 females age 18 and over there were 99.0 males age 18 and over.

0.0% of residents lived in urban areas, while 100.0% lived in rural areas.

There were 824 households in Pinedale, of which 34.1% had children under the age of 18 living in them. Of all households, 44.5% were married-couple households, 23.8% were households with a male householder and no spouse or partner present, and 23.4% were households with a female householder and no spouse or partner present. About 31.7% of all households were made up of individuals and 11.1% had someone living alone who was 65 years of age or older.

There were 979 housing units, of which 15.8% were vacant. The homeowner vacancy rate was 2.1% and the rental vacancy rate was 9.6%.

Racial composition as of the 2020 census
Race	Number	Percent
White	1,665	83.0%
Black or African American	7	0.3%
American Indian and Alaska Native	16	0.8%
Asian	17	0.8%
Native Hawaiian and Other Pacific Islander	1	0.0%
Some other race	132	6.6%
Two or more races	167	8.3%
Hispanic or Latino (of any race)	269	13.4%

=== 2010 census ===
As of the census of 2010, there were 2,030 people, 847 households, and 484 families residing in the town. The population density was 944.2 inhabitants per square mile (364.6/km^{2}). There were 1,080 housing units at an average density of 502.3 units per square mile (193.9 units/km^{2}). The racial makeup of the town was 90.5% White, 0.7% African American, 0.6% Native American, 1.3% Asian, 4.8% from other races, and 2.0% from two or more races. Hispanic or Latino people of any race were 9.9% of the population.

There were 847 households, of which 30.1% had children under the age of 18 living with them, 44.9% were married couples living together, 8.4% had a female householder with no husband present, 3.9% had a male householder with no wife present, and 42.9% were non-families. 31.4% of all households were made up of individuals, and 8.2% had someone living alone who was 65 years of age or older. The average household size was 2.37 and the average family size was 2.96.

The median age in the town was 33.5 years. 23.1% of residents were under the age of 18; 9.6% were between the ages of 18 and 24; 33.2% were from 25 to 44; 24.9% were from 45 to 64; and 9.1% were 65 years of age or older. The gender makeup of the town was 54.8% male and 45.2% female.

=== 2000 census ===
As of the census of 2000, there were 1,412 people, 582 households, and 368 families residing in the town. The population density was 996.5 people per square mile (384.8 people/km^{2}). There were 718 housing units at an average density of 506.7 units per square mile (195.6 units/km^{2}). The racial makeup of the town was 96.95% White, 0.35% African American, 0.71% Native American, 0.14% Asian, 0.14% Pacific Islander, 0.42% from other races, and 1.27% from two or more races. Hispanic or Latino people of any race were 1.49% of the population.

There were 582 households, out of which 32.0% had children under the age of 18 living with them, 52.4% were married couples living together, 7.4% had a female householder with no husband present, and 36.6% were non-families. 30.1% of all households were made up of individuals, and 8.9% had someone living alone who was 65 years of age or older. The average household size was 2.30 and the average family size was 2.89.

In the town, the population was spread out, with 24.6% under the age of 18, 6.3% from 18 to 24, 26.6% from 25 to 44, 26.3% from 45 to 64, and 16.1% who were 65 years of age or older. The median age was 39 years. For every 100 females, there were 100.0 males. For every 100 females age 18 and over, there were 97.8 males.

The median income for a household in the town was $35,188, and the median income for a family was $40,880. Males had a median income of $31,976 versus $22,143 for females. The per capita income for the town was $20,441. About 7.8% of families and 8.9% of the population were below the poverty line, including 5.5% of those under age 18 and 10.4% of those age 65 or over.

== Education ==
Public education in the town of Pinedale is provided by Sublette County School District #1. Schools serving the town include Pinedale Elementary School (grades K–5), Pinedale Middle School (grades 6–8), and Pinedale High School (grades 9–12) (Pinedale Skyline Academy) grades (9–12)

== Tourism ==
The region offers many outdoor activities with its close proximity to the Wind River Range. These activities include fishing, hiking, camping, boating, four-wheeling, hunting, skiing/snowboarding, snowmobiling, ice fishing, and ice skating. The town hosts the Green River Rendezvous, a reenactment of historic fur trader gatherings at the Upper Green River Rendezvous Site in nearby Daniel. During Rendezvous, rodeos take place at the rodeo grounds and many businesses and vendors set up booths around town.

== Hazards ==
Encountering bears is a concern in the Wind River Range. There are other concerns as well, including bugs, wildfires, adverse snow conditions and nighttime cold temperatures.

There have been accidental deaths due to falls from steep cliffs (a misstep could be fatal in this class 4/5 terrain) and due to falling rocks, over the years, including 1993, 2007 (involving an experienced NOLS leader), 2015 and 2018. Other incidents included a seriously injured backpacker being airlifted near SquareTop Mountain in 2005, and a hiker fatality from an apparent accidental fall in 2006 that involved state search and rescue.
