= Accidental death =

Unnatural death caused by accident

Accidental deaths in the United States

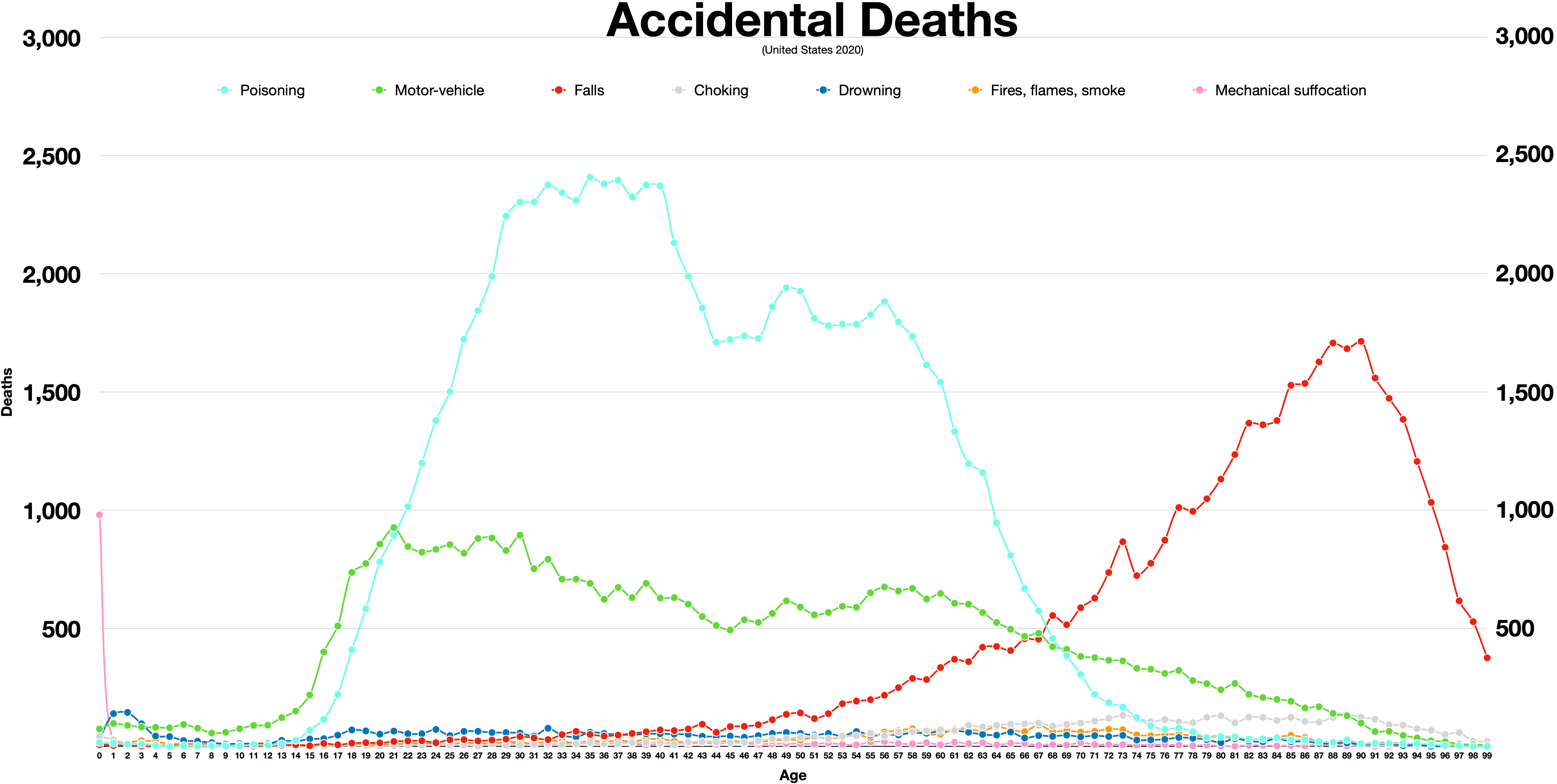
2020

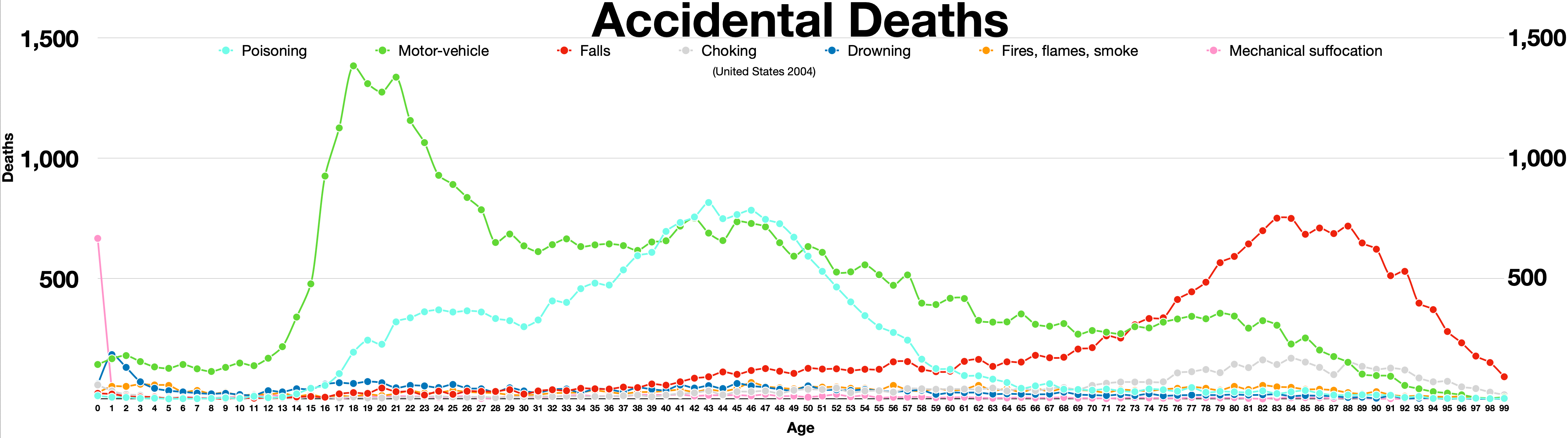
2004

Poisoning
Motor-vehicle
Falls
Choking
Drowning
Fires, flames, smoke
Suffocation

An accidental death is an unnatural death that is caused by an accident, such as a slip and fall, traffic collision, or accidental poisoning. Accidental deaths are distinguished from death by natural causes, disease, and from intentional homicides and suicide. An accidental death can still be considered a homicide or suicide if a person was the unintentional cause.

For criminal purposes, intentional homicides are usually classified as murder. Exceptions such as self-defense vary by jurisdiction, and in some cases, persons accused of murder have asserted as a defense that the deceased was actually the victim of an accidental death, rather than an intentional act. However, a person who is responsible for the accidental death of another through negligence may still be criminally liable for manslaughter, and civilly liable for wrongful death. Accidental death and dismemberment insurance and similar insurance policies pay a benefit in the event of accidental death, With these policies it must be demonstrated that a given death is in fact an accident, rather than an intentional suicide or homicide (which might involve insurance fraud).

The "vast majority of accidents are not really accidents of chance, but rather accidents of folly, negligence, and blatant human misjudgment". The Centers for Disease Control and Prevention reports that in the US in 2015, there were 146,571 "unintentional injury deaths" that year, the fourth leading cause of death. Of those, 47,478 were from unintentional poisoning, 37,757 were from traffic accidents, and 33,381 were from falls. Approximately 500,000 deaths due to drowning are reported annually, worldwide.

In a couple of countries, all accidental deaths (or apparently accidental deaths) are investigated by government bodies, and sometimes a family will do a private investigation. Inquests in England and Wales, for example, are held into sudden and unexplained deaths, and a fatal accident inquiry is performed for accidental death in Scotland. A verdict of "accidental death", in such cases, is returned when there is no contributory factor from an action or omission of the victim ("death by misadventure") or by another person ("unlawful killing").

Deaths during wartime, due to imprecise or incorrect targeting, may be euphemistically termed collateral damage, or the result of friendly fire.

== Deaths in workspaces ==
In 2024, 5,070 Total fatalities were recorded across all occupations, and 688,575 injury and illness reports were recorded. 93% of these recordings were injuries and 21% of those injuries reported as being treated in an emergency room. In total, approximately 75% of recorded injuries resulted in days away from work. The occupation with the highest number of injuries was Freight, Stock, and Material movers, composing 9.6% of all recorded injuries, whilst the lowest was Passenger Attendants, at 0.9% of recorded injuries.

Freight, Stock and Material moving jobs are often cited as being one of the most dangerous occupations due to the many indirect causes and environmental factors that increase the risk of injury and fatality drastically. This includes attempting to transport objects that are excessive in weight, constant repetitive stress across the body, moving improperly labeled or obscure loads or transport within hazardous environments. In total, 1,391 fatalities within these occupations were recorded in 2024, the highest amount of any occupation per person.

Logging is another occupation with a high number of accidental deaths per person. Logging has a mortality rate of 98.9 deaths per 100,000 workers, with the leading cause of death being contact with falling timber due to misjudgment of where trees will fall, or the lack of special awareness from workers. The second most common cause of death for loggers is due to misuse of equipment, such as leaving chainsaws turned on, or lack of proper maintenance.

Many of these deaths are not random occurrences, but commonly occur due to human error and misjudgment. In the case of Material movers, Ergonomic factors and learning proper body movement can significantly reduce the number of injuries and fatalities via limiting stress inflicted on the body, and for loggers, maintaining distance from potentially falling trees and branches, as well as routine maintenance to equipment is essential to worker safety.

== Deaths in public / residential spaces ==
The highest cause of accidental deaths within public spaces for the year 2024 was unintentional poisoning, causing 75,761 deaths, a mortality rate of 22.3 deaths per 100,000 people. The second highest was motor vehicle accidents, causing 41,241 deaths, with a mortality rate of 12.1 deaths per 100,000. Until 2011, Motor vehicle accidents were the leading cause of accidental death, before a surge in drug overdoses were recorded, whereas in the same period of time, motor vehicle accidents have trended downwards slightly due to improvements in safety technology, as well as reliability improvements due to improved computer technology.

The large increase in drug overdose related deaths began in 1999, as opioids began to be prescribed more commonly. This was followed by a large increase starting in 2010, due to the rise of heroin and synthetic opioid abuse. In 2023, over 100,000 deaths were caused by drug overdoses, with a third being from opioids. In 2022, the first recorded instance of overdose related deaths decreasing from prior years was recorded, decreasing by 12% for opioids, and 33% for heroin.

== See also ==
- Death by misadventure
- List of accidents and disasters by death toll
- Preventable causes of death
- List of unusual deaths
- Manslaughter
- Criminal negligence
- Wrongful death claim
