= Split Mountain (Wyoming) =

Mountain in Wyoming, United States

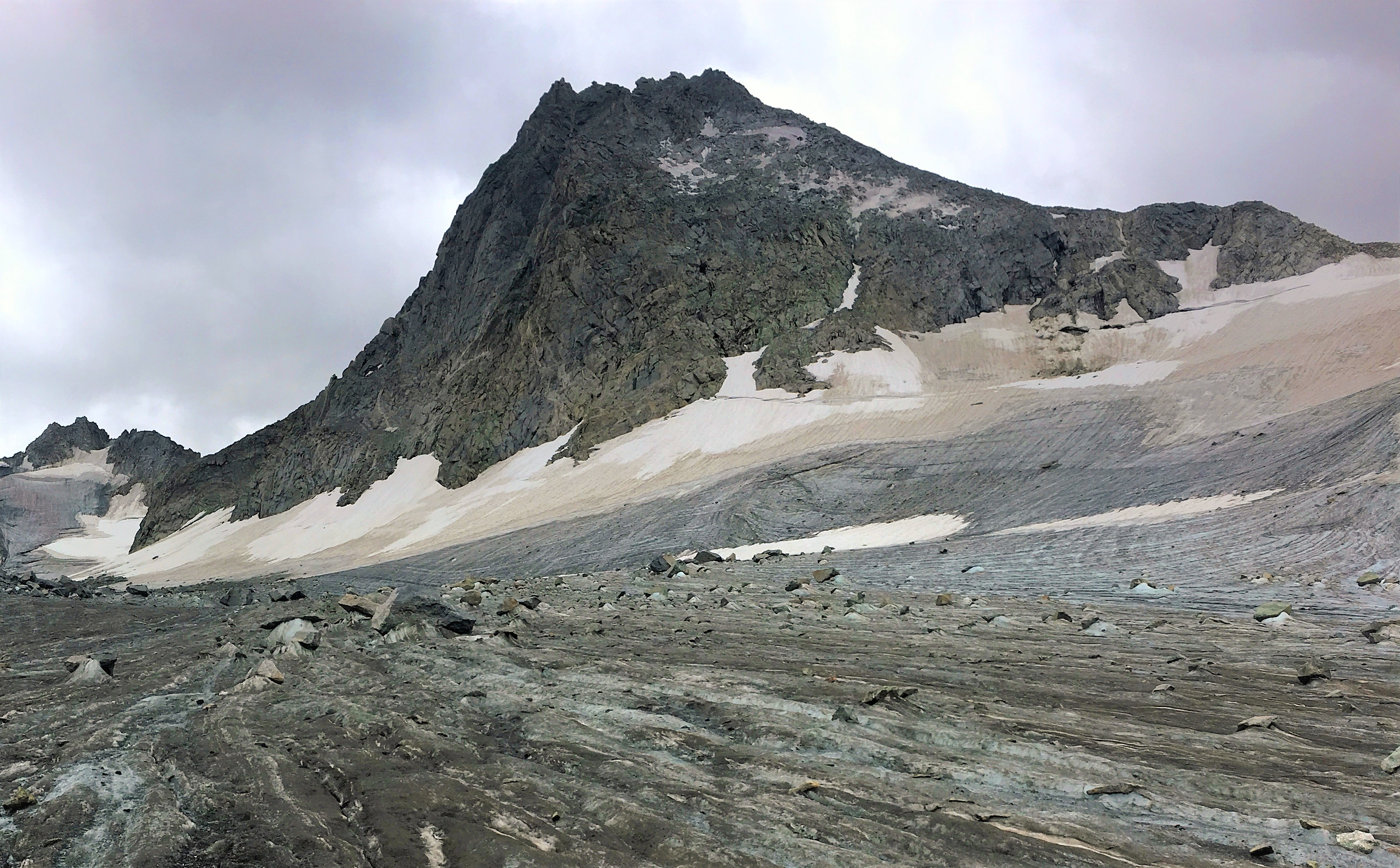
- North aspect rising above Mammoth Glacier

Highest point
- Elevation: 13,161 ft (4,011 m)
- Prominence: 595 ft (181 m)
- Coordinates: 43°09′51″N 109°40′21″W

Geography
- Location within Wyoming Location within the United States
- Location: Sublette County, Wyoming, Wyoming, U.S.
- Parent range: Wind River Range
- Topo map: USGS Gannett Peak

Geology
- Mountain type: Batholith

Climbing
- First ascent: 1931 (Gustav Koven, Theodore Koven and Paul Petzoldt)

Split Mountain (13,161 ft (4,011 m)) is located in the Wind River Range in the U.S. state of Wyoming. Split Mountain is the 22nd highest peak in Wyoming. Split Mountain is in the Bridger Wilderness of Bridger-Teton National Forest and is about .70 mi (1.13 km) northwest of Twin Peaks and 1 mi (1.6 km) southeast of Mount Whitecap. Mammoth Glacier is on the northeast slopes of the peak while the smaller Baby Glacier flows down from a spur to the northwest.

== Hazards ==
Encountering bears is a concern in the Wind River Range. There are other concerns as well, including bugs, wildfires, adverse snow conditions and nighttime cold temperatures.

Importantly, there have been notable incidents, including accidental deaths, due to falls from steep cliffs (a misstep could be fatal in this class 4/5 terrain) and due to falling rocks, over the years, including 1993, 2007 (involving an experienced NOLS leader), 2015 and 2018. Other incidents include a seriously injured backpacker being airlifted near SquareTop Mountain in 2005, and a fatal hiker incident (from an apparent accidental fall) in 2006 that involved state search and rescue. The U.S. Forest Service does not offer updated aggregated records on the official number of fatalities in the Wind River Range.
