= Ladd Peak =

Mountain in Wyoming, United States

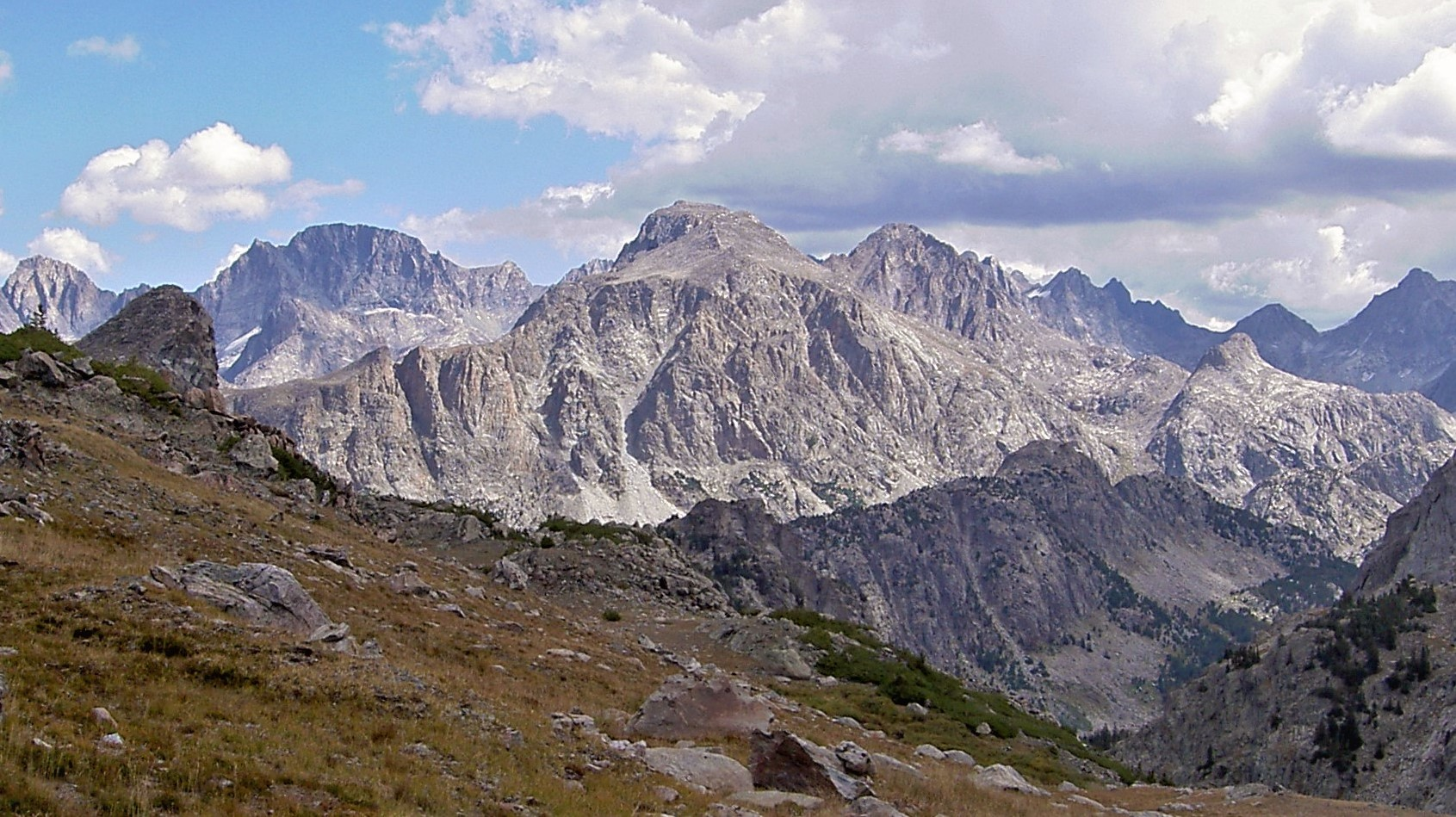
- West aspect, centered

Highest point
- Elevation: 12,967 ft (3,952 m)
- Prominence: 660 ft (201 m)
- Parent peak: Mount Whitecap (13,025 ft)
- Isolation: 0.66 mi (1.06 km)
- Coordinates: 43°10′30″N 109°42′08″W

Naming
- Etymology: Dr. William S. Ladd (1887–1949)

Geography
- Location within Wyoming Location within the United States
- Country: United States
- State: Wyoming
- County: Sublette
- Protected area: Bridger Wilderness
- Parent range: Rocky Mountains; Wind River Range
- Topo map: USGS Gannett Peak

Geology
- Rock type: granitic

Climbing
- First ascent: 1921
- Easiest route: class 3 scrambling East Ridge

Ladd Peak is a 12,967-foot-elevation (3,952-meter) mountain summit in Sublette County, Wyoming, United States.

== Description ==
Ladd Peak is located in the remote Wind River Range, which is a subrange of the Rocky Mountains. It is set 2.35 miles (3.78 km) west of the Continental Divide within the Bridger Wilderness, on land managed by Bridger-Teton National Forest. The nearest town is Pinedale, 23 miles (37 km) to the south-southwest. Ladd Peak ranks as the 40th-highest peak in Wyoming and is 2.5 miles (4.0 km) west of Gannett Peak, the highest peak in Wyoming. Precipitation runoff from the mountain drains into headwaters of the Green River. Topographic relief is significant as the summit rises nearly 3,600 feet (1,100 meters) above the river in 1.25 mile (2 km) and the 4,500-foot rise above Three Forks Park is the largest rise in the Wind River Range.

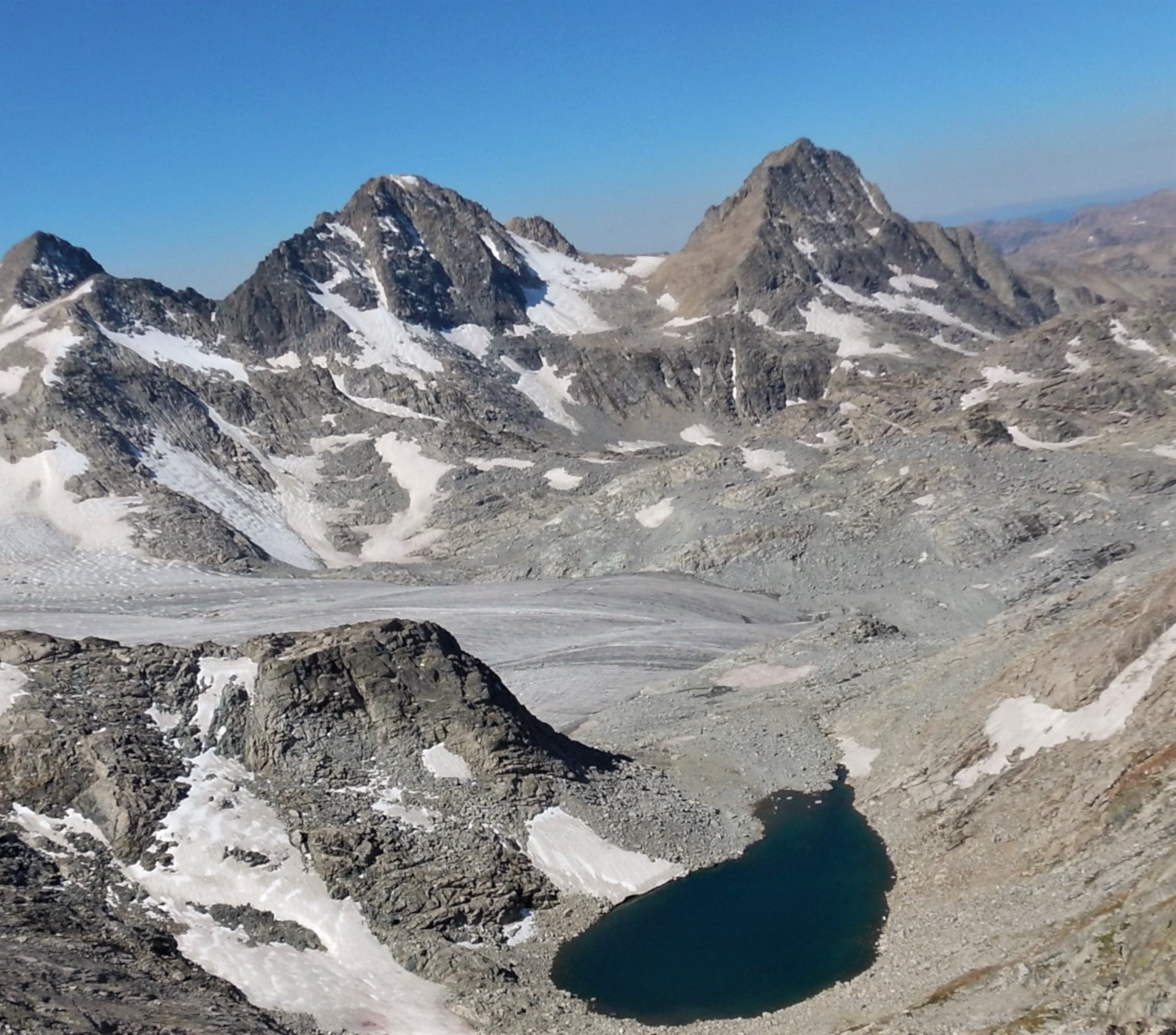
Mt. Whitecap (left) and Ladd Peak (right) from northeast. Mammoth Glacier below.

== History ==
The first ascent of the summit was made in 1921 by Dr. William S. Ladd, Evans Clark, Freda Kirchwey, and Dr. Adolf Schultz via the East Ridge. The North Couloir was first climbed in 1974 by Stan Hilbert and Bill March. The mountain's toponym has been officially adopted by the United States Board on Geographic Names.

== William S. Ladd ==
In addition to making the first ascent of this peak, Dr. Ladd is also credited with first ascents of Mount Saskatchewan and North Twin Peak in Canada. An avid mountaineer, he served as president of the American Alpine Club from 1929 through 1931. He was born in Portland, Oregon, on August 16, 1887, and died unexpectedly on September 17, 1949.

== Climate ==
According to the Köppen climate classification system, Ladd Peak is located in an alpine subarctic climate zone with long, cold, snowy winters, and cool to warm summers. Due to its altitude, it receives precipitation all year, as snow in winter and as thunderstorms in summer.

== Hazards ==
Encountering bears is a concern in the Wind River Range. There are other concerns as well, including bugs, wildfires, adverse snow conditions and nighttime cold temperatures.

Importantly, there have been notable incidents, including accidental deaths, due to falls from steep cliffs (a misstep could be fatal in this class 4/5 terrain) and due to falling rocks, over the years, including 1993, 2007 (involving an experienced NOLS leader), 2015 and 2018. Other incidents include a seriously injured backpacker being airlifted near Squaretop Mountain in 2005, and a fatal hiker incident (from an apparent accidental fall) in 2006 that involved state search and rescue. The U.S. Forest Service does not offer updated aggregated records on the official number of fatalities in the Wind River Range.

== See also ==
- List of mountain peaks of Wyoming
- Mountains of Sublette County, Wyoming
