= Twin Peaks (Wyoming) =

Mountain in Wyoming, United States

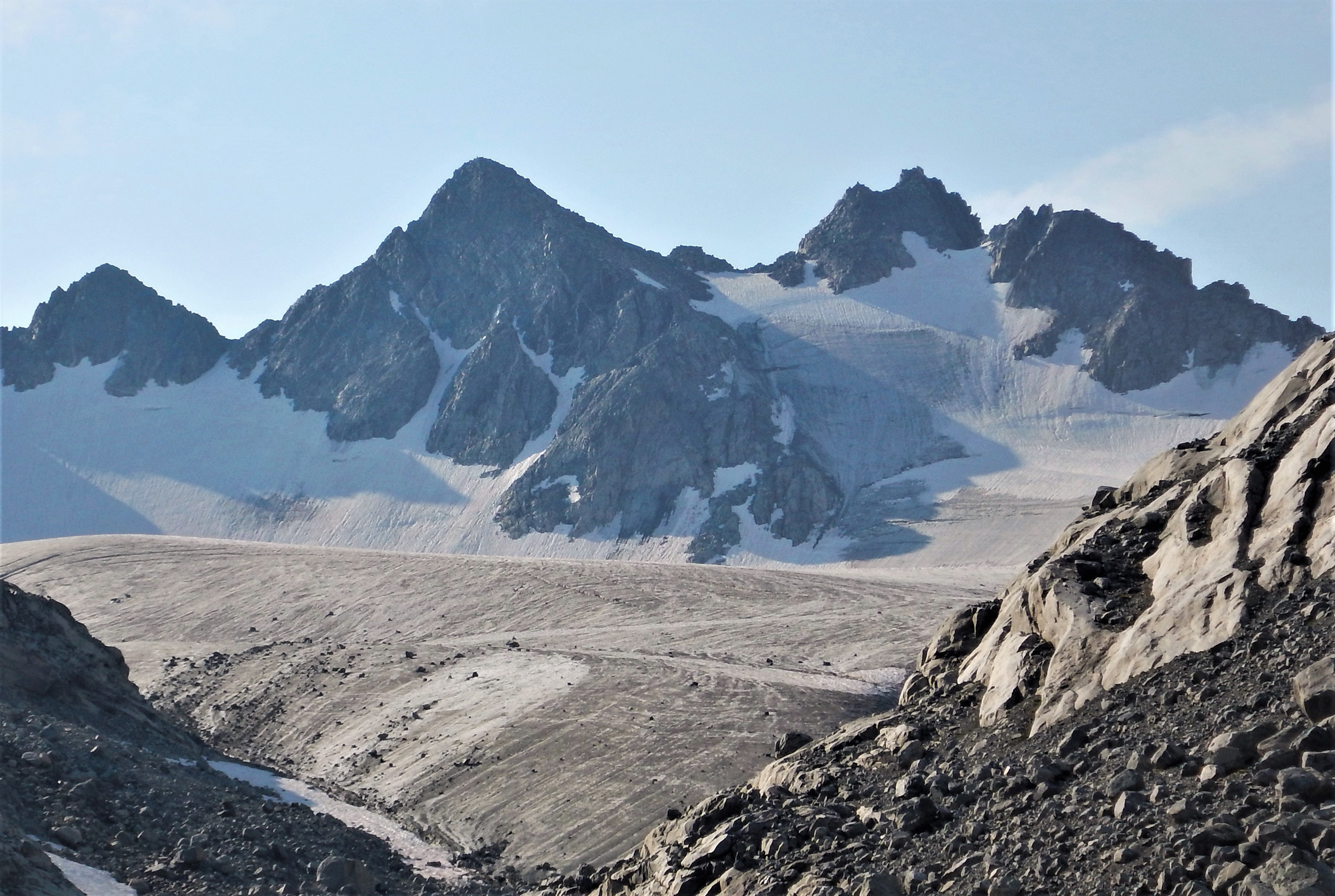
- North aspect above Mammoth Glacier

Highest point
- Elevation: 13,191 ft (4,021 m)
- Prominence: 385 ft (117 m)
- Coordinates: 43°09′36″N 109°39′31″W

Geography
- Location within Wyoming Location within the United States
- Location: Sublette County, Wyoming, Wyoming, U.S.
- Parent range: Wind River Range
- Topo map: USGS Gannett Peak

Geology
- Mountain type: Batholith

Climbing
- First ascent: 1930 (Henry Buchtel and Dudley Smith)

Twin Peaks (13,191 ft (4,021 m)) is located in the Wind River Range in the U.S. state of Wyoming. Twin Peaks is the 20th highest peak in Wyoming. Twin Peaks is in the Bridger Wilderness of Bridger–Teton National Forest and is 0.58 mi (0.93 km) southwest of Mount Woodrow Wilson and about the same distance southeast of Split Mountain. Mammoth Glacier flows from the north slopes of the peak while the smaller Twins Glacier flows to the southeast.

== Hazards ==
Encountering bears is a concern in the Wind River Range. There are other concerns as well, including bugs, wildfires, adverse snow conditions and nighttime cold temperatures.

There have been notable incidents, including accidental deaths, due to falls from steep cliffs (a misstep could be fatal in this class 4/5 terrain) and due to falling rocks, over the years, including 1993, 2007 (involving an experienced NOLS leader), 2015 and 2018. Other incidents include a seriously injured backpacker being airlifted near Squaretop Mountain in 2005, and a fatal hiker incident (from an apparent accidental fall) in 2006 that involved state search and rescue. The U.S. Forest Service does not offer updated aggregated records on the official number of fatalities in the Wind River Range.

== Climate ==
Climate data for East Twin Peak (WY) 43.1593 N, 109.6592 W, Elevation: 12,503 ft (3,811 m) (1991–2020 normals)
Month	Jan	Feb	Mar	Apr	May	Jun	Jul	Aug	Sep	Oct	Nov	Dec	Year
Mean daily maximum °F (°C)	19.2 (−7.1)	18.9 (−7.3)	24.4 (−4.2)	29.9 (−1.2)	38.8 (3.8)	49.3 (9.6)	58.9 (14.9)	57.6 (14.2)	48.9 (9.4)	36.4 (2.4)	24.9 (−3.9)	18.5 (−7.5)	35.5 (1.9)
Daily mean °F (°C)	9.4 (−12.6)	8.2 (−13.2)	13.0 (−10.6)	17.9 (−7.8)	26.6 (−3.0)	36.5 (2.5)	45.2 (7.3)	44.4 (6.9)	36.1 (2.3)	25.0 (−3.9)	15.2 (−9.3)	9.0 (−12.8)	23.9 (−4.5)
Mean daily minimum °F (°C)	−0.4 (−18.0)	−2.5 (−19.2)	1.6 (−16.9)	5.8 (−14.6)	14.4 (−9.8)	23.6 (−4.7)	31.5 (−0.3)	31.2 (−0.4)	23.4 (−4.8)	13.7 (−10.2)	5.6 (−14.7)	−0.5 (−18.1)	12.3 (−11.0)
Average precipitation inches (mm)	3.08 (78)	3.11 (79)	3.96 (101)	5.53 (140)	4.25 (108)	2.97 (75)	2.01 (51)	2.02 (51)	3.18 (81)	3.94 (100)	2.99 (76)	2.83 (72)	39.87 (1,012)
Source: PRISM Climate Group
