= White Rock (Wyoming) =

Cliff in the American state of Wyoming

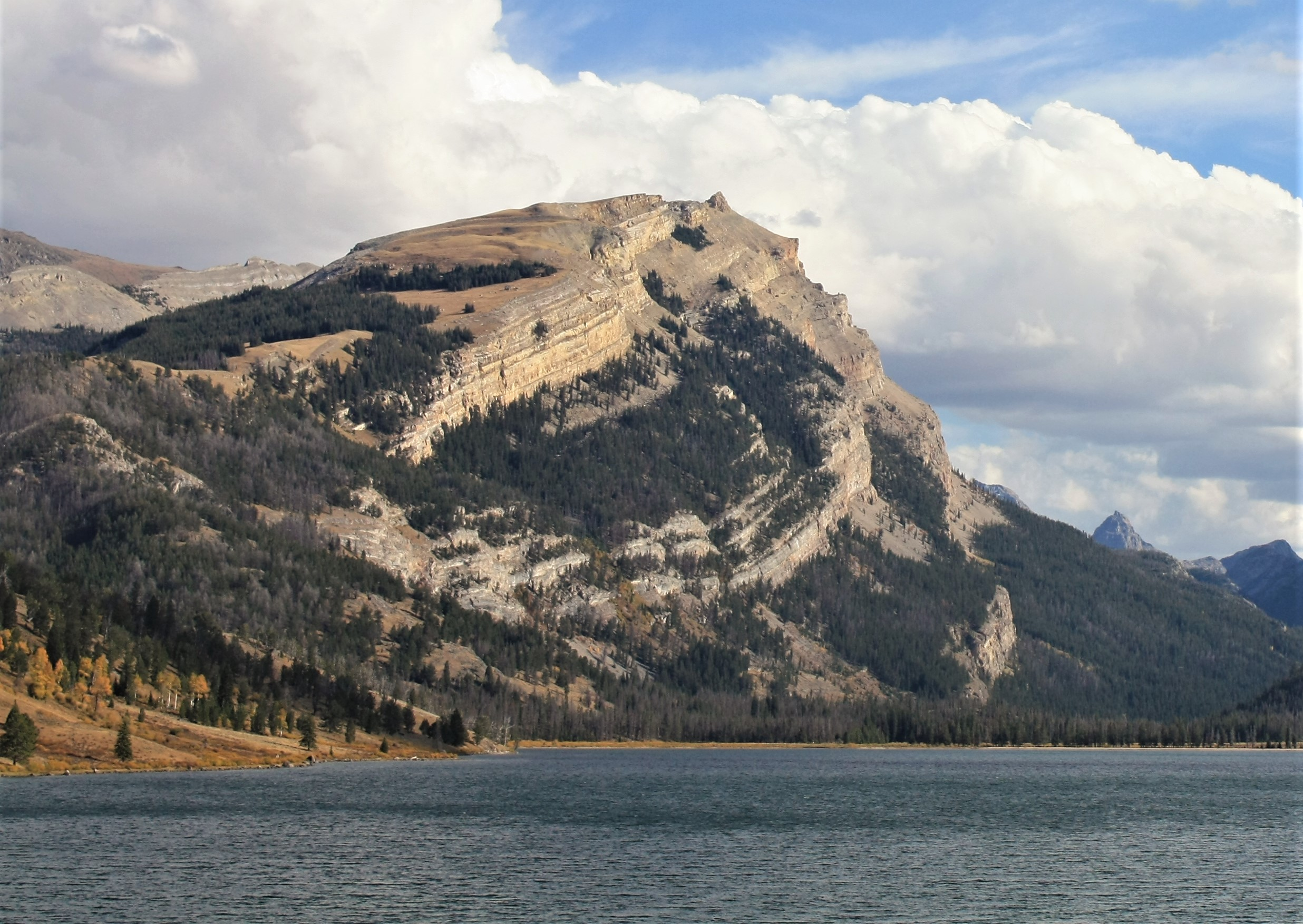
- Northwest aspect, from lower Green River Lakes

Highest point
- Elevation: 11,284 ft (3,439 m)
- Prominence: 244 ft (74 m)
- Parent peak: Lost Eagle Peak (11,860 ft)
- Isolation: 1.92 mi (3.09 km)
- Coordinates: 43°15′56″N 109°48′21″W

Geography
- Location within Wyoming Location within the United States
- Location: Sublette County, Wyoming, U.S.
- Parent range: Wind River Range
- Topo map: USGS Green River Lakes

Geology
- Rock age: Carboniferous
- Rock type(s): dolomite, limestone

Climbing
- Easiest route: class 2+ North ridge

White Rock is a cliff with an 11,284-foot-elevation (3,439-meter) summit located in Sublette County of Wyoming, United States.

== Description ==
This geographical feature is part of the remote Wind River Range and is situated six miles west of the Continental Divide. It is set in the Bridger Wilderness, on land managed by Bridger-Teton National Forest. Topographic relief is significant as the west aspect rises 3,300 feet (1,000 meters) above the Green River in approximately one mile. It is between Flat Top Mountain, 2.3 miles to the north-northeast, and Squaretop Mountain, 2.65 miles to the south. The iconic view of White Rock and Squaretop Mountain from Green River Lakes has been on the Wyoming licence plate since 2016.

== Geology ==
The mountain is composed of sedimentary rock that was laid down up to 450 million years ago in an ancient sea. The uppermost stratum is 300 million-year-old Madison Limestone, where seashell fossils are common. The cliff-forming limestone overlays a broken band of Darby Formation, which in turn overlays cliff-forming Bighorn Dolomite. The once sea-level strata were uplifted during the Laramide orogeny. Obsidian chippings have been found near the summit, suggesting the first ascent was possibly made by Native Americans.

== Climate ==
According to the Köppen climate classification system, White Rock is located in an alpine subarctic climate zone with long, cold, snowy winters, and cool to warm summers. Due to its altitude, it receives precipitation all year, as snow in winter, and as thunderstorms in summer. Precipitation runoff from the mountain drains into the Green River.

== Hazards ==
Encountering bears is a concern in the Wind River Range. There are other concerns as well, including bugs, wildfires, adverse snow conditions and nighttime cold temperatures.

Importantly, there have been notable incidents, including accidental deaths, due to falls from steep cliffs (a misstep could be fatal in this class 4/5 terrain) and due to falling rocks, over the years, including 1993, 2007 (involving an experienced NOLS leader), 2015 and 2018. Other incidents include a seriously injured backpacker being airlifted near Squaretop Mountain in 2005, and a fatal hiker incident (from an apparent accidental fall) in 2006 that involved state search and rescue. The U.S. Forest Service does not offer updated aggregated records on the official number of fatalities in the Wind River Range.

== Gallery ==
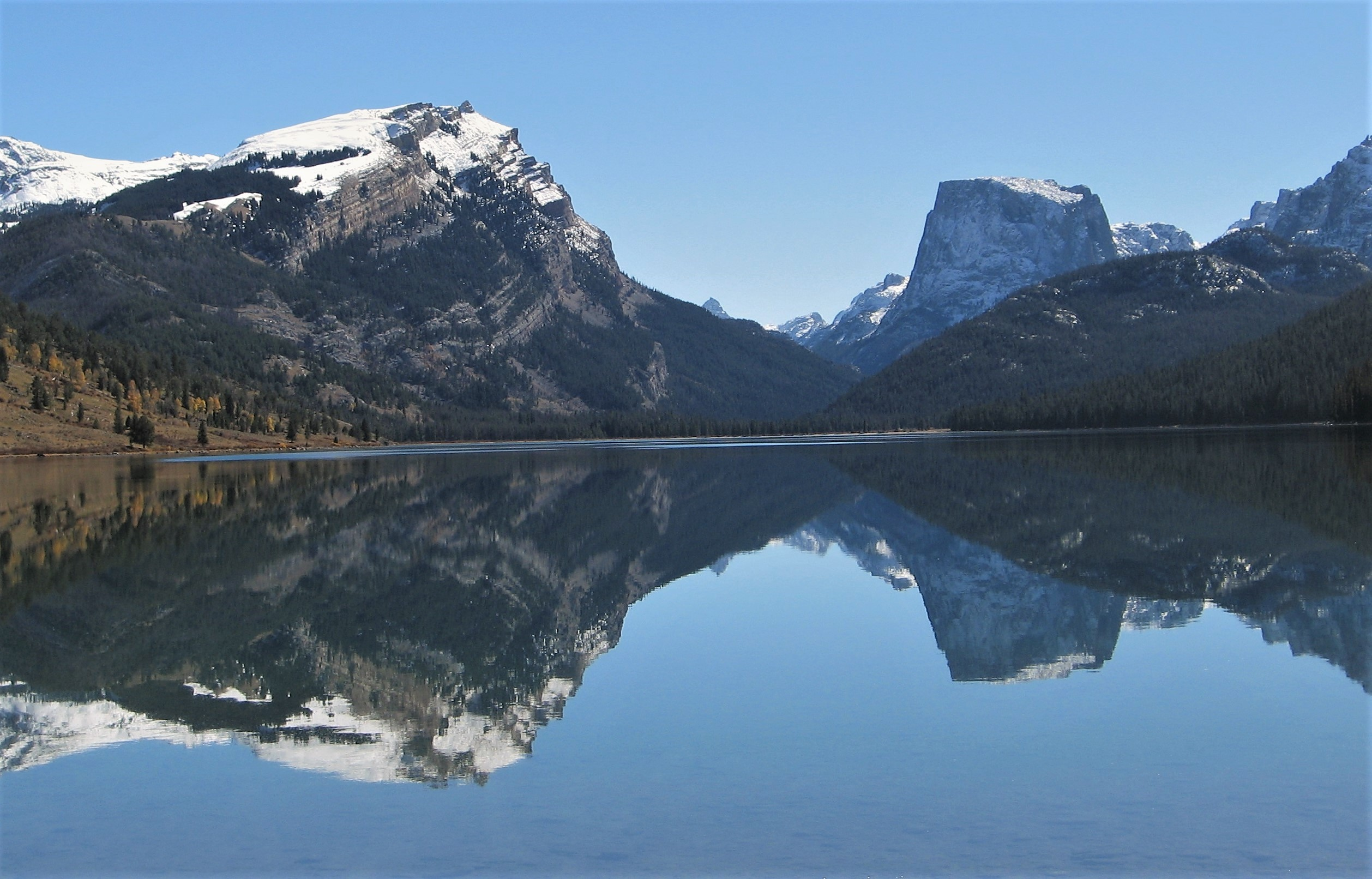
White Rock (left), Squaretop Mountain (right) reflected in Green River Lakes.
White Rock is a dolomite and limestone cliff that rises 3,300 feet above the lake.

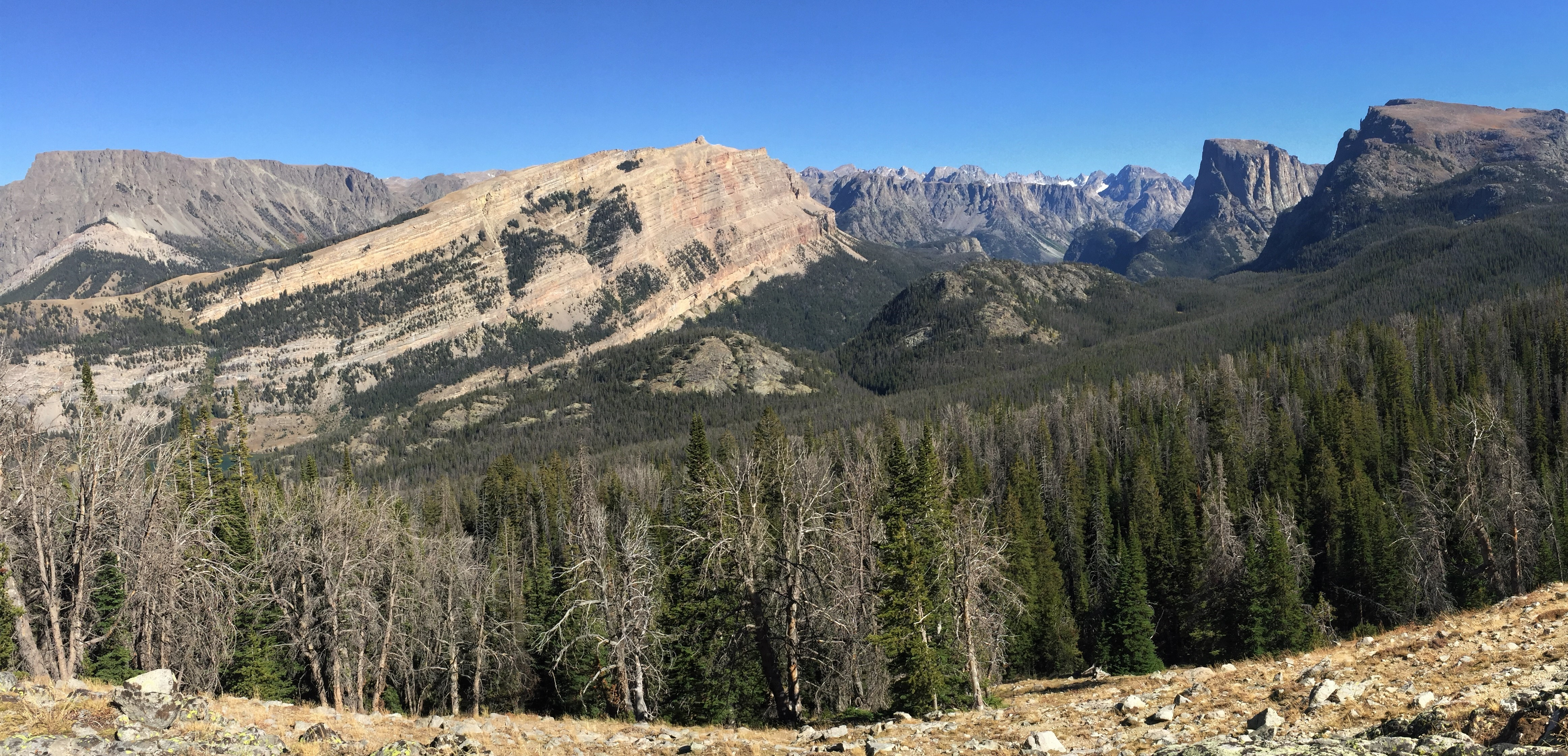
White Rock left of center

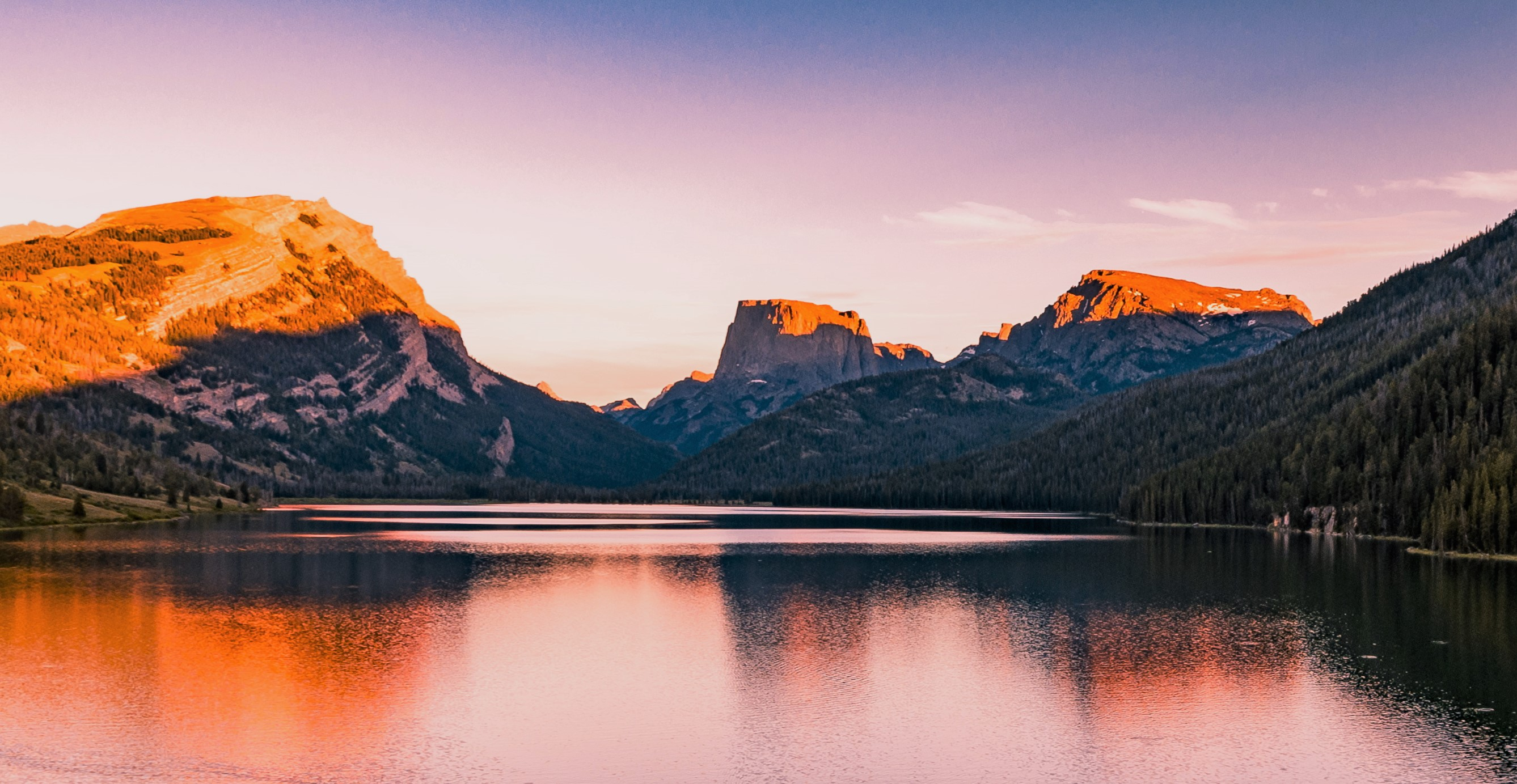
from Green River Lakes with White Rock on left, Squaretop in center, "Tabletop" on right

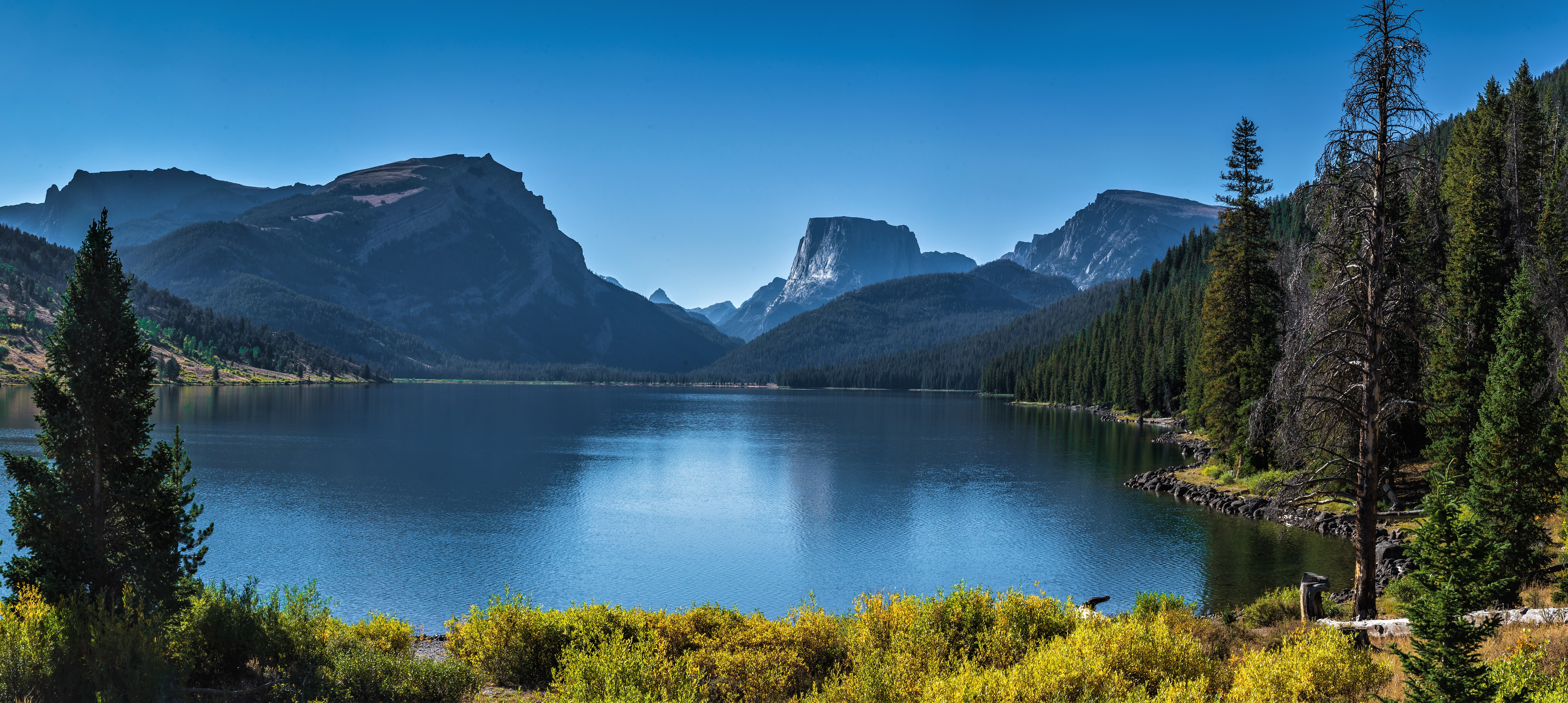
from Green River Lakes

== See also ==
- List of mountain peaks of Wyoming
