= Baby Glacier (Wyoming) =

Glacier in Wyoming, United States

- Location within Wyoming
- Type: Mountain glacier
- Location: Sublette County, Wyoming, USA
- Coordinates: 43°10′16″N 109°41′01″W
- Area: 50 acres (20 ha)
- Length: .40 mi (0.64 km)
- Width: .20 mi (0.32 km)
- Terminus: Talus
- Status: Unknown

Baby Glacier is in the Bridger Wilderness of Bridger-Teton National Forest, in the U.S. state of Wyoming. The glacier is immediately west of the much larger Mammoth Glacier, both of which are on the west side of the Continental Divide in the northern Wind River Range. The glacier occupies a north facing cirque and flows northward from the slopes of Mount Whitecap. Baby Glacier is in the Bridger Wilderness and is part of the largest grouping of glaciers in the American Rocky Mountains.

== Hazards ==
Encountering bears is a concern in the Wind River Range. There are other concerns as well, including bugs, wildfires, adverse snow conditions and nighttime cold temperatures.

Importantly, there have been notable incidents, including accidental deaths, due to falls from steep cliffs (a misstep could be fatal in this class 4/5 terrain) and due to falling rocks, over the years, including 1993, 2007 (involving an experienced NOLS leader), 2015 and 2018. Other incidents include a seriously injured backpacker being airlifted near SquareTop Mountain in 2005, and a fatal hiker incident (from an apparent accidental fall) in 2006 that involved state search and rescue. The U.S. Forest Service does not offer updated aggregated records on the official number of fatalities in the Wind River Range.

== See also ==
- List of glaciers in the United States
