= Vehicle registration plates of Wyoming =

Wyoming vehicle license plates

Wyoming
Current series
- Size: 12 in × 6 in 30 cm × 15 cm
- Material: Aluminum
- Serial format: 1-12345; 1-1234A; 1/0-12345 (county-coded)
- Introduced: June 2024

Availability
- Issued by: Wyoming Department of Transportation

History
- First issued: 1913

The U.S. state of Wyoming first required its residents to register their motor vehicles and display license plates in 1913. As of 2026, plates are issued and regulated by the Wyoming Department of Transportation through its Motor Vehicle Services division.

Wyoming license plates have included an image of a Bucking Horse and Rider since 1936.

Wyoming state law usually requires front and rear license plates. However, on July 1, 2015, a new law took effect that allowed custom and antique vehicles to display only rear plates, as well as vehicles that were originally manufactured without a plate bracket on the front.

== Passenger baseplates ==
=== 1913 to 1974 ===
In 1956, the United States, Canada, and Mexico came to an agreement with the American Association of Motor Vehicle Administrators, the Automobile Manufacturers Association and the National Safety Council that standardized the size for license plates for vehicles (except those for motorcycles) at 6 inches (15 cm) in height by 12 inches (30 cm) in width, with standardized mounting holes. The 1955 (dated 1956) issue was the first Wyoming license plate that complied with these standards.

No slogans were used on passenger plates during the period covered by this subsection.

| Image | Dates issued | Design | Serial format | Serials issued | Notes |
|---|---|---|---|---|---|
| | 1913 | Embossed red serial on white plate; "WYO" at bottom left with silver state seal above | 1234 | 1 to approximately 1600 | |
| | 1914 | Embossed white serial on blue plate; "WYO" at bottom left with silver state seal above | 1234 | 1 to approximately 2500 | |
| | 1915 | Embossed white serial on black plate; "WYO" at bottom left with embossed state seal above | 1234 | 1 to approximately 4000 | |
| | 1916 | Blue serial on white porcelain plate; "WYO." at bottom left with black state seal above | 1234 | 1 to approximately 7000 | Only porcelain plate. |
| | 1917 | Embossed brown serial on light yellow plate with border line; "WYO." at bottom left with silver state seal above | 12345 | 1 to approximately 12500 | |
| | 1918 | Embossed white serial on brown plate with border line; "1918 WYO." at left | 12345 | 1 to approximately 18000 | First dated plate. |
| 1919 Wyoming License Plate | 1919 | Embossed black serial on light green plate with border line; "1919 WYO" at left | 12345 | 1 to approximately 22000 | |
| | 1920–21 | Embossed white serial on dark green plate; "1920 WYO" at left | 12345 | 1 to approximately 30000 | Revalidated for 1921 with light green tabs. |
| 1921 Wyoming License Plate (Repainted) | 1921 | Embossed black serial on orange plate; "1921 WYO" at left | 12345 | 30001 to approximately 36500 | Issued only to new registrants. Serials continued from where the 1920–21 plates left off. |
| | 1922 | Embossed navy blue serial on cream plate; "1922 WYO" at left | 12345 | 1 to approximately 28000 | |
| | 1923 | Embossed white serial on navy blue plate; "WYO 1923" at left | 12345 | 1 to approximately 36000 | |
| | 1924 | Embossed white serial on red plate; "1924 WYO" at left | 12345 | 1 to approximately 39000 | |
| | 1925 | Embossed black serial on white plate; "1925 WYO" at left | 12345 | 1 to approximately 45000 | |
| | 1926 | Embossed white serial on green plate; white lines at top and bottom borders; "WYO 1926" at left | 12345 | 1 to approximately 45000 | |
| | 1927 | Embossed black serial on yellow plate; "1927 WYO" at left | 12345 | 1 to approximately 47000 | |
| | 1928 | Embossed yellow serial on navy blue plate; yellow lines at top and bottom borders; "WYO 1928" at left | 12345 | 1 to approximately 49000 | |
| | 1929 | Embossed red serial on white plate; red lines at top and bottom borders; "WYO 1929" at left | 12345 | 1 to approximately 52000 | |
| | 1930 | Embossed white serial on black plate; white lines at top and bottom borders; "WYOMING 1930" at bottom | 1-1234; 10-1234 | Coded by county of issuance (1 or 10) | First use of the full state name. |
| | 1931 | Embossed green serial on gray plate; green lines at top and bottom borders; "WYOMING 1931" at bottom | 1-1234; 10-1234 | Coded by county of issuance (1 or 10) | |
| | 1932 | Embossed cream serial on brown plate; cream lines at top and bottom borders; "WYOMING 1932" at bottom | 1-1234; 10-1234 | Coded by county of issuance (1 or 10) | |
| | 1933 | Embossed black serial on white plate; black lines at top and bottom borders; "WYOMING 1933" at bottom | 1-1234; 10-1234 | Coded by county of issuance (1 or 10) | |
| | 1934 | Embossed white serial on dark red plate; white lines at top and bottom borders; "WYOMING 1934" at bottom | 1-1234; 10-1234 | Coded by county of issuance (1 or 10) | |
| | 1935 | Embossed blue serial on white plate; blue lines at top and bottom borders; "WYOMING 1935" at bottom | 1-1234; 10-1234 | Coded by county of issuance (1 or 10) | |
| | 1936 | Embossed black serial and Bucking Horse and Rider on white plate with border line; "1936 WYOMING" at top | 1-1234; 10-1234 | Coded by county of issuance (1 or 10) | First use of the Bucking Horse and Rider. |
| | 1937 | Embossed yellow serial and Bucking Horse and Rider on brown plate with border line; "1937 WYOMING" at top | 1-1234; 10-1234 | Coded by county of issuance (1 or 10) | Issued in the colors of the University of Wyoming, in honor of its 50th anniversary. |
| | 1938 | Embossed yellow serial and Bucking Horse and Rider on navy blue plate with border line; "1938 WYOMING" at top | 1-1234; 10-1234 | Coded by county of issuance (1 or 10) | |
| | 1939 | Embossed navy blue serial and Bucking Horse and Rider on golden yellow plate with border line; "1939 WYOMING" at bottom | 1-1234; 10-1234 | Coded by county of issuance (1 or 10) | |
| | 1940 | Embossed white serial and Bucking Horse and Rider on turquoise plate with border line; "1940 WYOMING" at top | 1-1234; 10-1234 | Coded by county of issuance (1 or 10) | |
| | 1941 | Embossed red serial and Bucking Horse and Rider on white plate with border line; "1941 WYOMING" at top | 1-1234; 2-A123; 10-1234 | Coded by county of issuance (1 or 10) | One-letter, three-digit serials issued in Laramie County after 2-9999 was reached. This occurred again in 1942. |
| | 1942 | Embossed black serial and Bucking Horse and Rider on white plate with border line; "1942 WYOMING" at top | 1-1234; 2-A123; 10-1234 | Coded by county of issuance (1 or 10) | |
| | 1943 | Embossed golden yellow serial and Bucking Horse and Rider on black plate with border line; "1943 WYOMING" at top | 1-12345; 10-1234 | Coded by county of issuance (1 or 10) | Five-digit serials issued in Laramie County after 2-9999 was reached; this occurred on each subsequent base through 1955. Natrona County followed suit from 1949. |
| | 1944 | Black serial and Bucking Horse and Rider on golden yellow fiberboard plate with border line; "1944 WYOMING" at top | 1-12345; 10-1234 | Coded by county of issuance (1 or 10) | Manufactured on soybean-based fiberboard due to metal conservation for World War II. |
| | 1945 | Embossed black serial and Bucking Horse and Rider on white plate with border line; "1945 WYOMING" at top | 1-12345; 10-1234 | Coded by county of issuance (1 or 10) | |
| | 1946 | Embossed green serial and Bucking Horse and Rider on beige plate with border line; "1946 WYOMING" at top | 1-12345; 10-1234 | Coded by county of issuance (1 or 10) | |
| | 1947 | Embossed white serial and Bucking Horse and Rider on black plate with border line; "1947 WYOMING" at top | 1-12345; 10-1234 | Coded by county of issuance (1 or 10) | |
| | 1948 | Embossed brown serial and Bucking Horse and Rider on golden yellow plate with border line; "1948 WYOMING" at top | 1-12345; 10-1234 | Coded by county of issuance (1 or 10) | |
| | 1949 | Embossed red serial and Bucking Horse and Rider on white plate with border line; "1949 WYOMING" at bottom | 1-12345; 10-1234 | Coded by county of issuance (1 or 10) | |
| | 1950 | Embossed white serial and Bucking Horse and Rider on black plate with border line; "1950 WYOMING" at top | 1-12345; 10-1234 | Coded by county of issuance (1 or 10) | |
| | 1951 | Embossed black serial and Bucking Horse and Rider on white plate with border line; "1951 WYOMING" at top | 1-12345; 10-1234 | Coded by county of issuance (1 or 10) | |
| | 1952 | Embossed yellow serial and Bucking Horse and Rider on black plate with border line; "52 WYOMING" at bottom | 1-12345; 10-1234 | Coded by county of issuance (1 or 10) | |
| | 1953 | Embossed white serial and Bucking Horse and Rider on black plate with white border line; "53 WYOMING" at bottom | 1-12345; 10-1234 | Coded by county of issuance (1 or 10) | |
| | 1954 | Embossed black serial and Bucking Horse and Rider on white plate with border line; "54 WYOMING" at bottom | 1-12345; 10-1234 | Coded by county of issuance (1 or 10) | |
| 1955 Wyoming License Plate | 1955 | Embossed yellow serial and Bucking Horse and Rider on black plate with border line; "55 WYOMING" at top | 1-12345; 10-1234 | Coded by county of issuance (1 or 10) | |
| | 1956 | Embossed white serial and Bucking Horse and Rider on black plate with border line; "56 WYOMING" at bottom | 1-1234; 1-123A; 1/0-1234 | Coded by county of issuance (1 or 1/0) | First 6" x 12" plate. Stacked county codes introduced in two-digit counties; all serials restricted to four characters in length. |
| 1957 Wyoming License Plate | 1957 | Embossed yellow serial and Bucking Horse and Rider on black plate with border line; "WYO 57" at top right | 1-1234; 1-123A; 1/0-1234 | Coded by county of issuance (1 or 1/0) | |
| | 1958 | Embossed yellow serial and Bucking Horse and Rider on green plate with border line; "WYO 58" at bottom right | 1-1234; 1-123A; 1/0-1234 | Coded by county of issuance (1 or 1/0) | |
| | 1959 | Embossed white serial and Bucking Horse and Rider on black plate with border line; "WYO 59" at top right | 1-1234; 1-123A; 1/0-1234 | Coded by county of issuance (1 or 1/0) | |
| | 1960 | Embossed yellow serial and Bucking Horse and Rider on black plate with border line; "WYO 60" at bottom right | 1-1234; 1-123A; 1/0-1234 | Coded by county of issuance (1 or 1/0) | |
| | 1961 | Embossed white serial and Bucking Horse and Rider on red plate with border line; "WYO 61" at top right | 1-1234; 1-123A; 1/0-1234; 1/0-123A | Coded by county of issuance (1 or 1/0) | |
| | 1962 | Embossed white serial and Bucking Horse and Rider on Columbia blue plate with border line; "WYO 62" at bottom right | 1-1234; 1-123A; 1/0-1234; 1/0-123A | Coded by county of issuance (1 or 1/0) | |
| | 1963 | Embossed white serial and Bucking Horse and Rider on black plate with border line; "WYO 63" at top right | 1-1234; 1-123A; 1/0-1234; 1/0-123A | Coded by county of issuance (1 or 1/0) | |
| | 1964 | Embossed white serial and Bucking Horse and Rider on red plate with border line; "WYO 64" at bottom right | 1-1234; 1-123A; 1-A123; 1/0-1234; 1/0-123A | Coded by county of issuance (1 or 1/0) | |
| | 1965 | Embossed yellow serial and Bucking Horse and Rider on black plate with border line; "WYO 65" at top right | 1-1234; 1-123A; 1-A123; 1/0-1234; 1/0-123A | Coded by county of issuance (1 or 1/0) | |
| | 1966 | Embossed white serial and Bucking Horse and Rider on dark green plate with border line; "WYO 66" at bottom right | 1-1234; 1-123A; 1-A123; 1/0-1234; 1/0-123A | Coded by county of issuance (1 or 1/0) | |
| | 1967 | Embossed white serial and Bucking Horse and Rider on red plate with border line; "WYO 67" at top right | 1-1234; 1-123A; 1-A123; 1/0-1234; 1/0-123A | Coded by county of issuance (1 or 1/0) | |
| | 1968 | Embossed yellow serial and Bucking Horse and Rider on brown plate with border line; "WYO 68" at bottom right | 1-1234; 1-123A; 1-A123; 1/0-1234; 1/0-123A | Coded by county of issuance (1 or 1/0) | |
| | 1969 | Embossed white serial and Bucking Horse and Rider on dark blue plate with border line; "WYO 69" at top right | 1-1234; 1-123A; 1-A123; 1/0-1234; 1/0-123A | Coded by county of issuance (1 or 1/0) | |
| | 1970 | Embossed yellow serial and Bucking Horse and Rider on dark green plate with border line; "WYO 70" at bottom right | 1-1234; 1-123A; 1-A123; 1/0-1234; 1/0-123A | Coded by county of issuance (1 or 1/0) | |
| | 1971 | Embossed white serial and Bucking Horse and Rider on black plate with border line; "WYO 71" at top right | 1-1234; 1-123A; 1-A123; 1/0-1234; 1/0-123A | Coded by county of issuance (1 or 1/0) | |
| | 1972 | Embossed brown serial and Bucking Horse and Rider on yellow plate with border line; "WYO 72" at bottom right | 1-1234; 1-123A; 1-A123; 1/0-1234; 1/0-123A | Coded by county of issuance (1 or 1/0) | Awarded "Plate of the Year" for best new license plate of 1972 by the Automobile License Plate Collectors Association, the first time Wyoming was so honored. |
| | 1973 | Embossed black serial and Bucking Horse and Rider on white plate with border line; "WYO 73" at top right | 1-1234; 1-123A; 1-A123; 1/0-1234; 1/0-123A | Coded by county of issuance (1 or 1/0) | |
| | 1974 | As 1972 base, but with "WYO 74" at bottom right | 1-1234; 1-123A; 1-A123; 1/0-1234; 1/0-123A | Coded by county of issuance (1 or 1/0) | |

=== 1975 to present ===
| Image | Dates issued | Design | Slogan | Serial format | Serials issued | Notes |
|---|---|---|---|---|---|---|
| 1975-1977 Wyoming License Plate | 1975–77 | Embossed light blue serial and screened light blue Bucking Horse and Rider on white plate with light blue border line; red band screened at bottom containing "19 WYOMING 75" in white | "THE SPIRIT OF '76 — In the American West!" screened in red Wild West-style font centered at top | 1-1234; 1-123A; 1-A123; 1-A/B123; 1/0-1234; 1/0-123A | Coded by county of issuance (1 or 1/0) | Revalidated for 1976 and 1977 with stickers. Five-character serials, with two stacked letters, issued in Laramie and Natrona Counties from 1977 after four-character serials were exhausted. |
| 1979-1982 Wyoming License Plate | 1978–82 | Embossed brown serial and Bucking Horse and Rider on white plate; brown wooden fence graphic screened at bottom; "WYOMING" screened in Wild West-style font on wooden sign graphic at top, offset to right; "78" screened in same manner at top left | none | 1-1234; 1-123A/B; 1/0-1234; 1/0-123A/B | Coded by county of issuance (1 or 1/0) | Awarded "Plate of the Year" for best new license plate of 1978 by the Automobile License Plate Collectors Association, the second time Wyoming was so honored. |
| 1983-1987 Wyoming License Plate | 1983 – December 1987 | Embossed brown serial and screened brown Bucking Horse and Rider on yellow plate; brown wooden fence graphic screened at bottom; "WYOMING" screened in brown at top, offset to right; "83" screened at top left | none | 1-1234; 1-123A/B; 1/0-1234; 1/0-123A/B | Coded by county of issuance (1 or 1/0) | |
| | January 1988 – December 1992 | Embossed red serial and Bucking Horse and Rider on graphic plate featuring white cloud-covered mountains against a blue sky; "Wyoming" screened in dark blue at top, offset to right | "1890 Centennial 1990" screened in dark blue at bottom | 1-1234; 1-123A/B; 1/0-1234; 1/0-123A/B | Coded by county of issuance (1 or 1/0) | Commemorated Wyoming's 100 years of statehood. |
| | January 1993 – December 1999 | Embossed dark blue serial and Bucking Horse and Rider on graphic plate with blue, green and yellow mountains against a pale blue sky; "Wyoming" screened in dark blue at top, offset to right | none | 1-1234; 1-123A/B; 1/0-1234; 1/0-123A/B | Coded by county of issuance (1 or 1/0) | |
| | January 2000 – early 2005 | Embossed black serial and Bucking Horse and Rider on graphic plate with Devils Tower screened at right against a cloudy blue sky; "WYOMING" screened in white at bottom, offset to right | none | 1-1234; 1-123A; 1-12AB; 1-1ABC; 1/0-1234; 1/0-123A; 1/0-12AB | Coded by county of issuance (1 or 1/0) | Awarded "Plate of the Year" for best new license plate of 2000 by the Automobile License Plate Collectors Association, the third time Wyoming was so honored. |
| | October 2001 – December 2008 | As above, but with serial and Bucking Horse and Rider screened rather than embossed | none | 1-1234; 1-123A; 1-12AB; 1-1ABC; 1/0-1234; 1/0-123A; 1/0-12AB | Coded by county of issuance (1 or 1/0) | Bucking Horse and Rider originally the same shape as on embossed plates, but later given greater detail. Each county started issuing screened plates after exhausting their supplies of embossed plates. |
| | January 2008 – December 2016 | Screened black serial and Bucking Horse and Rider on graphic plate featuring the Teton Range, with cloudy blue sky above and green forest below; "WYOMING" screened in white centered at bottom | none | 1-12345; 1-1234A; 10-12345 | Coded by county of issuance (1 or 10) | Full-size county codes for two-digit counties, and serials with five full-size characters, used for the first time since 1955. Issued only to 2-year registrants in 2008, all remaining motorists received the plate during 2009, replacing the previous base by the end of the year. |
| | January 2016 – December 2024 | Screened black serial and Bucking Horse and Rider on graphic plate featuring the Green River Lakes and Squaretop Mountain against a cloudy blue sky; golden yellow rope border around plate; "WYOMING" screened in yellow centered at top | none | 1-12345; 1-1234A; 1/0-12345 | Coded by county of issuance (1 or 1/0) | Issued only to 2-year registrants in 2016. All remaining motorists received the plate during 2017, replacing the previous base by the end of the year. |
| | June 2024 – present | Screened white serial and Bucking Horse and Rider on on navy blue and gray graphic of the state flag; red and white border around plate; "WYOMING" screened navy blue outlined in white centered at top. | "travelwyoming.com" screened at bottom center; "That's WY" screened at bottom right | 1A-123A; 1/0A-123A 1A-1234 (Note: Reserved for existing holders of numbers containing four digits of less); 1/0A-1234 | Coded by county of issuance and vehicle type (1A or 1/0A) | Available for 2-year registrants in 2024. Will replace all previous plates during 2025. |

== Non-passenger plates ==
First issued in 2008.

| Image | Type | Design | Serial format | Notes |
|---|---|---|---|---|
| | Apportioned | As Teton Range passenger base; "APPORTIONED" at top | A12345 | |
| | Apportioned Trailer | As Teton Range passenger base; "APPORTIONED" at top | T/R/L A12345 | No Bucking Horse and Rider. |
| | Commercial | As Teton Range passenger base; "COMMERCIAL" at top | 1-1234; 10-1234; Coded by county of issuance (1 or 10) | |
| | Exempt – City | As Teton Range passenger base; "EXEMPT" at top | C/I/T/Y-1234 | |
| | Exempt – County | As Teton Range passenger base; "EXEMPT" at top | C/O-1234 | |
| | Exempt – State | As Teton Range passenger base; "EXEMPT" at top | S-1234 | |
| | Exempt – University of Wyoming | As Teton Range passenger base; "EXEMPT" at top | U/W-123 | |
| | Multi-purpose Vehicle (MPV) | As Green River and Squaretop Mountain passenger base; "MPV" at top with orange border | 1-1234; 10-1234; Coded by county of issuance (1 or 10) | No Bucking Horse and Rider. |
| | Truck | As Teton Range passenger base; "TRUCK" at top | 1-12345; 10-12345; Coded by county of issuance (1 or 10) | |

=== Previous non-passenger plates ===
| Image | Type | First issued | Design | Serial format | Notes |
|---|---|---|---|---|---|
| | House Trailer | 1993 | As 1993 passenger base, but without Bucking Horse and Rider; "HOUSE TRL" embossed at bottom | 1 H/T 1234; 1/0 H/T 1234; Coded by county of issuance (1 or 1/0) | |

== Specialty plates ==
First issued in 2017 (except for the Wildlife Conservation plate).

| Image | Type | Design | Serial format | Notes |
|---|---|---|---|---|
| | Amateur Radio | As Squaretop Mountain passenger base; "AMATEUR RADIO" at bottom | FCC call sign | |
| | Disabled Veteran | As Squaretop Mountain passenger base; national flag at left and "DISABLED VETERAN" at bottom | D/V1234 | |
| | Emergency Medical Technician | As Squaretop Mountain passenger base; Star of Life at left and "EMERGENCY MED TECH" at bottom | E/T1234 | |
| | Firefighter | As Squaretop Mountain passenger base; firefighter badge at left and "FIRE FIGHTER" at bottom | F/F1234 | |
| | Gold Star Family | As Squaretop Mountain passenger base; Gold Star graphic and "REMEMBER THE FALLEN" over national flag at left and "GOLD STAR FAMILY" at bottom | G/S1234 | |
| | National Guard | As Squaretop Mountain passenger base; Wyoming Military Department logo at left and "NATIONAL GUARD" at bottom | N/G1234 | |
| | Pearl Harbor Survivor | As Squaretop Mountain passenger base; national flag at left and "PEARL HARBOR SURVIVOR" at bottom | P/S1234 | |
| | Pioneer | Screened white on black; "PIONEER" at top, offset to right | W/Y/O-1234 | |
| | Prestige | As Squaretop Mountain passenger base | County code followed by any acceptable combination of up to five letters and numbers, personalized by owner | |
| | Prisoner of War | As Squaretop Mountain passenger base; POW-MIA badge at left and "PRISONER OF WAR" at bottom | P/W1234 | |
| | Purple Heart Recipient | As Squaretop Mountain passenger base; Purple Heart medal graphic at left and "COMBAT WOUNDED" at bottom | P/H1234 | |
| | University of Wyoming | Screened brown on gold; "UNIVERSITY OF WYOMING" at bottom | 1-1234; 1/0-1234; Coded by county of issuance (1 or 1/0) | 'A' type code between county code and Bucking Horse and Rider. |
| | Veteran | As Squaretop Mountain passenger base; seal of branch of service over national flag at left and "VETERAN" at bottom | A/F1234 (Air Force); A/R1234 (Army); C/G1234 (Coast Guard); M/C1234 (Marine Corps); M/M1234 (Merchant Marine); N/A1234 (Navy) | |
| | Wildlife Conservation | Screened yellow on graphic plate featuring mule deer in grass; "WILDLIFE CONSERVATION" at bottom | W/C1234 | Introduced January 2019. |

== County codes ==
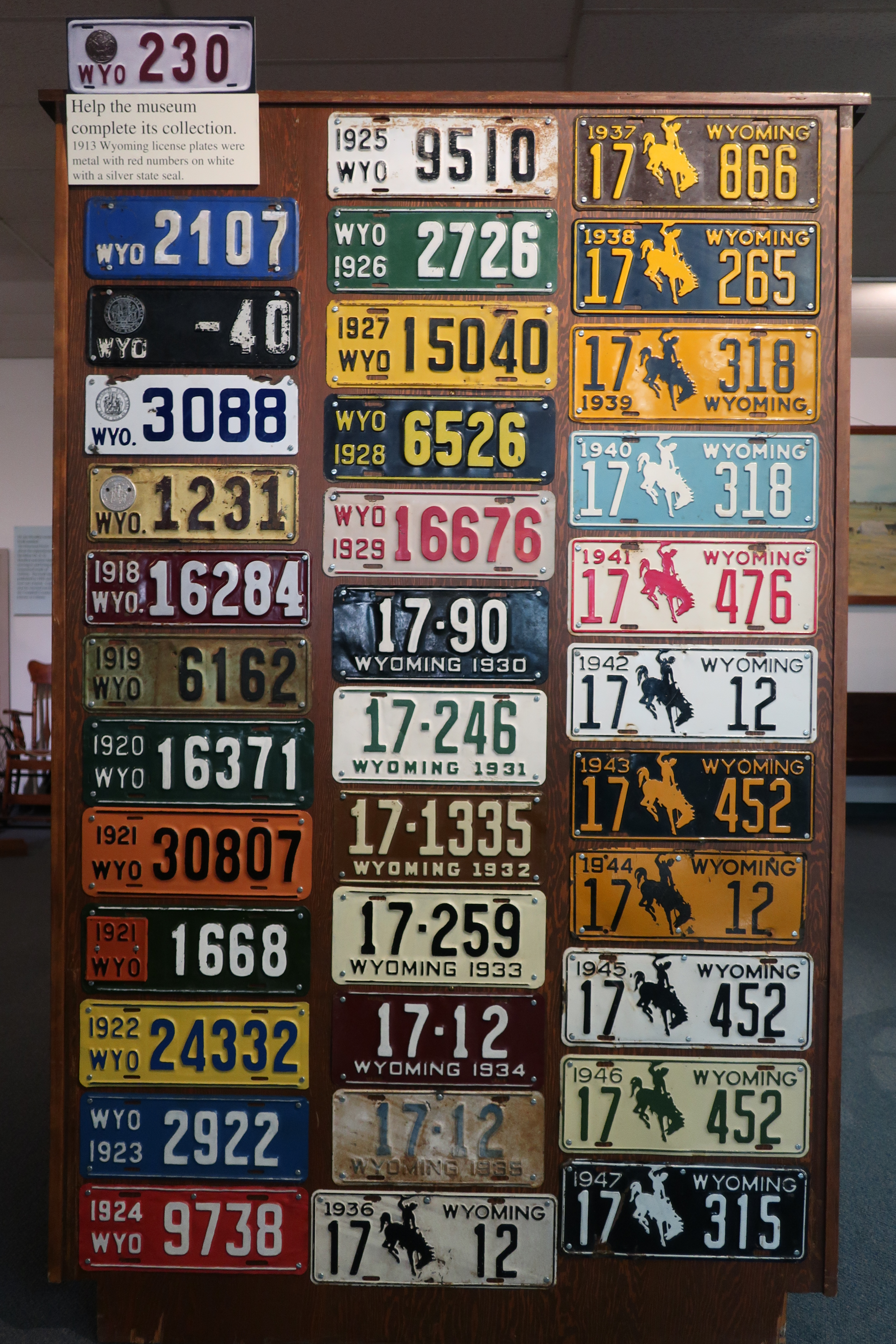
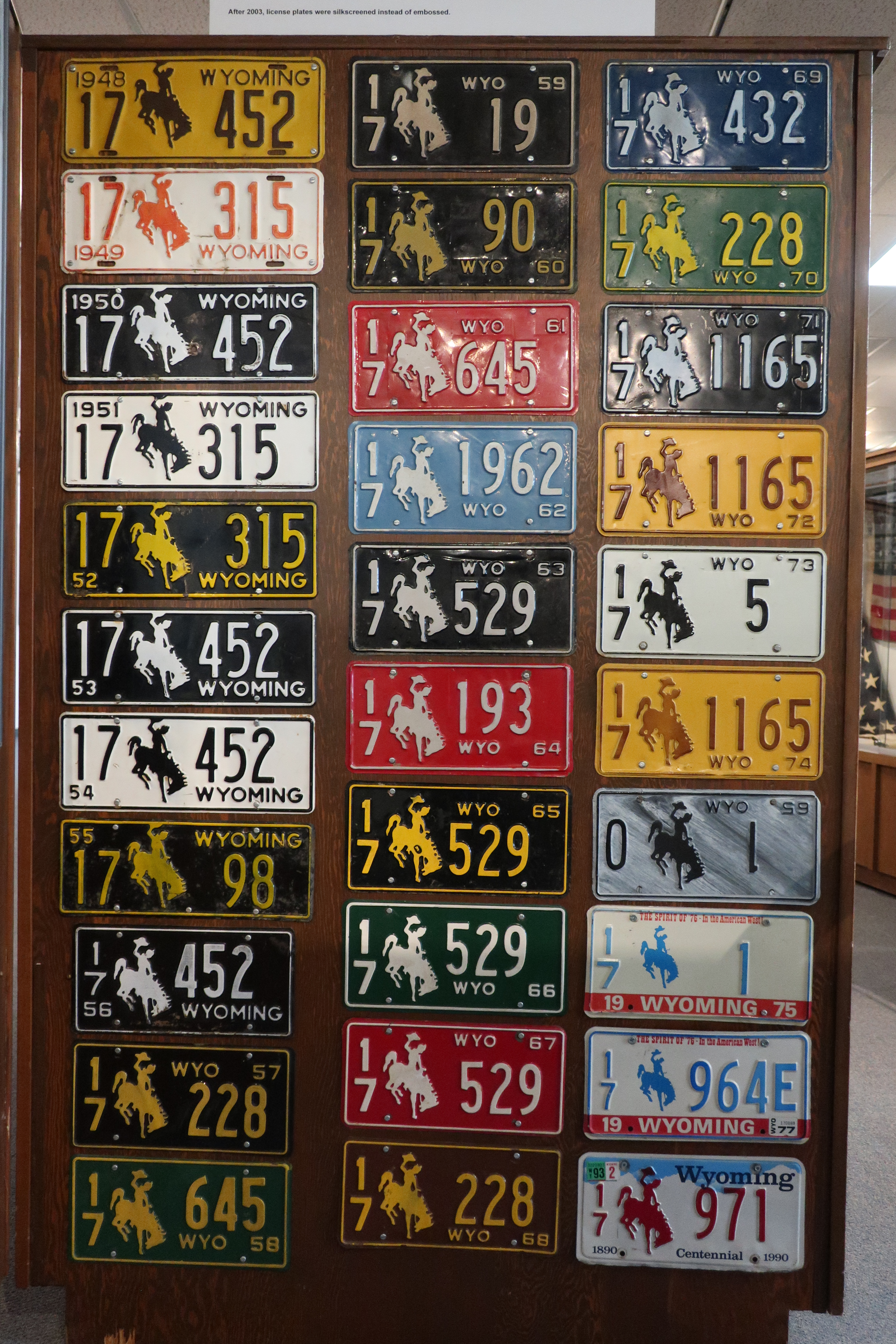
Campbell County license plates on display at Campbell County Rockpile Museum in Gillette

| Code | County |
|---|---|
| 1 | Natrona |
| 2 | Laramie |
| 3 | Sheridan |
| 4 | Sweetwater |
| 5 | Albany |
| 6 | Carbon |
| 7 | Goshen |
| 8 | Platte |
| 9 | Big Horn |
| 10 | Fremont |
| 11 | Park |
| 12 | Lincoln |
| 13 | Converse |
| 14 | Niobrara |
| 15 | Hot Springs |
| 16 | Johnson |
| 17 | Campbell |
| 18 | Crook |
| 19 | Uinta |
| 20 | Washakie |
| 21 | Weston |
| 22 | Teton |
| 23 | Sublette |
| 99 | Rental vehicle |
