= Squaretop Mountain =

Mountain in the American state of Wyoming

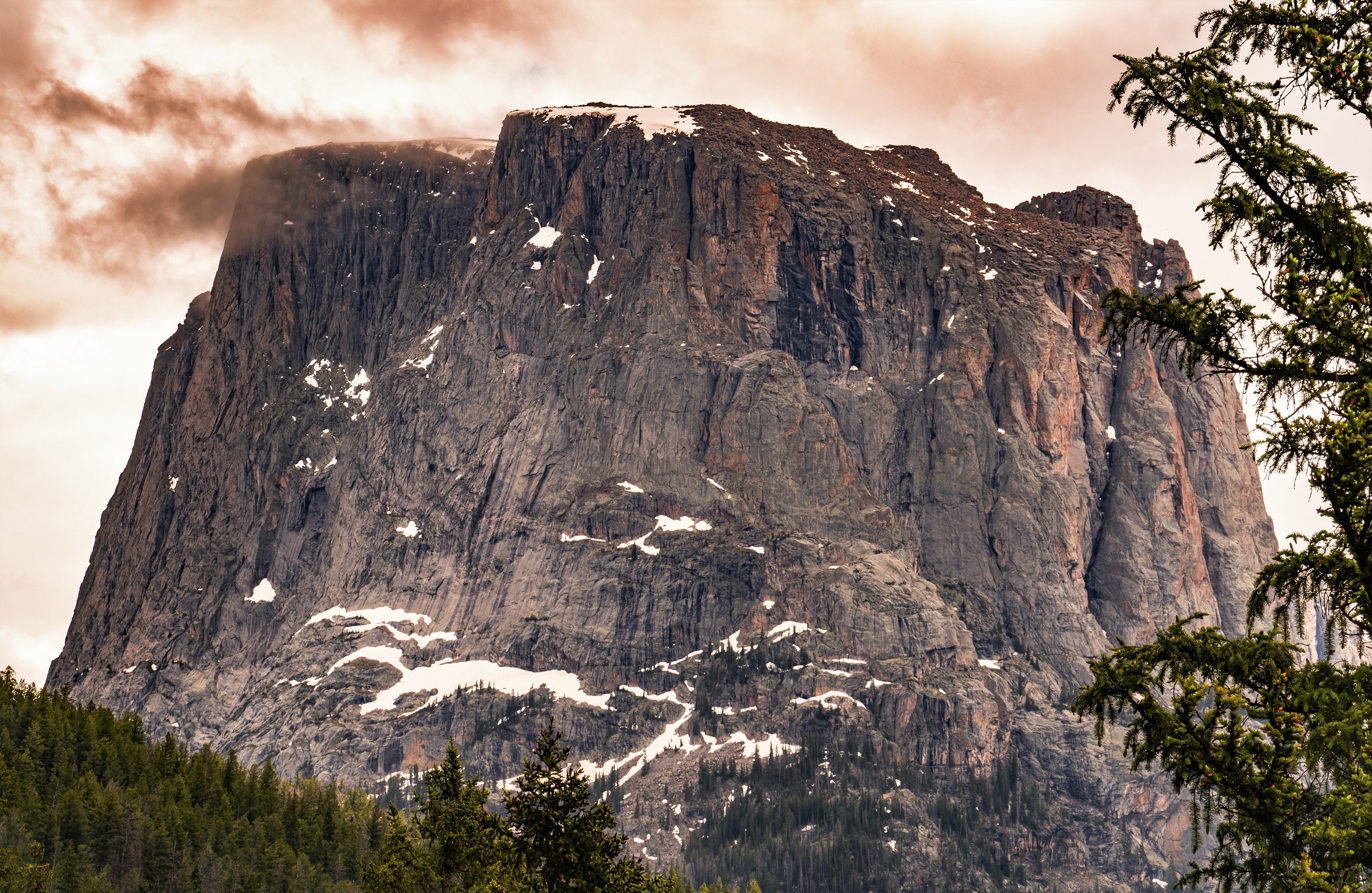
- Squaretop Mountain, northwest aspect

Highest point
- Elevation: 11,695 ft (3,565 m)
- Prominence: 655 ft (200 m)
- Parent peak: Peak 11830
- Isolation: 2.17 mi (3.49 km)
- Coordinates: 43°13′25″N 109°47′27″W

Geography
- Location within Wyoming Location within the United States
- Location: Sublette County, Wyoming, U.S.
- Parent range: Wind River Range
- Topo map: USGS Squaretop Mountain

Geology
- Rock type: Migmatite

Climbing
- First ascent: < 1921 by William Stroud
- Easiest route: class 2 hiking SE ledges

Squaretop Mountain is an 11,695-foot-elevation (3,565-meter) mountain summit located in Sublette County of Wyoming, United States.

== Geography ==
The peak is the emblematic geographical feature of the remote Wind River Range and is set seven miles west of the Continental Divide. It is situated in the Bridger Wilderness on land managed by Bridger-Teton National Forest. Topographic relief is significant as the northeast aspect rises 3,700 feet (1,100 meters) above the Green River in one-half mile. The iconic view of Squaretop and Green River Lakes has been on the Wyoming license plate since 2016.

== Climate ==
According to the Köppen climate classification system, Squaretop Mountain is located in an alpine subarctic climate zone with long, cold, snowy winters, and cool to warm summers. Due to its altitude, it receives precipitation all year, as snow in winter, and as thunderstorms in summer. Precipitation runoff from the mountain drains north into the Green River.

== Climbing ==
The first ascent of Squaretop was made sometime before 1921 by William John Stroud (1854–1946), via the class 2 southeast ledges. Fred Beckey and Layton Kor climbed the Northeast Face in 1960.

Other established climbing routes on Squaretop's walls:

- West Gully – 1937 – class 3 – H. H. Bliss
- East Face Center – 1958 – (IV 5th) – Bill Byrd, Dave Dingman, Roland Wyatt
- North Buttress – 1960 – (III 5.7) – Ed Cooper, Ron Niccoli
- East Face Right – 1965 – (V 5.8) – Fred Beckey, Jerry Fuller
- Southeast Face – 1971 – (II 5.6) – Vince Lee, E. Park, M. Stephens, C. Zukowski
- West Couloir – 1972 – (II 5.5) – Vince Lee, Bo Beckham, Greg Smith
- West Face Dihedral – 1974 – (V 5.10) – Greg Lowe, Jeff Lowe, Kent Christensen
- East Face Left – 1984 – (V 5.10d) – Jeff Lowe, Renato Casarotto
- West Face Right – 1992 – (IV 5.9 A2) – Scott Cole, John Malken
- AC/DC – 1998 – (IV 5.10) – Andy Carson, Dan Carson
- Miscreant Line and Conveyor Belt (East Face) – 2001 – (V 5.10d) – Tod Anderson, Skyler Crane, James Donnell, Ernest Moskovics
- Marginally Orange – 2009 – (IV 5.10) Norm Goltra, Steve Walker

== Hazards ==
Encountering bears is a concern in the Wind River Range. There are other concerns as well, including bugs, wildfires, adverse snow conditions and nighttime cold temperatures.

Importantly, there have been notable incidents, including accidental deaths, due to falls from steep cliffs (a misstep could be fatal in this class 4/5 terrain) and due to falling rocks, over the years, including 1993, 2007 (involving an experienced NOLS leader), 2015 and 2018. Other incidents include a seriously injured backpacker being airlifted near SquareTop Mountain in 2005, and a fatal hiker incident (from an apparent accidental fall) in 2006 that involved state search and rescue. The U.S. Forest Service does not offer updated aggregated records on the official number of fatalities in the Wind River Range.

== Gallery ==
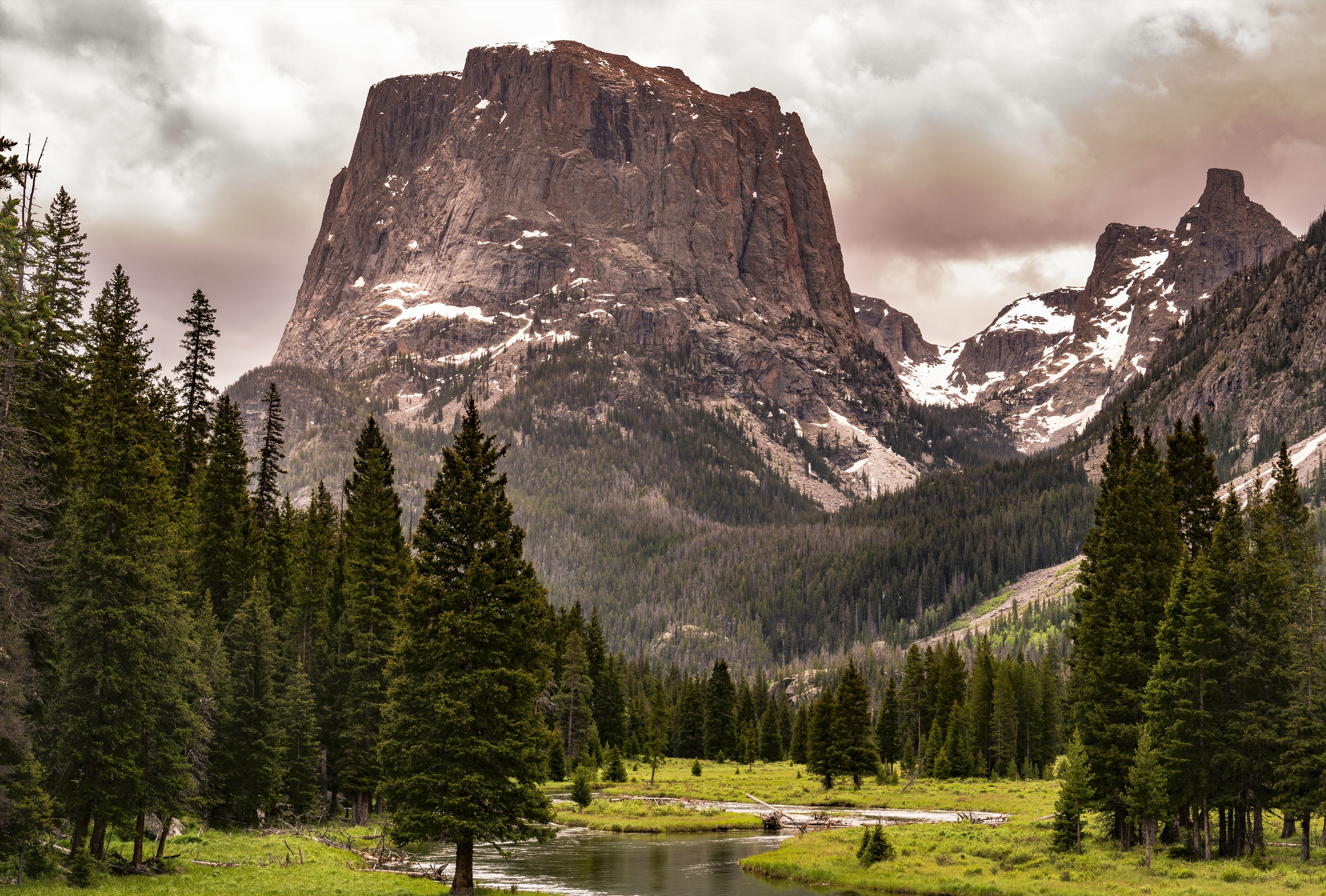

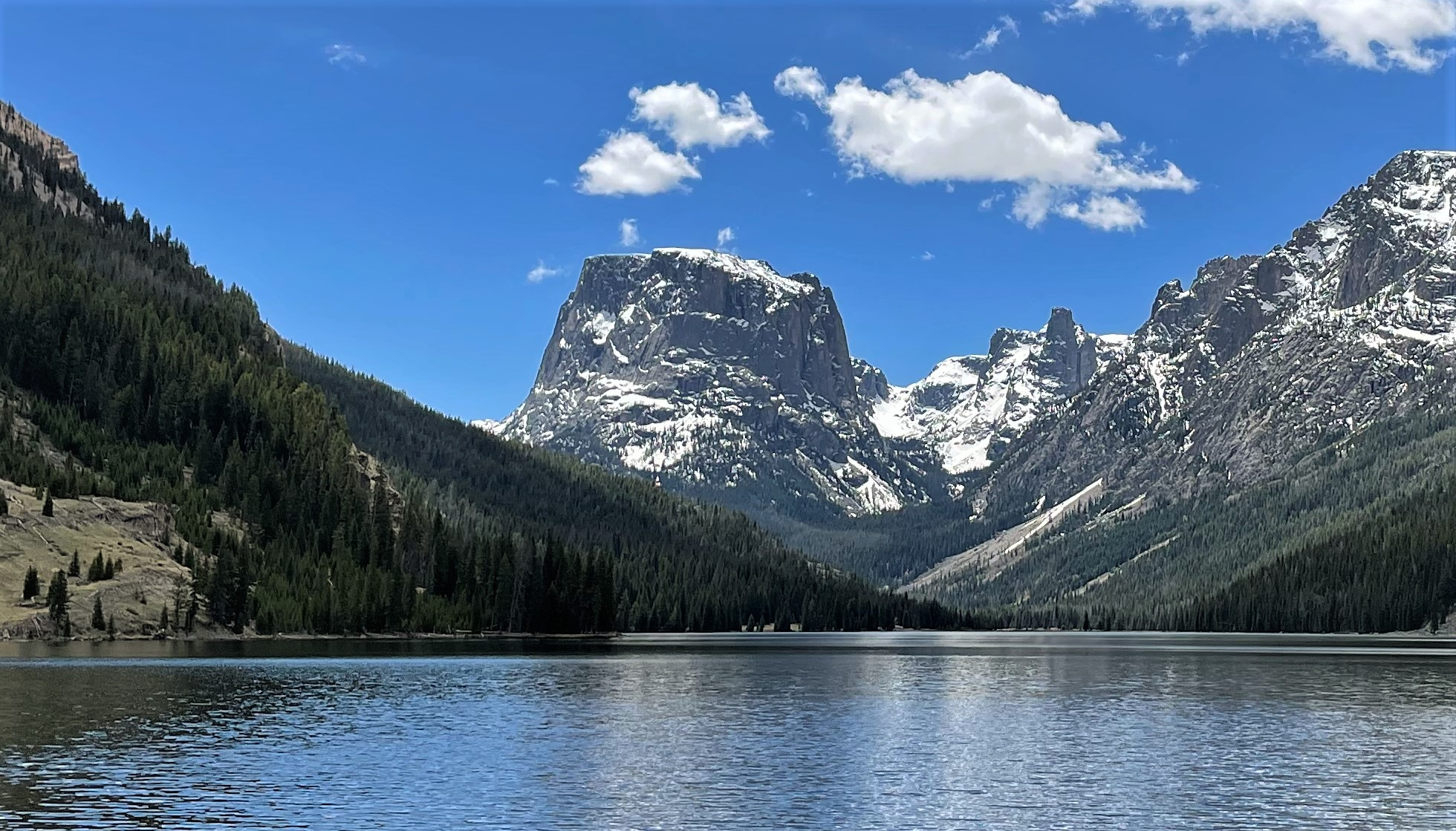
from Green River Lakes

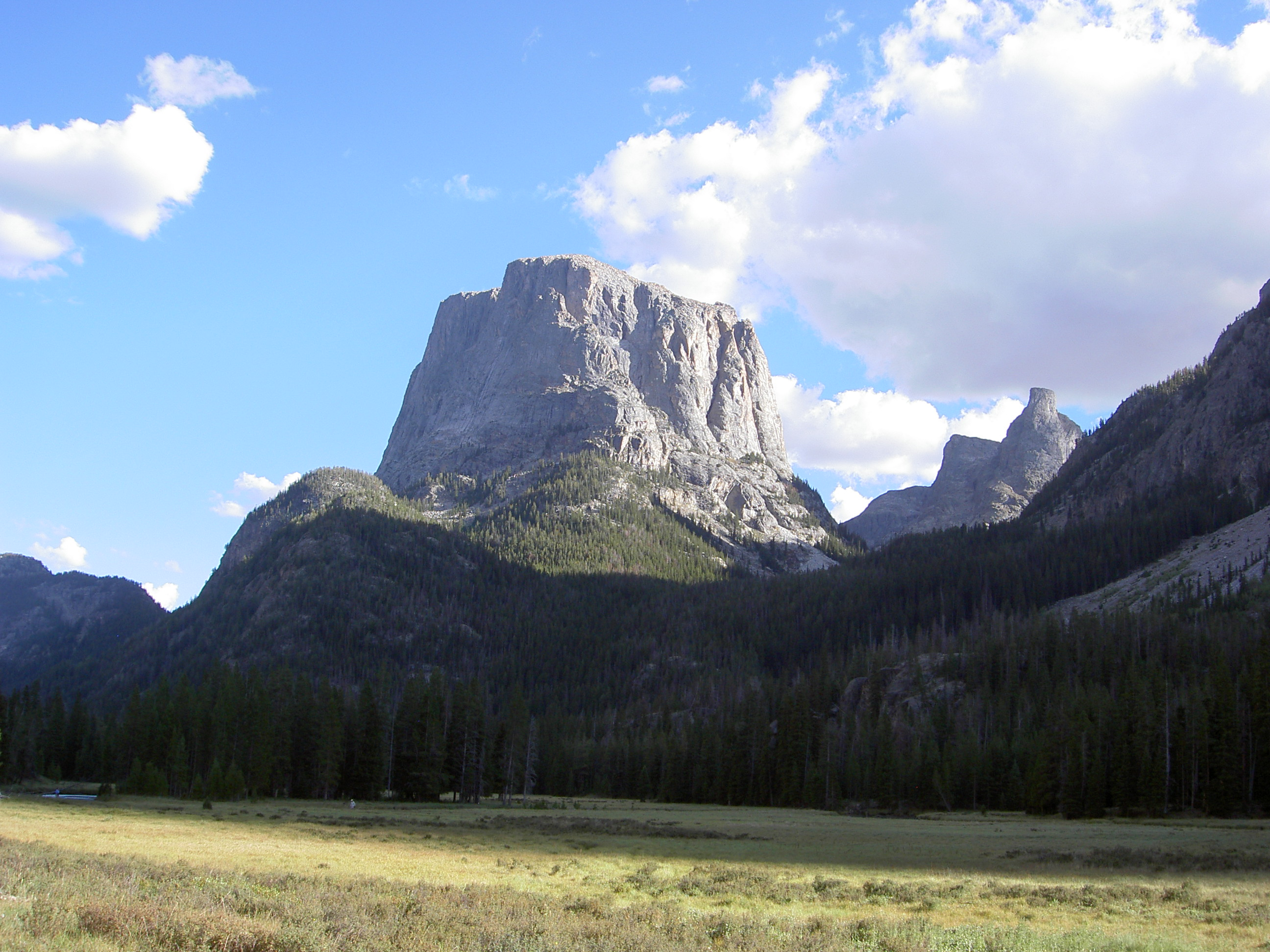

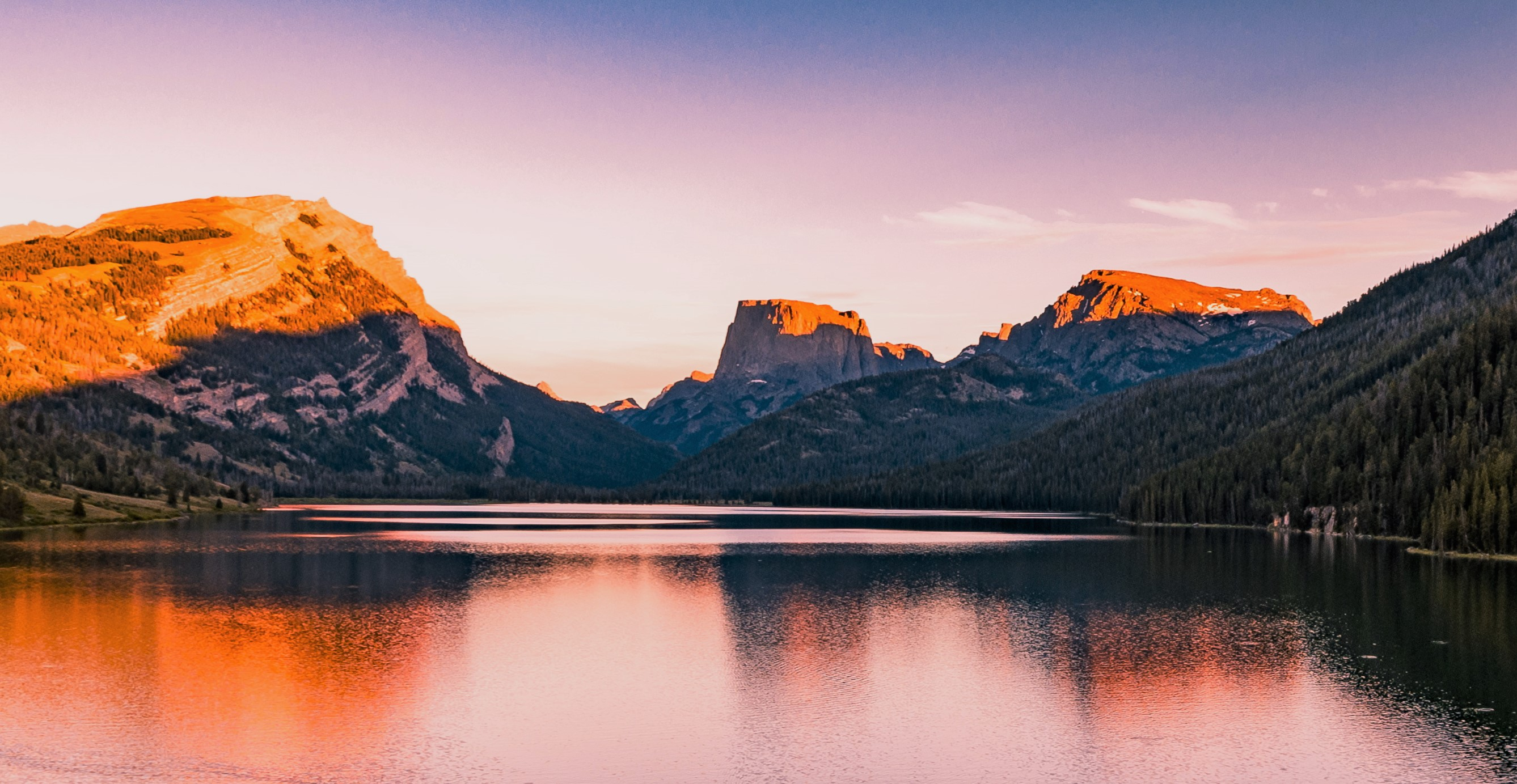
from Green River Lakes with White Rock on left, "Tabletop" on right

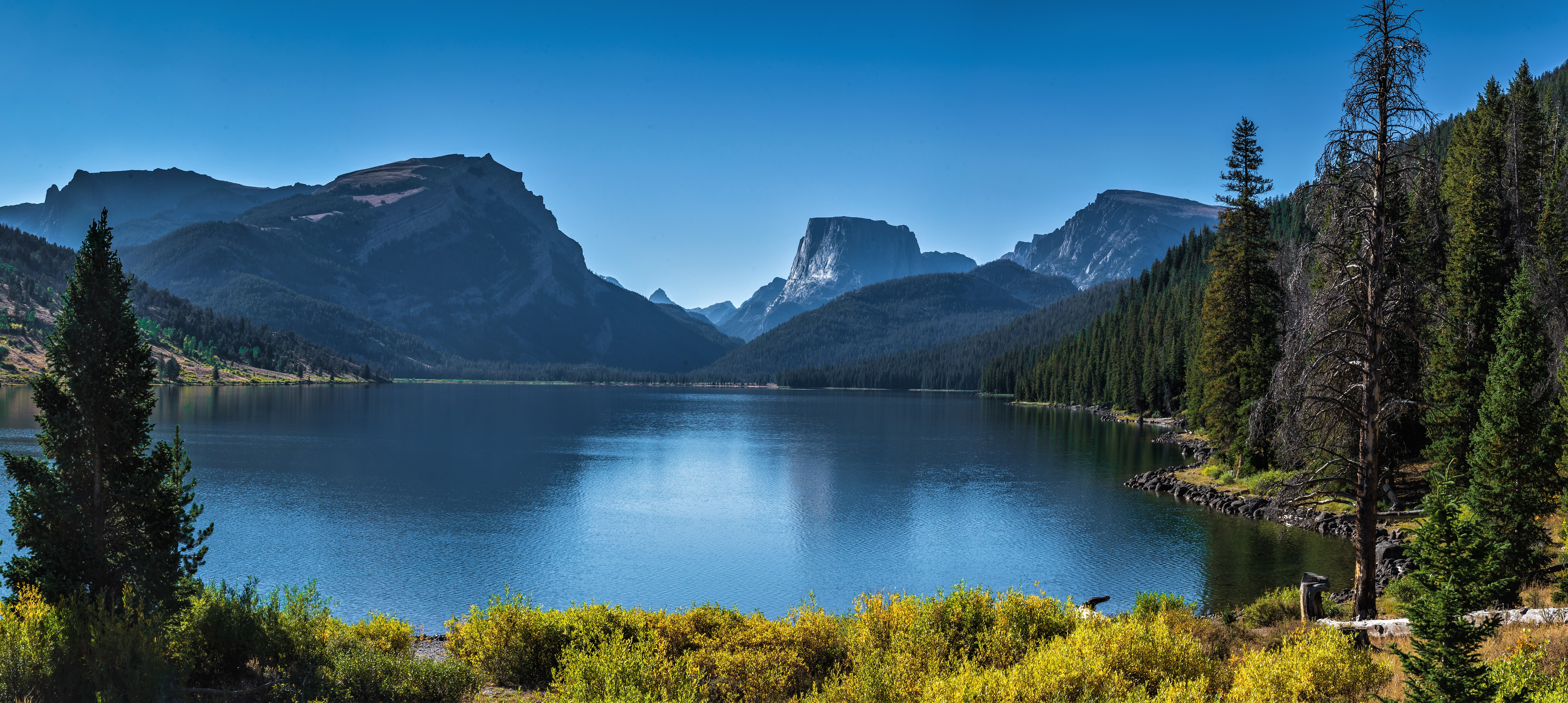
from Green River Lakes

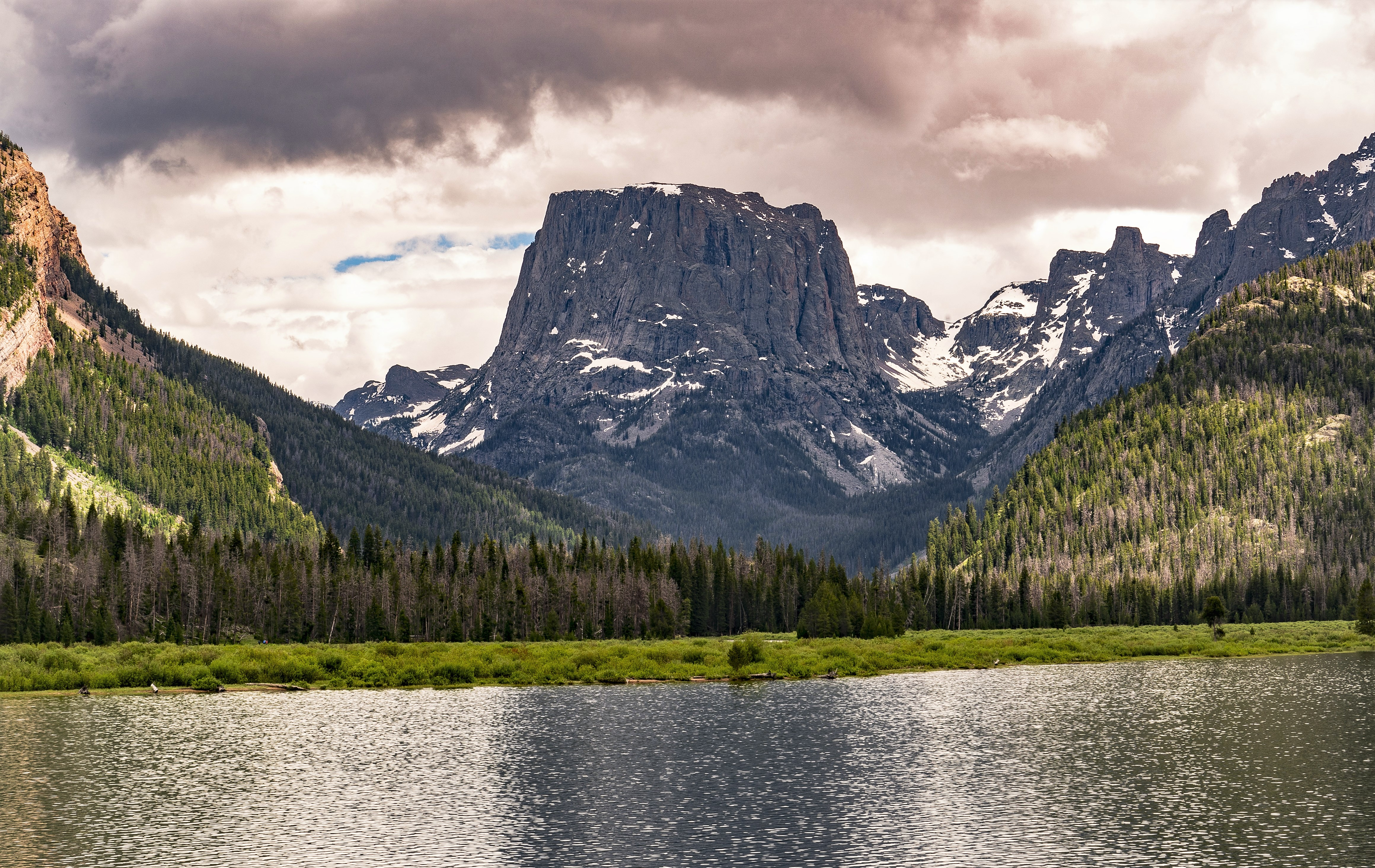
from Green River Lakes

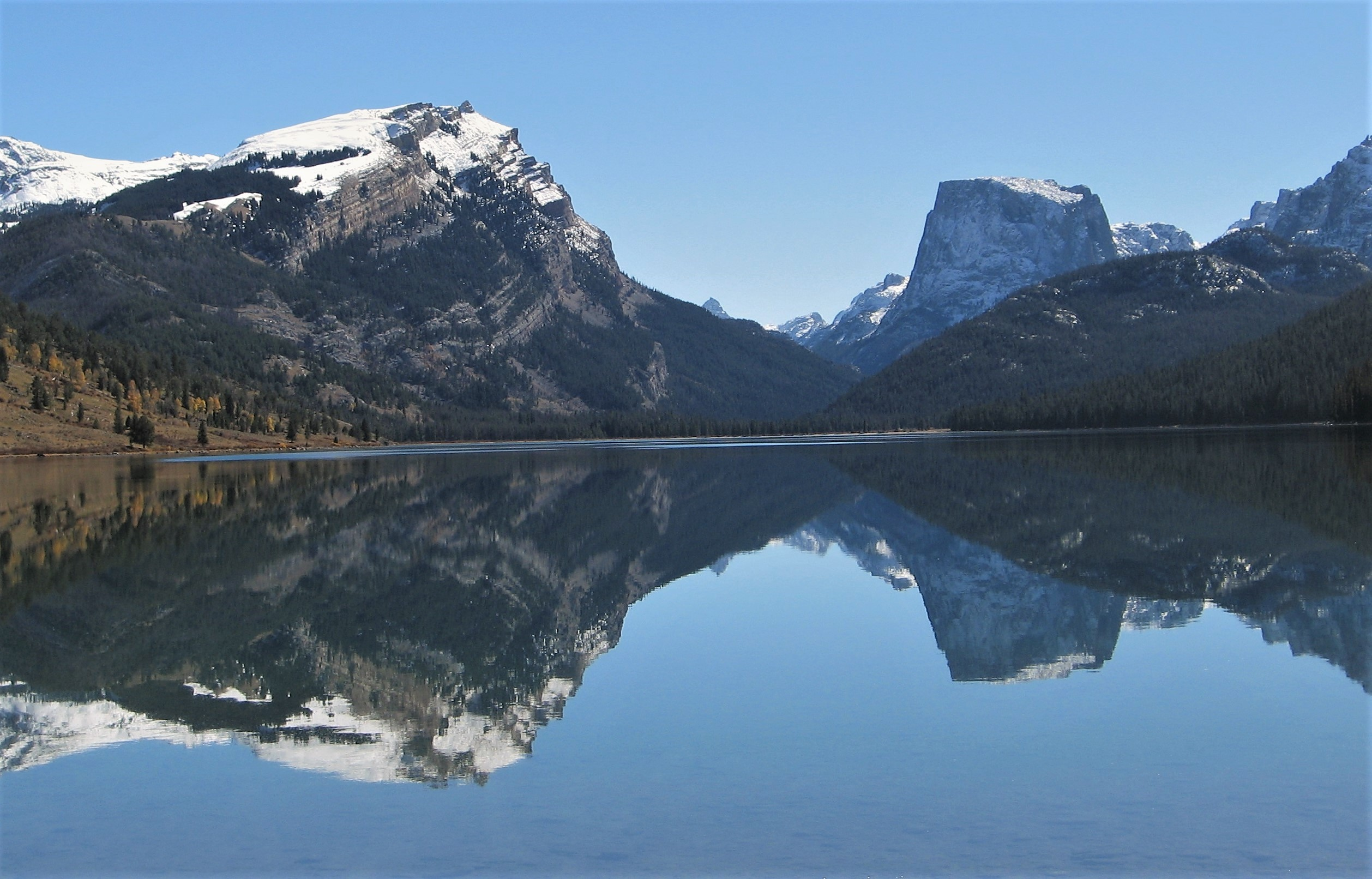
White Rock (left), Squaretop Mountain (right) reflected in Green River Lakes.
White Rock is a dolomite and limestone cliff that rises 3,300 feet above the lake.

== See also ==
- List of mountain peaks of Wyoming
