= Mammoth Glacier =

Glacier in the state of Wyoming

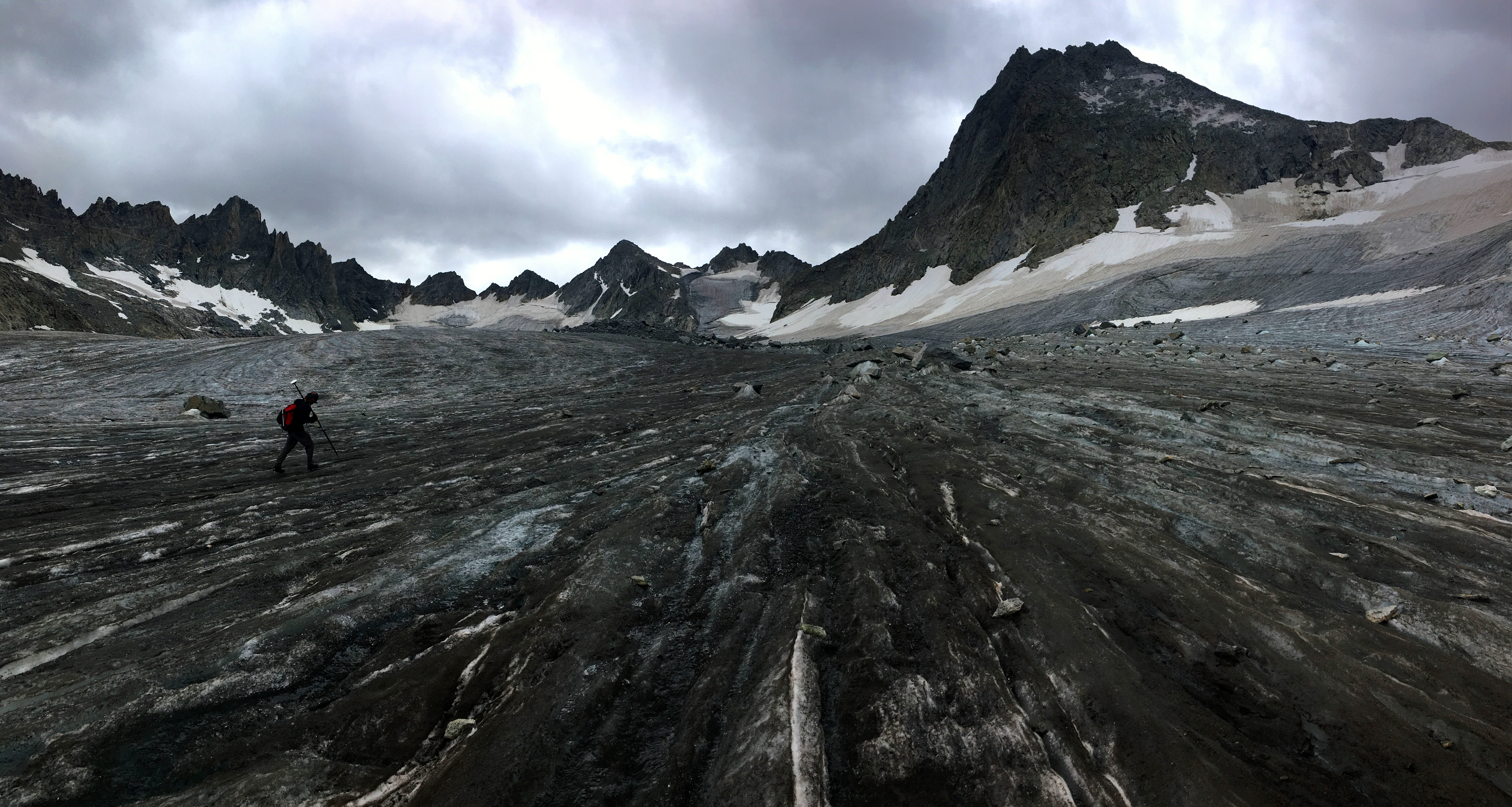
- Mammoth Glacier

- Location within Wyoming
- Type: Mountain glacier
- Location: Sublette County, Wyoming, USA
- Coordinates: 43°10′05″N 109°39′59″W
- Length: 1.4 mi (2.3 km)
- Terminus: Talus
- Status: Unknown

Mammoth Glacier is in the Bridger Wilderness of Bridger-Teton National Forest, in the U.S. state of Wyoming. The glacier is on the west side of the Continental Divide which separates it from Dinwoody Glacier to the east. Mammoth Glacier is the largest glacier on the west side of the Continental Divide of the Wind River Range and occupies a large, north facing cirque on the north slopes of Twin Peaks and just west of Mount Woodrow Wilson. Mammoth Glacier is part of the largest grouping of glaciers in the American Rocky Mountains.

== See also ==
- List of glaciers in the United States
