= Darwin Peak =

Mountain in Wyoming, United States

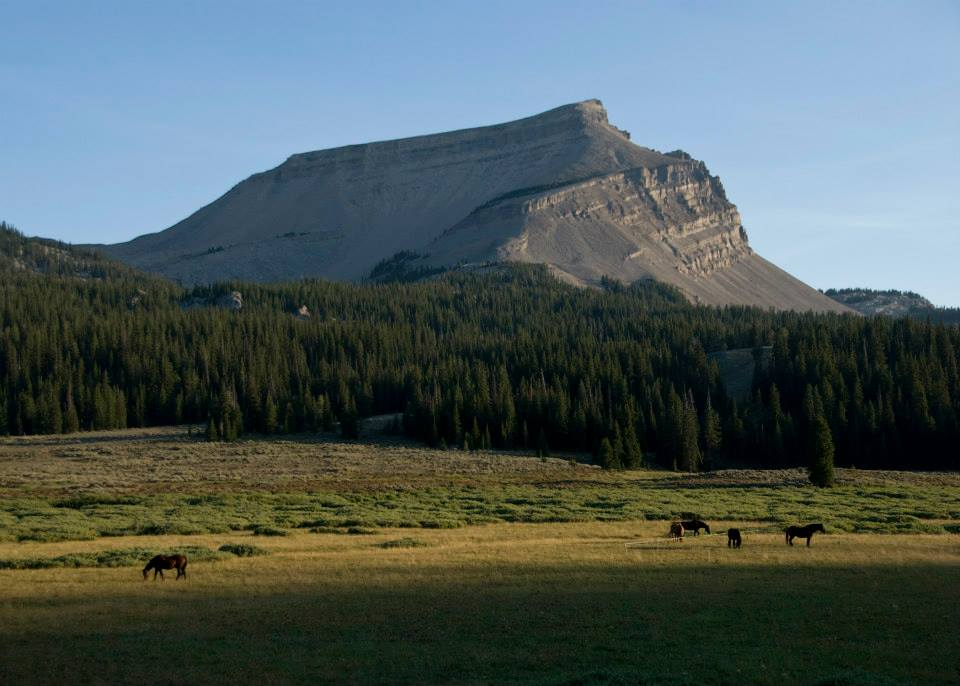
- North aspect

Highest point
- Elevation: 11,647 ft (3,550 m)
- Prominence: 867 ft (264 m)
- Parent peak: Doubletop Peak (11,740 ft)
- Isolation: 3.07 mi (4.94 km)
- Coordinates: 43°23′20″N 110°18′31″W

Naming
- Etymology: Fred Dickerson Dorwin

Geography
- Location within Wyoming Location within the United States
- Country: United States
- State: Wyoming
- County: Teton
- Protected area: Gros Ventre Wilderness
- Parent range: Rocky Mountains; Gros Ventre Range
- Topo map: USGS Darwin Peak

Geology
- Rock type: Sandstone

Climbing
- Easiest route: class 2 hiking

Darwin Peak is an 11,647-foot-elevation (3,550-meter) mountain summit in Teton County, Wyoming, United States.

== Description ==
Darwin Peak is located in the Gros Ventre Range, which is a subrange of the Rocky Mountains. Darwin Peak ranks as the third-highest peak in the range and is 3.09 miles (4.97 km) north-northwest of Doubletop Peak, the highest peak in the range. It is set 22 miles (35 km) west of the Continental Divide within the Gros Ventre Wilderness, on land managed by Bridger-Teton National Forest. The nearest town is Jackson, 24 miles (39 km) to the west-northwest. Precipitation runoff from the mountain drains into headwaters of the Gros Ventre River and topographic relief is significant as the summit rises over 2,600 feet (790 meters) above the river in 1.7 mile (2.7 km).

== History ==
The mountain's toponym has been officially adopted by the United States Board on Geographic Names, and has been recorded in publications since at least 1914 as the summit was used as a triangulation station. A USGS benchmark was placed at the summit in 1905. The name refers to Fred Dickerson Dorwin (1856–1929), an early homesteader who owned a ranch six miles east of the peak in the early 1900s.

== Climate ==
According to the Köppen climate classification system, Darwin Peak is located in an alpine subarctic climate zone with long, cold, snowy winters, and cool to warm summers. Due to its altitude, it receives precipitation all year, as snow in winter and as thunderstorms in summer.

Climate data for Darwin Peak 43.3952 N, 110.3074 W, Elevation: 11,312 ft (3,448 m) (1991–2020 normals)
Month	Jan	Feb	Mar	Apr	May	Jun	Jul	Aug	Sep	Oct	Nov	Dec	Year
Mean daily maximum °F (°C)	21.3 (−5.9)	21.0 (−6.1)	26.6 (−3.0)	31.8 (−0.1)	41.4 (5.2)	52.5 (11.4)	62.7 (17.1)	61.8 (16.6)	52.4 (11.3)	39.2 (4.0)	26.9 (−2.8)	20.6 (−6.3)	38.2 (3.5)
Daily mean °F (°C)	12.4 (−10.9)	11.2 (−11.6)	16.0 (−8.9)	20.7 (−6.3)	29.8 (−1.2)	39.8 (4.3)	49.0 (9.4)	48.1 (8.9)	39.6 (4.2)	28.1 (−2.2)	18.0 (−7.8)	11.9 (−11.2)	27.1 (−2.8)
Mean daily minimum °F (°C)	3.4 (−15.9)	1.4 (−17.0)	5.4 (−14.8)	9.6 (−12.4)	18.2 (−7.7)	27.2 (−2.7)	35.2 (1.8)	34.5 (1.4)	26.9 (−2.8)	17.0 (−8.3)	9.1 (−12.7)	3.1 (−16.1)	15.9 (−8.9)
Average precipitation inches (mm)	3.64 (92)	3.15 (80)	2.84 (72)	2.64 (67)	3.43 (87)	2.27 (58)	1.51 (38)	1.54 (39)	2.12 (54)	2.31 (59)	3.13 (80)	3.81 (97)	32.39 (823)
Source: PRISM Climate Group

== See also ==
- List of mountain peaks of Wyoming
