= Gros Ventre (disambiguation) =

The Gros Ventre are a Native American people of Montana.

Gros Ventre may also refer to:

- Gros Ventre language, the extinct language of the Gros Ventre people
- Gros Ventre of the Missouri, an archaic term for the Hidatsa people

== Places ==
- Gros Ventre Range
- Gros Ventre River
- Gros Ventre landslide
- Gros Ventre Wilderness
