= Hodges Peak =

Mountain in Wyoming, United States

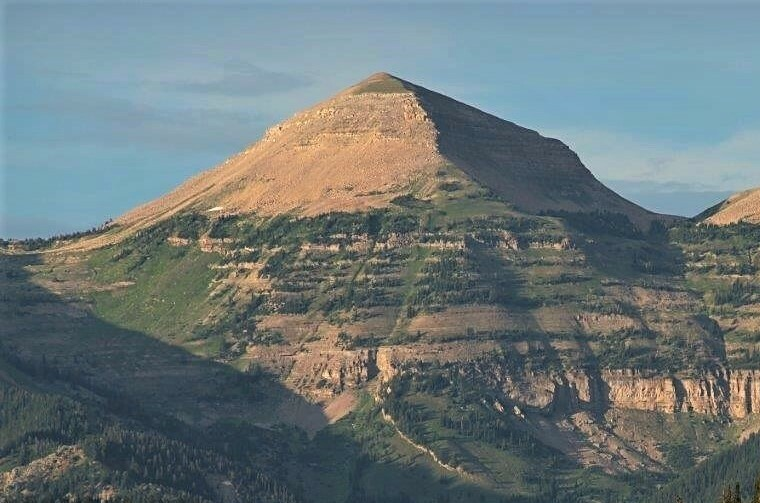
- Southwest aspect of Hodges Peak

Highest point
- Elevation: 11,180 ft (3,408 m)
- Prominence: 760 ft (232 m)
- Parent peak: Doubletop Peak (11,740 ft)
- Isolation: 2.29 mi (3.69 km)
- Coordinates: 43°19′06″N 110°15′54″W

Geography
- Location within Wyoming Location within the United States
- Country: United States
- State: Wyoming
- County: Sublette
- Protected area: Gros Ventre Wilderness
- Parent range: Rocky Mountains; Gros Ventre Range
- Topo map: USGS Doubletop Peak

Geology
- Rock age: Carboniferous
- Rock type(s): Sandstone, Amsden Formation

Climbing
- Easiest route: class 2 hiking

Hodges Peak is an 11,180-foot-elevation (3,408-meter) mountain summit in Sublette County, Wyoming, United States.

== Description ==
Hodges Peak is located on the crest of the Gros Ventre Range which is a subrange of the Rocky Mountains. Hodges Peak ranks as the ninth-highest peak in the range and is 2.27 miles (3.65 km) south-southeast of Doubletop Peak, the highest peak in the range. It is set 28 miles (45 km) west of the Continental Divide within the Gros Ventre Wilderness, on land managed by Bridger-Teton National Forest. The nearest town is Jackson, 27 miles (43 km) to the west-northwest. Precipitation runoff from the mountain's west slope drains to the Hoback River via Dell Creek, whereas the east slope drains to the Green River via Tosi Creek. Topographic relief is significant as the summit rises approximately 2,800 feet (850 meters) above Dell Creek in one mile (1.6 km). The mountain's toponym has been officially adopted by the United States Board on Geographic Names, and has been recorded in publications since at least 1914.

== Climate ==
According to the Köppen climate classification system, Hodges Peak is located in an alpine subarctic climate zone with long, cold, snowy winters, and cool to warm summers. Due to its altitude, it receives precipitation all year, as snow in winter and as thunderstorms in summer.

== See also ==
- List of mountain peaks of Wyoming
