= Virginia Peak (Wyoming) =

Mountain in Wyoming, United States

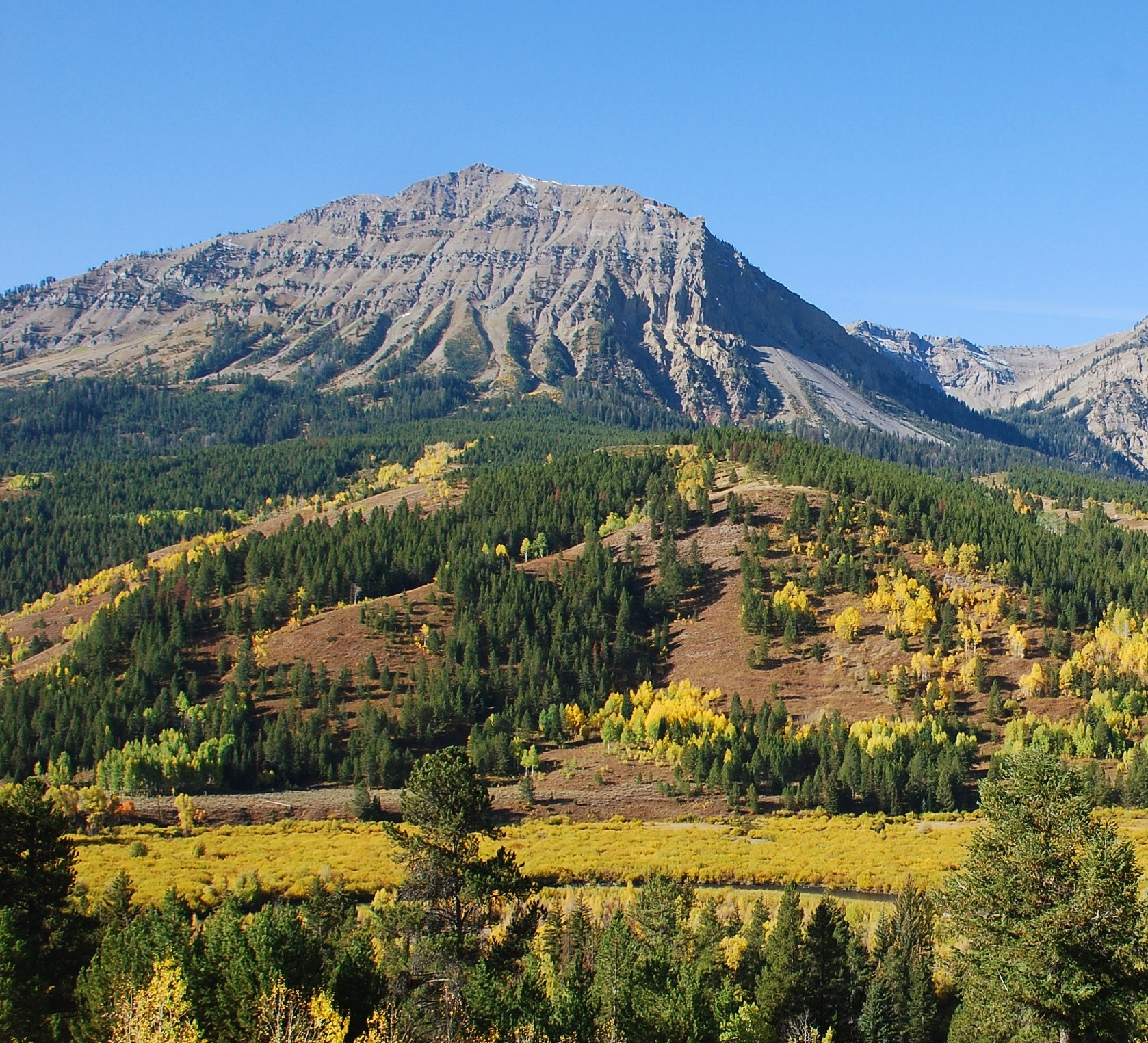
- Northeast aspect

Highest point
- Elevation: 10,141 ft (3,091 m)
- Prominence: 641 ft (195 m)
- Parent peak: Man Peak (10,326 ft)
- Isolation: 2.88 mi (4.63 km)
- Coordinates: 42°56′05″N 110°47′12″W

Geography
- Location within Wyoming Location within the United States
- Country: United States
- State: Wyoming
- County: Lincoln
- Protected area: Bridger–Teton National Forest
- Parent range: Rocky Mountains; Salt River Range
- Topo map: USGS Man Peak

Climbing
- Easiest route: class 1 hiking

Virginia Peak is a 10,141-foot-elevation (3,091-meter) mountain summit in Lincoln County, Wyoming, United States.

== Description ==
Virginia Peak is set in the Salt River Range which is a subrange of the Rocky Mountains. It is located 19 miles (31 km) south-southeast of Alpine, Wyoming, on land managed by Bridger–Teton National Forest. Precipitation runoff from the mountain drains into the Greys River and topographic relief is significant as the summit rises 3,700 feet (1,100 meters) above the river in two miles (3.2 km). The mountain's toponym has been officially adopted by the United States Board on Geographic Names.

== Climate ==
According to the Köppen climate classification system, Virginia Peak is located in an alpine subarctic climate zone with long, cold, snowy winters, and cool to warm summers. Due to its altitude, it receives precipitation all year, as snow in winter and as thunderstorms in summer.

== See also ==
- List of mountain peaks of Wyoming
- Mountains of Lincoln County, Wyoming
