= Gros Ventre Range =

Mountain range in Wyoming, United States

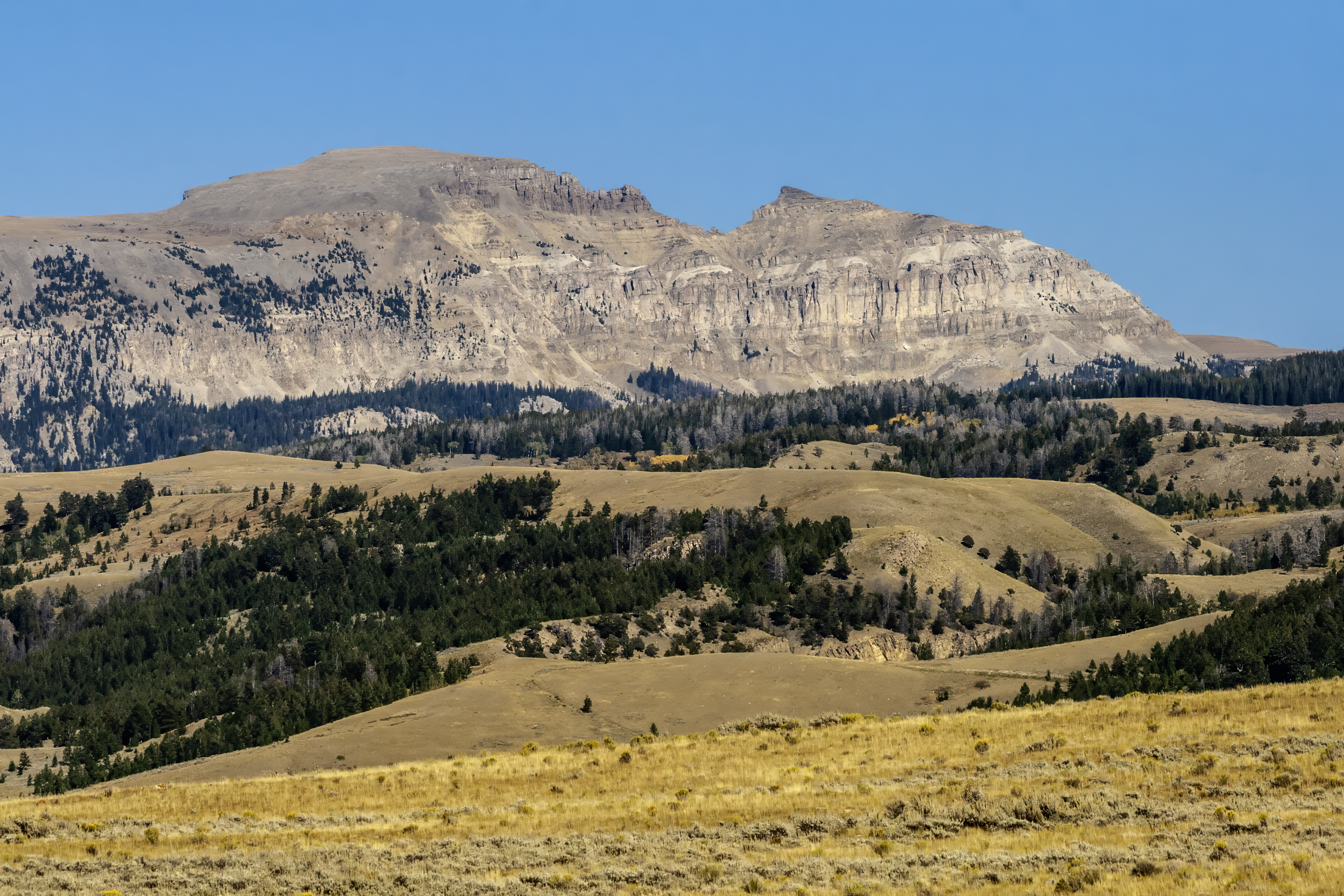
- The "Sleeping Indian" on Sheep Mountain

Highest point
- Peak: Doubletop Peak
- Elevation: 11,720 ft (3,570 m)
- Coordinates: 43°20′55″N 110°17′13″W

Geography
- Country: United States
- State: Wyoming
- Parent range: Rocky Mountains

The Gros Ventre Range (/ˌɡroʊ ˈvɑːnt/ groh-VAHNT) is part of the Central Rocky Mountains and is located west of the Continental Divide in U.S. state of Wyoming. The name "Gros Ventre" is French for "big belly." The highest summit in the range is Doubletop Peak at 11,720 feet (3,570 m). The Gros Ventre Range is mostly within the Gros Ventre Wilderness of Bridger–Teton National Forest. To the northwest of the range lies the valley known as Jackson Hole. Snow King ski resort is in the range adjacent to the town of Jackson, Wyoming. Also in the Gros Ventre Range is the Gros Ventre landslide, which in 1925 slid down the north slope of Sheep Mountain.

== Tallest peaks in the range ==
1. Doubletop Peak 11,720 feet (3,570 m)
2. Black Peak 11,657 feet (3,553 m)
3. Darwin Peak 11,647 feet (3,550 m)
4. Antoinette Peak 11,407 feet (3,477 m)
5. Tosi Peak 11,380 feet (3,470 m)
6. Sheep Mountain 11,239 feet (3,426 m)
7. Gros Peak 11,180 feet (3,410 m)
8. Hodges Peak 11,180 feet (3,410 m)
9. Pinnacle Peak 10,808 feet (3,294 m)
10. Jackson Peak 10,741 feet (3,274 m)
11. Mount Leidy 10,326 feet (3,147 m)

== Climate ==
Climate data for Gros Ventre Summit, Wyoming, 1991–2020 normals, 1985-2020 extremes: 8750ft (2667m)
Month	Jan	Feb	Mar	Apr	May	Jun	Jul	Aug	Sep	Oct	Nov	Dec	Year
Record high °F (°C)	47 (8)	62 (17)	67 (19)	71 (22)	77 (25)	92 (33)	91 (33)	88 (31)	85 (29)	71 (22)	63 (17)	42 (6)	92 (33)
Mean maximum °F (°C)	38.5 (3.6)	45.4 (7.4)	54.7 (12.6)	61.6 (16.4)	69.0 (20.6)	77.2 (25.1)	81.2 (27.3)	80.5 (26.9)	74.8 (23.8)	64.0 (17.8)	48.6 (9.2)	37.4 (3.0)	82.1 (27.8)
Mean daily maximum °F (°C)	26.6 (−3.0)	31.9 (−0.1)	41.3 (5.2)	47.2 (8.4)	55.3 (12.9)	63.8 (17.7)	72.6 (22.6)	71.2 (21.8)	61.3 (16.3)	47.6 (8.7)	33.6 (0.9)	24.4 (−4.2)	48.1 (8.9)
Daily mean °F (°C)	13.1 (−10.5)	15.9 (−8.9)	24.3 (−4.3)	31.6 (−0.2)	40.6 (4.8)	47.6 (8.7)	54.2 (12.3)	52.7 (11.5)	45.0 (7.2)	33.9 (1.1)	20.5 (−6.4)	12.0 (−11.1)	32.6 (0.4)
Mean daily minimum °F (°C)	−0.4 (−18.0)	−0.2 (−17.9)	7.2 (−13.8)	16.0 (−8.9)	25.7 (−3.5)	31.4 (−0.3)	35.7 (2.1)	34.3 (1.3)	28.6 (−1.9)	20.2 (−6.6)	7.4 (−13.7)	−0.4 (−18.0)	17.1 (−8.3)
Mean minimum °F (°C)	−20.8 (−29.3)	−20.2 (−29.0)	−14.5 (−25.8)	−3.5 (−19.7)	11.3 (−11.5)	23.2 (−4.9)	28.3 (−2.1)	26.4 (−3.1)	17.9 (−7.8)	1.7 (−16.8)	−15.1 (−26.2)	−22.0 (−30.0)	−26.1 (−32.3)
Record low °F (°C)	−35 (−37)	−30 (−34)	−25 (−32)	−16 (−27)	−1 (−18)	19 (−7)	20 (−7)	15 (−9)	5 (−15)	−18 (−28)	−32 (−36)	−37 (−38)	−37 (−38)
Average precipitation inches (mm)	1.94 (49)	2.00 (51)	2.33 (59)	2.19 (56)	2.42 (61)	1.92 (49)	1.14 (29)	1.26 (32)	1.81 (46)	1.97 (50)	2.07 (53)	2.25 (57)	23.3 (592)
Source 1: XMACIS2
Source 2: NOAA (Precipitation)
