= Leidy =

Leidy can refer to:

- Leidy (name), a surname and given name
- Leidy Glacier, NW Greenland
- Leidy Township, Pennsylvania
- Mount Leidy, a mountain in Wyoming
