= Man Peak =

Mountain in Wyoming, United States

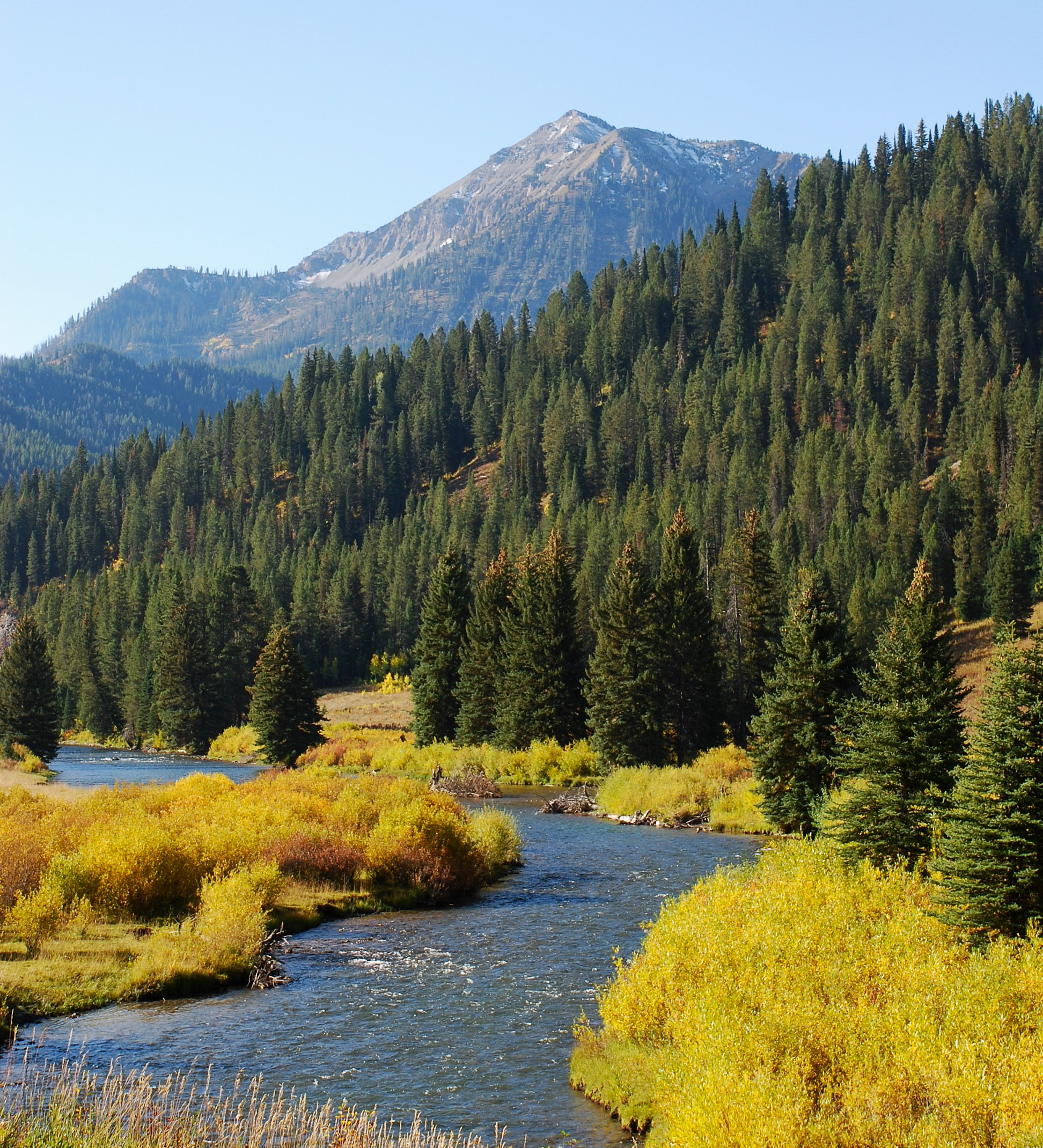
- North aspect, with Greys River

Highest point
- Elevation: 10,326 ft (3,147 m)
- Prominence: 1,026 ft (313 m)
- Parent peak: Deadman Mountain (10,361 ft)
- Isolation: 8.29 mi (13.34 km)
- Coordinates: 42°58′04″N 110°49′16″W

Geography
- Location within Wyoming Location within the United States
- Country: United States
- State: Wyoming
- County: Lincoln
- Protected area: Bridger–Teton National Forest
- Parent range: Rocky Mountains; Salt River Range
- Topo map: USGS Man Peak

Climbing
- Easiest route: class 1 hiking

Man Peak is a 10,326-foot-elevation (3,147-meter) mountain summit in Lincoln County, Wyoming, United States.

== Description ==
Man Peak is the ninth-highest peak in the Salt River Range which is a subrange of the Rocky Mountains. It is located 16.5 miles (26.6 km) south-southeast of Alpine, Wyoming, on land managed by Bridger–Teton National Forest. Precipitation runoff from the mountain drains into the Greys River and topographic relief is significant as the summit rises over 3,900 feet (1,200 meters) above the river in 2.5 miles (4 km). The mountain's toponym has been officially adopted by the United States Board on Geographic Names.

== Climate ==
According to the Köppen climate classification system, Man Peak is located in an alpine subarctic climate zone with long, cold, snowy winters, and cool to warm summers. Due to its altitude, it receives precipitation all year, as snow in winter and as thunderstorms in summer.

== See also ==
- List of mountain peaks of Wyoming
- Virginia Peak (Wyoming)
- Mountains of Lincoln County, Wyoming
