= Granite Hot Springs =

There are several places using the name Granite Hot Springs:

- Granite Hot Springs, Nevada in Washoe County, Nevada, now known as Lawton Hot Springs
- Granite Hot Springs, Montana in Missoula County, Montana
- Granite Hot Springs, Wyoming in Sublette County, Wyoming
