= Kelly, Wyoming =

Kelly
- Census-designated place
- Location within the state of Wyoming
- Coordinates: 43°37′26″N 110°37′34″W
- Country: United States
- State: Wyoming
- County: Teton

Area
  - Total: 0.48 sq mi (1.24 km^{2})
  - Land: 0.48 sq mi (1.24 km^{2})
  - Water: 0 sq mi (0.0 km^{2})
- Elevation: 6,653 ft (2,028 m)

Population (2010)
  - Total: 138
  - Density: 288/sq mi (111/km^{2})
- Time zone: UTC-7 (Mountain (MST))
  - Summer (DST): UTC-6 (MDT)
- ZIP codes: 83011
- FIPS code: 56-41860
- GNIS feature ID: 2629273

Kelly is a census-designated place (CDP) in Teton County in the U.S. state of Wyoming. The population was 138 at the 2010 census.

== Geography ==
Kelly is situated along the Gros Ventre River on the eastern side of the Jackson Hole valley, is part of the Jackson, WY–ID Micropolitan Statistical Area and has a US Post Office with zip code 83011.

According to the United States Census Bureau, the CDP has a total area of 0.48 square mile (1.24 km^{2}), all land.

=== Climate ===
Kelly has a humid continental climate (Dfb) bordering on a subarctic climate (Dfc) with warm summers and very cold winters.

Climate data for Kelly
Month	Jan	Feb	Mar	Apr	May	Jun	Jul	Aug	Sep	Oct	Nov	Dec	Year
Mean daily maximum °F (°C)	25 (−4)	30 (−1)	39 (4)	49 (9)	60 (16)	70 (21)	80 (27)	78 (26)	69 (21)	54 (12)	37 (3)	26 (−3)	51 (11)
Daily mean °F (°C)	12.5 (−10.8)	16 (−9)	25.5 (−3.6)	35 (2)	45 (7)	53 (12)	60.5 (15.8)	58.5 (14.7)	50 (10)	38 (3)	24.5 (−4.2)	13.5 (−10.3)	36.0 (2.2)
Mean daily minimum °F (°C)	0 (−18)	2 (−17)	12 (−11)	21 (−6)	30 (−1)	36 (2)	41 (5)	39 (4)	31 (−1)	22 (−6)	12 (−11)	1 (−17)	21 (−6)
Average rainfall inches (mm)	2.6 (66)	1.9 (48)	1.7 (43)	1.5 (38)	1.8 (46)	1.6 (41)	1.3 (33)	1.3 (33)	1.4 (36)	1.1 (28)	2.6 (66)	2.7 (69)	21.5 (547)
Average snowfall inches (cm)	40.1 (102)	27.1 (69)	18.1 (46)	9.1 (23)	2.3 (5.8)	0.1 (0.25)	0 (0)	0 (0)	0.2 (0.51)	4.5 (11)	20.9 (53)	38 (97)	160.4 (407.56)
Source: NOAA (normals, 1971−2000)

== History ==
The settlement, known today as Kelly, officially formed in the late 1890s as Grovont, but was renamed Kelly in 1909 to avoid confusion with a similarly named settlement nearby. On May 18, 1927, the town was destroyed when a natural dam formed by the Gros Ventre landslide two years earlier collapsed and completely flooded the town.

=== The Kelly Flood ===
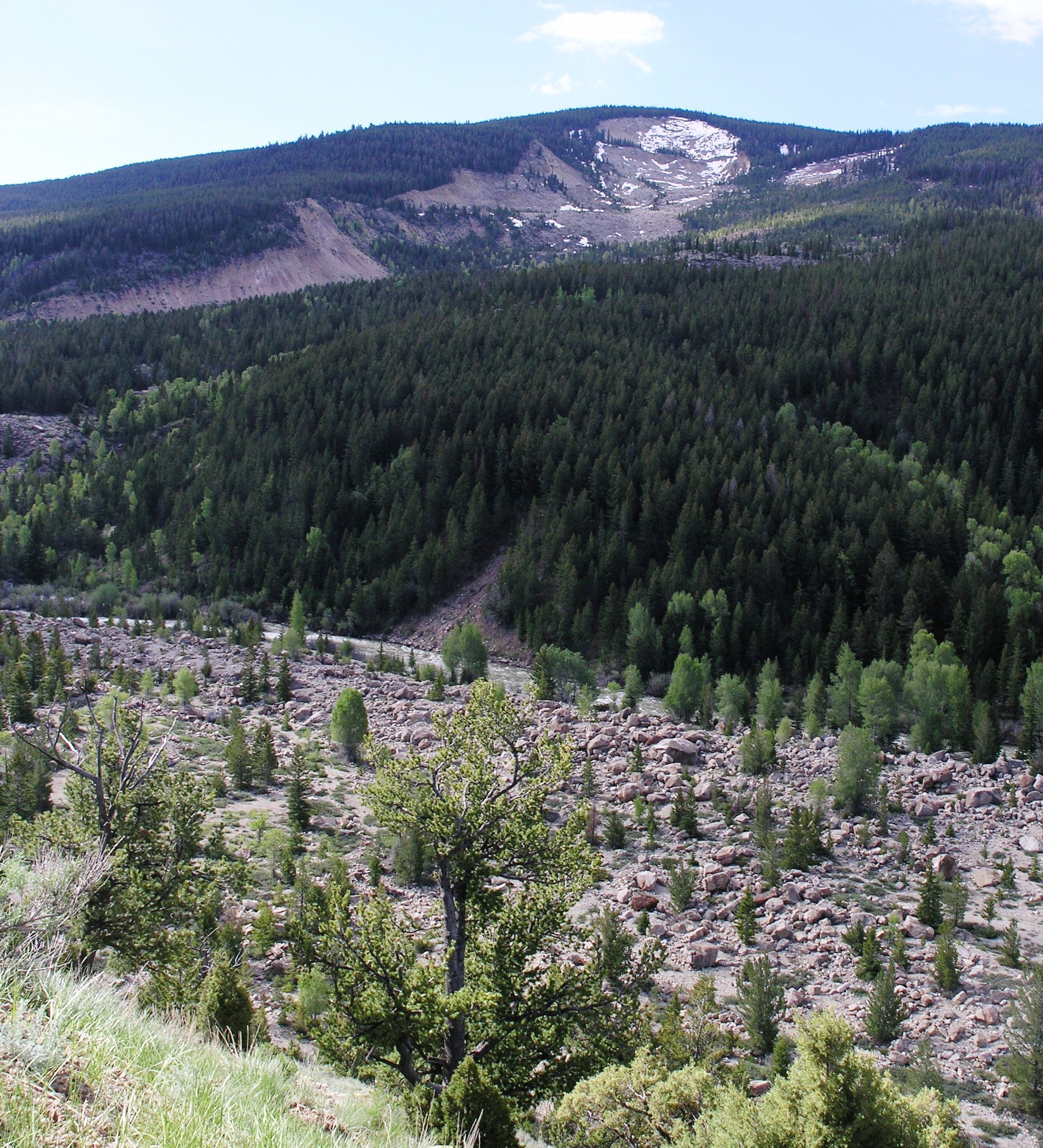
The Gros Ventre Slide

On June 23, 1925 following weeks of heavy rain, approximately 50,000,000 cubic yards (38,000,000 m^{3}) of rock slid off the north face of Sheep Mountain, and into a valley formed by the Gros Ventre River. The rock formed a large natural dam, backing up the water and forming Lower Slide Lake. The lake and dam eventually stabilized, and engineers determined there was no danger of collapse. There were heavy snows in the winter of 1926–1927, and the higher than normal snow melt was accompanied by more weeks of heavy rain in May 1927. On May 18, residents started to notice debris from the flooding of the upper valley floating downstream in the river. Alarmed, several residents went to the dam to discover that the lake had overflowed the top of the dam and was beginning to erode it. The warning was given, and the residents of the town evacuated. The ensuing flood was 6 feet (1.8 m) deep for at least 25 miles (40 km) downstream. The flood destroyed most of the town, leaving only the church and the schoolhouse standing. Thanks to the prior warning, only six people perished in the flood. The deluge also damaged ranches and part of the community of Wilson, 14 miles (23 km) downstream on the Snake River.

== Education ==
Public education in the community of Kelly is provided by Teton County School District #1. Schools serving the community include Kelly Elementary School (grades K-5), Jackson Hole Middle School (grades 6–8), and Jackson Hole High School (grades 9–12).
