= Sheep Mountain (Teton County, Wyoming) =

Mountain in Wyoming, United States

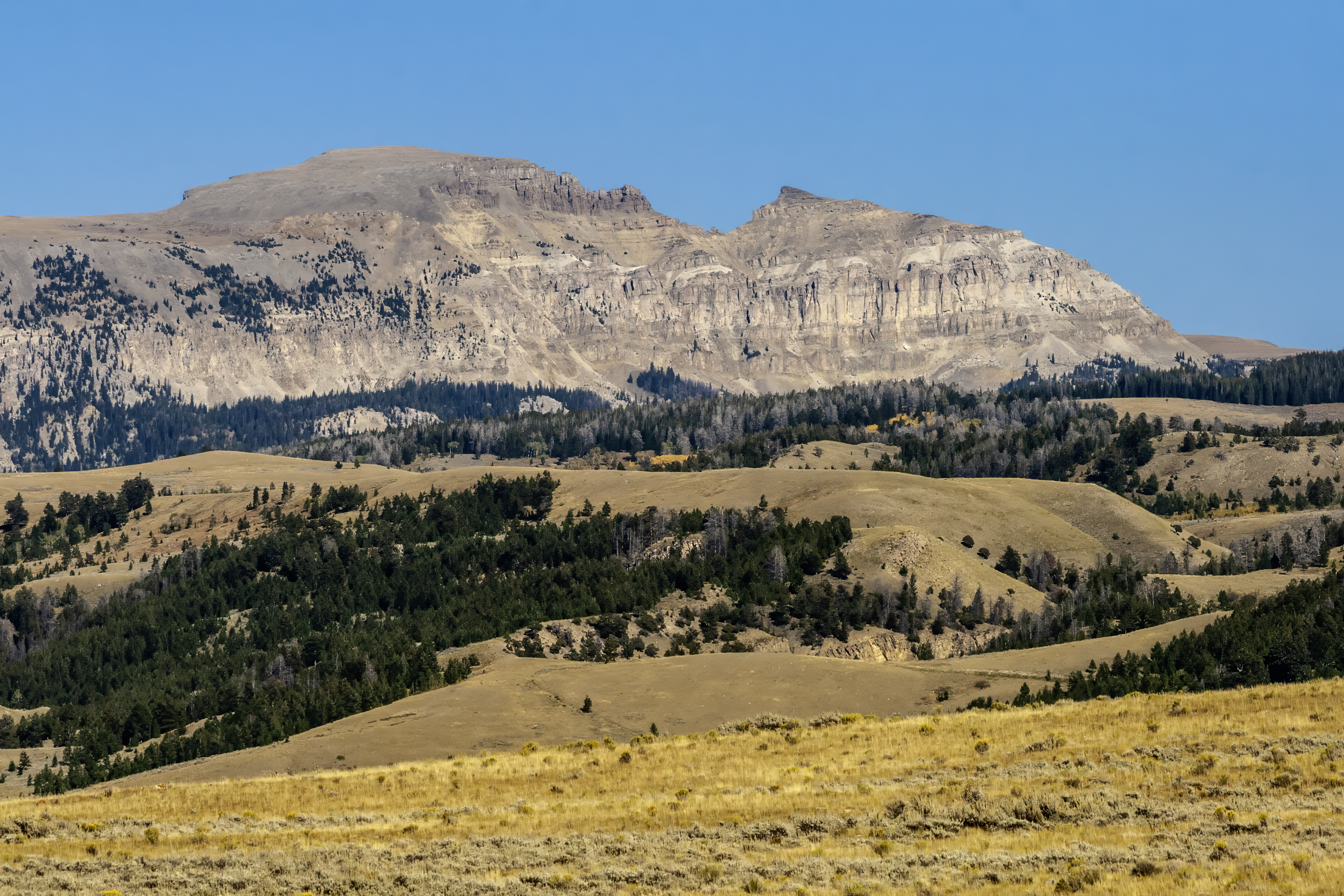
- The "Sleeping Indian" on Sheep Mountain as viewed from Jackson Hole

Highest point
- Elevation: 11,244 ft (3,427 m)
- Prominence: 1,122 ft (342 m)
- Coordinates: 43°32′38″N 110°31′28″W

Geography
- Location within Wyoming
- Location: Teton County, Wyoming, U.S.
- Parent range: Gros Ventre Range
- Topo map(s): USGS Blue Miner Lake, WY

Sheep Mountain (11,244 feet (3,427 m)) is located in the U.S. state of Wyoming. Sheep Mountain forms a 5-mile (8 km) long ridge in the Gros Ventre Range and is easily seen from Jackson Hole. The town of Jackson is 13 miles (21 km) southwest of the peak. The southern end of Sheep Mountain is above the tree line and consists of rocky cliffs that are referred to as the "Sleeping Indian" due to their appearance as viewed from Jackson Hole. Sheep Mountain is in the Gros Ventre Wilderness of Bridger–Teton National Forest. At the northern end of Sheep Mountain is the location of the Gros Ventre landslide.

In 1996, a U.S. Air Force C-130 Hercules cargo plane carrying an automobile and equipment outbound from Jackson Hole crashed into Sheep Mountain, killing a U.S. Secret Service agent and eight Air Force personnel. The cargo plane was transporting equipment to another destination after U.S. President Bill Clinton and his family had vacationed in Jackson Hole the previous week.
