= Wyoming Range =

Mountain range in Wyoming, United States

Coordinates: 42°44′02″N 110°36′46″W

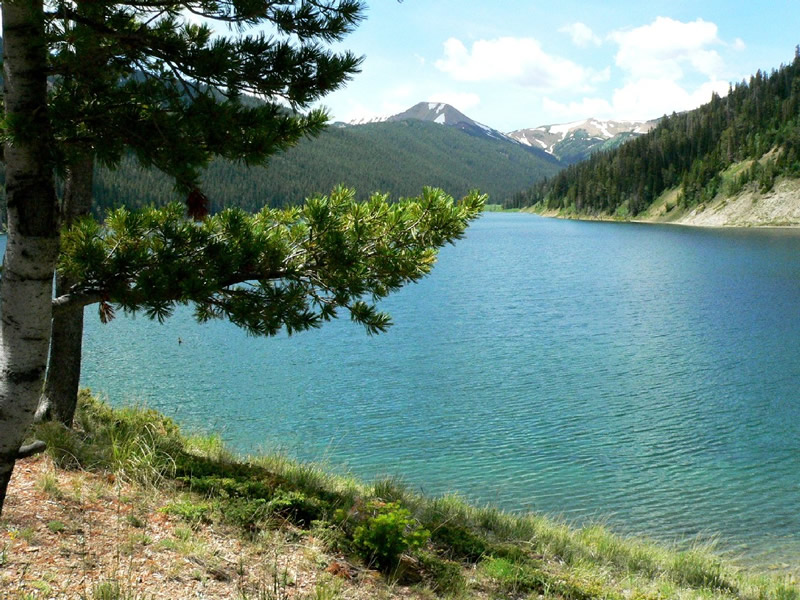
Middle Piney Lake, in the Wyoming Range. Wyoming Peak is shown in the background

The Wyoming Range is a mountain range located in western Wyoming. It is a range of the Rocky Mountains that runs north-south near the western edge of the state. Its highest peak is Wyoming Peak, which stands at 11,383 feet (3,470 m) above sea-level. The range is sometimes referred to as The Wyomings.

The vast majority of the range is public land administered by the U.S. Forest Service as part of the Bridger-Teton National Forest and is a popular destination for hiking, camping, fishing, horseback riding, snowmobiling, hunting, and other activities. The range contains numerous lakes and developed campgrounds, in addition to many wild and primitive areas. The closest towns to the range include Big Piney, Marbleton, La Barge, and Kemmerer.

A branch of the Oregon Trail known as the Lander Road traverses the mountain range. The cutoff offered emigrants a shorter travel option. Numerous grave sites and historical markers can be found relating to the trail.

The range is not to be confused with the Salt River Range, which runs closely parallel to the Wyoming Range on its western side. The two ranges are separated by Greys River that flows north through the Star Valley into the Snake River.

The United States House of Representatives voted March 25, 2009, to grant wilderness status to two million acres (8,000 km²) of public land in nine states. The Omnibus Public Land Management Act, which had already been passed by the Senate, was approved in the House by a 285-to-140 vote. It was signed into law March 30 by President Barack Obama. The legislation included the Wyoming Range Legacy Act, which shields 1,200,000 acres (4,900 km^{2}) of the Wyoming Range from future oil and gas leasing. Leases that were issued in the 1,200,000 acres (4,900 km^{2}) withdrawal area prior to passage of the Omnibus Public Land Management Act were not affected by the legislation.

== See also ==
- Lake Alice (Wyoming)
- List of mountain ranges in Wyoming
