= Ventre =

Ventre is a surname. Notable people with the surname include:

- Danny Ventre (born 1986), English footballer
- Mariele Ventre (1939–1995), Italian musician and singer
- Riccardo Ventre (born 1944), Italian politician

== See also ==
- Gros Ventre (disambiguation)
