= Greys River =

River in Wyoming, United States

Coordinates: 43°00′00″N 110°48′00″W

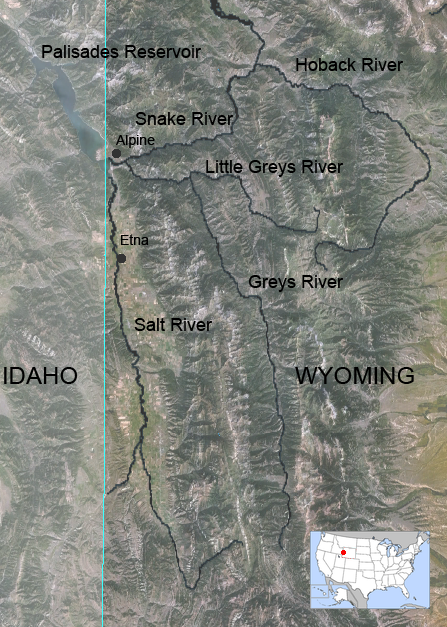
Greys River's location.

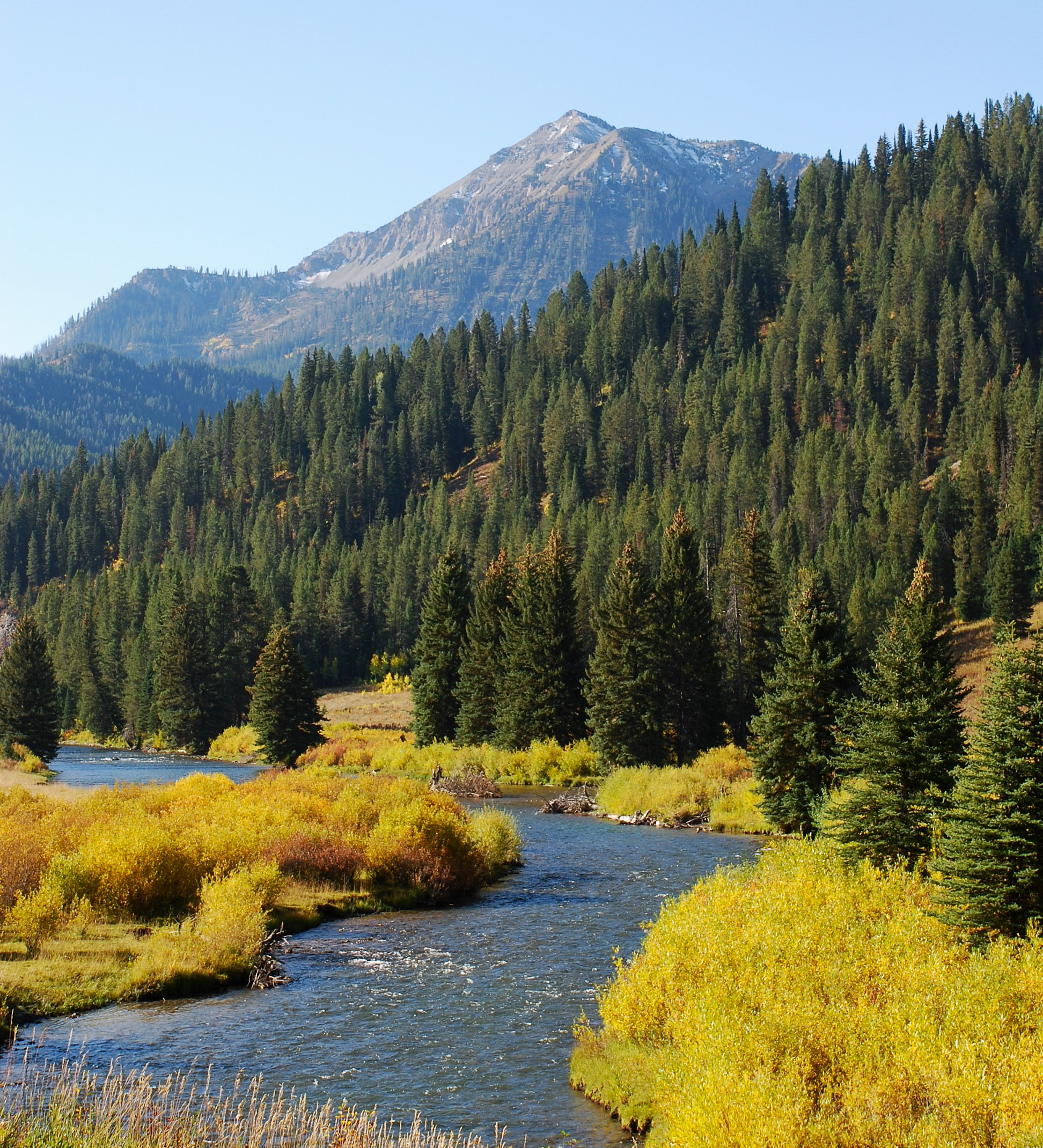
Greys River and Man Peak

The Greys River is a tributary of the Snake River, flowing through western Wyoming in the United States. The river is about 62 miles (100 km) long, starting high up in the Wyoming Range, 45 miles (72 km) south of the town of Alpine in Lincoln County. The river eventually flows into the Snake River in the Snake River Canyon, joining it just east of Alpine. The Greys River is generally a rushing mountain stream that separates the high Wyoming Range (east) from the Salt River Range (west). It joins the Snake River just above the intersection of U.S. highways 89 and 26. Just a short distance downriver from the confluence of the two rivers, the Snake widens quickly and passes through Alpine and enters the Palisades Reservoir. The largest tributary of the Greys River is the Little Greys River. At Alpine, Wyoming, the Greys River measures 654 cubic feet per second average. With a 180 cuft/s min. and a 3,004 max.

In 1997, Greys River hosted the second round of the World Fly Fishing Championships, and the dominant trout species in the system is the Snake River fine-spotted cutthroat.

== See also ==
- Hoback River
- Salt River
- List of rivers in Wyoming
