= Lower Slide Lake =

Lake in the American state of Wyoming

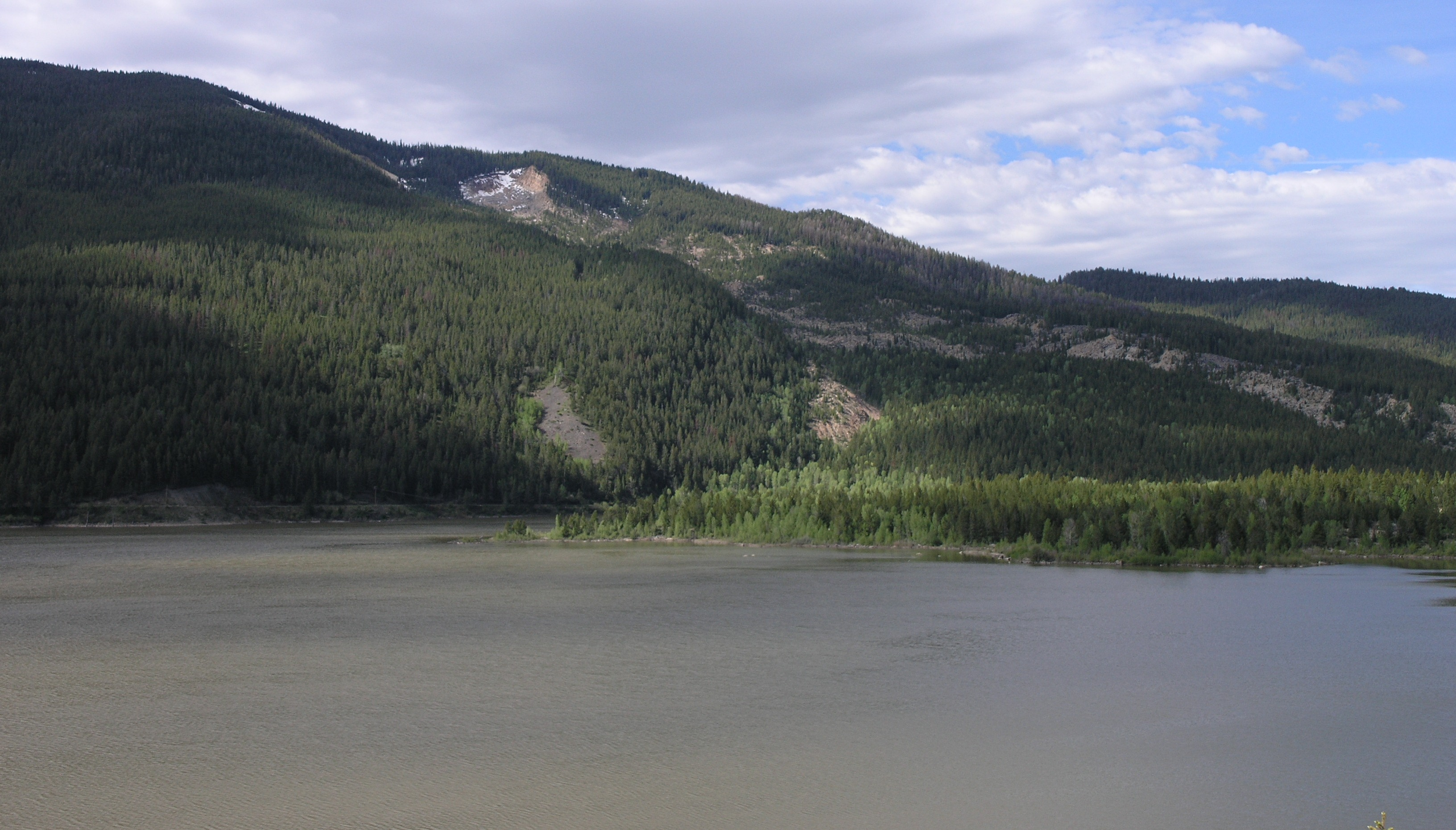
- with Gros Ventre landslide field right background

- Location within Wyoming Location within the United States
- Location: Bridger-Teton National Forest, Teton County, Wyoming, US
- Coordinates: 43°37′55″N 110°31′48″W
- Type: Natural lake
- Primary inflows: Gros Ventre River
- Basin countries: United States
- Max. length: 2 mi (3.2 km)
- Max. width: .5 mi (0.80 km)
- Surface area: 650 acres (260 ha)
- Surface elevation: 6,908 ft (2,106 m)

Lower Slide Lake is located in Bridger-Teton National Forest, in the U.S. state of Wyoming. The natural lake was created on June 23, 1925, when the Gros Ventre landslide dammed the Gros Ventre River. The lake was once much larger, however part of the rock dam failed less than two years later, on May 18, 1927, causing deadly flooding downstream. The lake waters have natural and stocked fish including lake and Snake River fine-spotted cutthroat trout, and mountain whitefish.

== See also ==
- Geology of the Grand Teton area
