= Doubletop Peak =

Mountain in Wyoming, United States

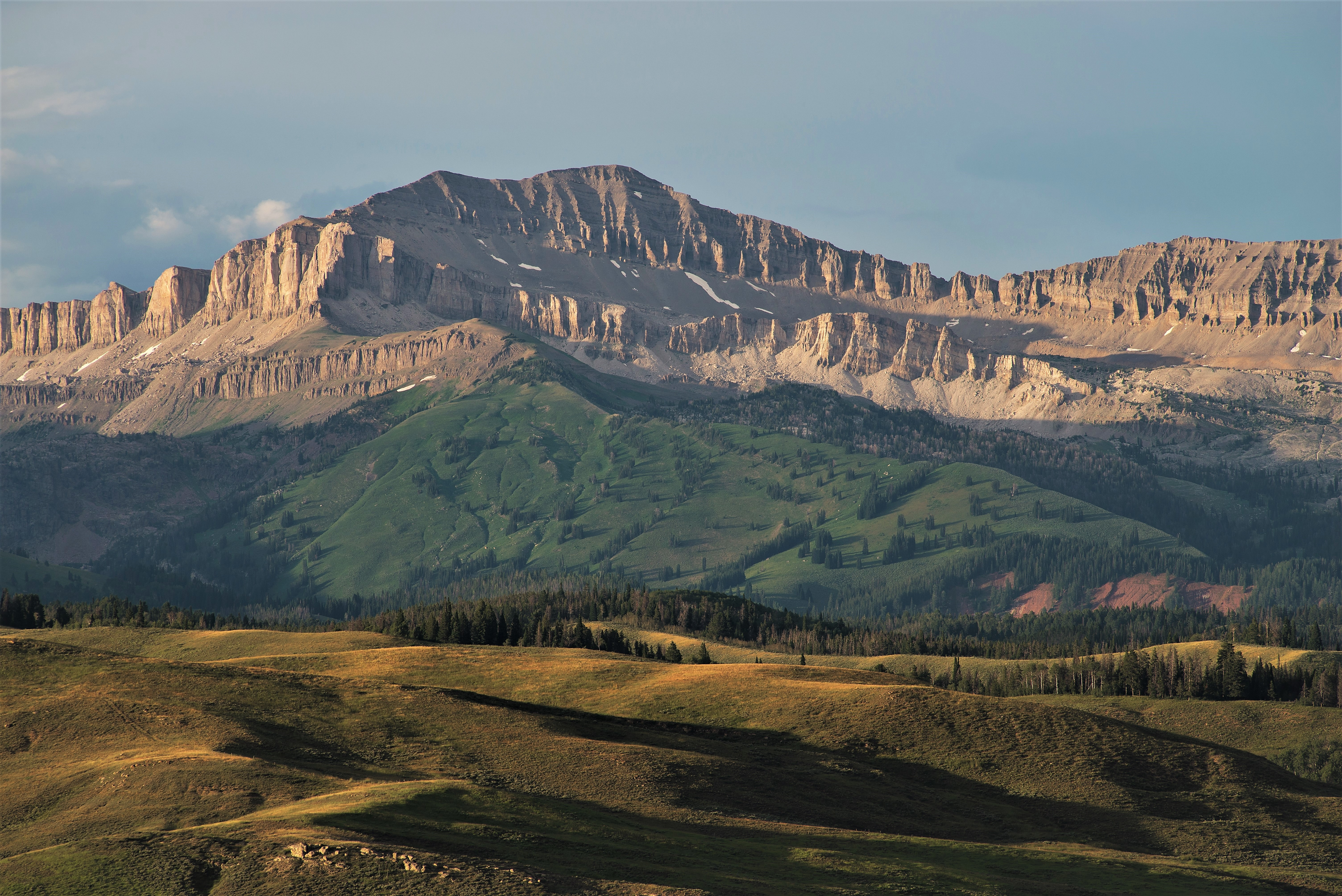
- South aspect

Highest point
- Elevation: 11,720 ft (3,570 m)
- Prominence: 2,960 ft (900 m)
- Coordinates: 43°20′55″N 110°17′13″W

Geography
- Location within Wyoming Location within the United States
- Location: Sublette County, Wyoming, U.S.
- Parent range: Gros Ventre Range
- Topo map: USGS Doubletop Peak

Climbing
- Easiest route: Scramble

Doubletop Peak (11,720–11,760 feet (3,570–3,580 m)) is a mountain in the state of Wyoming. The peak is the tallest in the Gros Ventre Range. Doubletop Peak is within the Gros Ventre Wilderness region of Bridger-Teton National Forest.
