= Gros Ventre landslide =

1925 landslide in Wyoming, United States

Coordinates: 43°37′14″N 110°32′58″W

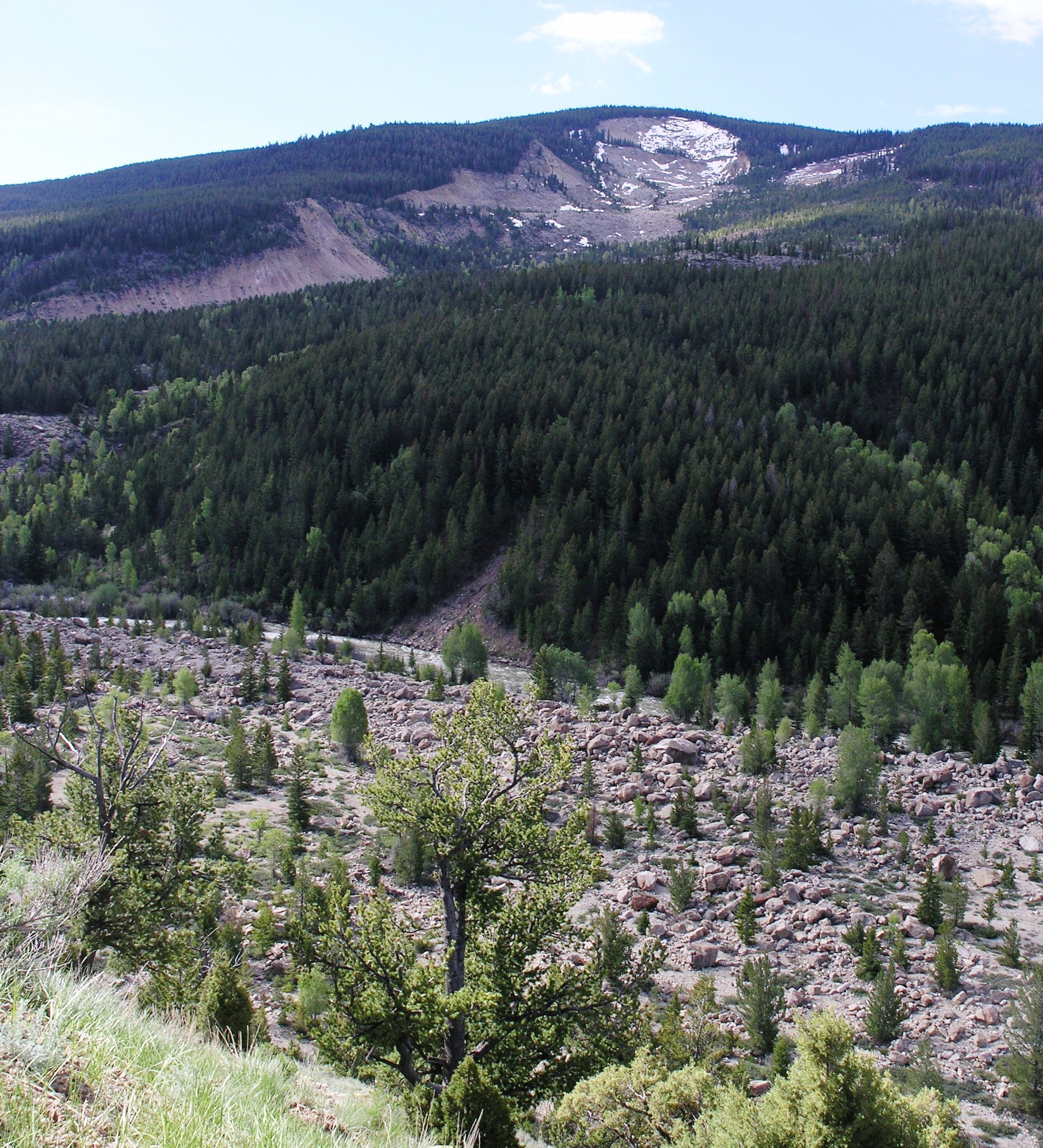
Gros Ventre landslide scar visible on mountainside with debris field in foreground.

The Gros Ventre landslide (/ˌɡroʊ ˈvɑːnt/ groh-VAHNT) is in the Gros Ventre Wilderness of Bridger-Teton National Forest, Wyoming, United States. The Gros Ventre landslide is seven miles (11 km) east of Jackson Hole valley and Grand Teton National Park.

The landslide occurred on June 23, 1925, following melt from a heavy snowpack, several weeks of heavy rain, and earthquake tremors in the area. Approximately 50,000,000 cu yd (38,000,000 m^{3}; 1.4×10^{9} cu ft) of primarily sedimentary rock slid down the north face of Sheep Mountain, crossed over the Gros Ventre River and rode up the opposite mountainside a distance of 300 feet (91 m). The landslide created a large dam over 200 feet (61 m) high and 400 yards (370 m) wide across the Gros Ventre River, backing up the water and forming Lower Slide Lake.

On May 18, 1927, part of the landslide dam failed, resulting in a massive flood that was six feet (1.8 m) deep for at least 25 miles (40 km) downstream. The small town of Kelly, six miles (9.7 km) downstream, was wiped out, killing six people. It is one of the world's largest known examples of recent mass wasting events aside from volcanic eruptions. Slide Lake is now much smaller than before the flood.

Today, the landslide is partially reclaimed by the surrounding forest but is still an obvious landmark from many vantage points in the Jackson Hole valley. It is easily accessible by traveling north from Jackson, Wyoming or south from Moran, Wyoming and then taking the Antelope Flats road east off U.S. Route 26.

== Etymology ==
In French, Gros Ventre means big belly / big stomach.
