= Gros Ventre River =

Coordinates: 43°32′44″N 110°47′54″W

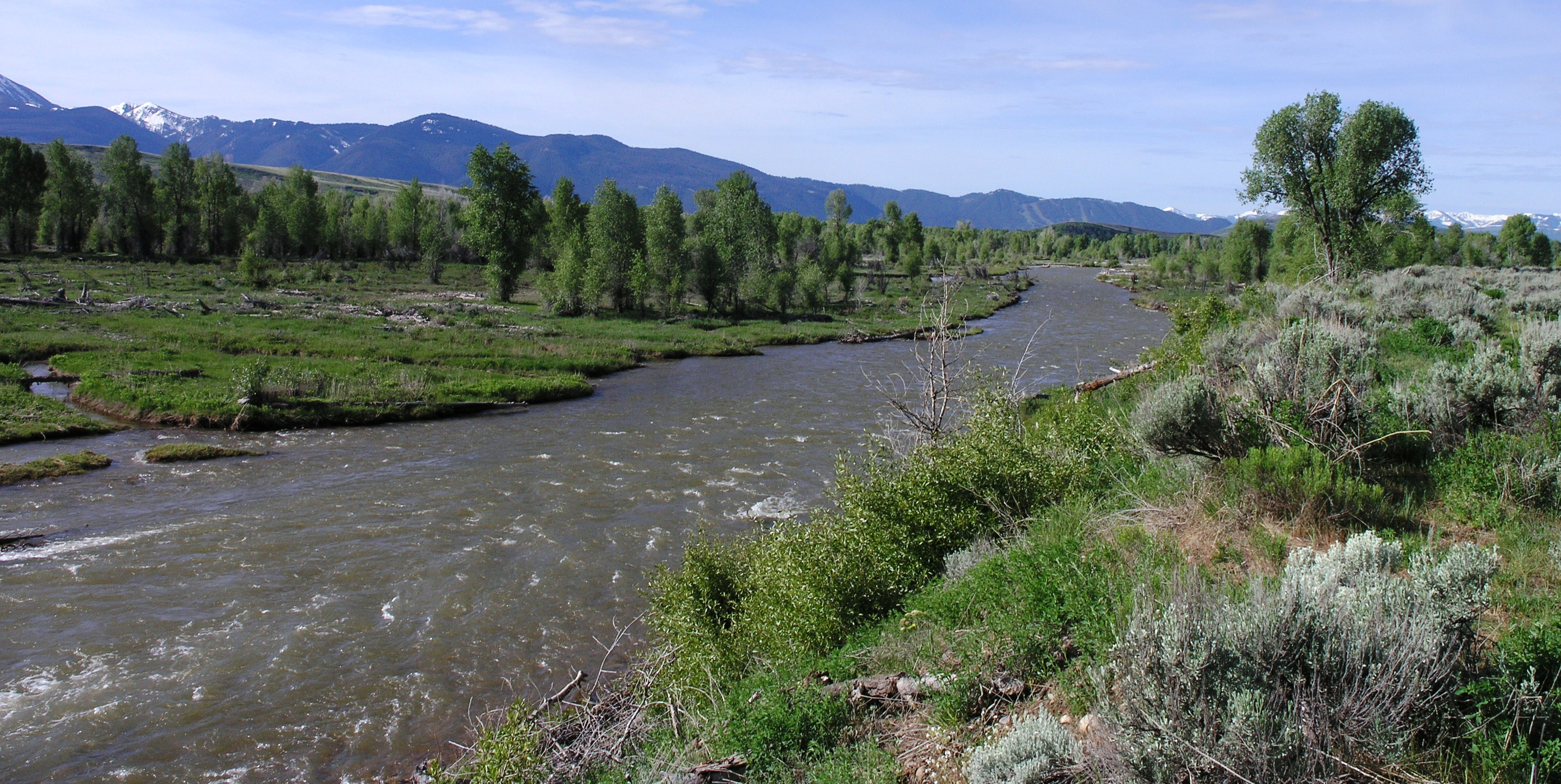
- Gros Ventre River

National Wild and Scenic River

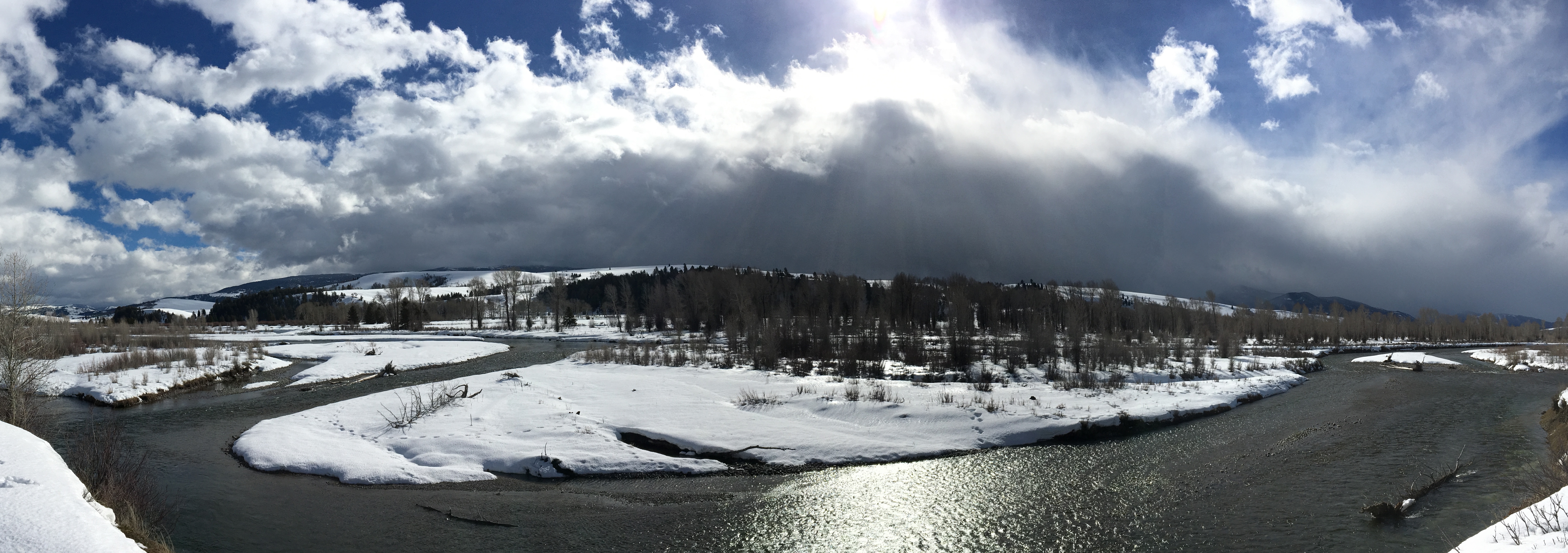
The Gros Ventre River is the largest watercourse on the National Elk Refuge

The Gros Ventre River (pronounced GROW-VAUNT) is a 74.6-mile-long (120.1 km) tributary of the Snake River in the state of Wyoming, USA. During its short course, the river flows to the east, north, west, then southwest. It rises in the Gros Ventre Wilderness in western Wyoming, and joins the Snake River in the Jackson Hole valley. In 1925, the massive Gros Ventre landslide dammed the river and formed Lower Slide Lake. The natural dam collapsed in 1927, flooding the downstream town of Kelly, Wyoming. The river is noted for the excellent trout fishing along its length, where native Snake River Fine-spotted Cutthroat Trout average 12 to 16 inches (300 to 410 mm), with some to 20 inches (510 mm).
