= Leidy (name) =

Leidy is a surname and given name. Notable people with the name include:

surname

- Joseph Leidy (1823–1891), American paleontologist
- Paul Leidy (1813–1877), American politician

given name

- Leidy Asprilla (1997–2019), Colombian footballer
- Leidy Churchman (born 1979), American painter
- Leidy Klotz, American engineer
- Leidy Natalia Muñoz Ruiz (born 1985), Colombian racing cyclist
