= Mount Leidy =

Mountain in Wyoming, United States

Coordinates: 43°43′31.21″N 110°24′19.82″W

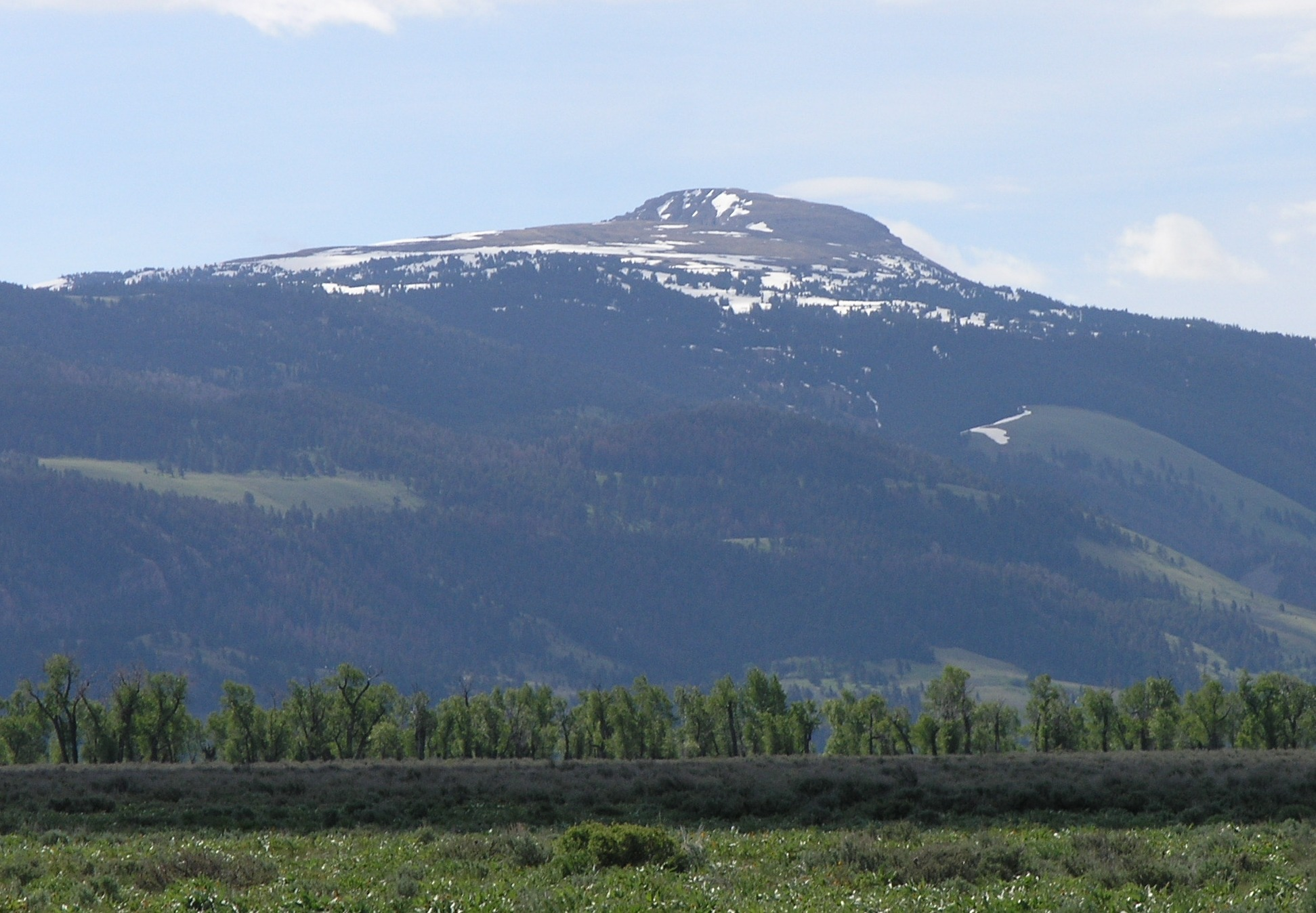
Mount Leidy from Grand Teton National Park

Mount Leidy is a summit in Teton County, Wyoming, in the United States. With an elevation of 10,233 feet (3,119 m), Mount Leidy is the 424th highest summit in the state of Wyoming.

The mountain was named for Joseph Leidy, an American paleontologist.
