= Granite Hot Springs, Wyoming =

Hot spring in Sublette County, Wyoming

Granite Hot Springs
- Location: Sublette County, Wyoming
- Coordinates: 43.3678°N 110.4463°W

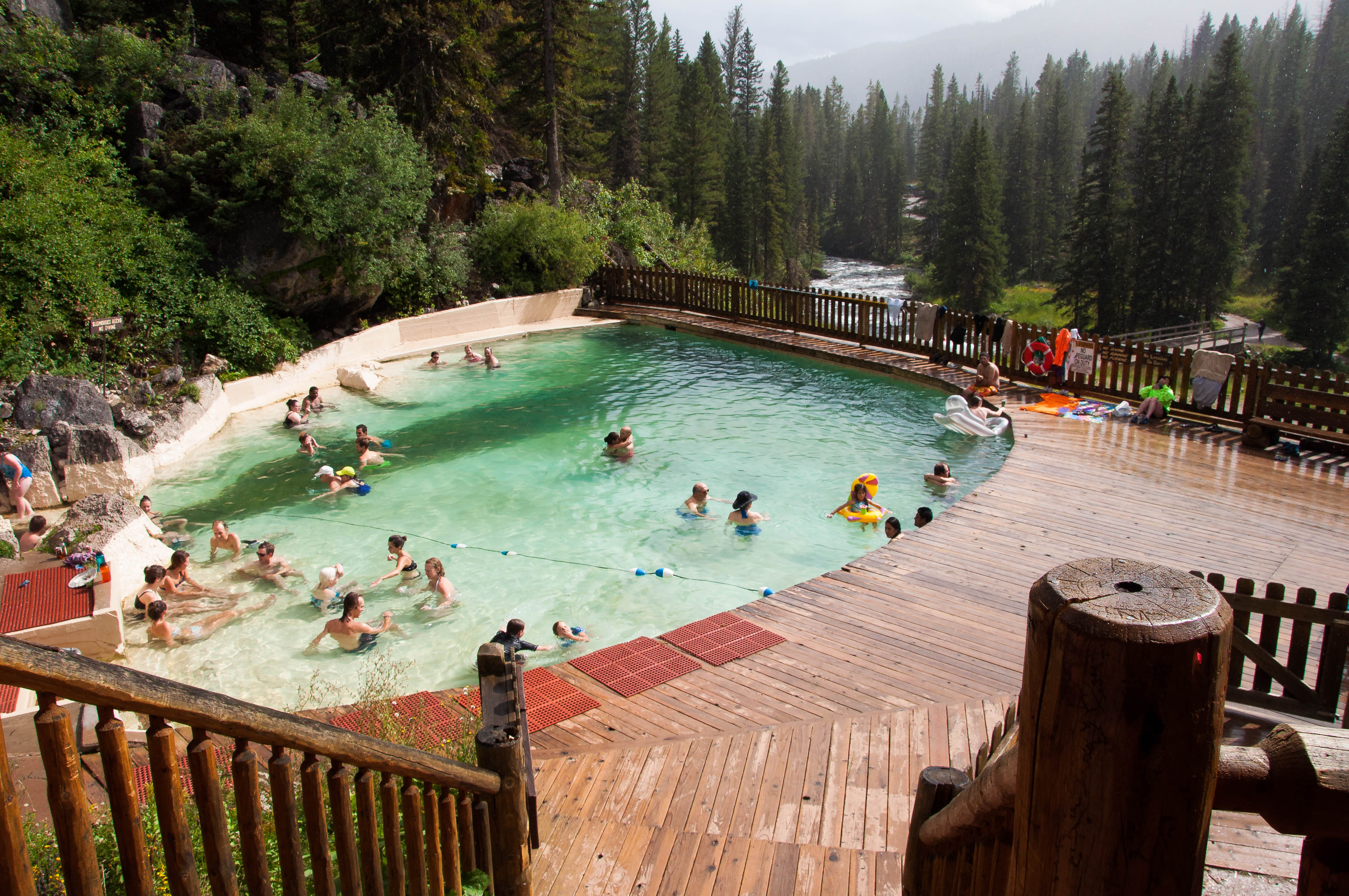
Granite Hot Springs pool

Granite Hot Springs is a hot spring located in Sublette County, Wyoming, 30 miles (48 km) southeast of Jackson. It is maintained by the United States Forest Service. Early settlers in the region dug a pool to collect the water. The Civilian Conservation Corps enhanced the pool in 1933 according to the sign at the pool, adding a campground, changing room, and deck. There is also a primitive pool located at Granite Falls, about 1/2 mile downstream, which was one of the locations used to shoot the 1992 film A River Runs Through It.

During the summer, the pool can be accessed by car. In the winter, visitors must access it by skis, snowshoes, snowmobile or dogsled. In winter, the pool temperature may be up to 112 °F (44 °C) degrees. During peak snowmelt in spring, the temperature may drop into the 80s, and be in the mid-90s during the summer.

In July 2007, the Granite Creek Fire threatened the springs, blackening over 1,700 acres (2.656 sq mi; 6.880 km^{2}).
