= Bridger–Teton National Forest =

Protected area in western Wyoming, US

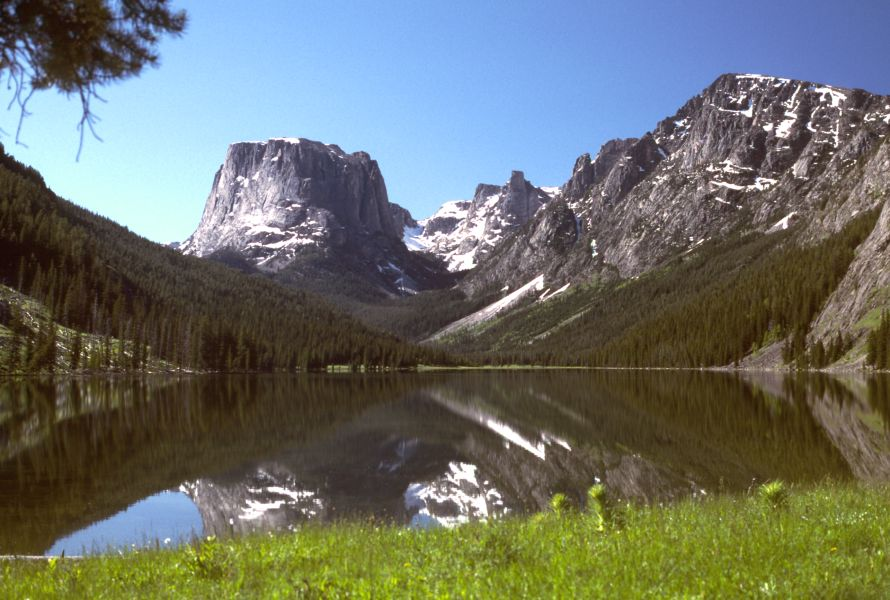
- Green Lakes region of Bridger–Teton National Forest

- Location within the United States
- Location: Wyoming, United States
- Nearest city: Jackson, Wyoming
- Coordinates: 43°25′48″N 110°43′30″W
- Area: 3,402,684 acres (13,770.17 km^{2})
- Established: July 1, 1908
- Governing body: U.S. Forest Service
- Website: www.fs.usda.gov/r04/bridger-teton

Interactive map of Bridger–Teton National Forest

Bridger–Teton National Forest is located in western Wyoming, United States. The forest consists of 3.4 million acres (14,000 square kilometers), making it the third largest National Forest outside Alaska. The forest stretches from Yellowstone National Park, along the eastern boundary of Grand Teton National Park and from there rides along the western slope of the Continental Divide to the southern end of the Wind River Range. The forest also extends southward encompassing the Salt River Range and Wyoming Range mountains near the Idaho border.

== Geography ==
Located within the forest are the Gros Ventre, Bridger and Teton Wildernesses, totaling 1.2 million acres (4,900 square kilometers). Other points of interest contained in the forest include Gannett Peak at 13,804 feet (4,207 m), the tallest mountain in Wyoming, and the Gros Ventre landslide, which is one of the largest readily visible landslides on earth. All of the forest is in turn a part of the 20-million-acre (81,000-square-kilometer) Greater Yellowstone Ecosystem.

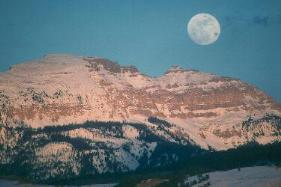
Moonrise over Sleeping Indian Peak Bridger–Teton National Forest

While Gannett Peak is the highest summit in the forest, another 40 named mountains rise above 12,000 ft (3,660 m). The high altitudes and abundant snowfall, exceeding 600 inches (15 m) at some locations, provides a constant supply of water for streams and rivers. 1,500 lakes also help provide water for the Yellowstone, Snake and Green rivers, which all have their headwaters in the forest. Seven of the largest glaciers outside of Alaska are located within the forest boundaries.

U.S. Route 26 and U.S. Route 287 cross over the continental divide at Togwotee Pass and enter the forest from the north, and U.S. Highways 89 and 191 provide access to the forest in the vicinity of Jackson, Wyoming and forest lands to the south.

== Ecology ==
The primary tree species include lodgepole pine, Engelmann spruce, Douglas fir, subalpine fir, aspen and whitebark pine. Willows, grasses and sagebrush are found on the lower altitudes, while above the timberline alpine meadows are common. Threatened and endangered species found within the forest boundaries include grizzly bear, gray wolf, black-footed ferret and peregrine falcon. Most of the mammals that existed in the region prior to European settlement can still be found here. Elk, moose, mule deer, bighorn sheep, bison, coyote, marmot, pronghorn, and cougar are but a few of the 75 species of mammals known to exist in the forest. Four subspecies of cutthroat trout also are found here including the Snake River cutthroat trout. 355 species of birds have been sighted including bald eagles, trumpeter swans, sandhill cranes, hawks, and Clark's nutcrackers.

== Recreation ==
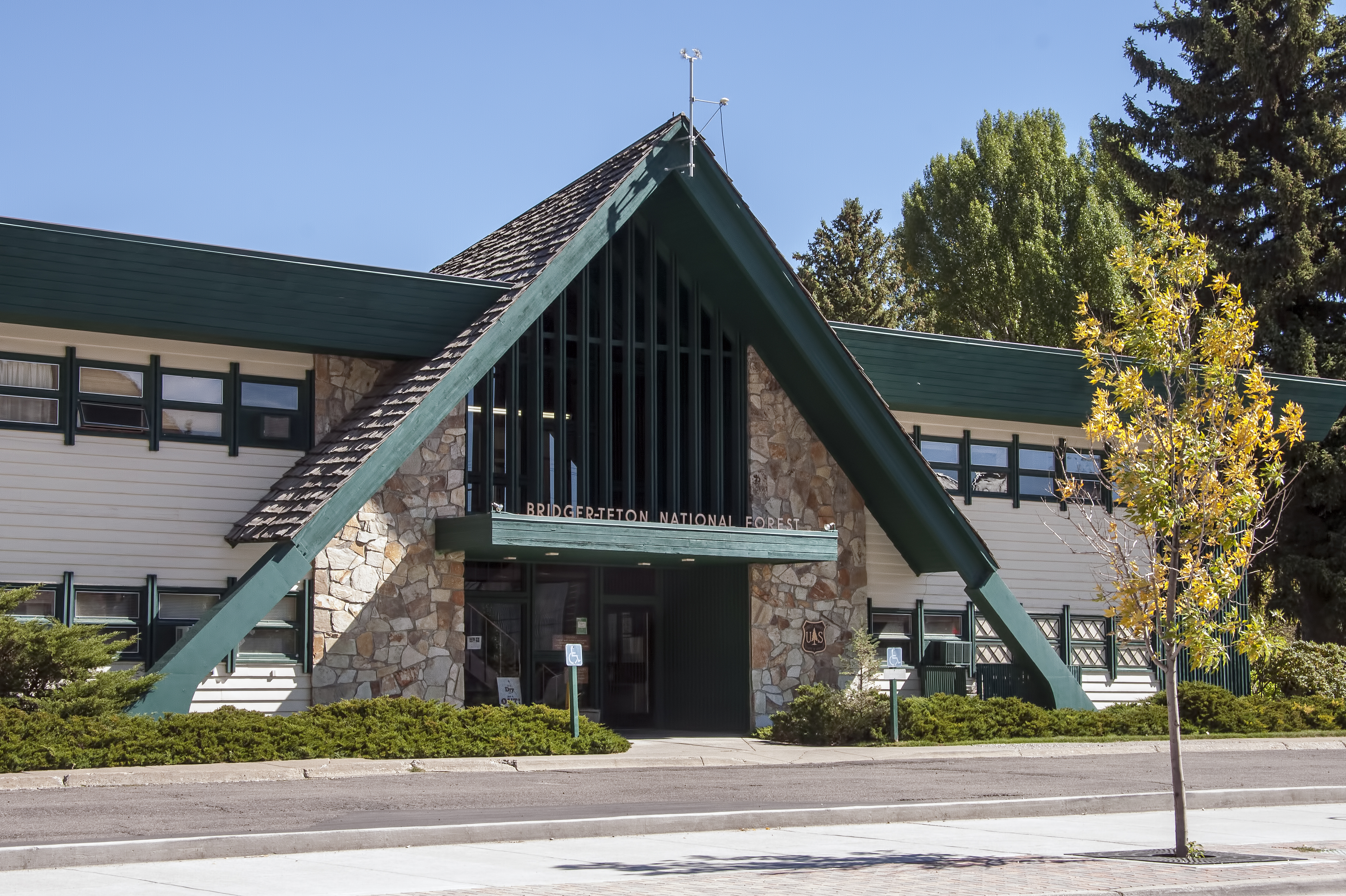
Bridger–Teton National Forest headquarters in Jackson, Wyoming

Over 2,000 mi (3,200 km) of hiking trails are located in the forest providing access into wilderness areas and interlinking with trails in Yellowstone National Park. There are several dozen vehicle accessible campgrounds that have picnic tables and tent sites as well as room in some circumstances for recreational vehicles. Nighttime temperatures can be below freezing any time of the year and mosquitos in the late spring and early summer are common. Summertime high temperatures average at 70 to 79 °F (21 to 26 °C) and the wintertime lows can drop below −50 °F (−46 °C).

== Administration ==
Bridger–Teton National Forest is an administrative combination of Bridger and Teton National Forests, amalgamated in 1973. The Bridger National Forest itself absorbed Wyoming National Forest in 1923. The Wyoming National Forest had been created as the Yellowstone Forest Reserve in 1904, then renamed in 1908. The Teton Forest Reserve was created at the same time, destined to become Teton National Forest.

Ranger district offices are located in Pinedale, Kemmerer, Big Piney, Moran, Afton and Jackson. The forest headquarters is located in Jackson. In descending order of land area the forest is located in parts of Sublette, Teton, Lincoln, Park, and Fremont counties.

== Hazards ==
Encountering bears is a concern in the Wind River Range. There are other concerns as well, including bugs, wildfires, adverse snow conditions and nighttime cold temperatures.

Importantly, there have been notable incidents, including accidental deaths, due to falls from steep cliffs (a misstep could be fatal in this class 4/5 terrain) and due to falling rocks, over the years, including 1993, 2007 (involving an experienced NOLS leader), 2015 and 2018. Other incidents include a seriously injured backpacker being airlifted near SquareTop Mountain in 2005, and a fatal hiker incident (from an apparent accidental fall) in 2006 that involved state search and rescue. The U.S. Forest Service does not offer updated aggregated records on the official number of fatalities in the Wind River Range.

== Gallery ==
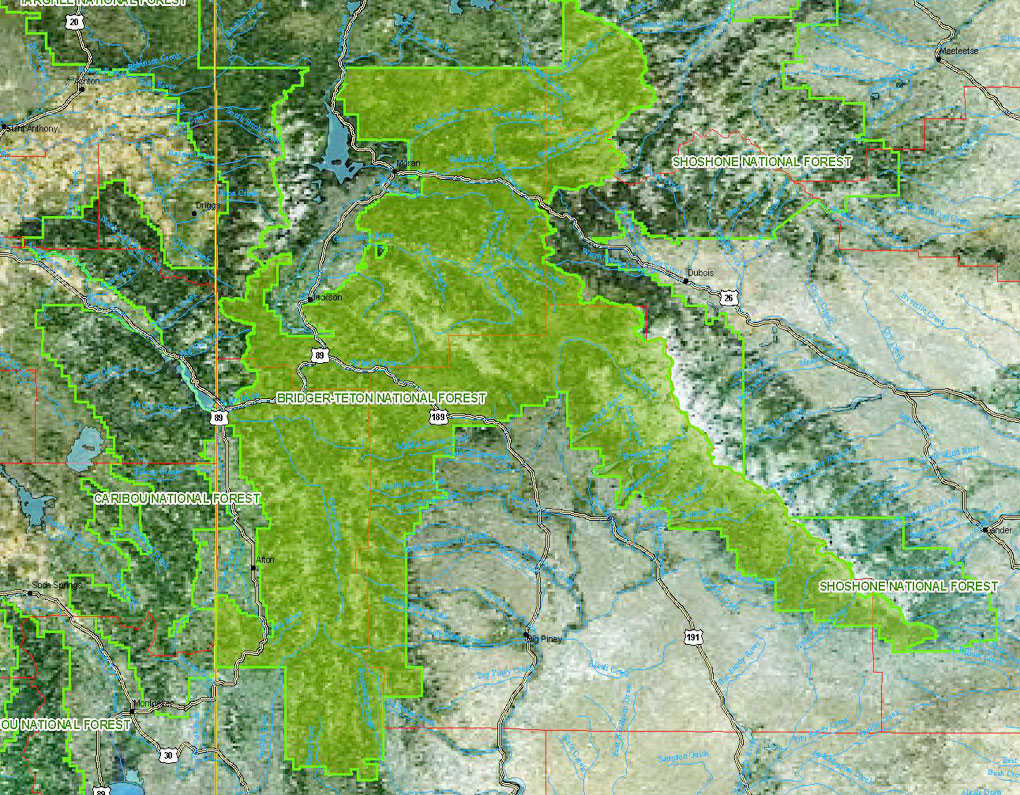
Bridger–Teton National Forest Map

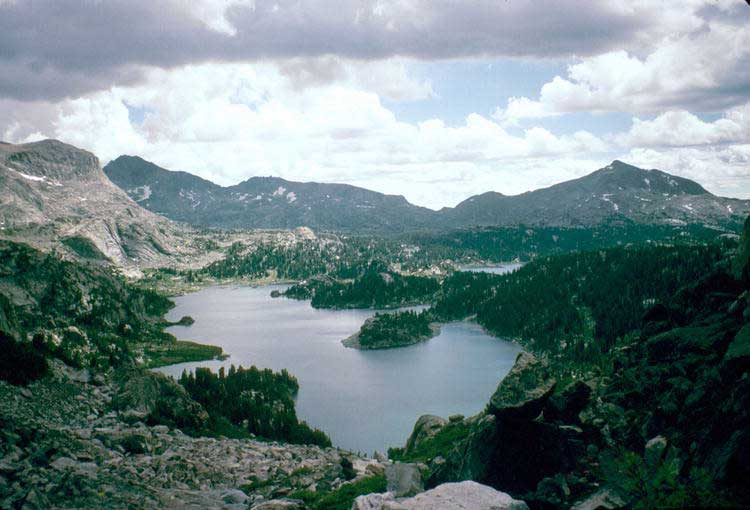
Cook Lake

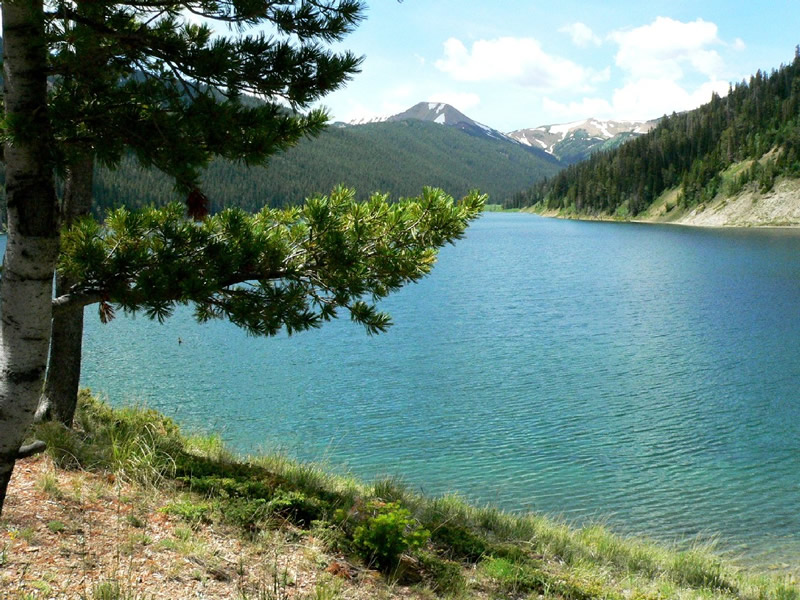
Middle Piney Lake

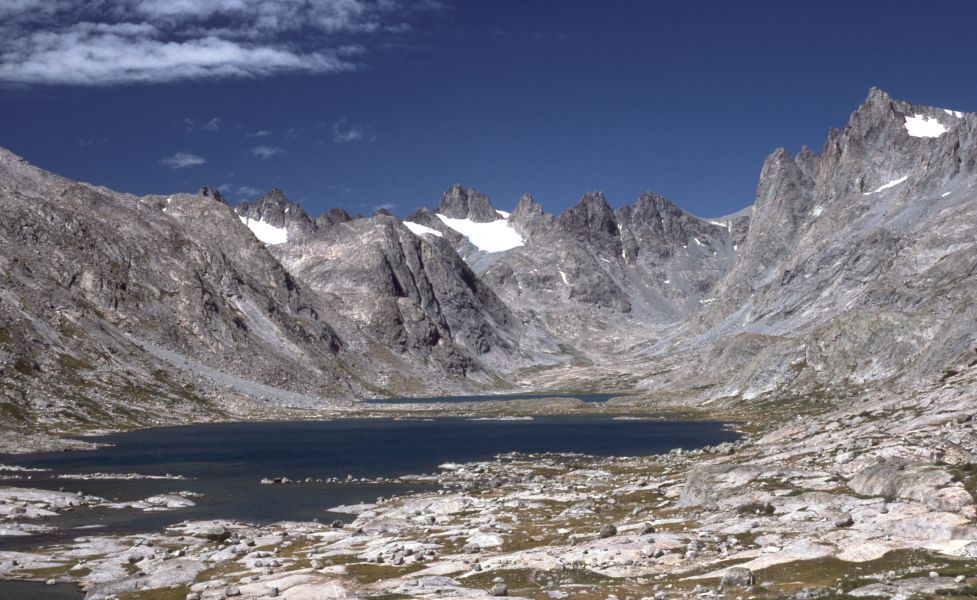
Titcomb Lakes

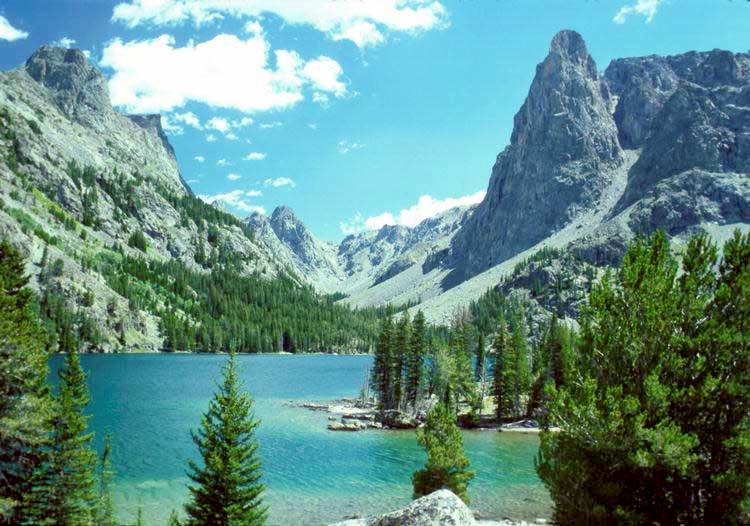
Slide Lake

== See also ==
- List of national forests of the United States
- Granite Hot Springs
- Green River
- Wilderness areas:
  - Bridger Wilderness
  - Gros Ventre Wilderness
  - Teton Wilderness
