= Salt River Range =

Mountain range in Wyoming, United States

Coordinates: 42°46′N 110°51′W

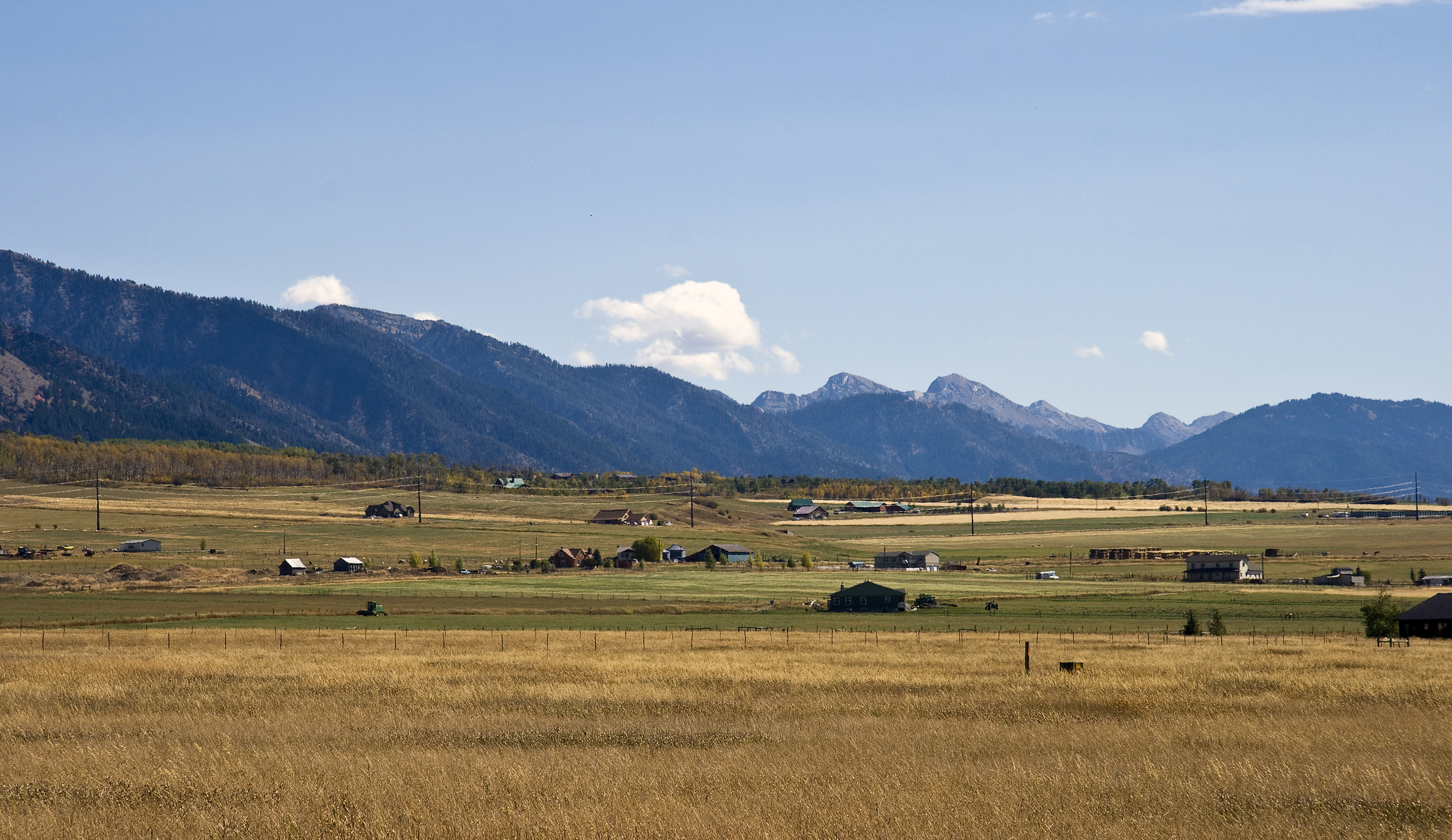
Salt River Range with Haystack Peak in the distance

The Salt River Range is a mountain range in western Wyoming. The 56-mile-long (90 km) range forms the eastern boundary of Star Valley as well as the western boundary of the Greys River valley.

The highest point is Mount Fitzpatrick at 10,907 feet (3,324 m).

== See also ==
- List of mountain ranges in Wyoming

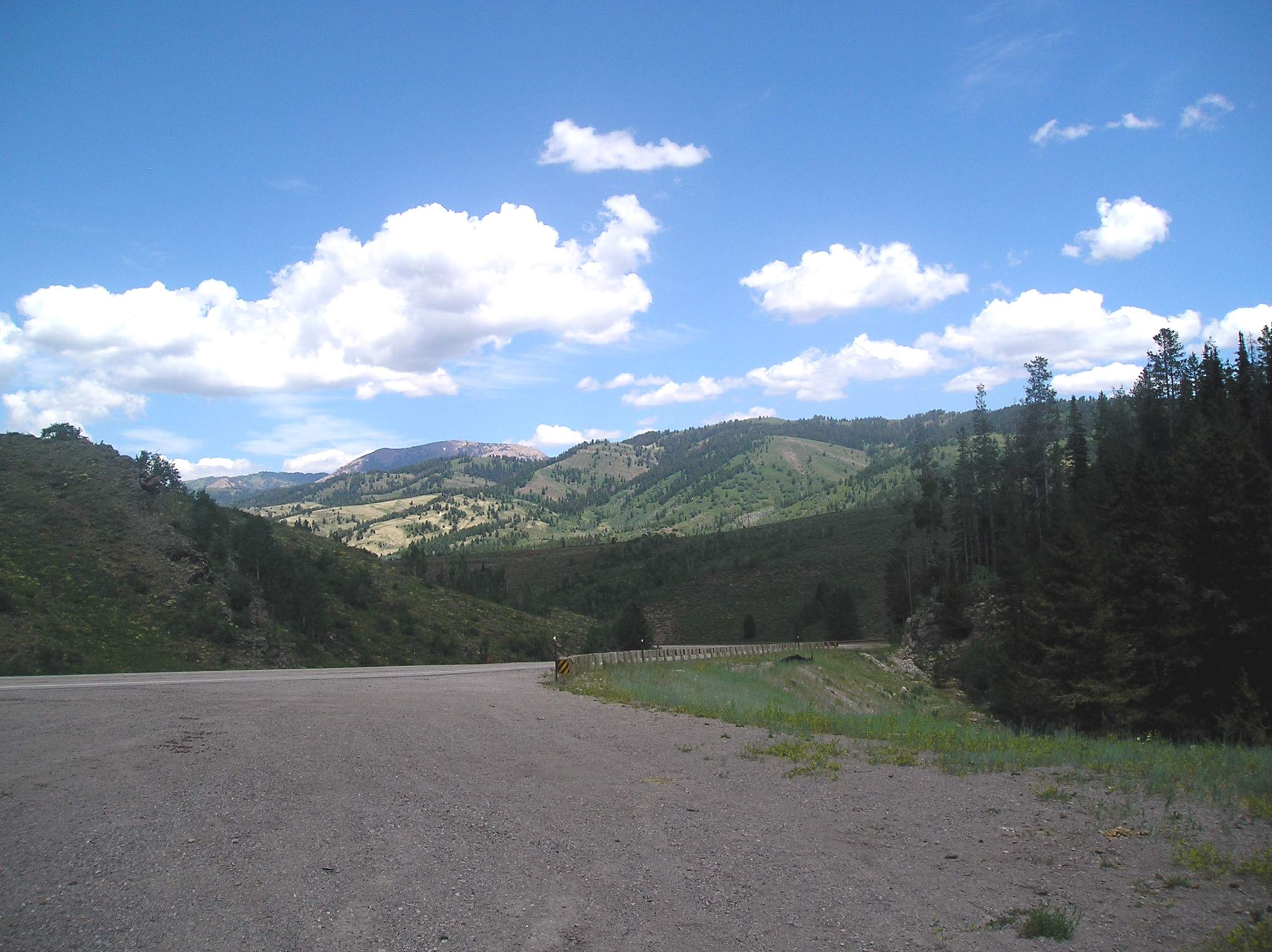
Salt River Range in Wyoming
