= Gros Ventre Wilderness =

Wilderness area within Bridger-Teton National Forest

- IUCN category Ib (wilderness area)
- Location within Wyoming Location within the United States
- Location: Teton / Sublette counties, Wyoming, USA
- Nearest city: Jackson, WY
- Coordinates: 43°28′15″N 110°24′32″W
- Area: 317,874 acres (1,286.39 km^{2})
- Established: 1984
- Governing body: U.S. Forest Service

The Gros Ventre Wilderness (/ˌɡroʊ ˈvɑːnt/ groh-VAHNT) is located in Bridger-Teton National Forest in the U.S. state of Wyoming. Most of the Gros Ventre Range is located within the wilderness.

U.S. Wilderness Areas do not allow motorized or mechanized vehicles, including bicycles. Although camping and fishing are allowed with proper permit, no roads or buildings are constructed and there is also no logging or mining, in compliance with the 1964 Wilderness Act. Wilderness areas within National Forests and Bureau of Land Management areas also allow hunting in season.

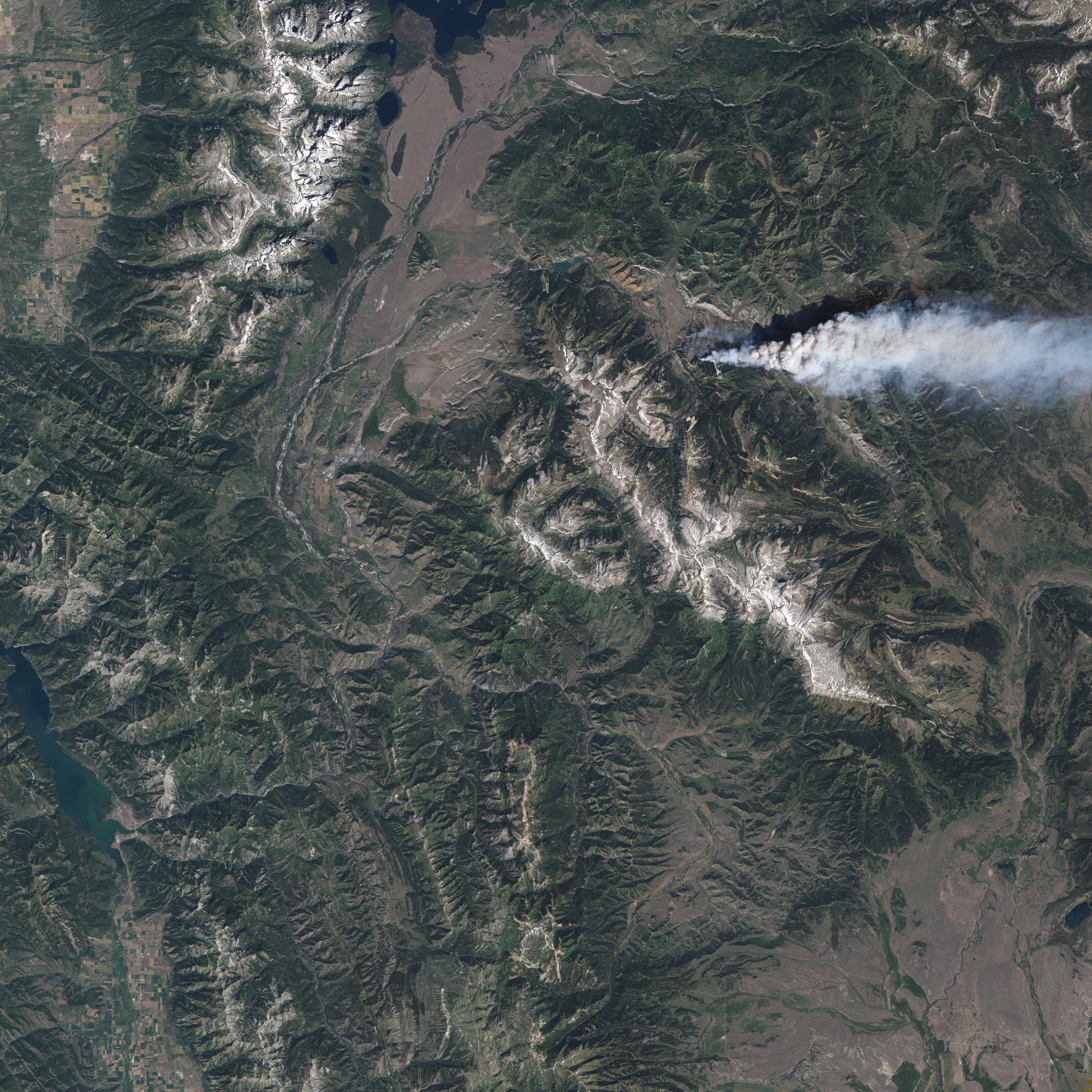
Satellite image of the Red Rock fire in the Gros Ventre Wilderness.

Etymology : In French, Gros Ventre means big belly / big stomach.

== See also ==
- List of U.S. Wilderness Areas
