= Watchtower (disambiguation) =

A watchtower is a type of fortification.

Watchtower or Watch Tower may also refer to:

== Buildings and structures ==
- Fire lookout tower, a tower usually located at a high vantage point to see any trace of fire and call for fire suppression
- Observation tower, a stand-alone structure used to view events from a long distance and to create a full 360 degree range of vision
- Watchtower (agricultural), a hut used in the ancient Middle East for watching over farmland and storing harvested produce
- The Watchtower, a previous name for Vision Theatre

== Places ==
- The Watchtower (Alberta), a mountain summit in the Canadian Rockies
- The Watchtower (Antarctica), a rock mass on the southeast extremity of James Ross Island, Antarctica
- Watch Tower (mountain), a mountain in the Wind River Range, Wyoming, U.S.
- Watchtower, New York, a census-designated place, United States

== Arts, entertainment and media ==
- Watchtower (2001 film)
- Justice League Watchtower, the name of various headquarters of the fictional superhero team "Justice League"
- Watchtower, the codename of the character Chloe Sullivan in the TV series Smallville

=== Literature ===
- The Watchtower, a magazine published by Jehovah's Witnesses

==== Novels ====
- Watchtower (novel), a 1979 novel in the Chronicles of Tornor series
- The Watch Tower, a 1966 novel by Elizabeth Harrower

=== Music ===
- Watchtower (band), an American progressive metal band

==== Songs ====
- "Watchtower" (song), a 2012 song by Devlin
- "Watchtower", a 1989 song by The Psychedelic Furs
- "Watchtower", a 1997 song by Echo & the Bunnymen on "Nothing Lasts Forever"
- "The Watchtower", a 2003 song by Cult of Luna on The Beyond
- "Watchtower", a 2007 song by Abigail Williams on Legend
- "Watchtower", a 2022 song by The Devil Wears Prada on Color Decay

== Magic and religion ==
- Watchtower (magic), a type of guardian spirit
- The Watch Tower Bible and Tract Society of Pennsylvania, a publishing company of Jehovah's Witnesses
- Watchtower movement, a religious and political movement in the Democratic Republic of the Congo

== Other uses ==
- Guadalcanal campaign, codenamed Operation Watchtower, a military campaign fought between 7 August 1942 and 9 February 1943
