= Nose (disambiguation) =

The nose is a protuberance in vertebrates which admits and expels air for respiration and contains olfactory receptors for sensing odors.

Nose may also refer to:

== Places ==
- Noše, a settlement in Slovenia
- Nose, Osaka, a town in Japan
- The Nose (El Capitan), a climbing route, California, US
- Big Nose and Little Nose, bluffs on the Mohawk River, Mohawk, New York, US

== Arts, entertainment, and media ==
- "The Nose" (Akutagawa short story), a 1916 short story by Ryūnosuke Akutagawa
- "The Nose" (Gogol short story), an 1836 short story by Nikolai Gogol
- The Nose (film), a 1977 Soviet TV film
- The Nose (magazine), a 1989–1995 California satirical magazine
- The Nose (opera), 1930 opera by Dmitri Shostakovich
- The Nose Book, a 1970 children's book by Al Perkins (children's writer)

== Transportation ==
- Nose Electric Railway, a Japanese private railway
- Nose Station, a train station in Tsubata, Ishikawa Prefecture, Japan
- Nose or gore, a triangular paved area at an intersection

== People ==
- Alberto Nosè (born 1979), Italian pianist
- Donita Nose (born 1979), Filipina comic, actress and TV host
- Seiki Nose (born 1952), Japanese judoka
- Nose Yoritsugu (1562–1626), Japanese samurai

== Other uses ==
- Nose, a perfumer
- Nose, a Python unit test framework
- Nose, the 1-pin in bowling
- Nose cone or nose, of an aircraft or spacecraft
- Nose or Cuberdon, a Belgian candy

== See also ==
- List of geographical noses, places called "nose"
- Noses Creek, Cobb County, Georgia, US
