= Terrace (earthworks) =

Terrain formed by tiered platforms

Terraced fields in the Jatiluwih district of Bali, Indonesia.

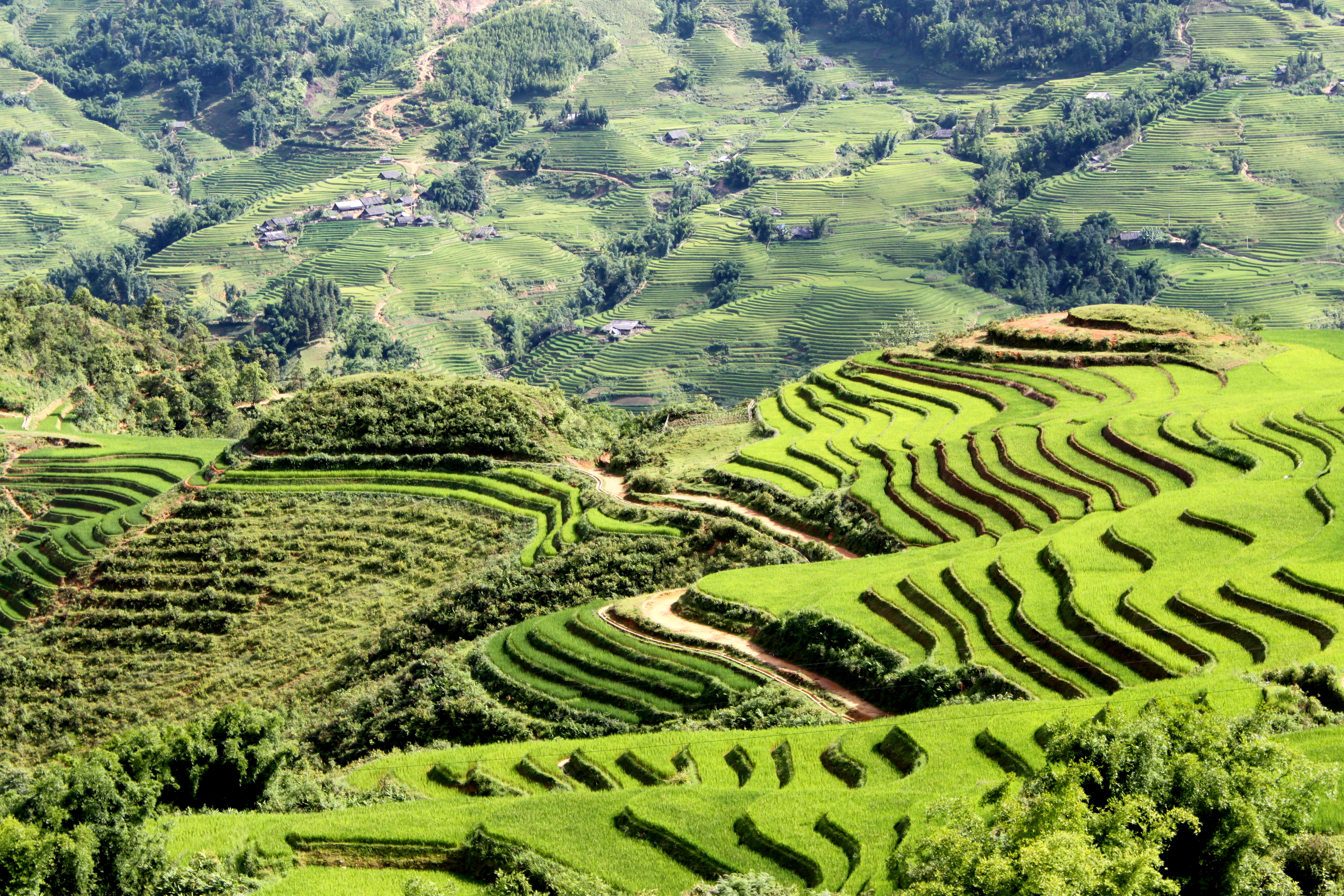
Rice terraces in Sa Pa, Vietnam.

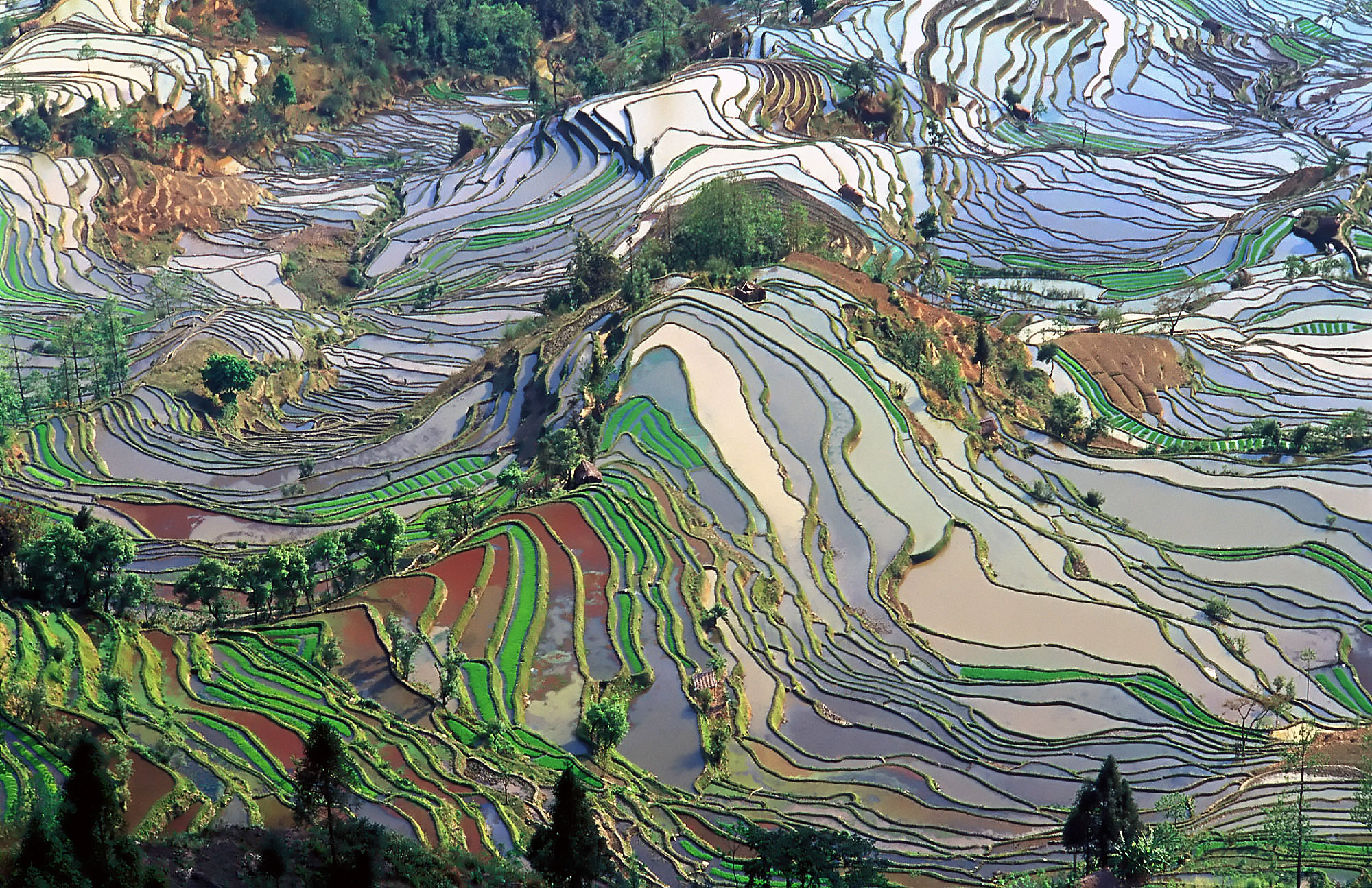
Rice terraces of the Hani people in Yunnan, China.

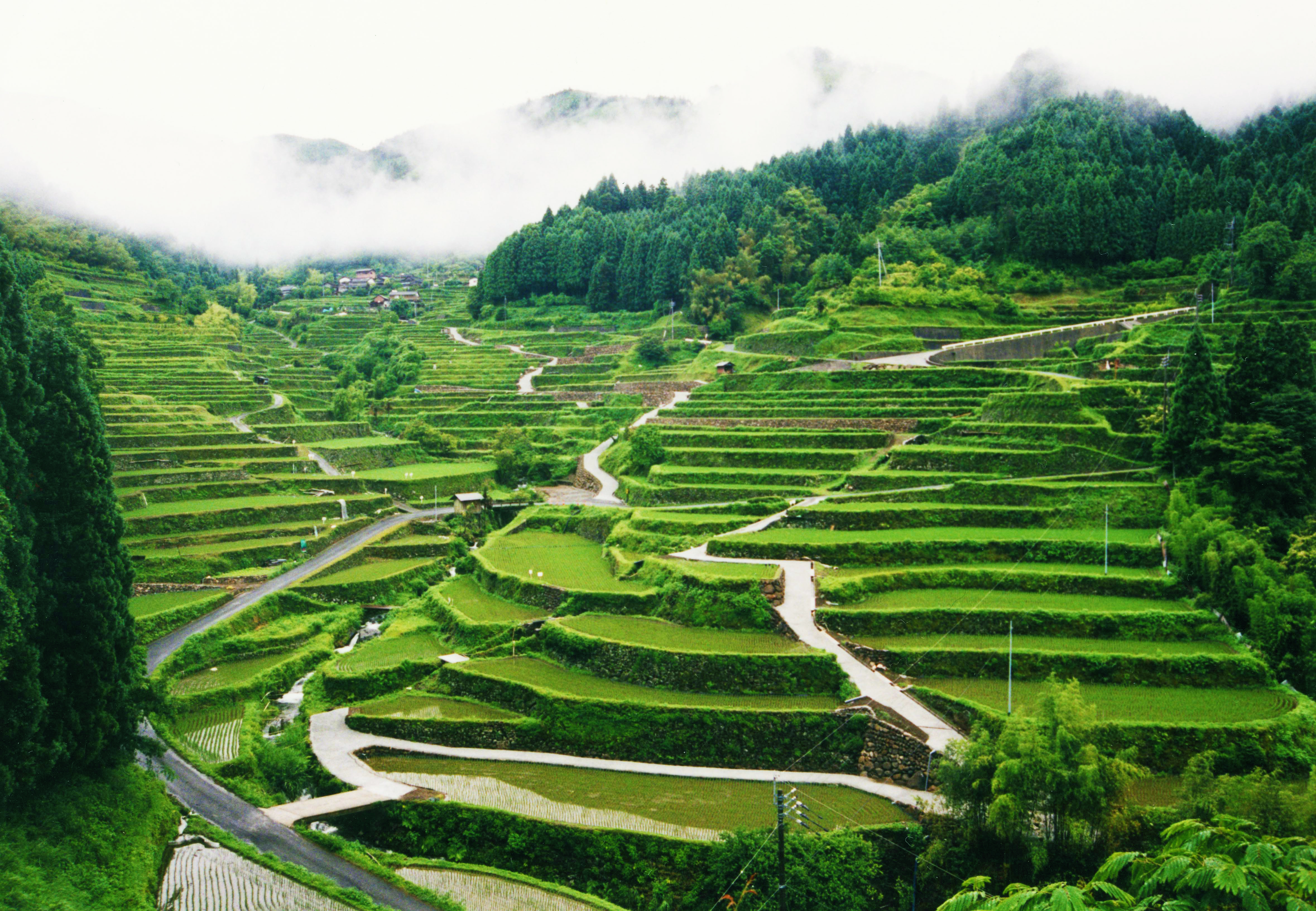
Rice terrace in the Fukuoka Prefecture, Japan.

A terrace in agriculture is a flat surface that has been cut into hills or mountains to provide areas for the cultivation for crops, as a method of more effective farming. Terrace agriculture or cultivation is when these platforms are created successively down the terrain in a pattern that resembles the steps of a staircase. As a type of landscaping, it is called terracing.

Terraced fields decrease both erosion and surface runoff, and may be used to support growing crops that require irrigation, such as rice. The Rice Terraces of the Philippine Cordilleras have been designated as a UNESCO World Heritage Site because of the significance of this technique.

== Uses ==
Farmers working on rice terraces (Indonesia)

Terraced paddy fields are used widely in rice, wheat and barley farming in east, south, southwest, and southeast Asia, as well as the Mediterranean Basin, Africa, and South America. Drier-climate terrace farming is common throughout the Mediterranean Basin, where they are used for vineyards, olive trees, cork oak, and other crops.

== Ancient history ==
The Yemen Highlands are known for their terrace systems which were constructed at the beginning of Bronze Age in the 3rd millennium BC. Similar early terrace systems have been documented in the Levant, where archaeological and geomorphological evidence supports terrace farming as early as the 4th millennium BCE, with widespread implementation in the Bronze and Iron Ages across arid environments such as the Negev Desert and Petra region.

Terracing is also used for sloping terrain; the Hanging Gardens of Babylon may have been built on an artificial mountain with stepped terraces, such as those on a ziggurat. At the seaside Villa of the Papyri in Herculaneum, the villa gardens of Julius Caesar's father-in-law were designed in terraces to give pleasant and varied views of the Bay of Naples.

Archaeological evidence from the Kislovodsk basin in the northern Caucasus indicates the use of terrace agriculture from the beginning of the first millennium BC, associated with the Koban culture, and continuing into the first millennium AD with later adaptations by Alanic communities. In the Mediterranean region, Optically Stimulated Luminescence (OSL) profiling and dating has revealed a major intensification of terrace construction during the later Middle Ages (c. AD 1100–1600), indicating a significant investment of labor in landscape modification during this period.

Intensive terrace farming is believed to have been practiced before the early 15th century AD in West Africa. Terraces were used by many groups, notably the Mafa, Ngas, Gwoza, and the Dogon.

== Recent history ==
It was long held that steep mountain landscapes are not conducive to, or do not even permit, agricultural mechanization. In the 1970s in the European Alps, pasture farms began mechanizing the management of alpine pastures and harvesting of forage grasses through use of single axle two-wheel tractors (2WTs) and very low center of gravity articulated steering 4-wheel tractors. Their designs by various European manufacturers were initially quite simple but effective, allowing them to cross slopes approaching 20%. In the 2000s new designs of wheels and tires, tracks, etc, and incorporation of electronics for better and safer control, allowed these machines to operate on slopes greater than 20% with various implements such as reaper-harvesters, rakes, balers, and transport trailers.

In Asian sub-tropical countries, a similar process has begun with the introduction of smaller, lower-tech and much lower-priced 2WTs in the 4-9 horsepower range that can be safely operated in the small, narrow terraces, and are light enough to be lifted and lowered from one terrace to the next. What is different from the Alpine use is that these 2WTs are being used for tillage and crop establishment of maize, wheat, and potato crops, and with their small 60-70cm-wide rotovators and special cage wheels are puddling the terraces for transplanted and broadcast rice. Farmers are also using the engines as stationary power sources for powering water pumps and threshers. Even more recently farmers are experimenting with use of small reaper-harvester attachments. In Nepal, the low costs of these mostly Chinese-made machines and the increased productivity they produce have meant that this scale-appropriate machinery is spreading across Nepal's Himalaya Mountains and likely into the other countries of the Himalaya and Hindu Kush.

In the town of Concord, Massachusetts USA, the Wayside property (then called Hillside) was transformed by Bronson Alcott in 1845 into a terraced property for gardens and agriculture, whose structure remains to this day.

== In specific areas ==
=== South America ===
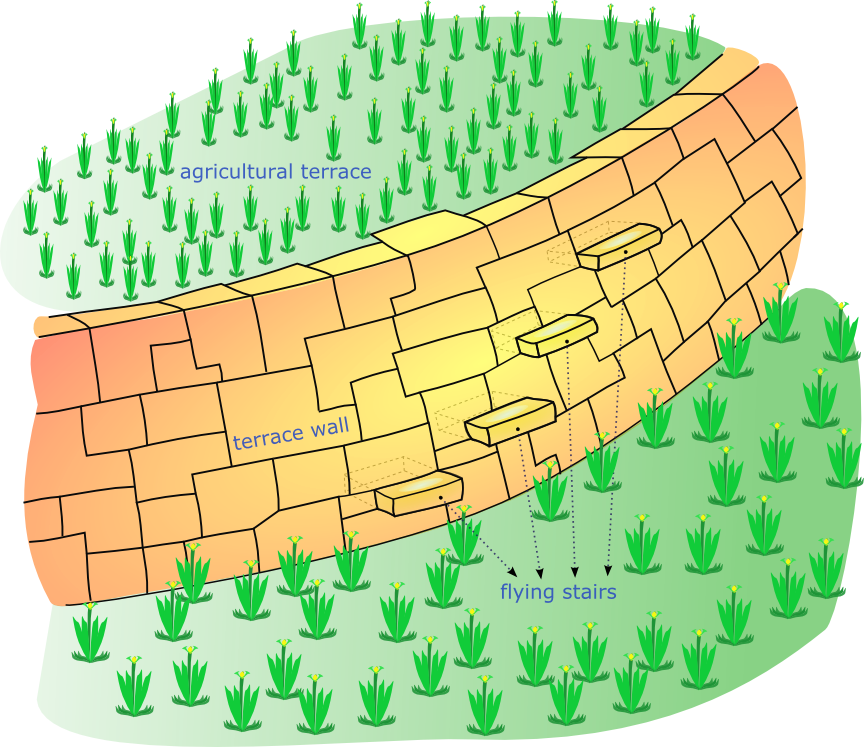
Diagram showing Inca terrace engineering for agriculture.

In the South American Andes, farmers have used terraces, known as andenes, for over a thousand years to farm potatoes, maize, and other native crops. Terraced farming was developed by the Wari culture and other peoples of the south-central Andes before 1000 AD, centuries before they were used by the Inca, who adopted them. The terraces were built to make the most efficient use of shallow soil and to enable irrigation of crops by allowing runoff to occur through the outlet.

The Inca people built on these, developing a system of canals, aqueducts, and puquios to direct water through dry land and increase fertility levels and growth. These terraced farms are found wherever mountain villages have existed in the Andes. They provided the food necessary to support the populations of great Inca cities and religious centres such as Machu Picchu.

=== Myanmar ===
In mountainous areas of Myanmar, terrace farming is known locally as the staircase or ladder farming (လှေခါးထစ်‌တောင်ယာ).

=== Japan ===
In Japan, some of the 100 Selected Terraced Rice Fields (in Japanese: 日本の棚田百選一覧), from Iwate in the north to Kagoshima in the south, are slowly disappearing, but volunteers are helping the farmers both to maintain their traditional methods and for sightseeing purposes.

=== Canary Islands ===
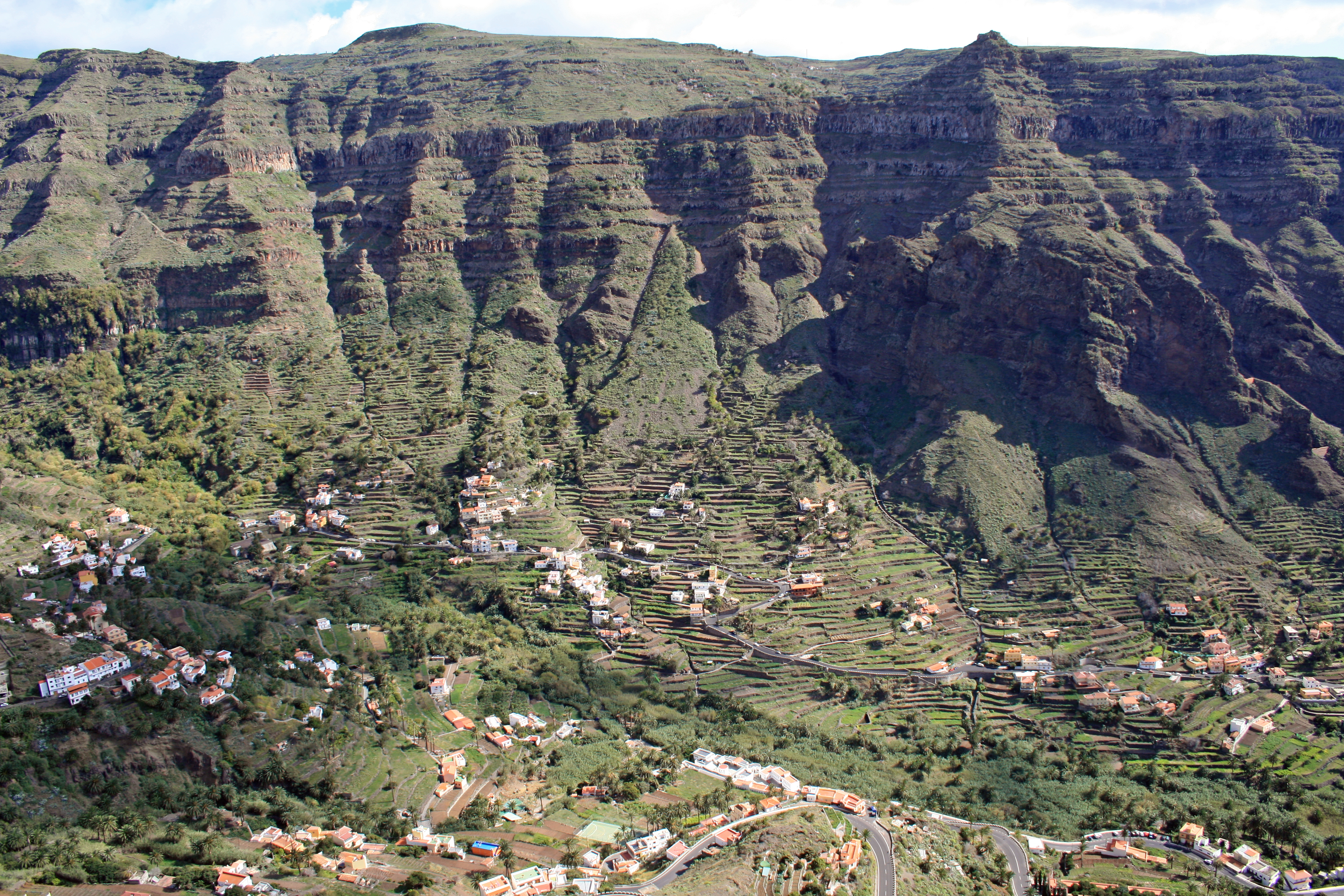
Terraced fields in La Gomera, Canary Islands

Terraced fields are common in islands with steep slopes. The Canary Islands present a complex system of terraces covering the landscape from the coastal irrigated plantations to the dry fields in the highlands. These terraces, which are named cadenas (chains), are built with stone walls of skillful design, which include attached stairs and channels.

=== England ===
In Old English, a terrace was also called a "lynch" (lynchet). An example of an ancient Lynch Mill is in Lyme Regis. The water is directed from a river by a duct along a terrace. This set-up was used in steep hilly areas in the UK.

=== Israel ===
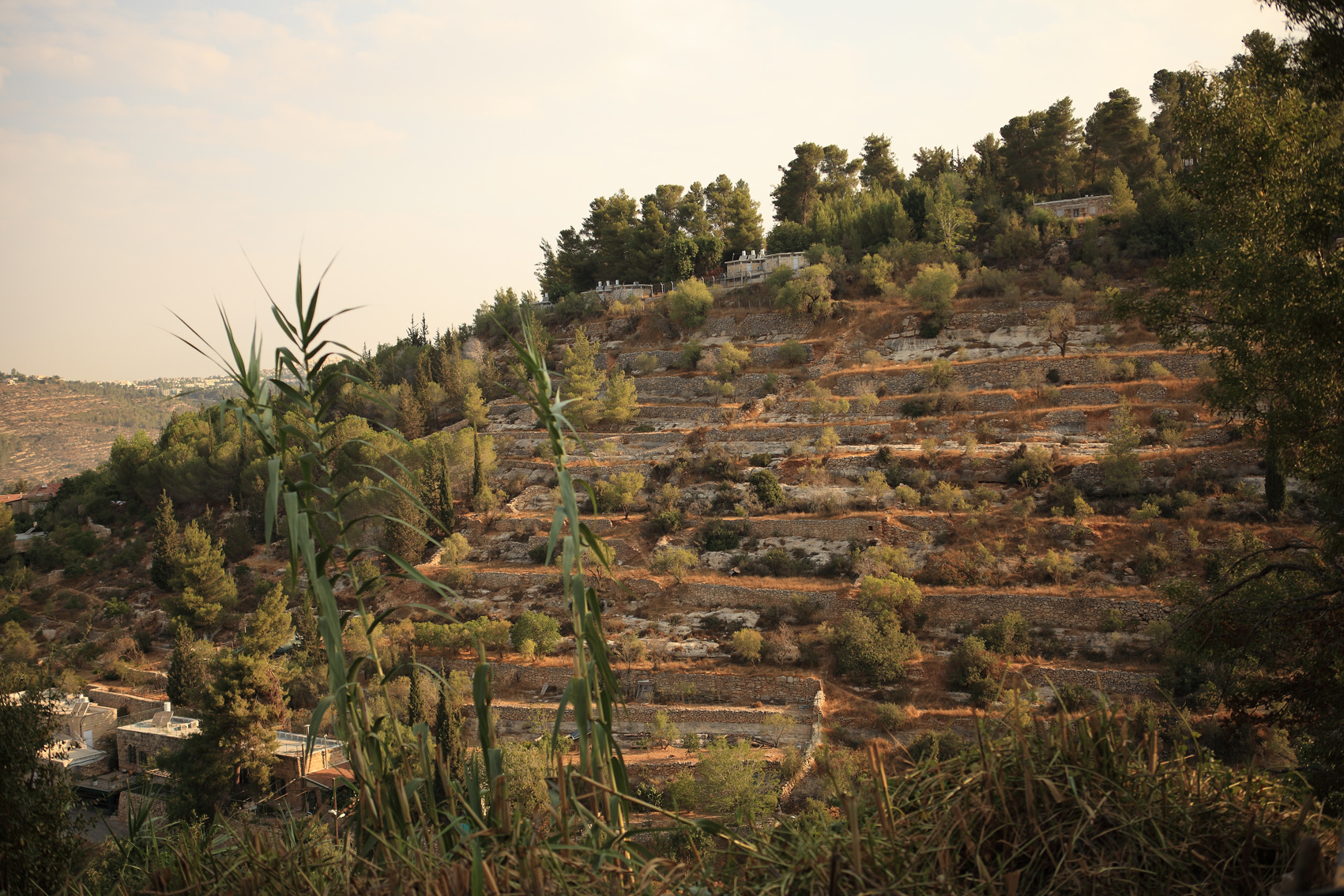
Terraces near Ein Karem, Israel

Ancient terraces are a common feature in the Jerusalem Mountains, often found in conjunction with ancient rock-cut agricultural structures including quarries, winepresses, olive oil presses, water holes, lime kilns, roads, and agricultural watchtowers. According to Zvi Ron's estimation, these terraces encompass approximately 56% of the open grounds in the area.

Despite their prevalence, there is a lack of consensus among scholars regarding their construction date. Various theories have been proposed, with Zvi Ron suggesting that their origins date back to ancient times, Finkelstein proposing the Middle Bronze Age, and Feig, Stager, and Harel suggesting the Iron Age. Archaeologists Gibson and Edelstein conducted research on terrace systems in the Rephaim valley, proposing that the ones in Khirbet er-Ras were built during the Iron Age II, whereas those in Ein Yael were linked to the Second Temple and Roman periods. Seligman suggested that while some terraces were established in ancient times, the majority of them are more likely to have originated during the Roman and Byzantine periods. A 2014 research study on terraces near Ramat Rachel, using Optically Stimulated Luminescence (OSL), yielded dates ranging from the Hellenistic period to Mamluk and Ottoman times. The majority of the samples fell within the latter periods. However, the study's ability to precisely determine the original construction date remains uncertain, as the results could also reflect subsequent agricultural modifications that affected exposure to sunlight.

== Gallery ==
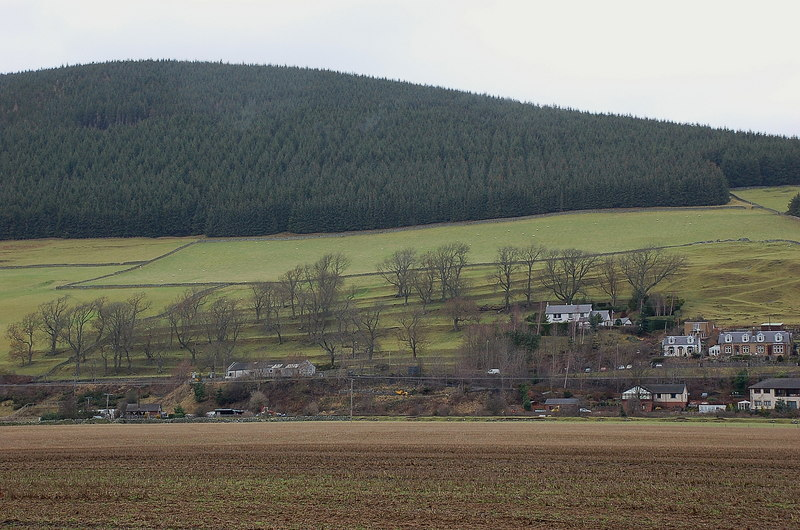
Cultivation terraces, Walkerburn

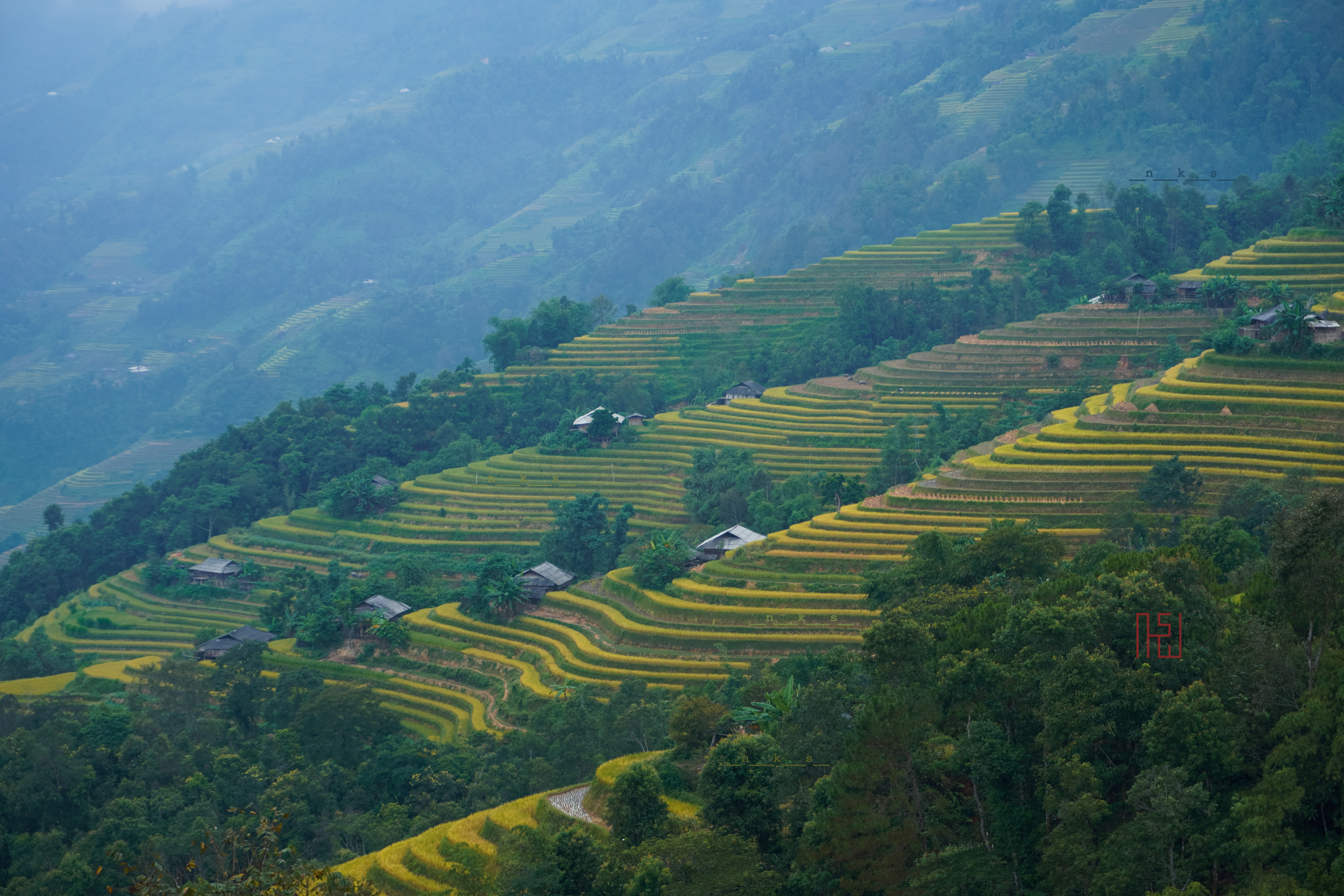
Rice terraces in Hoang Su Phi, Ha Giang, Vietnam.

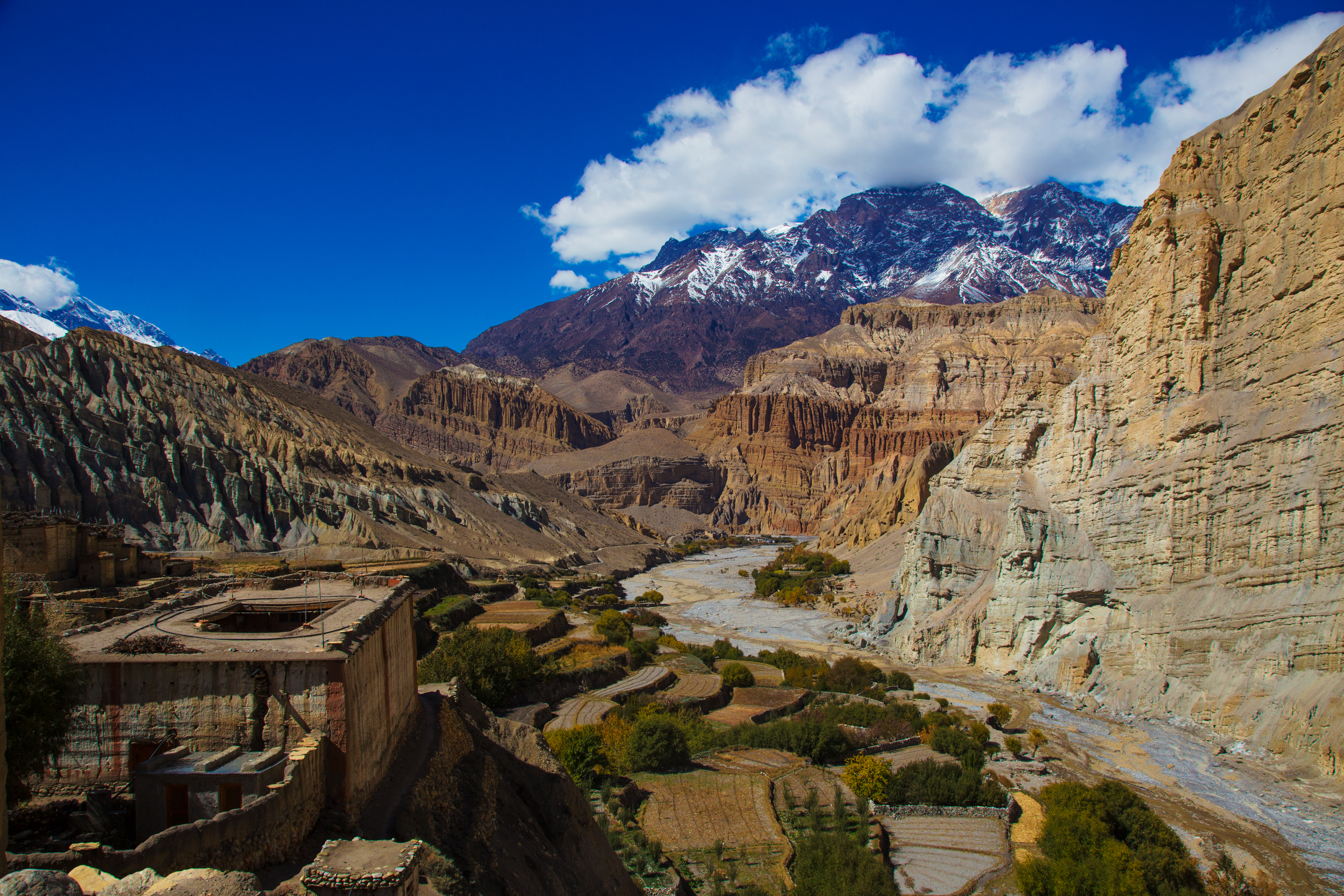
Tetang Village terraced fields, Mustang District

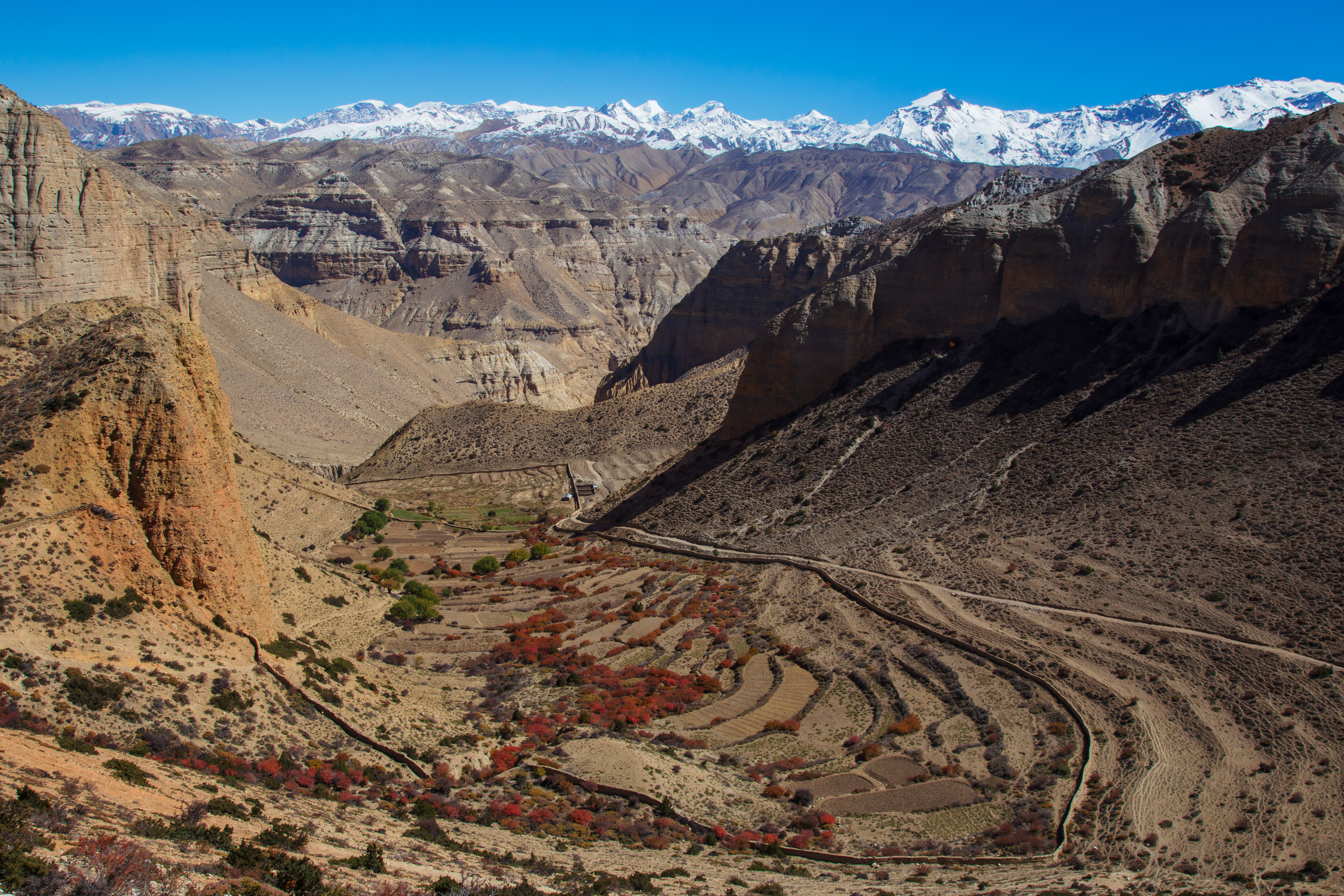
Terraced fields in the Upper Mustang region of Nepal

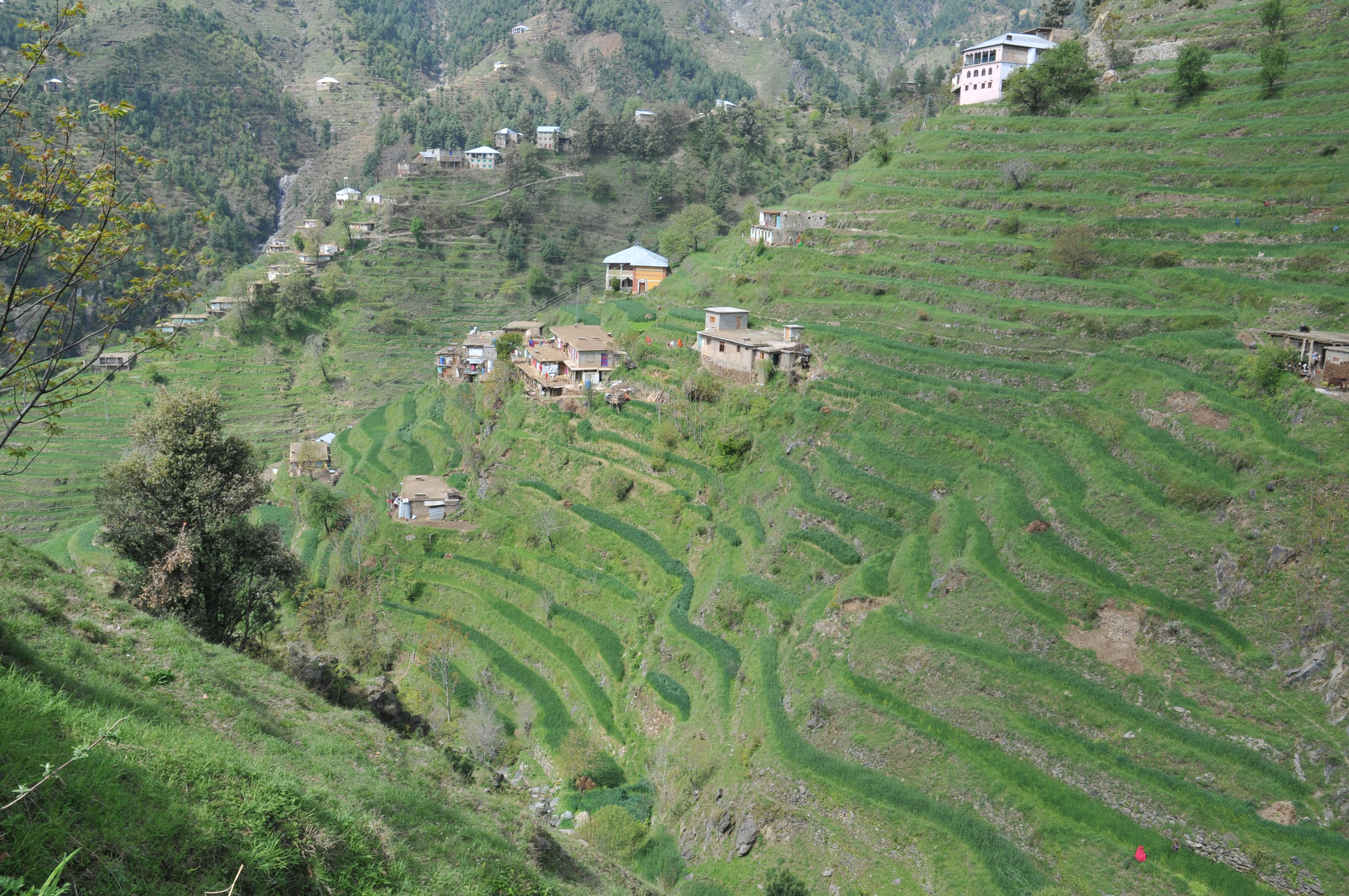
Terraced field in Kabal Swat valley, Pakistan.

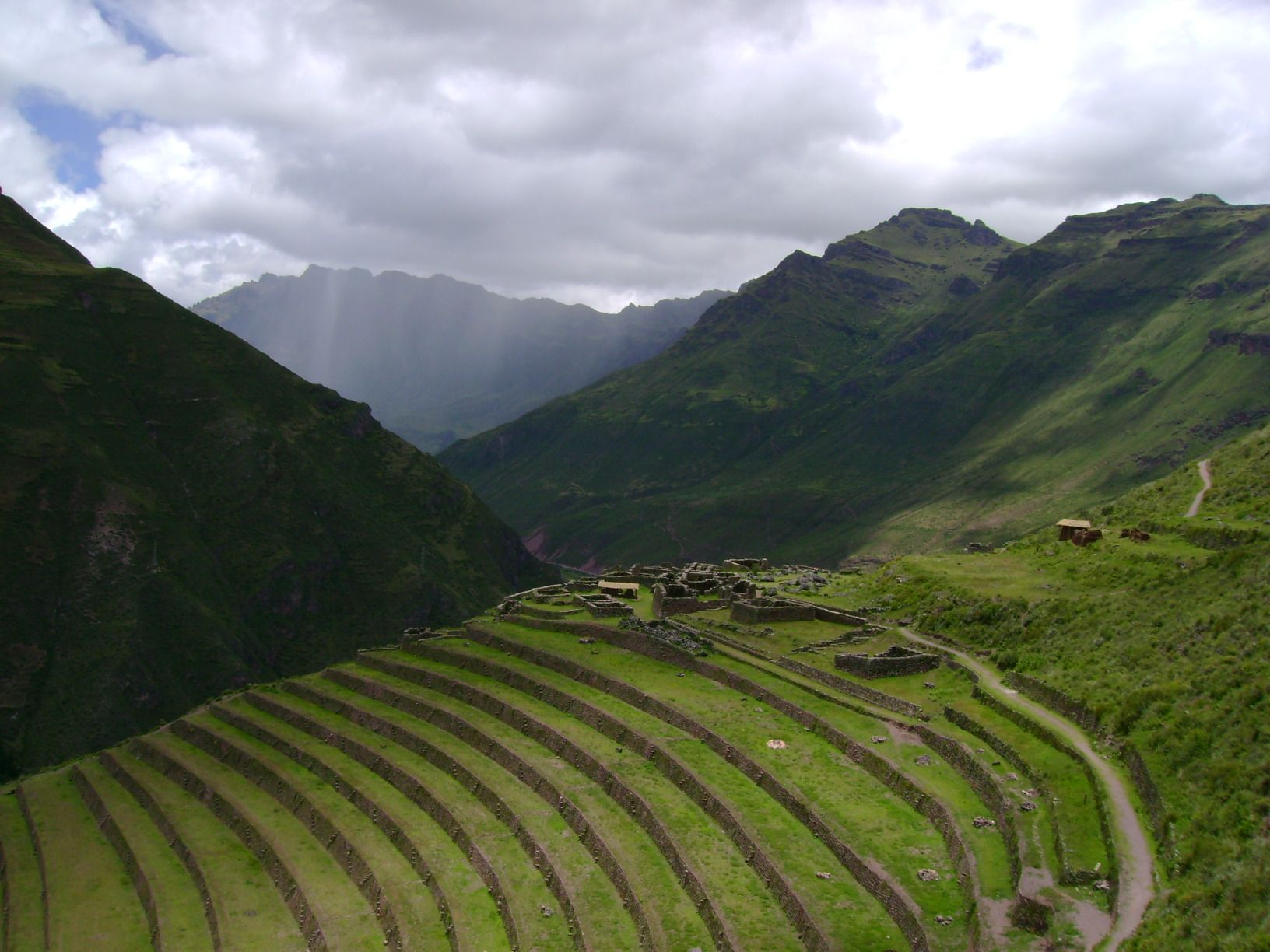
Terraced farmland in Peru, adopted by the Inca.

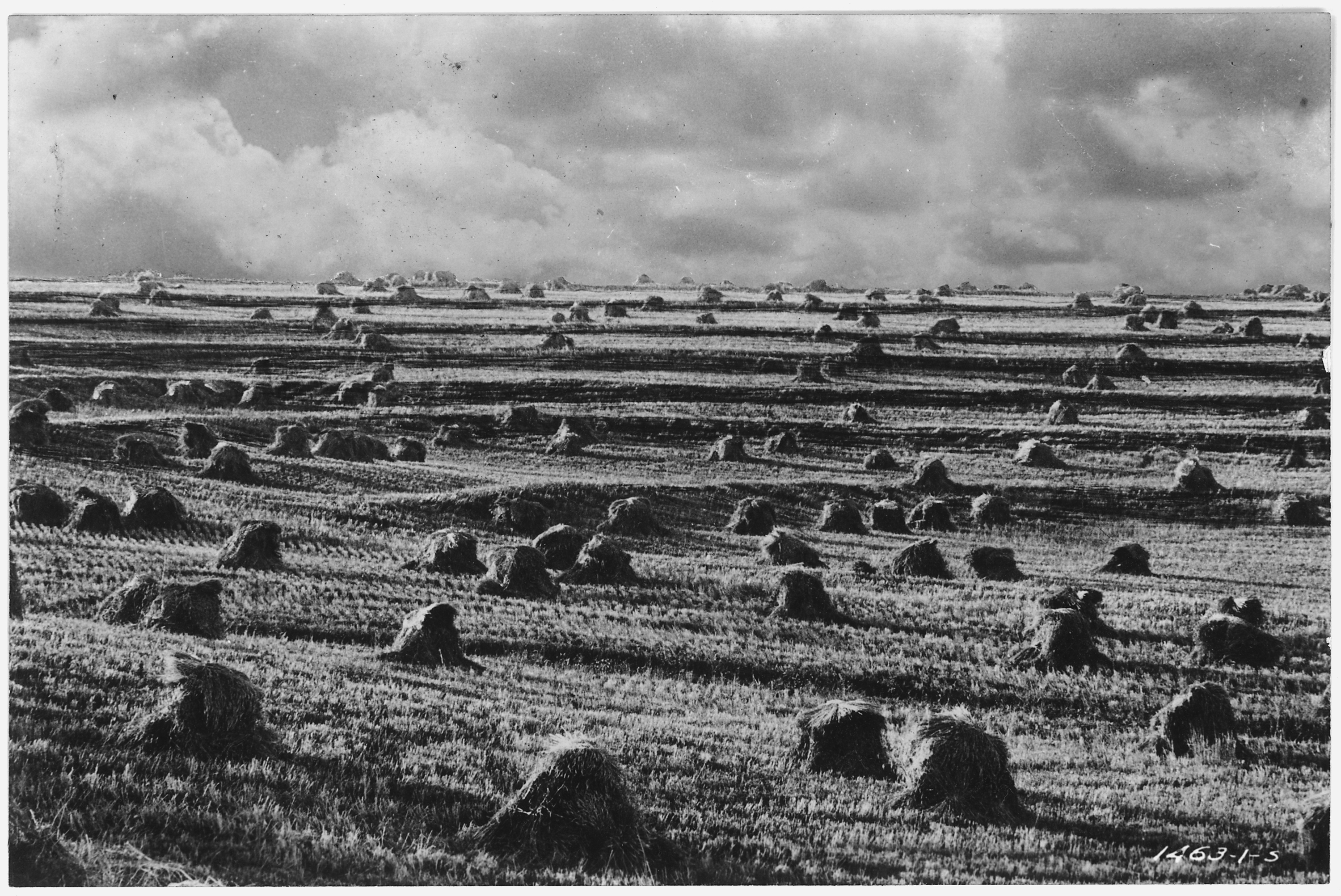
Terraced hay fields in the Upper Mississippi River basin during the 1930s.

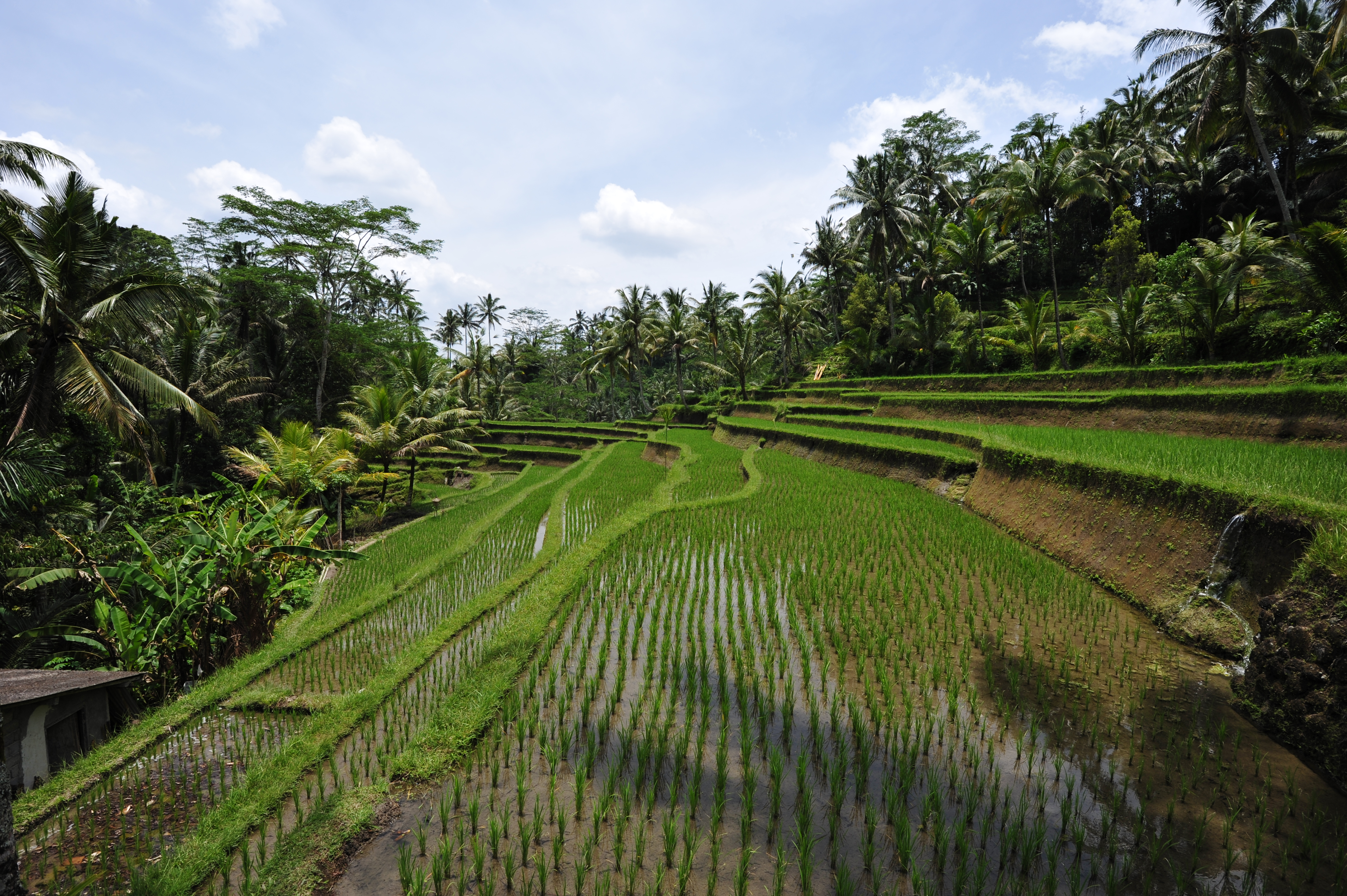
Rice terrace in Bali

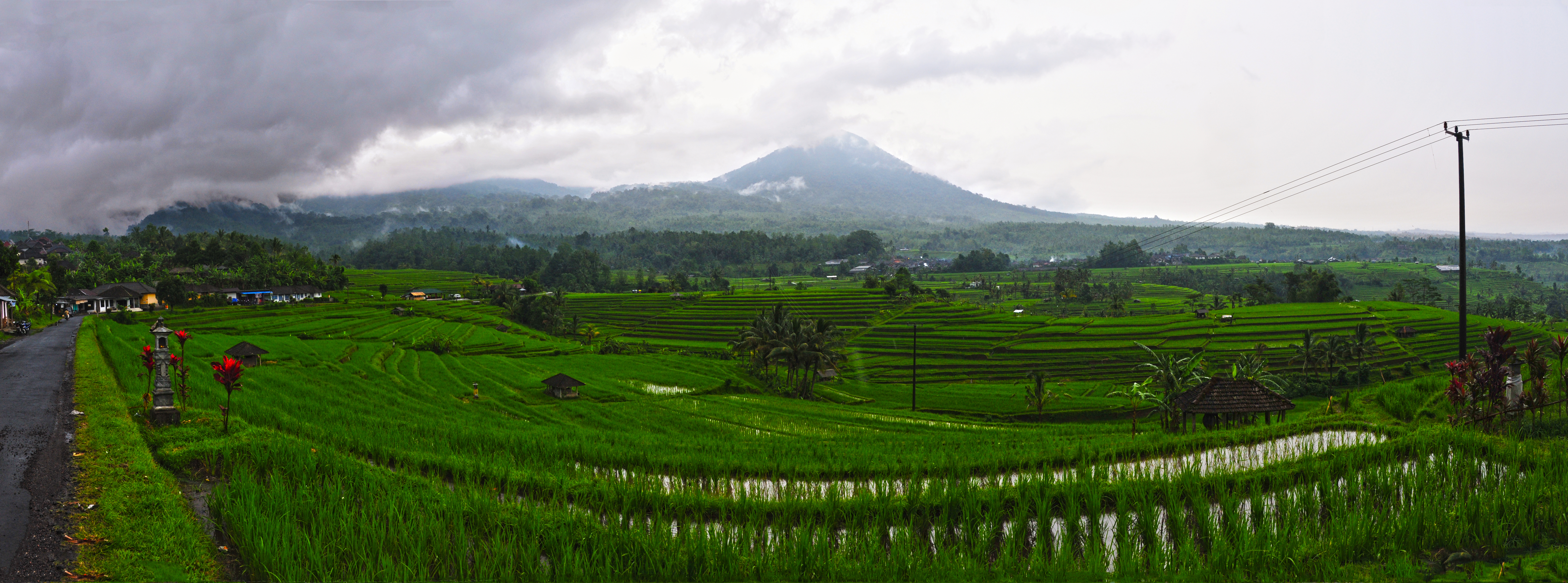
Jatiluwih rice terrace in Bali, Indonesia.

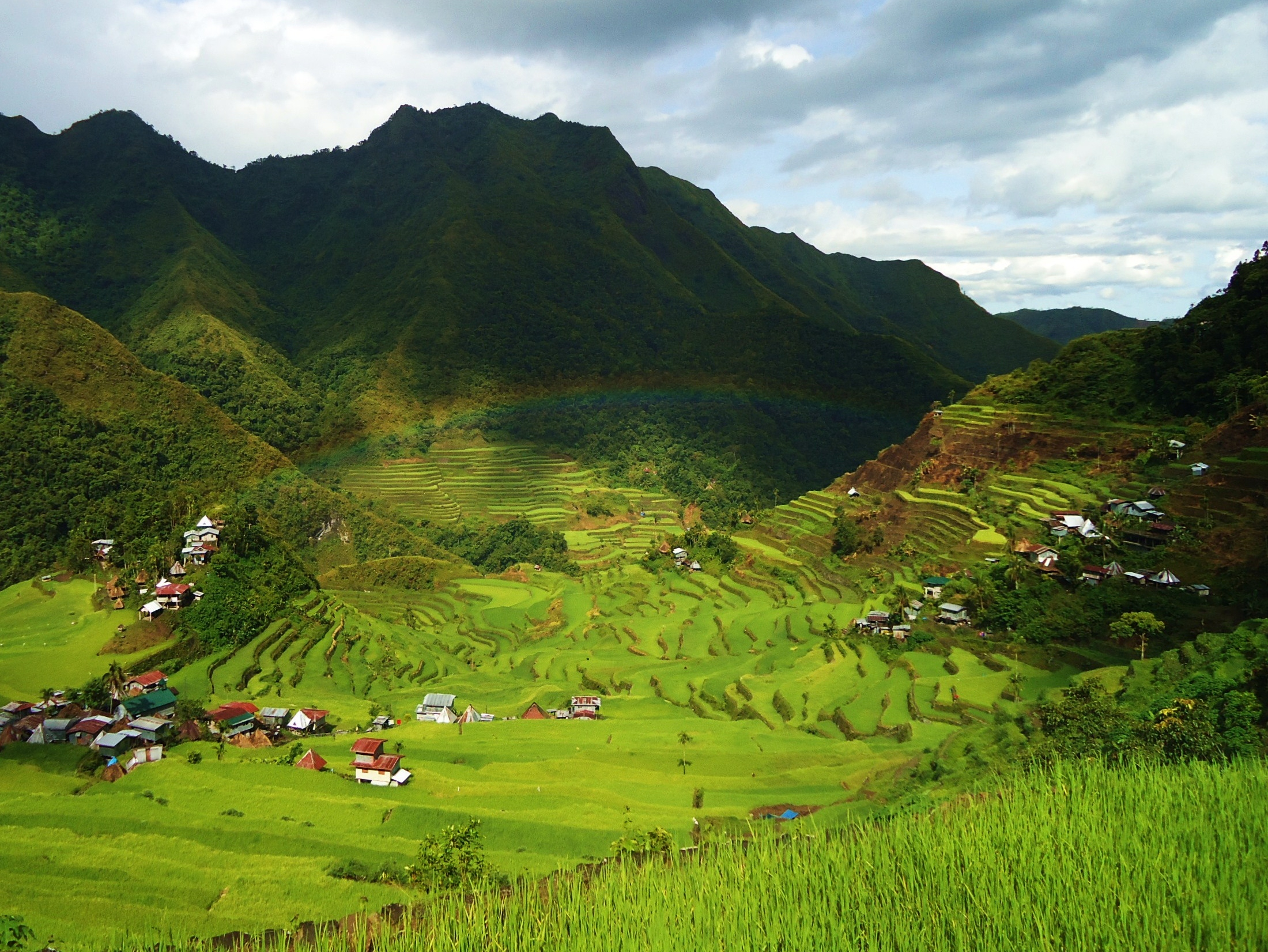
The Batad Rice Terraces in Ifugao, Philippines.

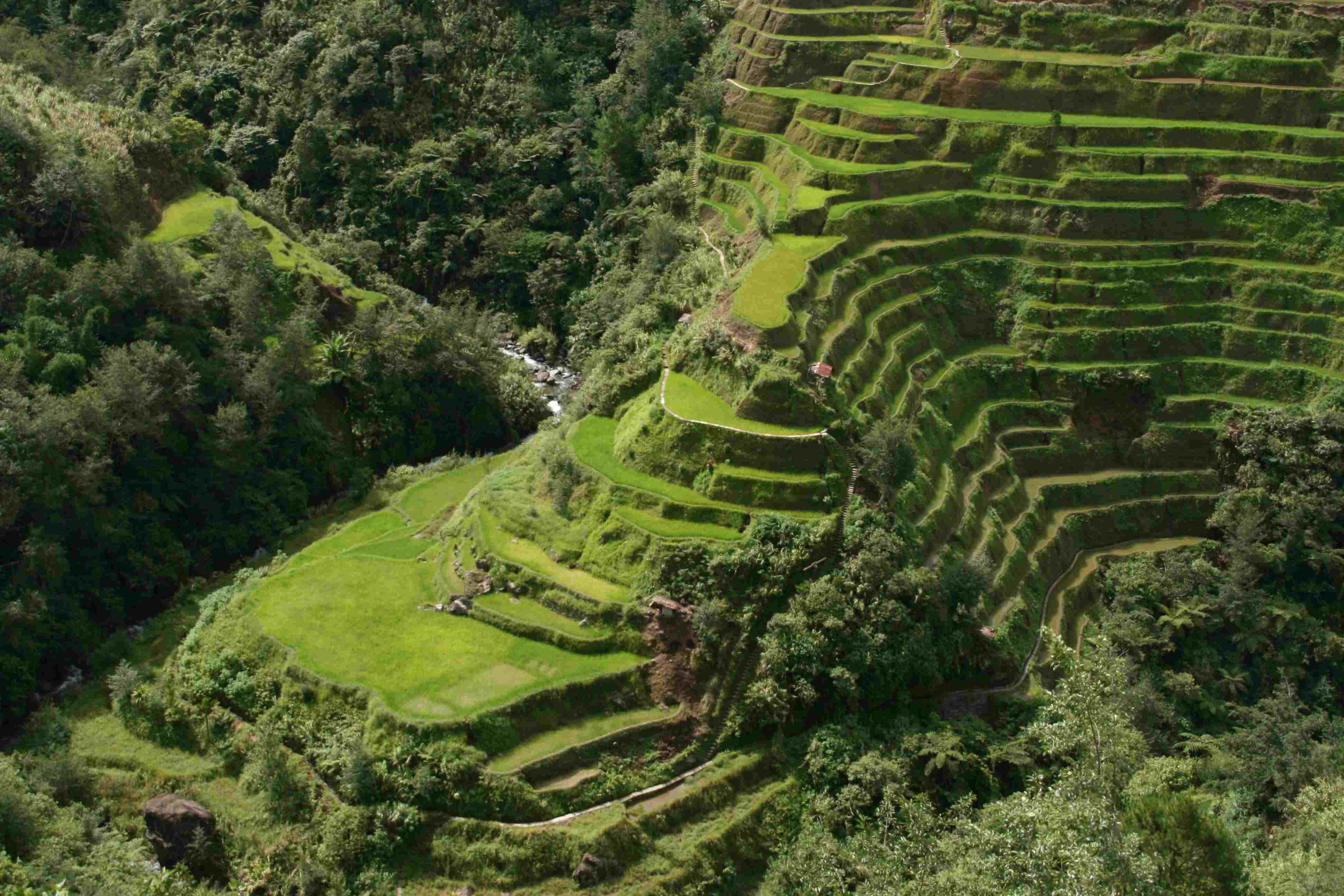
The Banaue Rice Terraces in Ifugao, Philippines.

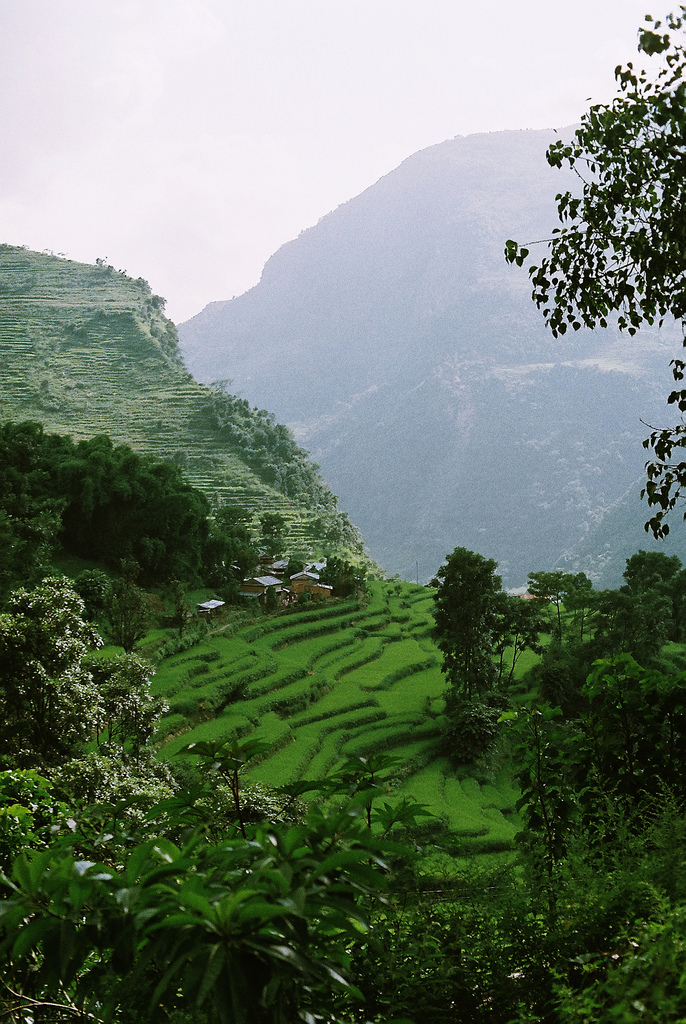
Rice cultivation, Lower Himalayas, Nepal.

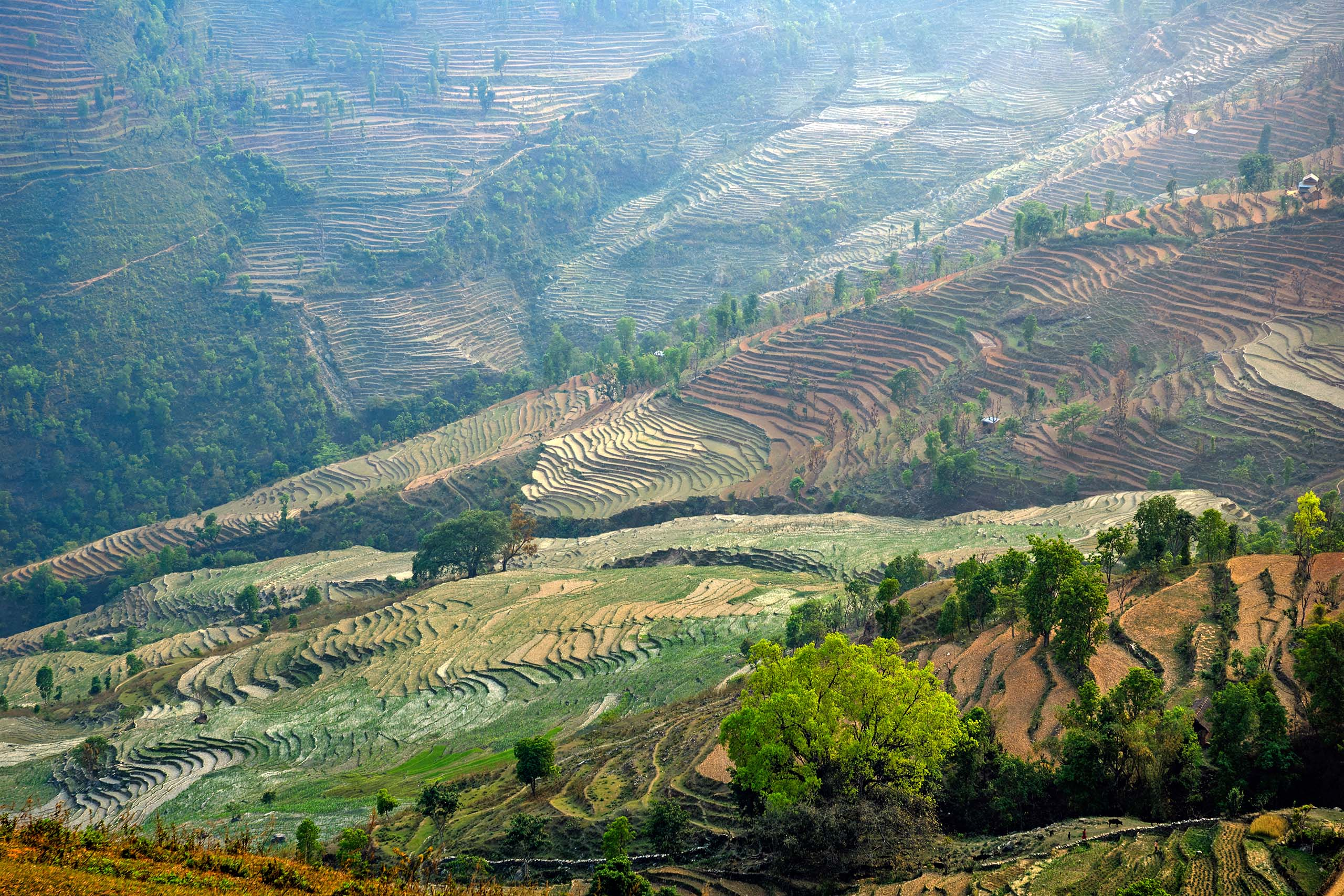
Terraced agricultural landscape with hundreds of terraces on the hills of Dhading, Nepal

== See also ==
- Anden
- Honghe Hani Rice Terraces
  - Yuanyang County, Yunnan
- Banaue Rice Terraces
- Rice Terraces of the Philippine Cordilleras
- Satoyama
- Terrace garden
- Terraced wall
- Lynchet
