= List of pillars of Wyoming =

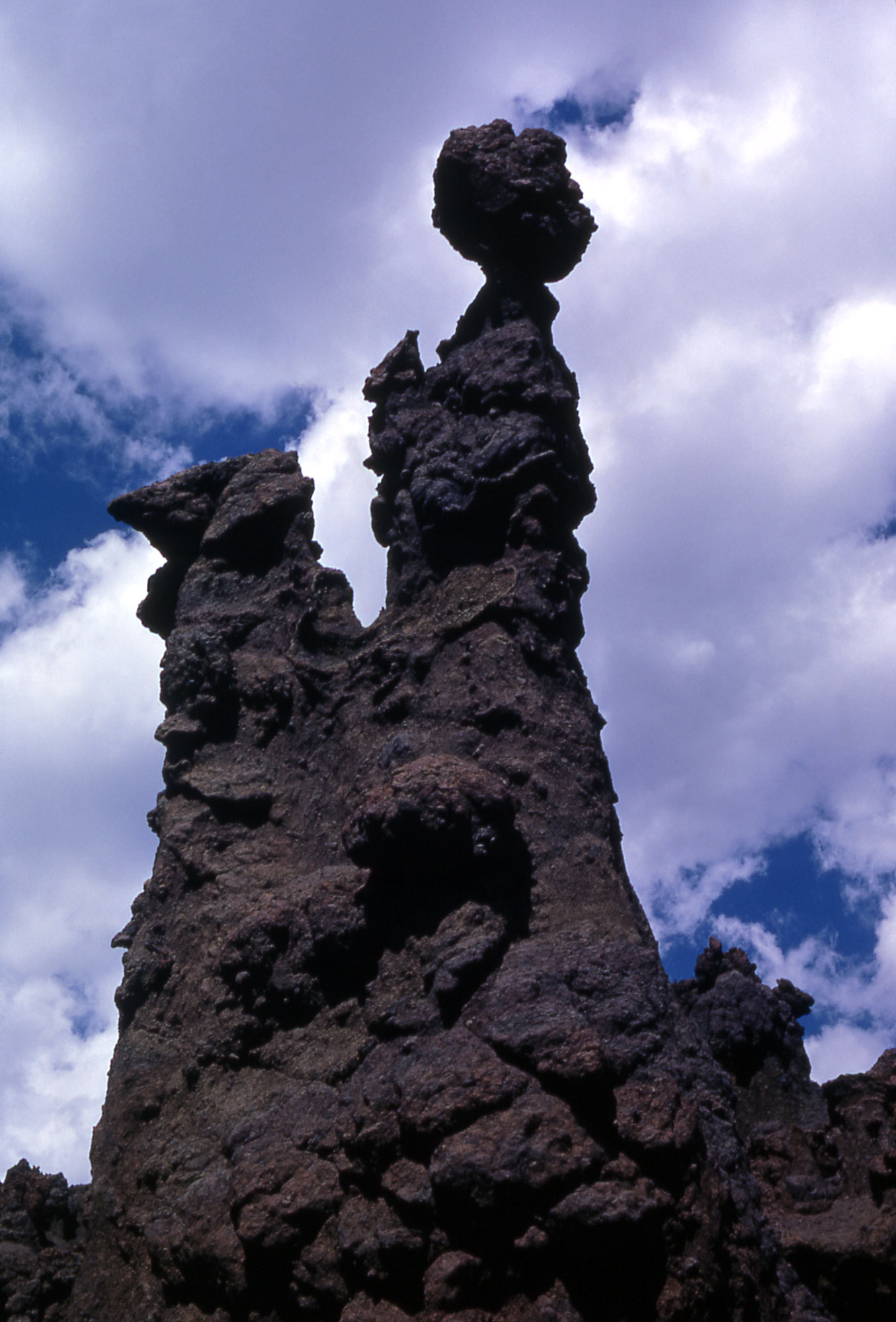
Hoodoos, Yellowstone National Park

There are least 79 named Pillars in Wyoming according to the U.S. Geological Survey, U.S. Board of Geological Names. A Pillar is defined as a "vertical, standing, often spire-shaped, natural rock formation (chimney, monument, pinnacle, pohaku, rock tower)". The Oxford Dictionary of Geography defines Earth Pillar as "an upstanding, free column of soil that has been sheltered from erosion by a natural cap of stone on the top". They are common where boulder-rich moraines have been subject to gully erosion, as in parts of the southern Tyrol.

- Ames Monument, Albany County, Wyoming, 41°07′50″N 105°23′53″W, el. 8,274 feet (2,522 m)
- Anvil Rock, Park County, Wyoming, 44°28′02″N 109°33′59″W, el. 6,660 feet (2,030 m)
- Batchelder Column, Teton County, Wyoming, 44°16′43″N 110°54′14″W, el. 7,336 feet (2,236 m)
- Block Tower, Fremont County, Wyoming, 42°46′31″N 109°14′12″W, el. 12,188 feet (3,715 m)
- Bosin Rock, Sheridan County, Wyoming, 44°37′24″N 107°07′06″W, el. 7,716 feet (2,352 m)
- Camel Rock, Park County, Wyoming, 44°27′27″N 109°33′18″W, el. 6,253 feet (1,906 m)
- Castle Rock, Sweetwater County, Wyoming, 41°32′02″N 109°28′04″W, el. 6,614 feet (2,016 m)
- Castle Rock, Niobrara County, Wyoming, 43°00′48″N 104°24′14″W, el. 4,370 feet (1,330 m)
- Castle Rock, Johnson County, Wyoming, 43°37′50″N 106°43′42″W, el. 5,351 feet (1,631 m)
- Castle Rock, Fremont County, Wyoming, 43°43′37″N 109°23′57″W, el. 11,037 feet (3,364 m)
- Castle Rocks, Hot Springs County, Wyoming, 43°45′03″N 109°02′39″W, el. 9,399 feet (2,865 m)
- Chimney Rock, Platte County, Wyoming, 41°51′21″N 104°48′38″W, el. 5,262 feet (1,604 m)
- Chimney Rock, Fremont County, Wyoming, 42°52′28″N 107°57′02″W, el. 5,751 feet (1,753 m)
- Chimney Rock, Park County, Wyoming, 44°27′14″N 109°48′44″W, el. 6,368 feet (1,941 m)
- Chimney Rock, Fremont County, Wyoming, 42°42′39″N 109°07′00″W, el. 12,661 feet (3,859 m)
- Chimney Rock, Fremont County, Wyoming, 43°10′40″N 109°35′23″W, el. 13,061 feet (3,981 m)
- Chimney Rock, Big Horn County, Wyoming, 44°30′50″N 107°43′55″W, el. 4,593 feet (1,400 m)
- Chimney Rock, Big Horn County, Wyoming, 44°32′57″N 107°43′41″W, el. 4,583 feet (1,397 m)
- Devils Monument, Natrona County, Wyoming, 43°27′10″N 106°34′58″W, el. 5,341 feet (1,628 m)
- Dome Rock, Sheridan County, Wyoming, 44°36′02″N 107°16′22″W, el. 9,190 feet (2,800 m)
- Duck Rock, Park County, Wyoming, 44°42′37″N 110°44′27″W, el. 7,365 feet (2,245 m)
- Eagle Rock, Sweetwater County, Wyoming, 41°32′02″N 109°28′04″W, el. 6,614 feet (2,016 m)
- Eagle Rock, Big Horn County, Wyoming, 44°39′35″N 107°53′58″W, el. 4,816 feet (1,468 m)
- Eagle Rock, Albany County, Wyoming, 41°16′56″N 105°21′47″W, el. 8,215 feet (2,504 m)
- Elephant Head Rock, Park County, Wyoming, 44°27′39″N 109°48′25″W, el. 7,001 feet (2,134 m)
- Finger Rock, Johnson County, Wyoming, 44°33′04″N 107°11′34″W, el. 8,756 feet (2,669 m)
- Frank N Hammitt Monument, Park County, Wyoming, 44°47′45″N 109°26′36″W, el. 6,604 feet (2,013 m)
- French Rocks, Natrona County, Wyoming, 42°50′17″N 107°22′53″W, el. 7,920 feet (2,410 m)
- Giants Thumb, Sweetwater County, Wyoming, 41°32′36″N 109°28′25″W, el. 6,407 feet (1,953 m)
- Glen Rock, Converse County, Wyoming, 42°51′36″N 105°53′05″W, el. 5,079 feet (1,548 m)
- Goose Rock, Park County, Wyoming, 44°27′47″N 109°34′08″W, el. 6,063 feet (1,848 m)
- Gooseneck Pinnacle, Fremont County, Wyoming, 43°10′47″N 109°39′05″W, el. 13,008 feet (3,965 m)
- Gray Rocks, Albany County, Wyoming, 42°25′35″N 105°26′46″W, el. 6,713 feet (2,046 m)
- Hanging Rock, Park County, Wyoming, 44°27′32″N 109°33′36″W, el. 6,211 feet (1,893 m)
- Hat Rock, Niobrara County, Wyoming, 42°54′29″N 104°24′31″W, el. 4,947 feet (1,508 m)
- Henry Ford Rock, Park County, Wyoming, 44°27′19″N 109°46′28″W, el. 6,443 feet (1,964 m)
- Horse Tooth, Platte County, Wyoming, 42°31′19″N 104°49′03″W, el. 5,433 feet (1,656 m)
- Ice Point, Teton County, Wyoming, 43°46′12″N 110°46′00″W, el. 9,836 feet (2,998 m)
- Lamburger Rock, Sheridan County, Wyoming, 44°34′33″N 107°09′48″W, el. 7,880 feet (2,400 m)
- Laughing Pig Rock, Park County, Wyoming, 44°27′32″N 109°32′26″W, el. 6,250 feet (1,900 m)
- Leigh Monument, Washakie County, Wyoming, 44°05′06″N 107°18′15″W, el. 6,381 feet (1,945 m)
- Little Monument, Sweetwater County, Wyoming, 42°09′48″N 110°01′46″W, el. 7,027 feet (2,142 m)
- Monumental City, Crook County, Wyoming, 44°24′47″N 104°49′18″W, el. 4,249 feet (1,295 m)
- Neil Bell Monument, Natrona County, Wyoming, 42°51′14″N 107°09′49″W, el. 6,224 feet (1,897 m)
- Ninemile Rock, Goshen County, Wyoming, 41°35′14″N 104°04′02″W, el. 4,787 feet (1,459 m)
- North Chimney Rock, Sweetwater County, Wyoming, 41°22′06″N 109°25′13″W, el. 6,916 feet (2,108 m)
- Old Woman Cabin Rock, Park County, Wyoming, 44°27′59″N 109°34′27″W, el. 6,391 feet (1,948 m)
- Overhanging Tower, Sublette County, Wyoming, 42°46′41″N 109°14′12″W, el. 12,096 feet (3,687 m)
- Pinnacle Rocks, Niobrara County, Wyoming, 43°21′55″N 104°53′41″W, el. 4,701 feet (1,433 m)
- Preacher Rock, Sheridan County, Wyoming, 44°36′39″N 107°15′50″W, el. 8,248 feet (2,514 m)
- Red Bill Point, Goshen County, Wyoming, 41°54′57″N 104°26′33″W, el. 4,432 feet (1,351 m)
- Red Monument, Carbon County, Wyoming, 41°06′22″N 107°36′14″W, el. 6,778 feet (2,066 m)
- Red Rock, Park County, Wyoming, 44°43′15″N 110°29′33″W, el. 7,785 feet (2,373 m)
- Rock of Ages, Teton County, Wyoming, 43°46′27″N 110°46′43″W, el. 10,892 feet (3,320 m)
- Ship Rock, Niobrara County, Wyoming, 42°54′15″N 104°24′16″W, el. 4,895 feet (1,492 m)
- Slick Rock, Converse County, Wyoming, 42°27′49″N 105°31′08″W, el. 6,932 feet (2,113 m)
- Slipper Rock, Park County, Wyoming, 44°27′57″N 109°34′23″W, el. 6,375 feet (1,943 m)
- South Chimney Rock, Sweetwater County, Wyoming, 41°21′18″N 109°25′38″W, el. 6,742 feet (2,055 m)
- Steamboat Rock, Goshen County, Wyoming, 41°47′25″N 104°29′43″W, el. 5,177 feet (1,578 m)
- Steamboat Rock, Niobrara County, Wyoming, 42°43′51″N 104°07′13″W, el. 5,043 feet (1,537 m)
- Steamship Rock, Big Horn County, Wyoming, 44°36′56″N 108°02′49″W, el. 4,058 feet (1,237 m)
- Storm Point, Teton County, Wyoming, 43°46′07″N 110°45′59″W, el. 10,010 feet (3,050 m)
- Sugar Bowl Rock, Sweetwater County, Wyoming, 41°32′34″N 109°28′19″W, el. 6,407 feet (1,953 m)
- Symmetry Spire, Teton County, Wyoming, 43°46′25″N 110°45′56″W, el. 10,548 feet (3,215 m)
- Teakettle Rock, Sweetwater County, Wyoming, 41°32′31″N 109°28′22″W, el. 6,407 feet (1,953 m)
- Teepe Pillar, Teton County, Wyoming, 43°44′09″N 110°48′04″W, el. 12,070 feet (3,680 m)
- The Chimney, Johnson County, Wyoming, 43°39′29″N 106°21′07″W, el. 4,442 feet (1,354 m)
- The Holy City, Hot Springs County, Wyoming, 43°45′46″N 108°58′53″W, el. 8,310 feet (2,530 m)
- The Hoodoos, Park County, Wyoming, 44°56′44″N 110°43′08″W, el. 7,132 feet (2,174 m)
- The Needle, Park County, Wyoming, 44°54′00″N 110°24′03″W, el. 6,713 feet (2,046 m)
- The Open Door, Teton County, Wyoming, 43°22′05″N 110°25′57″W, el. 9,029 feet (2,752 m)
- The Pinnacles, Sweetwater County, Wyoming, 42°03′51″N 108°42′29″W, el. 7,027 feet (2,142 m)
- The Reefs, Natrona County, Wyoming, 42°57′59″N 106°20′18″W, el. 5,348 feet (1,630 m)
- Tie Hack Historical Monument, Fremont County, Wyoming, 43°38′48″N 109°55′35″W, el. 7,766 feet (2,367 m)
- Tollgate Rock, Sweetwater County, Wyoming, 41°32′41″N 109°28′57″W, el. 6,447 feet (1,965 m)
- Twin Rocks, Sweetwater County, Wyoming, 41°48′34″N 109°07′16″W, el. 6,962 feet (2,122 m)
- Wags Pinnacle, Campbell County, Wyoming, 43°56′42″N 105°47′30″W, el. 5,174 feet (1,577 m)
- Washakie Needles, Hot Springs County, Wyoming, 43°44′51″N 109°12′03″W, el. 12,198 feet (3,718 m)
- Watch Tower, Fremont County, Wyoming, 42°46′27″N 109°14′04″W, el. 12,260 feet (3,740 m)
