= Bollinger Peak =

Mountain summit in Wyoming, USA

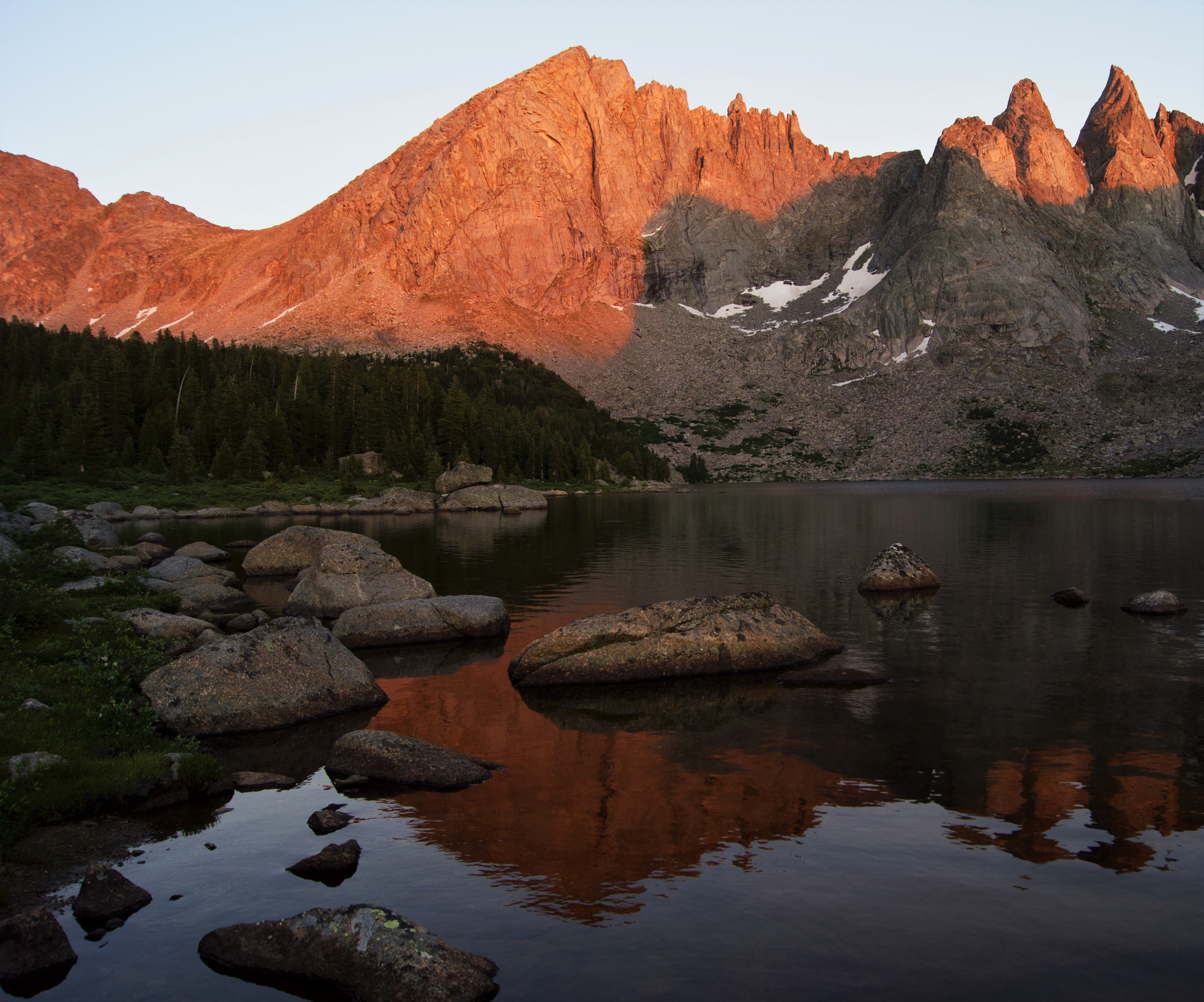
- West aspect, from Shadow Lake at sunset

Highest point
- Elevation: 12,232 ft (3,728 m)
- Prominence: 472 ft (144 m)
- Parent peak: Pylon Peak (12,383 ft)
- Isolation: 1.01 mi (1.63 km)
- Coordinates: 42°46′58″N 109°13′58″W

Geography
- Location within Wyoming Location within the United States
- Location: Sublette County / Fremont County; Wyoming, U.S.
- Parent range: Wind River Range; Rocky Mountains
- Topo map: USGS Lizard Head Peak

Geology
- Rock type: granitic

Climbing
- Easiest route: class 3 Northeast ridge

Bollinger Peak is a 12,232-foot-elevation (3,728-meter) mountain summit located on the shared border of Sublette County and Fremont County in the state of Wyoming, United States.

== Description ==
The peak is situated in the remote Wind River Range, on the Continental Divide, in the renowned Cirque of the Towers. It is set on the common boundary Popo Agie Wilderness shares with the Bridger Wilderness, on land managed by Bridger-Teton National Forest and Shoshone National Forest. Bollinger ranks as the 148th-highest peak in Wyoming, and topographic relief is significant as the west aspect rises 2,000 feet (610 meters) above Shadow Lake in one-half mile. Nearby geographic features include Wolfs Head, 0.16 mile to the south, Sharks Nose one-half mile south, and Pingora Peak 0.44 miles to the southeast. The peak's unofficial name commemorates Karl Bollinger who perished August 11, 1953, from a leader fall on nearby War Bonnet Peak, the day after he climbed this namesake peak. His name has also been reported as Karl Bollinger Jr., and Kent Bollinger.

== Climbing ==
The northeast ridge was first climbed in 1941 by Norman Clyde, Edith and J. Holliday, and B. Pitcher. Other established routes include the West Face by Steven French and Matt Parramore in 1981, and the West Pillar (IV 5.10).

== Climate ==
According to the Köppen climate classification system, Bollinger Peak is located in an alpine subarctic climate zone with long, cold, snowy winters, and cool to warm summers. Due to its altitude, it receives precipitation all year, as snow in winter, and as thunderstorms in summer. Precipitation runoff from the mountain's west side drains to the Green River via Washakie Creek, and the east side drains into Lonesome Lake, thence North Fork Popo Agie River.

== Hazards ==
Encountering bears is a concern in the Wind River Range. There are other concerns as well, including bugs, wildfires, adverse snow conditions and nighttime cold temperatures.

Importantly, there have been notable incidents, including accidental deaths, due to falls from steep cliffs (a misstep could be fatal in this class 4/5 terrain) and due to falling rocks, over the years, including 1993, 2007 (involving an experienced NOLS leader), 2015, and 2018. A 54-year-old climber fell 400–800 feet to his death from Steeple Peak in 2017. Other incidents include a seriously injured backpacker being airlifted near Squaretop Mountain in 2005, and a fatal hiker incident (from an apparent accidental fall) in 2006 that involved state search and rescue. The U.S. Forest Service does not offer updated aggregated records on the official number of fatalities in the Wind River Range.

== See also ==
- List of mountain peaks of Wyoming
