= Yoritsugu =

- Pronunciation: joɾitsɯgɯ (IPA)
- Gender: Male

Origin
- Origin: Japanese
- Meaning: Different meanings depending on the kanji used

Other names
- Alternative spelling: Yoritugu (Kunrei-shiki) Yoritugu (Nihon-shiki) Yoritsugu (Hepburn)

Yoritsugu is a masculine Japanese given name.

== Written forms ==
Yoritsugu can be written using different combinations of kanji characters. Here are some examples:

- 頼次, "rely, next"
- 頼継, "rely, continue"
- 頼嗣, "rely, succession"
- 依次, "to depend on, next"
- 依継, "to depend on, continue"
- 依嗣, "to depend on, succession"

The name can also be written in hiragana よりつぐ or katakana ヨリツグ.

== Notable people with the name ==
- Yoritsugu Kinoshita (木下 頼継, ????–1600), Japanese samurai
- Yoritsugu Kujo (九条 頼嗣) (1239–1256), Japanese shōgun
- Yoritsugu Nose (能勢 頼次) (1562–1626), Japanese samurai
