= List of geographical noses =

Nose is used in the name of several geographical features and their associated settlements:

- Anthonys Nose (Victoria), a point or escarpment on the southern shore of Port Phillip Bay, in Victoria, Australia
- Anthony's Nose (Westchester), a peak along the Hudson River at the north end of Westchester County, New York
- Blake Nose, a submerged peninsula extending northeast from the North American continental shelf, about 280 miles east of Daytona Beach, Florida
- Bowerman's Nose, a stack of weathered granite on Dartmoor, Devon, England
- Brokers Nose, a point on the Illawarra Range, in the state of New South Wales, Australia
- Calgary Nose Hill, a federal electoral district in Alberta, Canada
- Calgary-Nose Creek, provincial electoral district that encompassed the Northern Central part of Calgary, Alberta
- Devil's Nose in Ecuador
- Devils Nose, Kentucky, unincorporated community in Bath County, Kentucky, United States
- Dolphin's Nose, Coonoor, a viewpoint and tourist spot in Coonoor, The Nilgiris District, Tamil Nadu
- Fawnie Nose (1,933 m or 6,342 ft), the highest summit of the Fawnie Range of the Nechako Plateau in the Central Interior of British Columbia, Canada
- Grey Nose Cape, a cape on the Côte d'Opale in the Pas-de-Calais département in northern France
- Jacob's Nose, 152 m (499 ft) mountain in Rosendale Village, a hamlet in the town of Rosendale, in Ulster County, New York
- Jerry's Nose, fishing community, part of a designated place in the Canadian province of Newfoundland and Labrador
- Long Nose Park, a 1.5-acre (0.61 ha) public open space at the end of Yurulbin Point on the Balmain Peninsula in Sydney, New South Wales, Australia
- Napoleon's Nose, a basaltic hill overlooking the city of Belfast, Northern Ireland
- Nose, Osaka, a town in Toyono District, Osaka Prefecture, Japan
- Nose Hill Park, the second largest urban park in Canada and one of the largest urban parks in North America
- Nose mound, a monument in Kyoto, Japan, dedicated to the sliced noses of killed Korean soldiers and civilians
- Nose Station, a train station in Tsubata, Kahoku District, Ishikawa Prefecture, Japan
- Roman Nose State Park, state park located in Blaine County, 7 miles (11 km) north of Watonga, Oklahoma
- Sharks Nose (3,729 m or 12,234 ft), a mountain in the southern Wind River Range in the U.S. state of Wyoming
- Tegg's Nose, a hill east of Macclesfield in Cheshire, England
- The Devil's Nose, a steep but small mountain ridge between the Little Cacapon and Potomac rivers in northeastern Hampshire County, West Virginia
- The Nose (El Capitan), one of the original technical climbing routes up El Capitan, a vertical rock formation in Yosemite National Park
- Vroman's Nose, prominent geological feature in the town of Fulton in Schoharie County, New York, United States
- White Nose, Dorset, a chalk headland on the English Channel coast at the eastern end of Ringstead Bay, east of Weymouth in Dorset, England

== See also ==
- Nose (disambiguation)
