= The Devil's Nose =

Mountain ridge in West Virginia, United States

Highest point
- Elevation: 1,119 ft (341 m)
- Coordinates: 39°36′32.4″N 78°06′47.8″W

Geography
- Location: Morgan County, West Virginia, U.S.
- Parent range: Ridge-and-Valley Appalachians
- Topo map: USGS Paw Paw

Climbing
- Easiest route: Hike

The Devil's Nose is a steep but small mountain ridge in West Virginia, US that spans from southwest to northeast.

From its southern end near Meadow Branch, The Nose rises from the landscape curving along a bend in the Meadow Branch Creek.

== See also ==
- List of geographical noses
