= The Nose (magazine) =

The Nose was a satirical magazine based in San Francisco. It was founded by Jack Boulware and David Latimer in 1988 and published from 1989 to 1995, with 5 issues a year.

Boulware said he conceived of The Nose as "a satirical investigative magazine along the lines of Spy. Except instead of New York and the Ivy League, it would be about the America I knew – the Western U.S., filled with crackers and outlaws and freaks."

Contributors to The Nose included Patton Oswalt, Marc Maron, Will Durst, Greg Proops, Gregg Turkington and Rebecca G. Wilson.

Topics covered by The Nose included: Area 51, Anton LaVey, deaths at Disneyland and Autoerotic asphyxiation with John Deere tractors.

The magazine ceased publication in 1995. Boulware attributes The Nose's demise to mismanagement of funds by the magazine's accountant.

Boulware and former Nose staffers and fans held a 20th-anniversary celebration at The Hemlock Tavern in April 2009.
