= Nose Yoritsugu =

Japanese samurai

Nose Yoritsugu (能勢頼次, 1562–1626) was a Japanese samurai of the Sengoku period who was a retainer of the Akechi clan. The Nose Myokenzan Temple was rebuilt by Nose Yoritsugu in 1603.
