= Watchtower (agricultural) =

Building used by farmers in ancient Western Asia

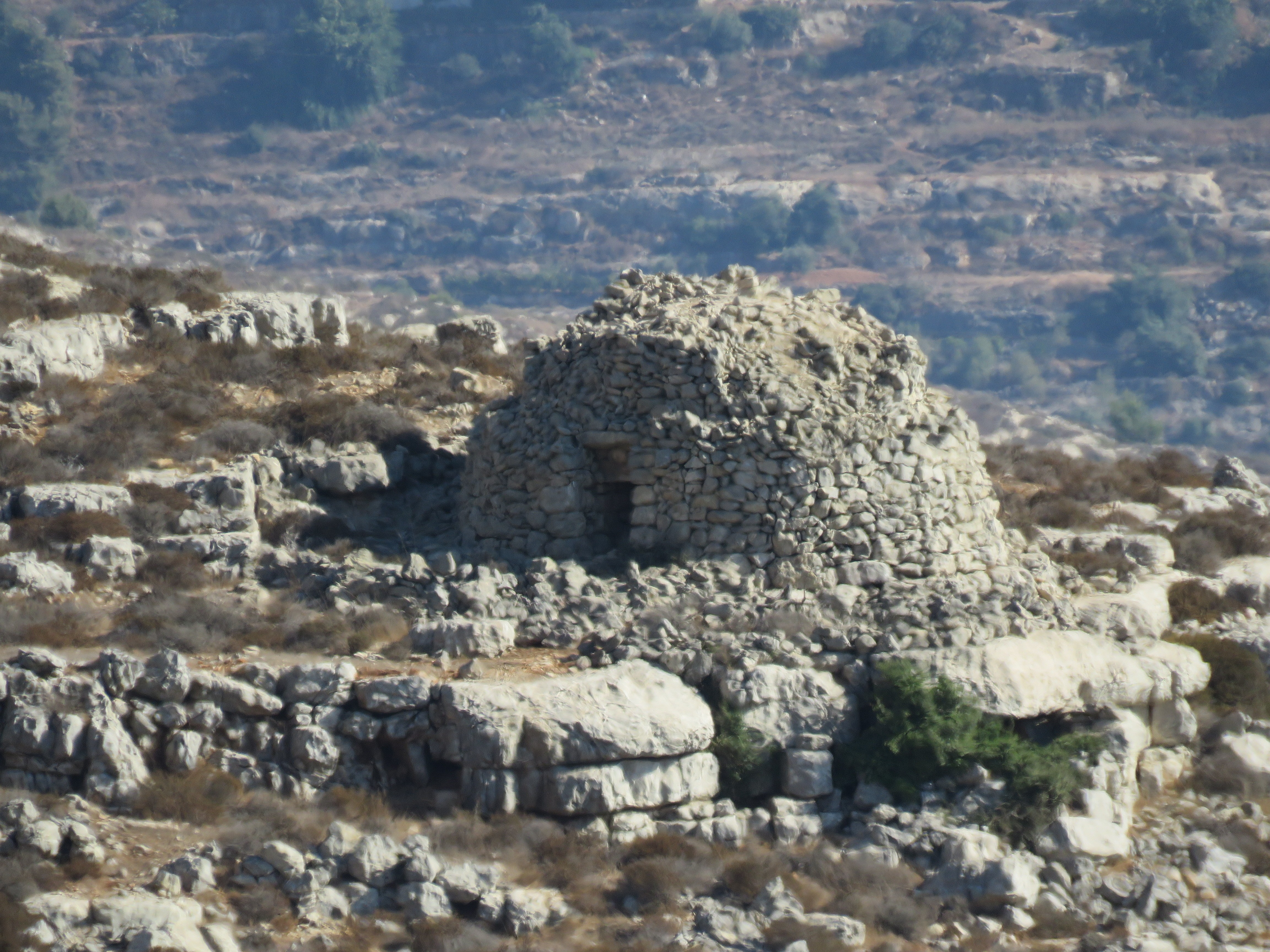
Remains of a watchtower near Ramallah.

An agricultural watchtower (Phoenician name: shomōr; Hebrew: שומרה shomerā; Arabic: قصر qāsr, "a castle") was a type of building in the ancient Middle East for farmers to watch over farmland (usually vineyards) during the harvest period.

== Description ==
The structures usually had two storeys, with a thick-walled lower floor made of untreated stone for storage of the harvest, and an upper floor that functioned as a watchtower. The temperature inside the structure was relatively cool due to the thick wall of the lower floor, allowing the storage of crops such as grapes, which would otherwise start to ferment. During the harvest period, farmworkers or entire families could live in the watchtower rather than return to their home each day.

British explorers Conder and Kitchener mentioned the vineyard towers as a remnant of ancient Jewish architecture. They described them as "solid and rude buildings" that can be found close to ancient tombs and rock-cut wine presses.

== In scripture ==
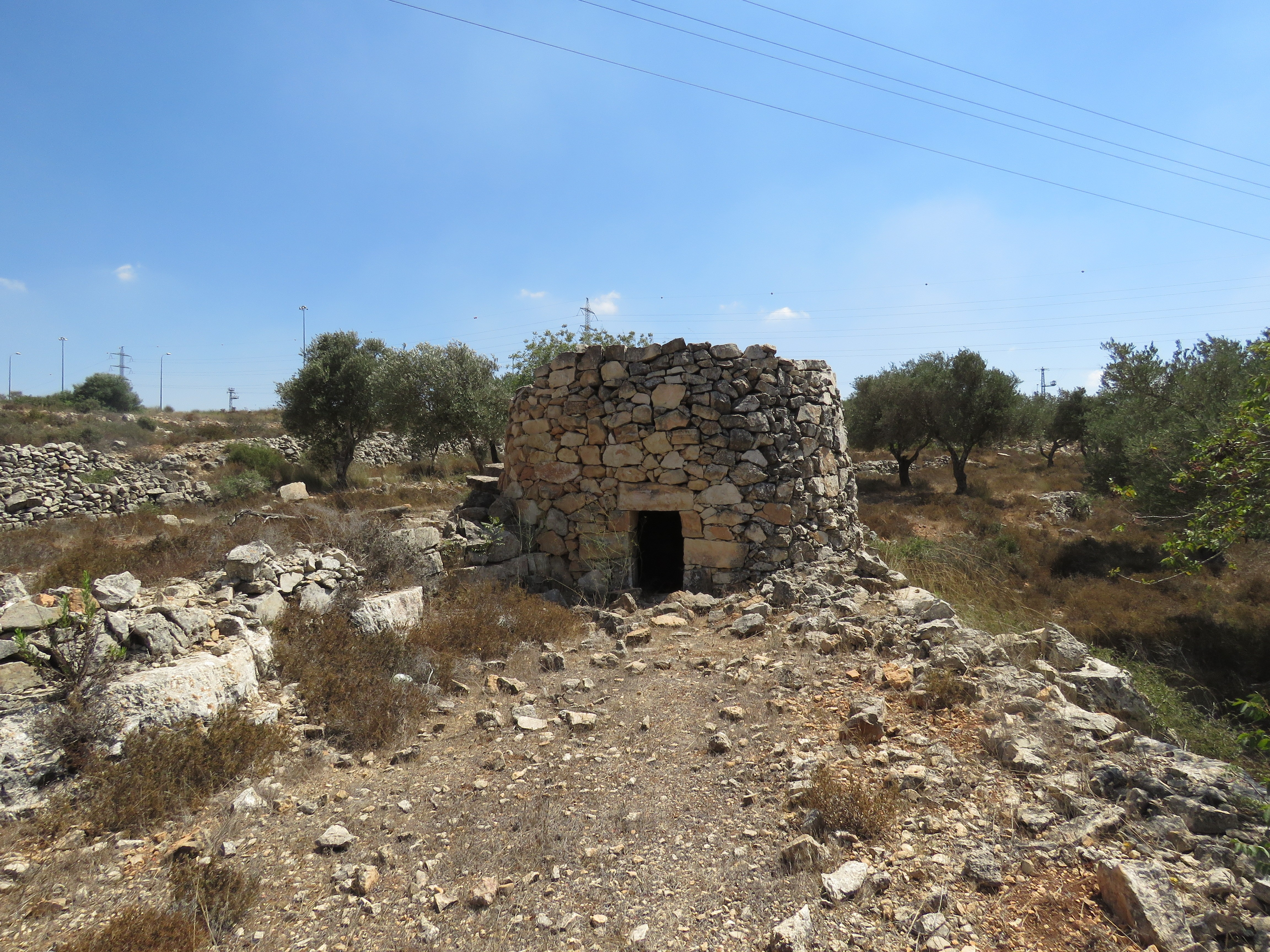
Remains of a watchtower near Beitunia

The Book of Isaiah (Isaiah 5:2) mentions a vineyard tower:

He dug it and cleared it of stones, and planted it with choice vines; he built a watchtower in the midst of it, and hewed out a wine vat in it; he expected it to yield grapes, but it yielded wild grapes.

It is also mentioned in the Gospel of Mark (Mark 12:1):

Then he began to speak to them in parables. “A man planted a vineyard, put a fence around it, dug a pit for the wine press, and built a watchtower; then he leased it to tenants and went to another country."

== Today ==
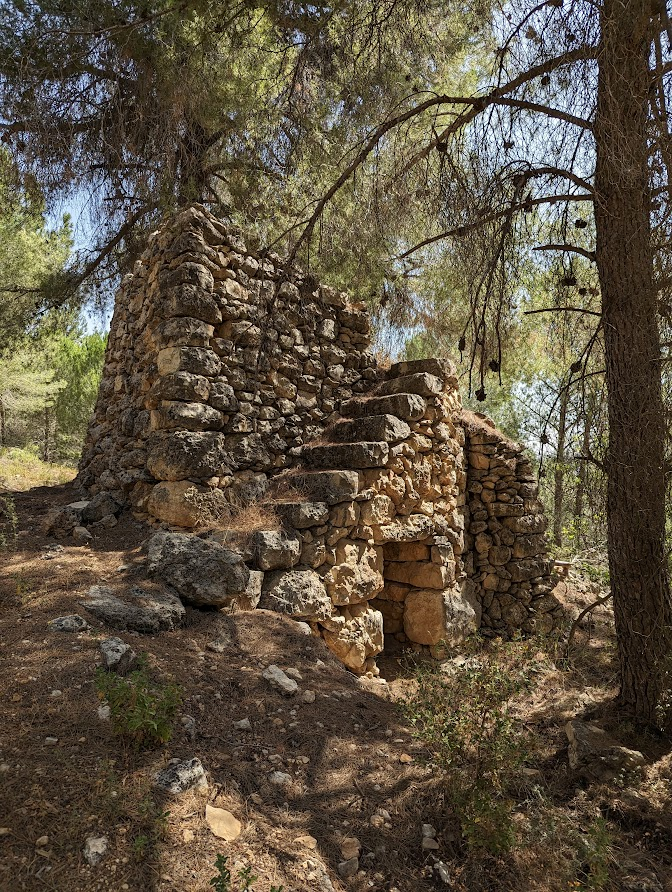
An almost intact watchtower, Mount Hereth, near Tzuba

Remains of watchtowers are found throughout Syria and Palestine, and some are still in use.

There are reportedly remains of more than a thousand towers in western Samaria.

== Bibliography ==
- Conder, C.R.; Kitchener, H.H. (1883). The Survey of Western Palestine: Memoirs of the Topography, Orography, Hydrography, and Archaeology. Vol. 3. London: Committee of the Palestine Exploration Fund.
- John A. Beck (2011). Zondervan Dictionary of Biblical Imagery. Watchtower. p. 267.
- Vineyard and Grape Pressing Life in the Holy Land.
