= Valentine Peak =

Mountain in the state of Wyoming

- Location within Wyoming Location within the United States

Highest point
- Elevation: 11,361 ft (3,463 m)
- Prominence: 681 ft (208 m)
- Coordinates: 42°51′26″N 109°11′49″W

Geography
- Location: Fremont County, Wyoming, U.S.
- Parent range: Wind River Range
- Topo map: USGS Lizard Head Peak

Valentine Peak is an 11,361-foot (3,463 m) mountain located in the southern Wind River Range in the U.S. state of Wyoming. Valentine Peak is 0.42 mi (0.68 km) southeast of Valentine Mountain and 2.2 mi (3.5 km) northwest of Mount Chauvenet. Valentine Peak is in the Popo Agie Wilderness of Shoshone National Forest.

== Hazards ==
Encountering bears is a concern in the Wind River Range. There are other concerns as well, including bugs, wildfires, adverse snow conditions, and nighttime cold temperatures.

Importantly, there have been notable incidents, including accidental deaths, due to falls from steep cliffs (a misstep could be fatal in this class 4/5 terrain) and due to falling rocks, over the years, including 1993, 2007 (involving an experienced NOLS leader), 2015 and 2018. Other incidents include a seriously injured backpacker being airlifted near SquareTop Mountain in 2005 and a fatal hiker incident (from an apparent accidental fall) in 2006 that involved state search and rescue. The U.S. Forest Service does not offer updated aggregated records on the official number of fatalities in the Wind River Range.
