= Hobbs Peak (Wyoming) =

Mountain in Wyoming, United States of America

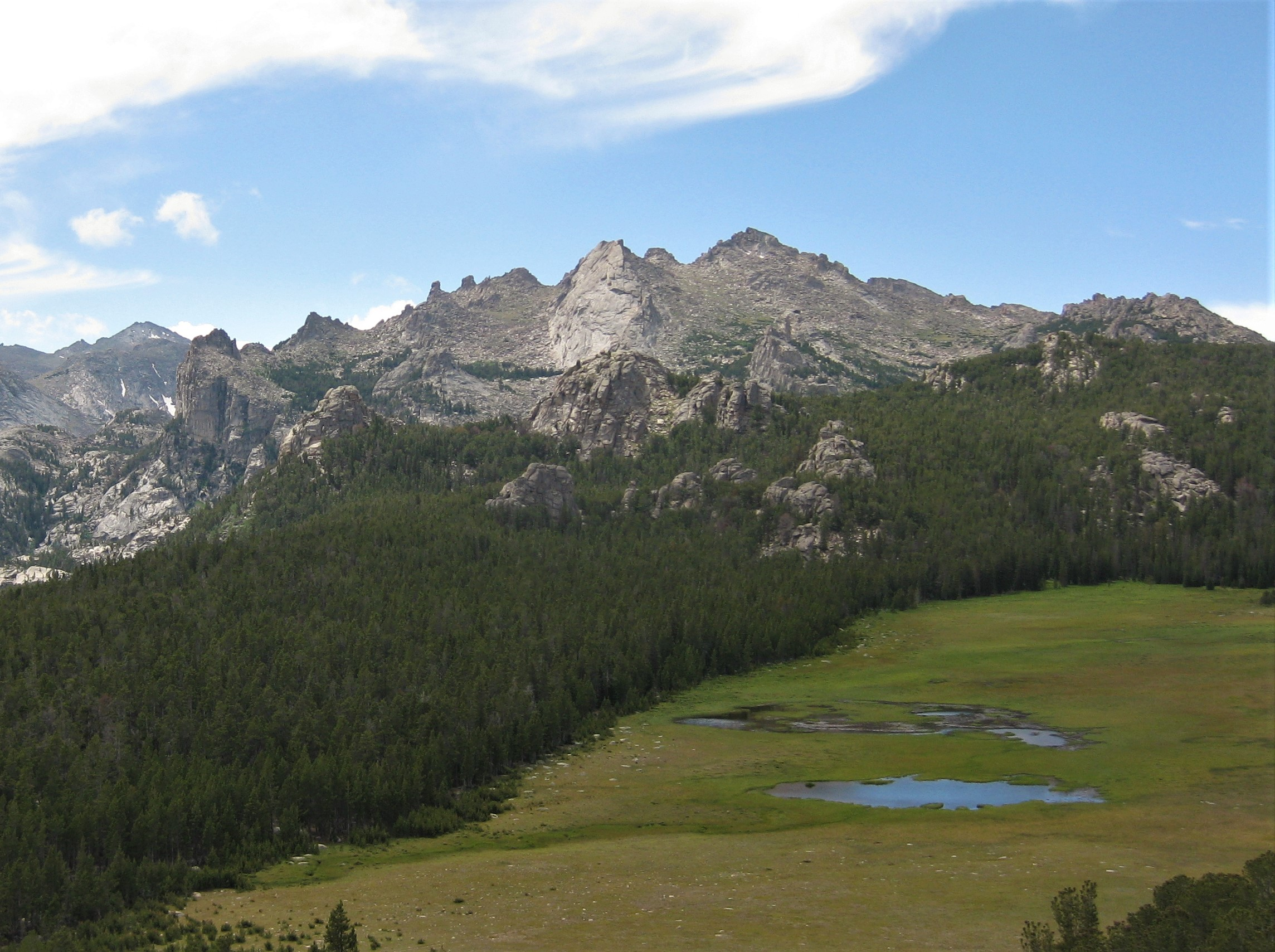
- East aspect of Hobbs Peak (Hobbs Park in foreground)

Highest point
- Elevation: 11,663 ft (3,555 m)
- Prominence: 403 ft (123 m)
- Parent peak: Lizard Head Peak (12,847 ft)
- Isolation: 0.85 mi (1.37 km)
- Coordinates: 42°51′54″N 109°07′29″W

Geography
- Location within Wyoming Location within the United States
- Country: United States
- State: Wyoming
- County: Fremont
- Protected area: Popo Agie Wilderness
- Parent range: Rocky Mountains; Wind River Range
- Topo map: USGS Dickinson Park

Geology
- Rock type: granitic

Climbing
- Easiest route: class 3 scrambling

Hobbs Peak is an 11,663-foot-elevation (3,555-meter) mountain summit in Fremont County, Wyoming, United States.

== Description ==
Hobbs Peak is located in the remote Wind River Range which is a subrange of the Rocky Mountains. It is set nine miles (14 km) east of the Continental Divide within the Popo Agie Wilderness, on land managed by Shoshone National Forest. Hobbs Peak ranks as the 40th-highest peak in the wilderness and is two miles (3.2 km) west of Hobbs Park. The nearest town is Lander, 18 miles (29 km) to the southeast. Precipitation runoff from the mountain drains into tributaries of the Wind River. Topographic relief is significant as the summit rises over 1,800 feet (550 meters) above Sand Lake in 0.85 mile (1.37 km). The mountain's toponym has been officially adopted by the United States Board on Geographic Names.

== Climate ==
According to the Köppen climate classification system, Hobbs Peak has an alpine subarctic climate with long, cold, snowy winters, and cool to warm summers. Due to its altitude, it receives precipitation all year, as snow in winter and as thunderstorms in summer.

Climate data for Hobbs Peak (WY) 42.8653 N, 109.1249 W, Elevation: 11,158 ft (3,401 m) (1991–2020 normals)
Month	Jan	Feb	Mar	Apr	May	Jun	Jul	Aug	Sep	Oct	Nov	Dec	Year
Mean daily maximum °F (°C)	23.8 (−4.6)	23.7 (−4.6)	29.7 (−1.3)	35.3 (1.8)	43.8 (6.6)	54.2 (12.3)	63.7 (17.6)	62.2 (16.8)	53.3 (11.8)	41.0 (5.0)	29.3 (−1.5)	22.8 (−5.1)	40.2 (4.6)
Daily mean °F (°C)	14.1 (−9.9)	13.2 (−10.4)	18.4 (−7.6)	23.5 (−4.7)	32.1 (0.1)	41.8 (5.4)	50.1 (10.1)	49.3 (9.6)	41.1 (5.1)	29.9 (−1.2)	19.7 (−6.8)	13.4 (−10.3)	28.9 (−1.7)
Mean daily minimum °F (°C)	4.3 (−15.4)	2.7 (−16.3)	7.2 (−13.8)	11.7 (−11.3)	20.5 (−6.4)	29.4 (−1.4)	36.4 (2.4)	36.4 (2.4)	28.8 (−1.8)	18.8 (−7.3)	10.1 (−12.2)	3.9 (−15.6)	17.5 (−8.1)
Average precipitation inches (mm)	1.86 (47)	2.04 (52)	2.81 (71)	4.57 (116)	5.08 (129)	2.60 (66)	1.30 (33)	1.19 (30)	2.00 (51)	2.52 (64)	2.02 (51)	1.99 (51)	29.98 (761)
Source: PRISM Climate Group

Hobbs Park is an elevated plain at the foot of Hobbs Peak. Hobbs Park also has a subarctic climate (Köppen Dfc) but is slightly warmer due to its lower elevation.

Climate data for Hobbs Park, Wyoming, 1991–2020 normals: 10100ft (3078m)
Month	Jan	Feb	Mar	Apr	May	Jun	Jul	Aug	Sep	Oct	Nov	Dec	Year
Mean daily maximum °F (°C)	29.7 (−1.3)	30.2 (−1.0)	36.7 (2.6)	42.0 (5.6)	49.7 (9.8)	58.6 (14.8)	67.3 (19.6)	65.6 (18.7)	56.6 (13.7)	45.0 (7.2)	34.6 (1.4)	27.9 (−2.3)	45.3 (7.4)
Daily mean °F (°C)	18.8 (−7.3)	18.6 (−7.4)	24.4 (−4.2)	29.5 (−1.4)	38.1 (3.4)	46.5 (8.1)	54.3 (12.4)	52.9 (11.6)	44.9 (7.2)	34.3 (1.3)	24.2 (−4.3)	17.7 (−7.9)	33.7 (1.0)
Mean daily minimum °F (°C)	7.9 (−13.4)	6.9 (−13.9)	12.1 (−11.1)	17.1 (−8.3)	26.6 (−3.0)	34.5 (1.4)	41.3 (5.2)	40.2 (4.6)	33.2 (0.7)	23.4 (−4.8)	13.8 (−10.1)	7.4 (−13.7)	22.0 (−5.5)
Average precipitation inches (mm)	1.58 (40)	1.91 (49)	2.99 (76)	4.19 (106)	4.50 (114)	2.27 (58)	1.15 (29)	1.14 (29)	1.92 (49)	2.42 (61)	1.83 (46)	1.84 (47)	27.74 (704)
Source 1: XMACIS2
Source 2: NOAA (Precipitation)

== Hazards ==
Encountering bears is a concern in the Wind River Range. There are other concerns as well, including bugs, wildfires, adverse snow conditions and nighttime cold temperatures.

Importantly, there have been notable incidents, including accidental deaths, due to falls from steep cliffs (a misstep could be fatal in this class 4/5 terrain) and due to falling rocks, over the years, including 1993, 2007 (involving an experienced NOLS leader), 2015 and 2018. Other incidents include a seriously injured backpacker being airlifted near Squaretop Mountain in 2005, and a fatal hiker incident (from an apparent accidental fall) in 2006 that involved state search and rescue.

== See also ==
- List of mountain peaks of Wyoming
- Mountains of Fremont County, Wyoming
