= Washakie Glacier =

Glacier in Wyoming, United States

- Location within Wyoming
- Type: Mountain glacier
- Location: Fremont County, Wyoming, USA
- Coordinates: 42°48′31″N 109°14′47″W
- Length: .20 mi (0.32 km)
- Terminus: Talus
- Status: Retreating

Washakie Glacier is on the east side of the Continental Divide in the southern Wind River Range in the U.S. state of Wyoming. The glacier is in the Popo Agie Wilderness of Shoshone National Forest. Washakie Glacier is situated in a north-facing cirque between Mount Washakie and Bair Peak.

== See also ==
- List of glaciers in the United States
