= Mount Washakie =

Mountain in Wyoming, United States

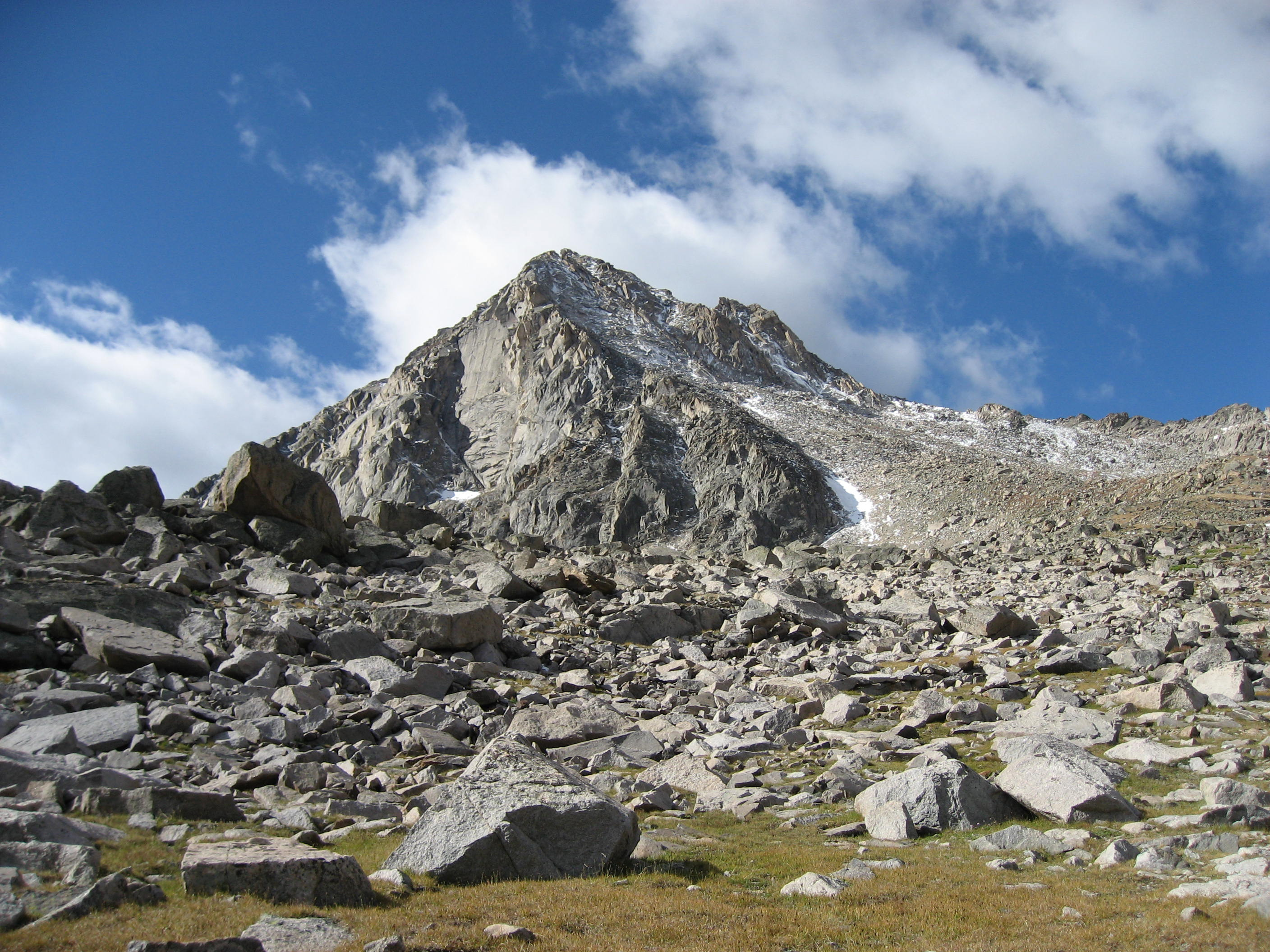
- North aspect

Highest point
- Elevation: 12,524 ft (3,817 m)
- Prominence: 1,084 ft (330 m)
- Coordinates: 42°48′49″N 109°15′23″W

Geography
- Location within Wyoming Location within the United States
- Location: Sublette and Fremont County, Wyoming, U.S.
- Parent range: Wind River Range
- Topo map: USGS Mount Bonneville

Climbing
- First ascent: 1930 Finis Mitchell

Mount Washakie (or Washakie Peak) (12,524 feet (3,817 m)) is located in the Wind River Range in the U.S. state of Wyoming. The mountain is on the Continental Divide in the Bridger Wilderness of Bridger-Teton National Forest and Popo Agie Wilderness of Shoshone National Forest. Washakie Glacier lies .50 mi (0.80 km) to the southeast of the peak.

== Hazards ==
Encountering bears is a concern in the Wind River Range. There are other concerns as well, including bugs, wildfires, adverse snow conditions and nighttime cold temperatures.

Importantly, there have been notable incidents, including accidental deaths, due to falls from steep cliffs (a misstep could be fatal in this class 4/5 terrain) and due to falling rocks, over the years, including 1993, 2007 (involving an experienced NOLS leader), 2015 and 2018. Other incidents include a seriously injured backpacker being airlifted near SquareTop Mountain in 2005, and a fatal hiker incident (from an apparent accidental fall) in 2006 that involved state search and rescue. The U.S. Forest Service does not offer updated aggregated records on the official number of fatalities in the Wind River Range.
