= Chauvenet =

Chauvenet may refer to:

== People ==
- Enrico Rossi Chauvenet (born 1984) Italian footballer
- Russ Chauvenet (1920–2003), chess champion and founder of science fiction fandom
- William Chauvenet (1820–1870), American mathematician and educator

== Other uses ==
- Chauvenet (crater), lunar crater
- Chauvenet Prize, award for mathematical expository writing
- Chauvenet's criterion, means of assessing whether a data point is flawed
- Mount Chauvenet, mountain in Wyoming, United States
- USS Chauvenet (AGS-11), United States naval vessel
- USNS Chauvenet (T-AGS-29), United States naval vessel
