= Cirque of the Towers =

Landform in Wyoming, US

Coordinates: 42°47′00″N 109°13′54″W

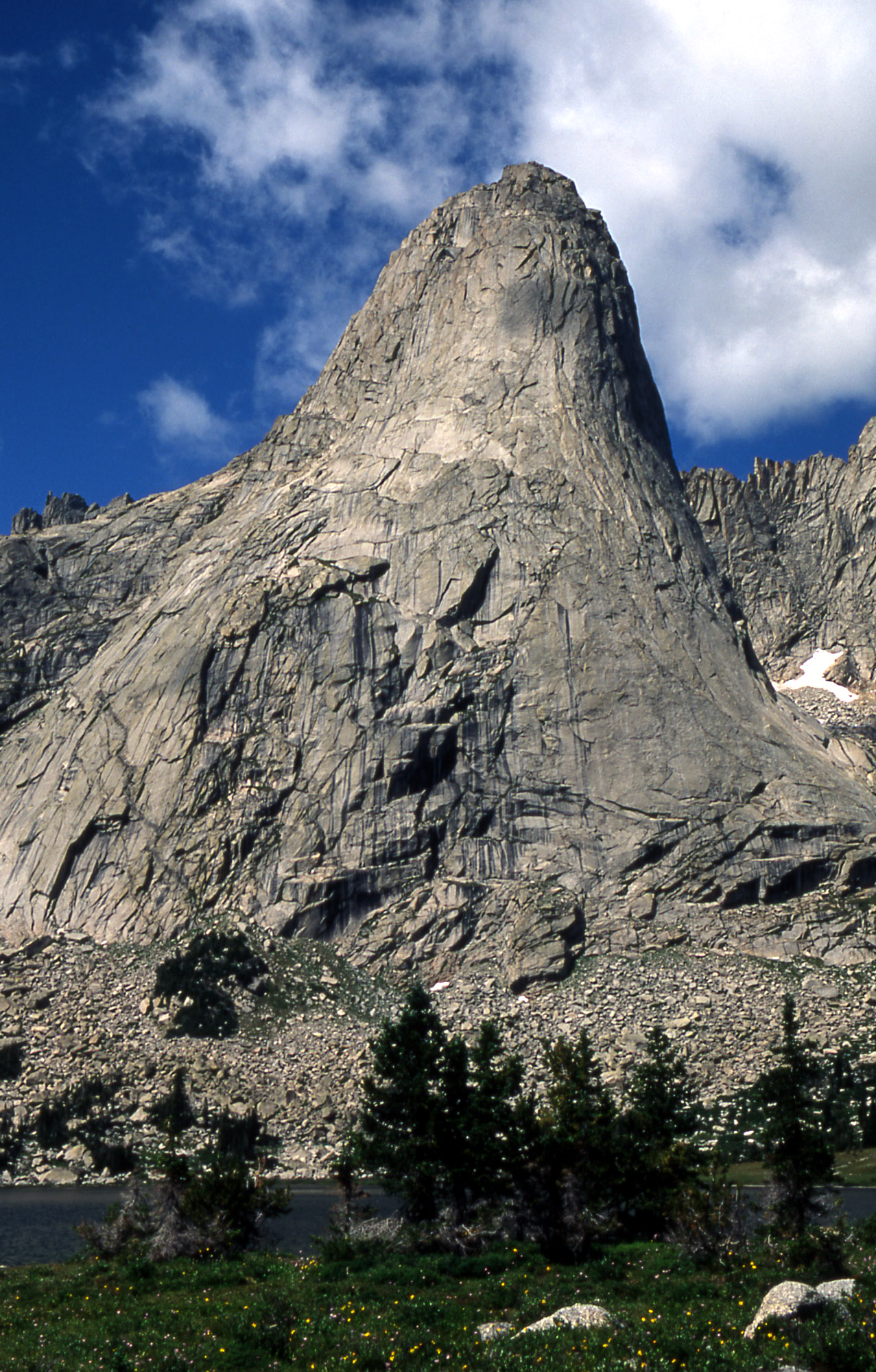
Pingora Peak is a popular climb for mountaineers who visit the cirque

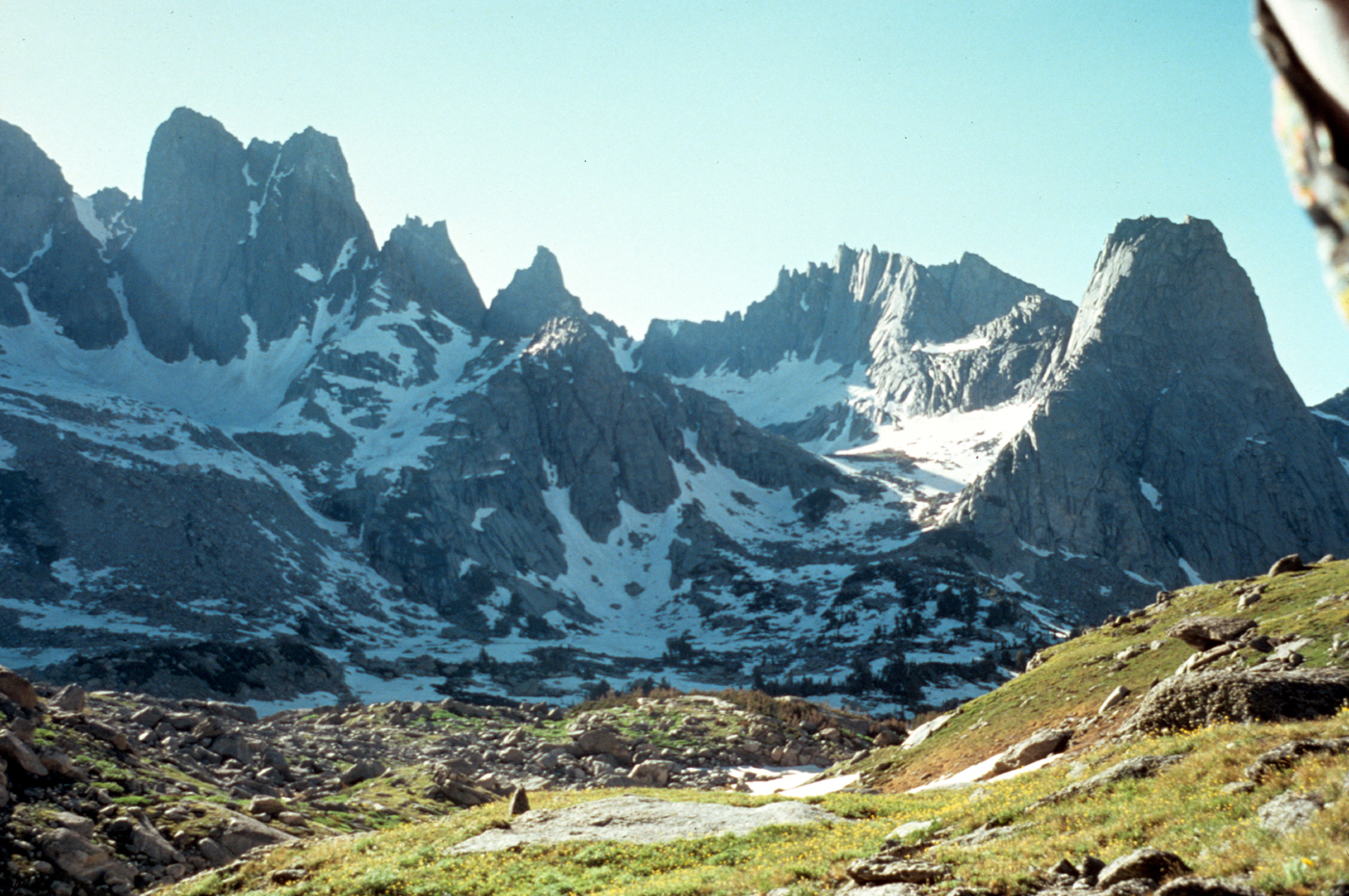
Cirque of the Towers (USGS)

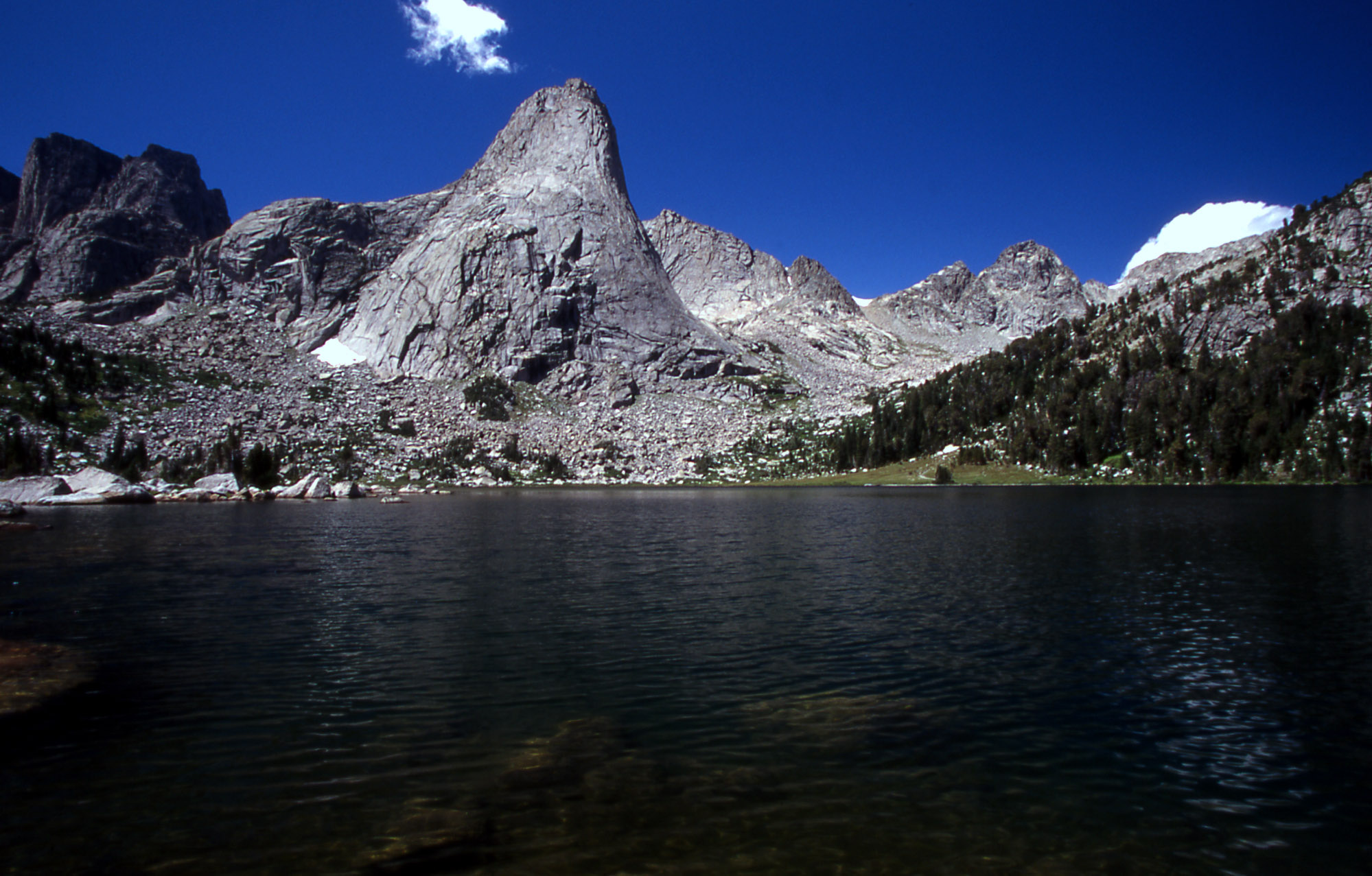
Pingora Peak rises above Lonesome Lake

The Cirque of the Towers is located in the Wind River Range Wyoming, U.S., part of which is in the Bridger Wilderness in Bridger-Teton National Forest, while the remainder is in the Popo Agie Wilderness in Shoshone National Forest. Located in the southern section of the Wind River Range (or "Winds" for short), the cirque is a very popular destination for technical rock climbers. Climber Orrin Bonney gave the area its current name in 1941 after his survey of the cirque. Prior to this, few if any visitors had ventured into the cirque due to the remote location. The cirque is an almost circular hole or valley carved by a glacier that retreated over 8,000 years ago. As is true with the rest of the Winds, the mountains are composed almost entirely of granite. The Continental Divide spans the crest of the main peaks.

The towers average 1,000 feet (300 m) lower in altitude than the highest mountains in the northern Winds, with Lizard Head Peak (12,847 ft (3,916 m)) being the tallest. Other individual mountains in the cirque include Shark's Nose, Warbonnet, Warrior Peak, Wolfs Head and Pingora Peak. There are hundreds of routes to choose from in difficulties ranging from 5.1 to 5.11a and since the mountains are composed primarily of granite rock, there is good anchoring. These climbs include two featured in Steck and Roper's Fifty Classic Climbs of North America the Northeast Face of Pingora (IV, 5.9) and the East Ridge of the Wolf's Head (III, 5.6).

For both the climber and backpacker, access to the cirque from the west from Pinedale, Wyoming requires a 55 mi (89 km) drive, partly paved and partly gravel, to the Big Sandy trailhead. There is a small National Forest campground at the trailhead. An 8.7 mi (14.0 km) hike beginning at 9,000 ft (2,700 m) above sea level is relatively level the first 7 mi (11 km) and becomes very steep the last mile (1.6 km) and ascends to Jackass Pass at 10,800 ft (3,300 m), crossing the continental divide. From there one must descend a steep half mile (800 m) to Lonesome Lake, which is one of four lakes in the cirque. Expect the trail to be busy in July and August as the cirque is the most popular hiking and climbing destination in the Wind River Range.

== Hazards ==
Lonesome Lake was the first lake in the Wind River Range whose water was deemed unfit for consumption due to human waste and consequently, no camping is permitted within a quarter mile (400 m) of the lake. The granitic rocks allow poor filtration of ground water and the ability of many alpine lakes to cleanse themselves is often poorer than one might find at lower altitudes.

Encountering bears is a concern in the Wind River Range. There are other concerns as well, including bugs, wildfires, adverse snow conditions and nighttime cold temperatures.

Importantly, there have been notable incidents, including accidental deaths, due to falls from steep cliffs (a misstep could be fatal in this class 4/5 terrain) and due to falling rocks, over the years, including 1993, 2007 (involving an experienced NOLS leader), 2015 and 2018. Other incidents include a seriously injured backpacker being airlifted near SquareTop Mountain in 2005, and a fatal hiker incident (from an apparent accidental fall) in 2006 that involved state search and rescue. The U.S. Forest Service does not offer updated aggregated records on the official number of fatalities in the Wind River Range.
