= Pingora Peak =

Granite peak in Wyoming, USA

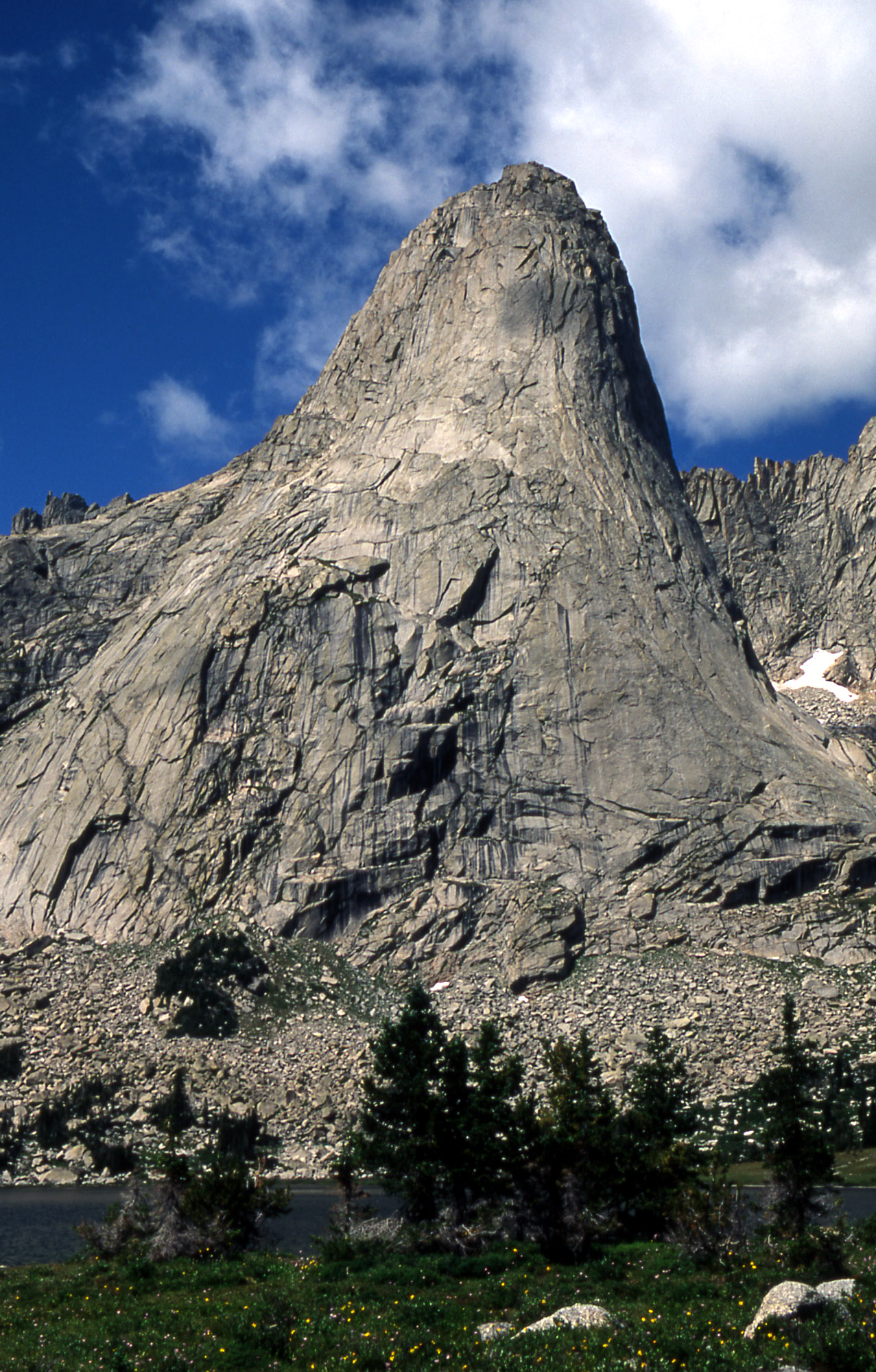

Highest point
- Elevation: 11,889 ft (3,624 m)
- Prominence: 284 ft (86 m)
- Listing
- Coordinates: 42.77920°N 109.2247°W

Geography
- Location: Shoshone National Forest, Fremont County, Wyoming, U.S.
- Parent range: Wind River Range

Pingora Peak (11,889 ft (3,624 m)) is a prominent granite peak in the U.S. state of Wyoming. The peak is one of the pinnacles that forms the Cirque of the Towers. Pingora Peak is in the Popo Agie Wilderness and part of the Wind River Range within the greater Shoshone National Forest. The Northeast Face route on Pingora Peak is recognized in the historic climbing text Fifty Classic Climbs of North America and considered a classic around the world.

== Hazards ==
Encountering bears is a concern in the Wind River Range. There are other concerns as well, including bugs, wildfires, adverse snow conditions and nighttime cold temperatures.

Importantly, there have been notable incidents, including accidental deaths, due to falls from steep cliffs (a misstep could be fatal in this class 4/5 terrain) and due to falling rocks, over the years, including 1993, 2007 (involving an experienced NOLS leader), 2015 and 2018. Other incidents include a seriously injured backpacker being airlifted near SquareTop Mountain in 2005, and a fatal hiker incident (from an apparent accidental fall) in 2006 that involved state search and rescue. The U.S. Forest Service does not offer updated aggregated records on the official number of fatalities in the Wind River Range.
