= Blackwater Natural Bridge =

Natural arch in Shoshone National Forest, Wyoming

Coordinates: 44°21′56″N 109°45′50″W

Blackwater Natural Bridge is a natural arch in Shoshone National Forest, Wyoming. The arch is located along a ridge at an elevation of 10,777 feet (3,285 m) and is a little over .50 mi (0.80 km) southwest of Coxcomb Mountain. Blackwater Natural Bridge is to the east of the headwaters of Blackwater Creek, which flows north to the North Fork Shoshone River. No official determination of the height or span of the arch has been completed and the estimated size of the arch varies greatly. The non-profit Natural Arch and Bridge Society states that the arch is anywhere from 70 to 100 feet (21 to 30 m) while other sources claim that it may be one of the largest in the world, with a span of 240 ft (73 m), a height of 280 ft (85 m) and with rock thickness of the arch at 32 ft (9.8 m).

Blackwater Natural Bridge is in a remote region that is off trail but can be viewed after a 14-to-18-mile (23 to 29 km) round-trip hike depending on starting point from the Blackwater Natural Bridge trailhead located off of U.S. Routes 14/16/20. The trailhead is a 37-mile (60 km) drive from Cody, Wyoming. The trail also leads past the site of the Blackwater fire of 1937 where 15 firefighters were killed and another 38 injured, and is the worst loss of life of firefighters in the history of Wyoming and one of the worst in U.S. history.
