= Mount Chauvenet =

Mountain in the state of Wyoming

- Location within Wyoming Location within the United States

Highest point
- Elevation: 12,255 ft (3,735 m)
- Prominence: 730 ft (220 m)
- Coordinates: 42°50′27″N 109°09′30″W

Geography
- Location: Fremont County, Wyoming, U.S.
- Parent range: Wind River Range
- Topo map: USGS Lizard Head Peak

Climbing
- First ascent: 1832 (Benjamin Bonneville)

Mount Chauvenet is a (12,255-foot (3,735 m)) mountain located in the southern Wind River Range in the U.S. state of Wyoming. Mount Chauvenet is 1.5 mi (2.4 km) northeast of Cathedral Peak in the Popo Agie Wilderness of Shoshone National Forest. Mount Chauvenet was one of the earliest peaks climbed by white explorers to the Wind River Range.

== Hazards ==
Encountering bears is a concern in the Wind River Range. There are other concerns as well, including bugs, wildfires, adverse snow conditions and nighttime cold temperatures.

Importantly, there have been notable incidents, including accidental deaths, due to falls from steep cliffs (a misstep could be fatal in this class 4/5 terrain) and due to falling rocks, over the years, including 1993, 2007 (involving an experienced NOLS leader), 2015 and 2018. Other incidents include a seriously injured backpacker being airlifted near SquareTop Mountain in 2005, and a fatal hiker incident (from an apparent accidental fall) in 2006 that involved state search and rescue. The U.S. Forest Service does not offer updated aggregated records on the official number of fatalities in the Wind River Range.
