= USS Chauvenet =

Minesweeper of the United States Navy

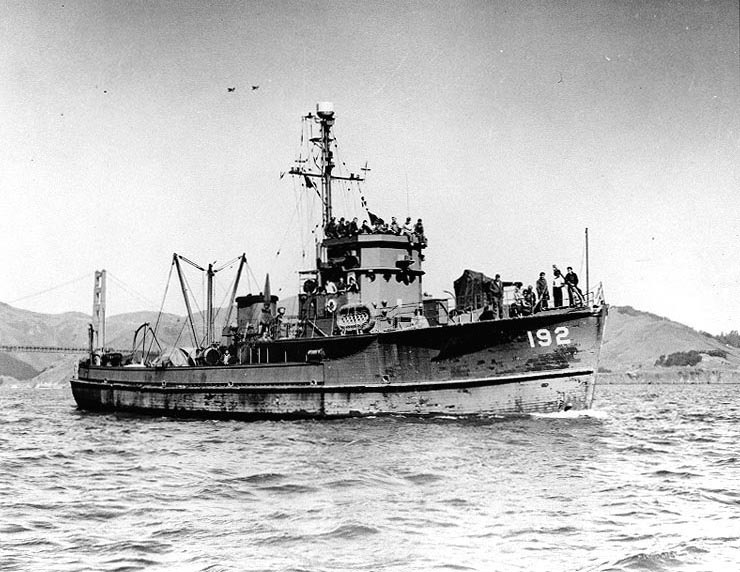
- A YMS-1-class minesweeper

History

United States
- Ordered: as YMS-195
- Laid down: 3 April 1942
- Launched: 10 August 1942
- Commissioned: 20 March 1943
- Decommissioned: 1946
- Stricken: 3 July 1946
- Fate: Foundered, 1963

General characteristics
- Displacement: 320 tons
- Length: 136 ft (41 m)
- Beam: 24 ft 6 in (7.47 m)
- Draught: 6 ft 1 in (1.85 m)
- Speed: 13 knots (24 km/h)
- Complement: 33
- Armament: one 3 in (76 mm) gun mount, two 20 mm machine guns

USS Chauvenet (AGS-11/YMS-195) was a YMS-1-class minesweeper of the YMS-135 subclass built for the United States Navy during World War II. She was constructed as USS YMS-195 at the Hiltebrant Dry Dock Company of Kingston, New York, and was laid down on 3 April 1942, launched on 10 August 1942, and commissioned on 20 March 1943.

On 20 March 1945, YMS-195 was reclassified as a survey ship and redesignated USS Chauvenet (AGS-11). After decommissioning, Chauvenet was sold to a British firm in 1947 and renamed Zipper. She was lost off South America in a storm in 1963.
