= Popo Agie Wilderness =

Wilderness area in Wyoming, United States

- IUCN category Ib (wilderness area)
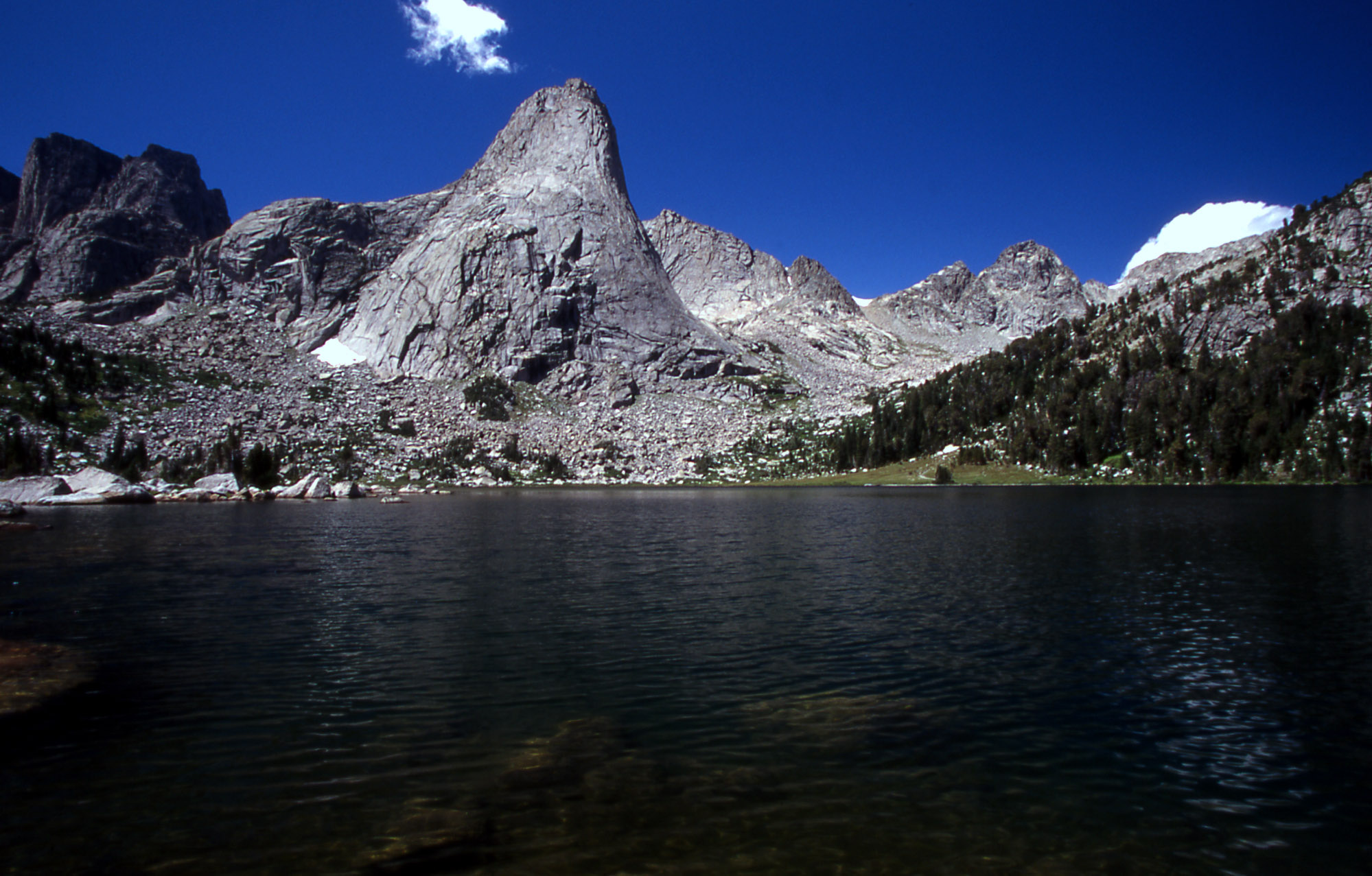
- Pingora Peak rises above Lonesome Lake in the Cirque of the Towers in the Popo Agie Wilderness

- Location within the United States
- Location: Fremont / Sublette counties, Wyoming, USA
- Nearest city: Lander, WY
- Coordinates: 42°46′0″N 109°13′0″W
- Area: 101,870 acres (412.3 km^{2})
- Established: 1984
- Governing body: U.S. Forest Service

Popo Agie Wilderness (/poʊˈpoʊʒə/ poh-POH-zhə) is located within Shoshone National Forest, Wyoming, United States. The wilderness consists of 101,870 acres (41,230 ha; 159.17 sq mi) on the east side of the continental divide in the Wind River Range. Originally set aside as a primitive area in 1932, in 1984 the Wyoming Wilderness Act was passed securing a more permanent protection status for the wilderness. The wilderness is a part of the 20,000,000 acres (8,100,000 ha; 31,000 sq mi) Greater Yellowstone Ecosystem.

U.S. Wilderness Areas do not allow motorized or mechanized vehicles, including bicycles. Although camping and fishing are allowed with proper permit, no roads or buildings are constructed and there is also no logging or mining, in compliance with the 1964 Wilderness Act. Wilderness areas within National Forests and Bureau of Land Management areas also allow hunting in season.

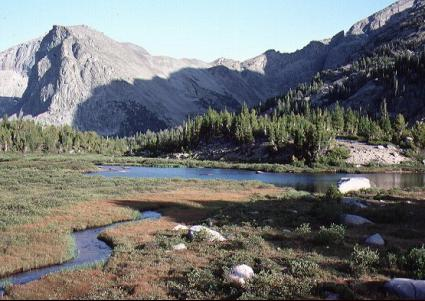
Popo Agie Wilderness

The Popo Agie Wilderness is a primarily sub-alpine and alpine region with the minimum elevation of 8,400 feet (2,600 m). Twenty mountains exceed 12,000 feet (3,700 m), with the highest being Wind River Peak at 13,192 feet (4,021 m). Perhaps the most visited area within the wilderness and the entire Wind River Range is the Cirque of the Towers due to the impressive granitic mountains and sheer cliffs which attract climbers from all over the world. Overuse has led to camping restrictions within the wilderness, especially in the proximity of Lonesone Lake which is located in the Cirque of the Towers. The wilderness spans a 25 miles (40 km) section of the southern Wind River Range.

Over 300 lakes and several tributaries of the Wind River are located in the wilderness. Rare reports of wolves have been documented and are considered to be from the wolf recovery efforts commenced in the late 20th century in Yellowstone National Park to the north. Additionally, reports of grizzly bears have been documented but they too are rare. Black bears, moose, elk, and pronghorn are the more commonly sighted megafauna. Trumpeter swans, bald eagles, hawks, and falcons inhabit the wilderness, especially near lakes and streams. Eight species and subspecies of trout, including a few found only in the Yellowstone region exist as well. The forest is dominated by lodgepole pine and Douglas fir, Engelmann Spruce, and subalpine fir at higher elevations up to the tree line.

The closest town is Lander, Wyoming. Access into the wilderness from the north via the Wind River Indian Reservation requires obtaining a permit before entering.

== See also ==
- List of U.S. Wilderness Areas
