= Shoshone National Forest =

National Forest in Wyoming, US

- IUCN category VI (protected area with sustainable use of natural resources)
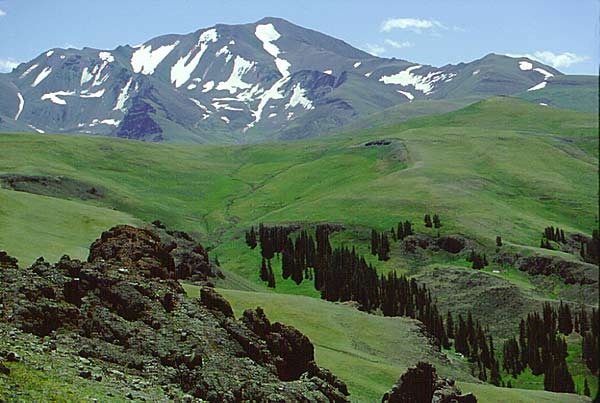
- Eagle Peak is the tallest peak in the Absaroka Range

- Location within Wyoming Location within the United States
- Location: Park, Fremont, Hot Springs, Sublette, and Teton counties, Wyoming, US
- Nearest city: Cody, WY
- Coordinates: 44°27′48″N 109°36′55″W
- Area: 2,469,248 acres (9,992.69 km^{2})
- Established: March 3, 1891
- Governing body: U.S. Forest Service
- Website: Shoshone National Forest

Shoshone National Forest (/ʃoʊˈʃoʊni/ shoh-SHOH-nee) is the first federally protected National Forest in the United States and covers nearly 2,500,000 acres (10,000 km^{2}) in the state of Wyoming. Originally a part of the Yellowstone Timberland Reserve, the forest is managed by the United States Forest Service and was created by an act of Congress and signed into law by U.S. president Benjamin Harrison in 1891. Shoshone National Forest is one of the first nationally protected land areas anywhere. Native Americans have lived in the region for at least 10,000 years, and when the region was first explored by European adventurers, forestlands were occupied by several different tribes. Never heavily settled or exploited, the forest has retained most of its wildness. Shoshone National Forest is a part of the Greater Yellowstone Ecosystem, a nearly unbroken expanse of federally protected lands encompassing an estimated 20,000,000 acres (81,000 km^{2}).

The Absaroka and Beartooth Mountains are partly in the northern section of the forest. The Wind River Range is in the southern portion and contains Gannett Peak, the tallest mountain in Wyoming. Yellowstone National Park forms part of the boundary to the west; south of Yellowstone, the Continental Divide separates the forest from its neighbor Bridger-Teton National Forest to the west. The eastern boundary includes privately owned property, lands managed by the U.S. Bureau of Land Management and the Wind River Indian Reservation, which belongs to the Shoshone and Arapahoe Indians. Custer National Forest along the Montana border is on the northern frontier. The Oregon Trail, the 19th century covered wagon route, passes just south of the forest, where broad and gentle South Pass allowed the migrants to bypass the rugged mountains to the north.

Shoshone National Forest is home to all of the original plant and animal species that were present when explorers first visited the region. The forest is notably inhabited by nearly all animal species found in North America, such as Grizzly bear, American black bear, gray wolf, bobcat, cougar, moose, and elk. Throughout the forest is more than 1,300 miles (2,100 km) of hiking trails and 32 campgrounds. Within the forest there are five wilderness areas, these areas protect more than half of the total area of managed land from development.

== Human history ==
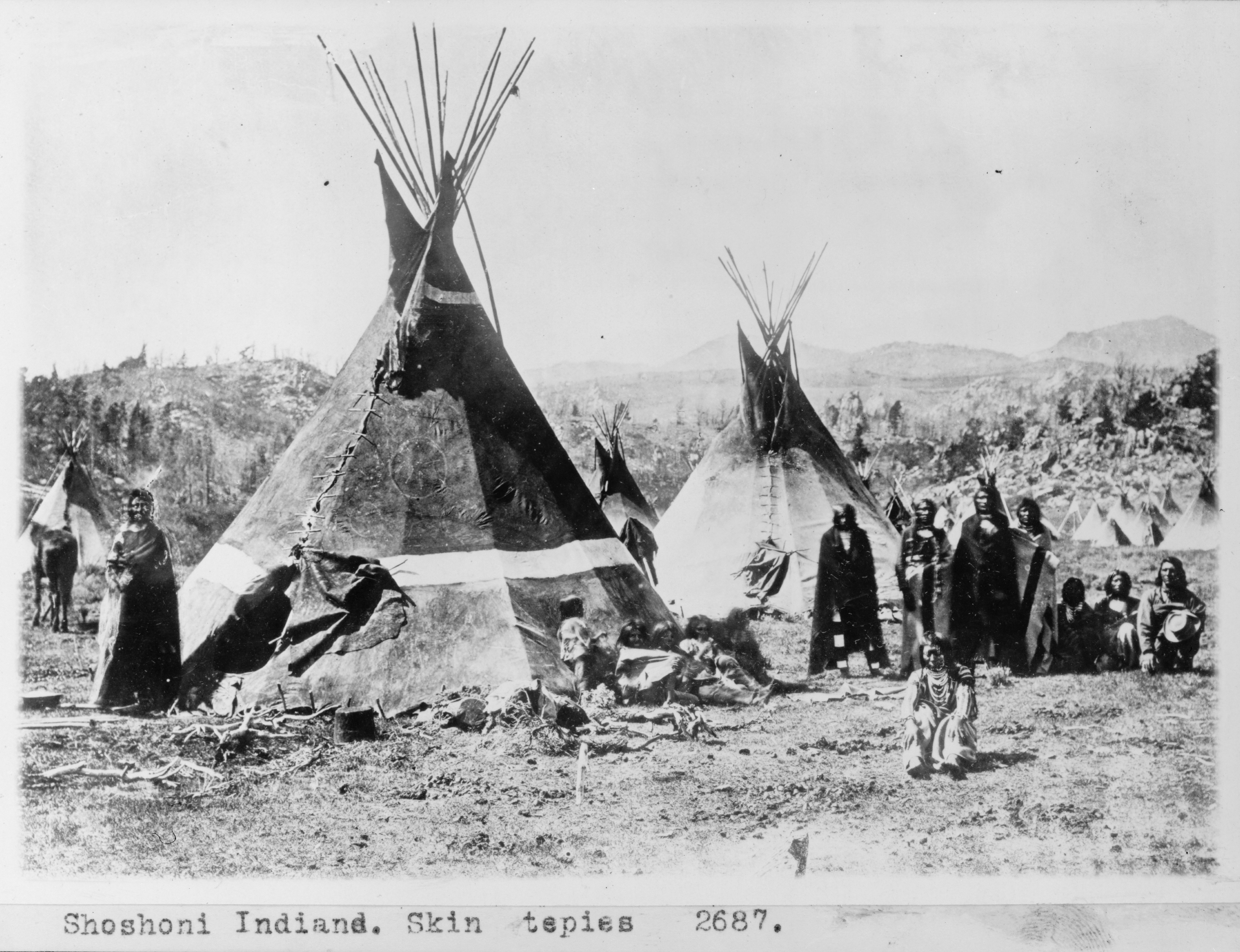
Shoshone encampment in the Wind River Mountains of Wyoming, photographed by W. H. Jackson, 1870

Shoshone National Forest is named after the Shoshone Indians, who, along with other Native American groups such as the Lakota, Crow and Northern Cheyenne, were the major tribes encountered by the first European explorers into the region. Archeological evidence suggests that the presence of people in the area extends back at least 10,000 years. The forest provided an abundance of game meat, wood products, and shelter during the winter months from the more exposed high plains to the east. Portions of the more mountainous regions were frequented by the Shoshone and Sioux for spiritual healing and vision quests. By the early 1840s, Washakie had become the leader of the easternmost branch of the Shoshone Indians. At the Fort Bridger Treaty Council of 1868 Washakie negotiated with the U.S. Government for 44,000,000 acres (180,000 km^{2}) to be preserved as tribal lands. Subsequent amendments to the treaty reduced the actual acreage to approximately 2,000,000 acres (8,100 km^{2}) and is known today as the Wind River Indian Reservation.

In 1957, Mummy Cave was rediscovered by a local resident on the north side of the North Fork Shoshone River, adjacent to U.S. Routes 14/16/20, 15 mi (24 km) east of Yellowstone National Park. Subsequent archeological excavations in the 1960s produced evidence that the cave had been occupied for over 9,000 years. The oldest deposits in the cave yielded prismatic stone blades and other artifacts created by paleoindians and the surrounding soils were radiocarbon dated to 7,300 BC. The evidence indicates the cave was occupied from at least 7,280 BC to 1580 AD. Besides projectile points, the cave also produced well preserved feathers, animal hides and other usually perishable materials. Additionally, the mummified remains of an individual buried inside a rock cairn were unearthed, which were dated to 800 AD. Considered one of the finest paleoindian archeological assemblages in the Rocky Mountain region, the site was placed on the National Register of Historic Places list in 1981.

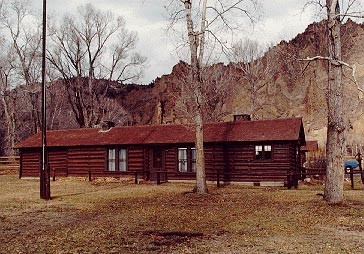
Wapiti Ranger Station

In the early 19th century, the forest was visited by mountain men and explorers such as John Colter and Jim Bridger. Colter is the first white man known to have visited both the Yellowstone region and the forest, which he did between 1807 and 1808. Having been an original member of the Lewis and Clark Expedition, Colter requested permission from Meriwether Lewis to leave the expedition after it had finished crossing the Rocky Mountains during their return journey from the Pacific Ocean. Colter teamed up with two unaffiliated explorers the expedition had encountered, but soon thereafter decided to explore regions south of where his new partners wished to venture. Traveling first into the northeastern region of what is today Yellowstone National Park, Colter then explored the Absaroka Range, crossing over Togwotee Pass and entering the valley known today as Jackson Hole. Colter survived a grizzly bear attack and a pursuit by a band of Blackfeet Indians who had taken his horse. The explorer later provided William Clark, who had been his commander on the Lewis and Clark Expedition, with previously unknown information on the regions he had explored, which Clark published in 1814.

Travels by fur trappers and adventurers, such as Manuel Lisa and Jim Bridger from 1807 to 1840, completed the exploration of the region. With the decline of the fur trade in the late 1840s and much of the prized beaver long since made scarce by over-trapping, few explorers entered the forest over the next few decades. The first federally financed expedition which passed through portions of Shoshone National Forest was the Raynolds Expedition of 1860, led by topographical engineer Captain William F. Raynolds. The expedition included geologist and naturalist Ferdinand Vandeveer Hayden and was guided by mountain man Jim Bridger. Though the Raynolds Expedition was focused on exploration of the Yellowstone region, several efforts to enter what later became Yellowstone National Park were impeded by heavy snows across the mountain passes such as Two Ocean Pass. The expedition finally crossed the northern Wind River Range at a pass they named Union Pass and entered Jackson Hole valley to the south of Yellowstone. Hayden led another expedition through the region in 1871. Hayden was primarily interested in documenting the Yellowstone country west of the forest, but his expedition also established that the forest was a prime resource that merited protection.

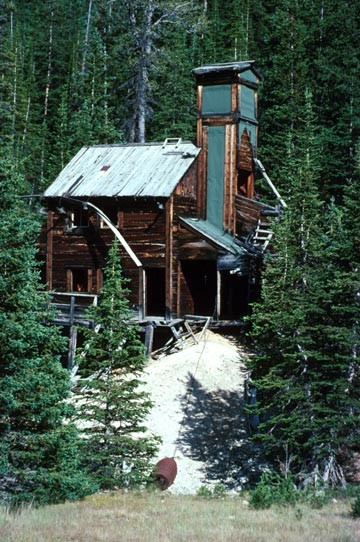
Wolf mine shaft at abandoned gold mine

Prior to the establishment of the Wind River Indian Reservation, the U.S. Cavalry constructed Fort Brown on the reservation lands, which was subsequently renamed Fort Washakie. During the late 19th century, the fort was staffed by African-American members of the U.S. Cavalry, better known as the Buffalo Soldiers, including the second African-American graduated from the United States Military Academy, John Hanks Alexander. Chief Washakie is buried at the fort, which is located immediately east of the forest boundary. Rumor has it that Sacajawea, the Shoshone Indian who provided invaluable assistance to Meriwether Lewis and William Clark during the Lewis and Clark Expedition, is also buried here, but it is now considered that this is unlikely and that her actual burial place was Fort Lisa in North Dakota.

During the last decade of the 19th century, minerals such as gold were mined with limited success. The last mine was abandoned in 1907, but panning for gold is still allowed in many areas of the forest, and in most circumstances no permit is required. After the end of the mining era, numerous camps were established by the Civilian Conservation Corps to help combat unemployment during the Great Depression of the 1930s. The camps housed groups of unemployed men who were paid by the federal government to build roads, hiking trails, and campgrounds for future travelers to the Yellowstone region. Visitation to national forests like Shoshone increased dramatically after World War II with the advent of better roads and accessibility to the region.

In 1911, Edwin Branson established a geology field camp for the University of Missouri in the forest, near Sinks Canyon State Park. It is the longest continuously running geology field camp in the United States. The first few years of instruction at the field laboratory included tent camping around the Wind River Range before a formal campsite was established near the Middle Fork of the Popo Agie and in 1929, a educational property lease was arranged with the Forest Service. Students and instructors built cabins on the property that are still used today. In 1948, in honor of his retirement, the camp was renamed from Camp Lander to the Edwin B. Branson Field Laboratory.

== National forest created ==
The Forest Reserve Act of 1891 authorized the president to set aside public domain land for forests. Prior to this law, most transfer of public land had been into private ownership. In 1891, creating the nation's first forest reserve, President Benjamin Harrison set aside the Yellowstone Timberland Reserve.

In 1902, President Roosevelt first greatly expanded the reserve and then divided the reserve into four separate units, with Shoshone being the largest. Upon the creation of the U.S. Forest Service in 1905, the reserve was designated a National Forest, but the current wording and title were formulated forty years later in 1945. A remnant of the earliest years of the forest management is the Wapiti Ranger Station which is located west of Cody, Wyoming. The station was built in 1903 and is the oldest surviving ranger station in any national forest, and is now designated a National Historic Landmark.

== Forest management ==
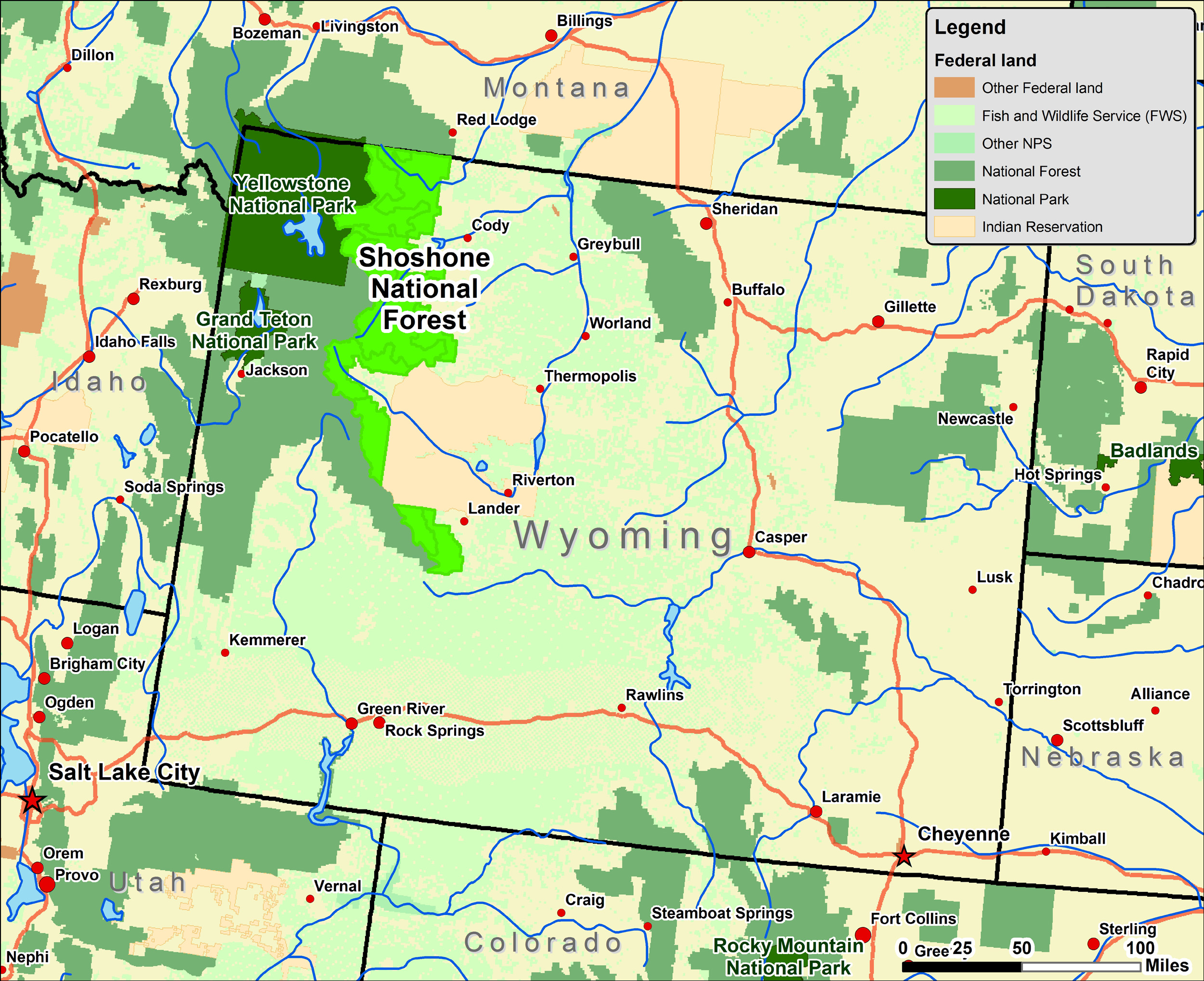
Shoshone National Forest highlighted in light green

Shoshone National Forest is managed by the U.S. Forest Service, an agency within the U.S. Department of Agriculture. The forest is separated into five districts and from 2008 and 2012 had an average staff of 165 employees and an annual operating budget of $17,500,000. The headquarters and a visitor center are in Cody, Wyoming and a smaller information center is in Lander, Wyoming. There are local ranger district offices in Cody, Dubois and Lander.

Shoshone National Forest practices conservation of resources, which ensures a sustainable flow of some raw materials from the forest, such as lumber for construction purposes and wood pulp for paper products. The forest averages an annual harvest of 4.5 million board-feet of timber for the purposes of commercial log home construction and another 2.5 million board-feet of wood collection from dead and down trees that are used for firewood and poles. Additionally, low-scale mineral extraction and oil and gas exploration and recovery are also conducted, though in Shoshone National Forest this has become less common due to a consensus to protect the natural surroundings. Only 8,570 acres (3,470 ha) of oil and gas leases were filed as of 2013. More common than logging and mining are the lease options that are offered to ranchers to allow them to graze cattle and sheep. The U.S. Forest Service provides guidelines and enforces environmental regulations to ensure that resources are not overexploited and that necessary commodities are available for future generations, though conservation groups have voiced concerns over the management practices of the leasing program and especially cattle overgrazing problems. Leases for sheep grazing have declined considerably since the 1940s while cattle grazing has remained relatively constant.

== Natural resources ==
=== Flora ===
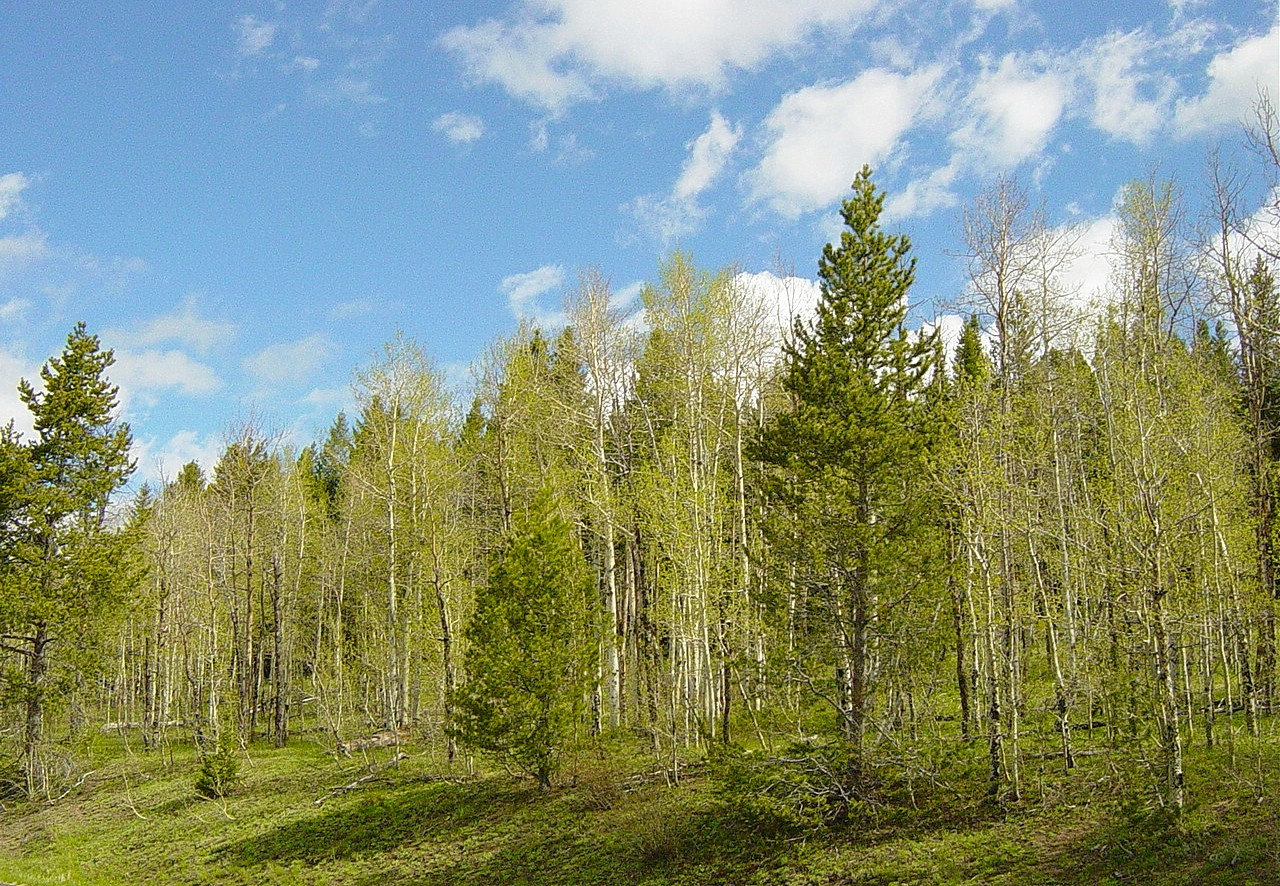
A grove of quaking aspen and lodgepole pine in the spring

Shoshone National Forest is an integral part of the Greater Yellowstone Ecosystem, which has 1,700 documented species of plants. Since the elevation of the land in the forest ranges from 4,600 to 13,804 ft (1,402 to 4,207 m), which is more than 9,000 ft (2,700 m), the forest has a wide variety of ecosystems. Lower elevations often have sagebrush and grass-dominated vegetation types, while forested areas are dominated by various combinations of tree and shrub species. These include lodgepole pine, which along with Rocky Mountain juniper, and quaking aspen are found at elevations up to 9,000 ft (2,700 m). At higher elevations subalpine fir, Engelmann spruce, whitebark pine and limber pine, are common, each occurring up to timberline. The region above timberline makes up 25 percent of the total acreage of the forest and of that 13 percent is listed as just either barren, rock or ice. The types of plant species is highly dependent on the amount of water available, and trees are more commonly found on higher slopes due to the longer lasting snowfall which keeps the soil moister for a longer time into the summer months. Along lower elevation riparian corridors, cottonwoods and willows are typically dominant. Numerous plant species are endemic to the region including some that are rare. Among them, the whitlow grass, fremont bladderpod, shoshonea, and the north fork Easter daisy provide vivid white and yellow flowers during the spring and summer.

Exotic species of flora that are not native to the region include Canada thistle, Musk thistle, Spotted knapweed, Leafy spurge and Yellow toadflax. These non-native plant species are considered noxious, impacting native plant communities and the species that thrive on them. Native species such as the mountain pine beetle are having an enormous negative impact on some tree species. A survey of the forest performed in 2010 indicated that over 1,000,000 acres (400,000 ha) of timberland had been impacted by insects such as the mountain pine beetle, spruce bark beetle and Douglas fir beetle, and that the insects had killed between 25 and 100 percent of the trees in the impacted areas. The forest service is addressing the situation by performing controlled burns, selling dead trees as firewood, timber harvesting and spraying the highest value areas.

=== Fauna ===
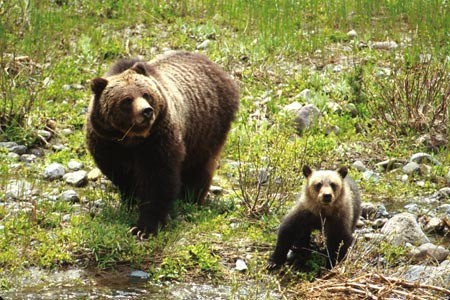
Grizzly bear mother and cub

Since the migration of the endangered gray wolf into Shoshone National Forest after the successful wolf reintroduction program in the Yellowstone region commenced in the mid-1990s, all of the known 70 mammal species that existed prior to white settlement still exist in the forest. Altogether, at least 335 species of wildlife call Shoshone National Forest their home, including the largest population of Bighorn sheep and one of the few locations Grizzly bears can still be found in the contiguous U. S.

At least 700 grizzly bears are believed to exist in the Greater Yellowstone Ecosystem, which includes Shoshone National Forest, with approximately 125 grizzlies in the forest. The grizzly is listed as a threatened species by the U.S. Fish and Wildlife Service, and the forest is one of their last strongholds. Non-lethal traps are set to capture nuisance bears, which are then relocated to remote areas away from civilization. In the case of the grizzly, each captured bear is tranquilized and then ear tagged with an identifying number. Each number is registered, and if the bear continues to return to areas where they pose a risk of imminent threat to human safety, they are exterminated. The grizzly recovery efforts implemented by federal agencies have often resulted in major disagreements with local landowners and surrounding municipalities. This situation occurs less frequently with the smaller and less aggressive black bear. An active management program, in conjunction with other National Forests and National Parks within the Greater Yellowstone Ecosystem, works cooperatively to maximize human safety and to ensure habitat protection for both species of endemic bears. Visitors are mandated to store their food in their vehicles or in steel containers found in campgrounds, and bear-proof trash receptacles are located in the front-country zones throughout the forest. In the backcountry, food must be stored some distance from campsites, and other related precautions are enforced to help prevent bad encounters.

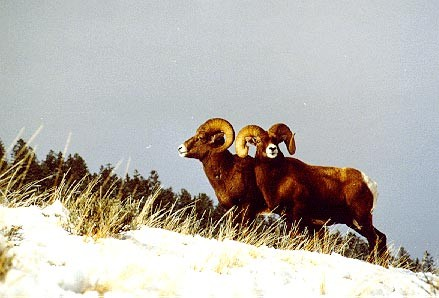
Bighorn Sheep

Cougars and timber wolves are large apex predators that inhabit the forest. Since the 1990s wolf reintroduction program in Yellowstone National Park, wolves have migrated into the forest and established permanent packs. Approximately a dozen wolf packs totaling 70 individual wolves were documented in the forest in 2012. The wolf was delisted as endangered once their population levels had reached management objectives and limited hunting of wolves was permitted in the forest starting in 2012. Cougars are generally nocturnal and rarely seen but hunting of this species is also allowed in highly regulated harvests. Wolverines are rare and elusive so documentation is often only from their tracks. The Canada lynx was native to the forest, but no known populations may still exist due to the rarity of its primary food source, the Snowshoe hare. Shoshone National Forest is considered critical habitat for lynx recovery since the species is listed as threatened under the Endangered Species Act and the forest is in their historical range. Other generally carnivorous mammals include coyote, bobcat, weasel, marten, ferret and badger.

Omnivorous mammals such as the raccoon and skunk and herbivore mammal species such as the porcupine and pika, are common to the forest. The beaver is considered a species of special interest to Shoshone National Forest since its dam building activities improve habitat for numerous other species such as the moose, breeding waterfowl, various amphibians and other species dependent on a riparian environment.

Native herbivores such as the moose are found in small numbers near waterways, especially at lower elevations. Moose populations in northwestern Wyoming and other areas of North America have been on the decline since the end of the 20th century, possibly due to a parasite. There were an estimated 739 moose in the forest in 2006 which is almost 300 fewer than there were 20 years earlier. Other ungulate species are much more common and there are over 20,000 elk (also known as wapiti) and 40,000 mule deer. Bighorn sheep and mountain goats inhabit the rocky terrain and highest elevations. During the winter, one of the largest bighorn sheep herds in the lower 48 states congregate in the region around Dubois, Wyoming; however, their numbers since 1990 have been diminished due to disease transmitted from contact with domesticated sheep and goats. An estimated 5,000 bighorn sheep are found throughout the forest and a small but stable population of 200 mountain goats reside in the northernmost portions of the forest. Bison and pronghorn antelope are two other ungulates that live on the forest and have sustainable populations.

An estimated 300 species of birds are found in the forest at least part of the year. Bald eagle, peregrine falcon, Swainson's hawk and the prairie falcon are birds of prey that are relatively common. Waterfowl such as Western grebe, Northern pintail, Great blue heron and Barrow's goldeneye have stable populations and rare sightings of Trumpeter swans are reported. pheasant, ruffed grouse and wild turkey are widely distributed across the open sage lands. Harlequin duck and northern goshawk are generally rare but management plans were implemented to protect various habitats these two species frequent to try and increase their population numbers.

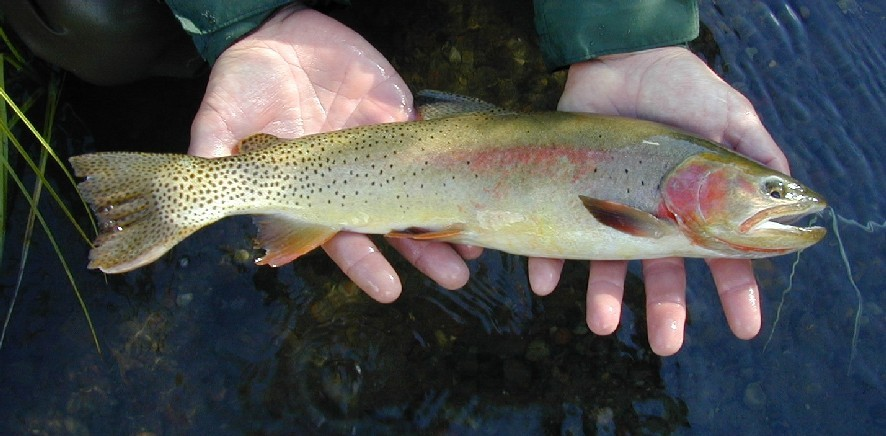
Yellowstone cutthroat trout

Fish found in Shoshone National Forest include at least six species and subspecies of trout including rainbow, brook and brown trout. The Yellowstone cutthroat trout is widespread throughout the Greater Yellowstone Ecosystem, but in the forest is mostly limited to the Shoshone River. The mountain whitefish is also found in the Shoshone River, while the burbot is found in two streams in the southern regions of the forest.

There are more than a dozen species of reptiles in the forest including the venomous prairie rattlesnake which can be found at lower elevations. The western painted and the ornate box turtle are turtle species known to exist and about eight species of lizards such as the greater short-horned lizard have been documented. Amphibians such as the Columbia spotted frog and the boreal toad are considered species of concern because of their high susceptibility to disease, habitat loss and human introduced toxins. Boreal toads are found at elevations of between 7,380 and 11,800 ft (2,250 and 3,600 m) and the Columbia spotted frog can live at elevations as high as 9,480 ft (2,890 m) in the Greater Yellowstone Ecosystem.

Exotic species of fauna such as the zebra and quagga mussels and the New Zealand mud snail are invasive species that can greatly impact fish species. Though the mussel species are not known to be in Wyoming, several surrounding regions have reported them. The New Zealand mud snail has been found in the Shoshone River east of the forest. Forest managers have established a preventative program to try to keep these species from entering forest waterways.

=== Wilderness ===
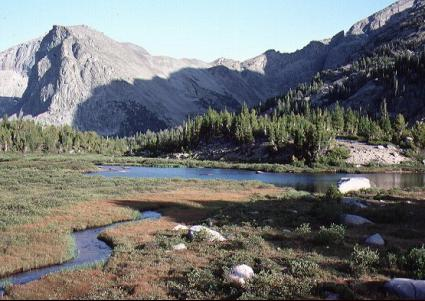
Popo Agie Wilderness

The forest contains four areas of pristine wilderness that have remained largely untouched by human activities such as mining, logging, and road and building construction. The four regions include the North Absaroka, Washakie, Fitzpatrick and Popo Agie Wildernesses. Additionally, a small portion of the Absaroka-Beartooth Wilderness extends into the extreme northwestern part of the forest, along the Montana border. In Shoshone National Forest, 1,400,000 acres (570,000 ha), constituting 56 percent of the forest is designated wilderness. The wilderness designation provides a much higher level of land protection and prohibits any alterations by man to the resource.

The Wilderness Act of 1964 enhanced the protection status of remote and undeveloped land already contained within federally administered protected areas. Passage of the act ensured that no human improvements would take place aside from those already existing. The protected status in wilderness designated zones prohibits road and building construction, oil and mineral exploration or extraction, and logging, and also prohibits the use of motorized equipment, including even bicycles. The only manner in which people can enter wilderness areas is either on foot or horseback. Hunting and fishing are permitted in the wilderness, just as they are throughout the forest, provided those engaging in such activities have the proper licenses and permits.

=== Fire ecology ===
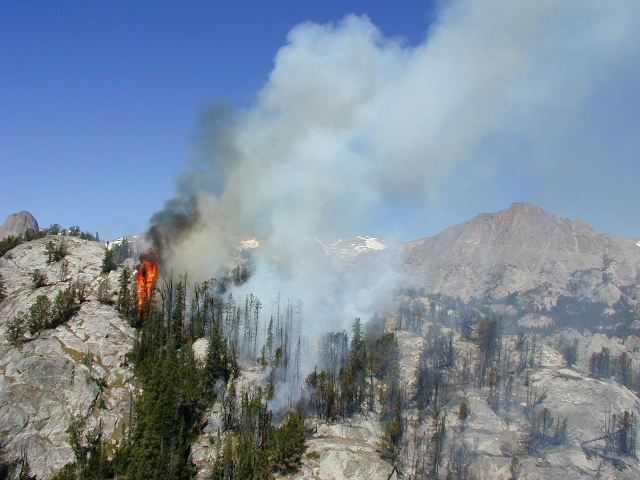
Dinwoody spot fire in 2001

Fire Management officials in Shoshone National Forest recognize that forest fires are a natural part of the ecosystem; however, this was not always the case. 20th century fire fighting efforts, especially in the first half of that century, emphasized quickly extinguishing all fires, as fire was seen as completely detrimental to a forest. In 1935, fire management officials established the 10 am rule for all fires on federal lands, which recommended aggressive attack on fires and to have them controlled by 10 am, the day after they are first detected. This was intended to prevent fires from remaining active into the afternoon when the rising temperatures and more turbulent air caused fires to expand and become more erratic. However, this policy led to an increase in fuels because fires were often extinguished before they had a chance to burn out dead and dying old growth. It was in a stand of old growth fir trees in Shoshone National Forest that the Blackwater fire of 1937 killed 15 fighters during a firestorm 35 mi (56 km) west of Cody, Wyoming. The fire was one of the deadliest in terms of forest firefighter deaths in U.S. history.

Between the years 1970 and 2012, Shoshone National Forest averaged 25 fires annually, of which half were due to natural ignition from lightning, which accounted for 90 percent of the total acreage burned. The remaining acreage that burned was due to campfires that got out of control or from other causes. In Shoshone National Forest, the highest fire incidence is generally in the months of August and September. An average of 2,334 acres (945 ha) burns annually, with the worst year in the past century being 1988, when 194,430 acres (78,680 ha) burned from fires that had spread from the conflagration that engulfed Yellowstone National Park and the surrounding region. After the Yellowstone region fires of 1988, an effort to identify areas of similar fire potential was implemented. Fire managers at Shoshone National Forest work with a number of outside agencies to incorporate fire restrictions, fuels management, and a controlled burn plans to reduce the chances of a catastrophic fire. The dead and dying trees which have been killed by various species of bark beetle may have a great impact on future forest fires. Fire managers have stated the worst time for increased fire activity is 1–2 years after the trees are killed and then again after the trees have fallen many years later.

== Geography and geology ==
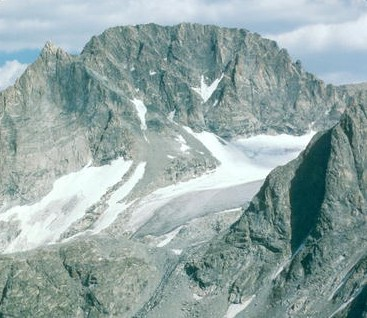
Gannett Peak is the highest mountain in Wyoming and the forest.

Shoshone National Forest borders Yellowstone National Park and Bridger-Teton National Forest to the west. The Continental Divide demarks the boundary between Shoshone and Bridger-Teton National Forests. Along the Montana border, Shoshone National Forest borders Custer National Forest to the north. Private property, property belonging to the state of Wyoming and lands administered by the Bureau of Land Management form the eastern boundaries. Lastly, the Wind River Indian Reservation also borders on the east, and bisects a smaller southern section which includes the Popo Agie Wilderness and the Washakie Ranger District.

The altitude in the forest ranges from 4,600 feet (1,400 m) near Cody, Wyoming, to 13,804 ft (4,207 m) at the top of Gannett Peak, an elevation gain of over 9,200 ft (2,800 m). Of the three major mountain ranges found in the forest, they are geologically distinct from each other. All of the mountains are a part of the Rocky Mountains. In the northern and central portions of the forest lie the Absaroka Range which were named after the Crow Indian tribe. The majority of the Absaroka Range is contained within the forest, with the highest peak being Francs Peak at 13,158 ft (4,011 m). The peaks of the Absaroka are basaltic in origin, having been the result of volcanic activity estimated to have occurred 50 million years ago during the Eocene epoch. The rocks are composed of mostly andesite and breccias deposited for millions of years during volcanic events and are atop more ancient sedimentary rocks that are considered to have economically viable mineral wealth. Gold was mined from the slopes of Francs Peak between the years 1890 and 1915, and the small ghost town of Kirwin remains as a legacy of that period. Major tributaries of the Bighorn River, such as the Shoshone and Greybull Rivers, originate in the Absaroka Range. Important passes through the Absarokas include Sylvan Pass, which leads to the eastern entrance of Yellowstone National Park; and Togwotee Pass, which provides access to Jackson Hole and Grand Teton National Park.

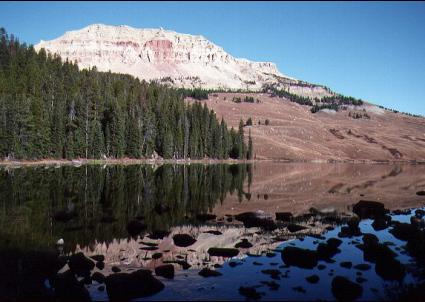
Beartooth Lake

In the far north of Shoshone National Forest a small portion of the Beartooth Mountains are located north of the Clarks Fork of the Yellowstone River. The Beartooths are composed of Precambrian granitic rocks that are amongst the oldest found on Earth. Although often considered a part of the Absaroka Range, the Beartooths are distinct in appearance and geologic history. Uplifted approximately 70 million years ago during the Laramide orogeny, the Beartooths consist of vast windswept plateaus and rugged peaks with sheer cliff faces. The Beartooth Highway (U.S. Highway 212) crosses 10,974-foot (3,340 m) Beartooth Pass, and from there descends to the northeast entrance to Yellowstone National Park.

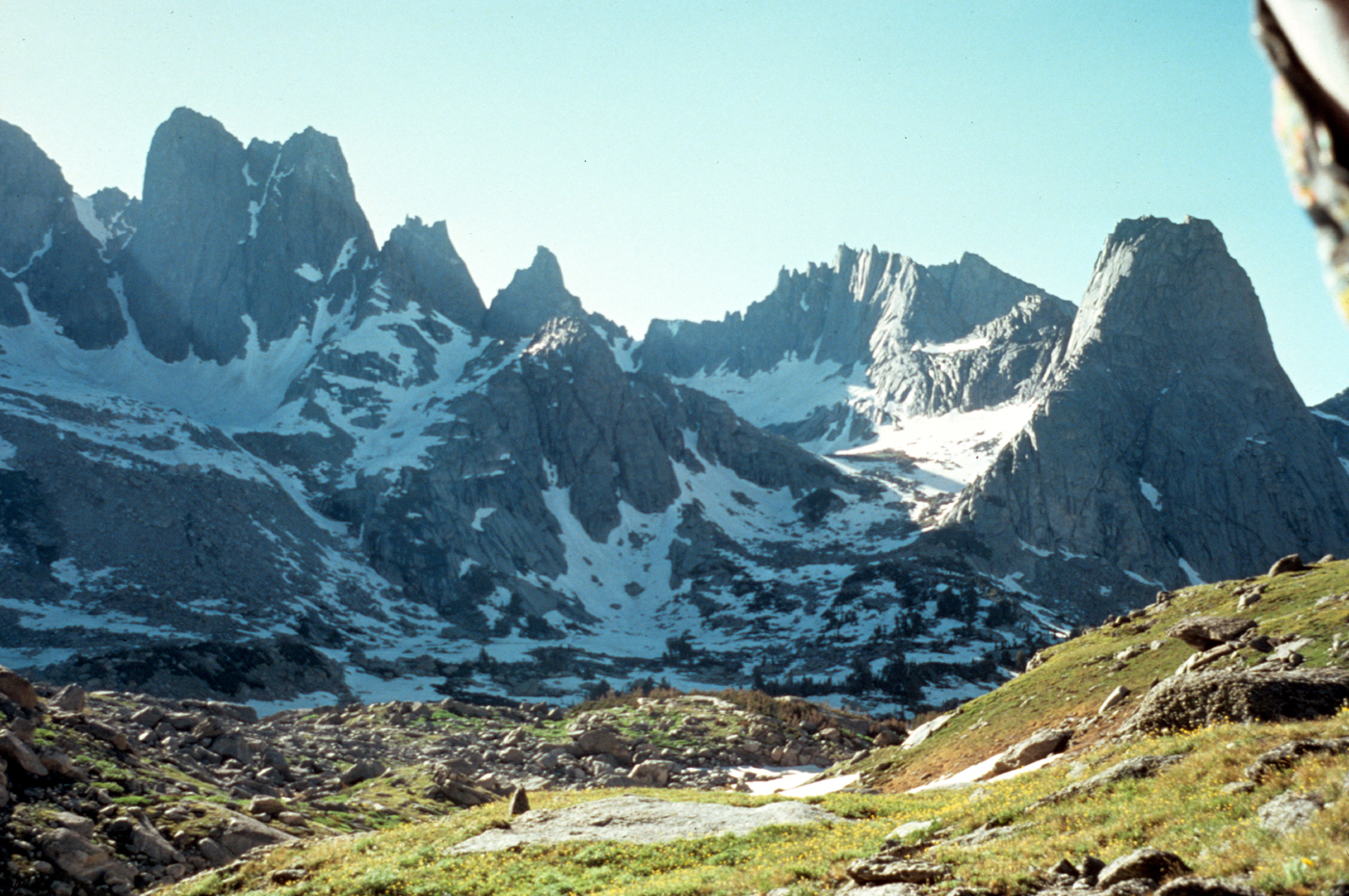
Cirque of the Towers

The Wind River Range is in the southern portion of the forest and is composed primarily of Precambrian granitic rock. Gannett Peak, the tallest mountain in Wyoming, is in the northern part of the range. Altogether eight peaks exceed 13,500 ft (4,100 m) and 119 rise at least 12,000 ft (3,700 m) above sea level. Fremont Peak, the second highest peak in the range, was originally believed to be the tallest mountain in the Rocky Mountains due to its prominence when viewed from the Oregon Trail by early pioneers. The Wind River Range is popular with mountain climbers because of its solid rock and variety of routes. The Cirque of the Towers in the Popo Agie Wilderness is one of the more popular climbing and hiking destinations, and an estimated 200 different climbing routes are located within the peaks that surround the cirque.

There are over 500 lakes in the forest, and 1,000 mi (1,600 km) of streams and rivers. The Clarks Fork of the Yellowstone River is federally designated as a Wild and Scenic River for 22 mi (35 km) through the forest, with cliffs towering up to 2,000 ft (610 m) as the river winds through a gorge. The forest is on the eastern slopes of the Continental Divide, and the rivers flow into the Atlantic Ocean basin.

=== Glaciology ===
According to the U.S. Forest Service, Shoshone National Forest has the greatest number of glaciers of any National Forest in the Rocky Mountains. The forest recreation guide lists 16 named and 140 unnamed glaciers within the forest, all in the Wind River Range. Forty-four of these glaciers are in the Fitzpatrick Wilderness, centered around the highest mountain peaks. However, the state water board for Wyoming lists only 63 glaciers for the entire Wind River Range, which includes glaciers in adjacent Bridger-Teton National Forest. Researchers claim that for most of the period that glaciers have been known to exist in the forest, that they have been in a state of general retreat, with glacial mass losses of as much as 25 percent between the years 1985 and 2009.

Reversing the growth of mid-latitude glaciers that occurred during the Little Ice Age (1350–1850), there has been a worldwide reduction of mountain glacial ice since, with some regions losing as much as 50 percent of their peak ice cover. This can be correlated by examining photographic evidence of glaciers taken over time even with an absence of other means of documentation. The behavior of the glaciers of Shoshone National Forest is consistent with this pattern. In one study of Dinwoody and Gannett Glaciers, during the period from 1958 to 1983, the thickness of these glaciers was reduced 77 and 61 ft (23 and 19 m), respectively.

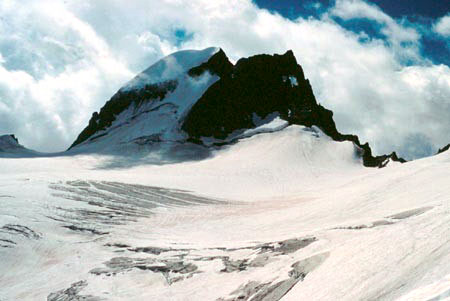
Gannett Glacier on the slopes of Gannett Peak

Gannett Glacier, on the northeast slope of Gannett Peak, is the largest single glacier in the U.S. Rocky Mountains. It has reportedly lost over 50 percent of its volume since 1920 with 25 percent of that occurring between the years 1980 and 1999. Upper Fremont Glacier has been studied more than any other glacier in the Wind River Range. Scientists have obtained ice cores from the Upper Fremont Glacier and found that there have been measurable changes in the atmosphere over the past several hundred years. The Upper Fremont Glacier and the Quelccaya Ice Cap in the Andes of South America both show nearly identical atmospheric records, which indicate a global linkage of atmospheric conditions over time.

The small glaciers in the forest are less able to resist melting than the great ice sheets of Greenland and Antarctica. Once a glacier begins retreating, it may fall into disequilibrium and be unable to find mass balance (accumulation versus melting rate) at any size. Without a favorable climate change, it will continue to retreat until it disappears. Loss of glacial ice already reduces the summer glacial runoff that supplies water to streams and lakes and provides a cold-water source vital to certain fish and plant species. This, in turn, may have a significant impact on the forest ecosystem over time.

== Climate ==
Wyoming is an arid state, averaging 12.68 inches (32.2 cm) of precipitation annually. However, Shoshone National Forest is located in and near some of the largest mountain ranges in the state, and consequently receives anywhere between 15 and 70 in (380 and 1,780 mm) annually. Higher elevations in the forest not only get more precipitation than lower elevations, but also have lower overall temperatures, with summertime highs around 60 °F (16 °C) and lows near 35 °F (2 °C) while lower elevations may be 20 °F (−7 °C) or warmer on average. Humidity levels throughout the forest are low, especially at higher altitudes. In the middle of the forest at the Wapiti Ranger Station, which is 30 mi (48 km) west of the forest headquarters in Cody, Wyoming, January high and low temperatures are 35.8 and 13.2 °F (2.1 and −10.4 °C), while the July highs and lows are 81.4 and 49.1 °F (27.4 and 9.5 °C). The annual precipitation at Wapiti is 10.37 in (263 mm).

Most of the precipitation falls in the winter and early spring, while summer is punctuated with widely scattered thunderstorms. The autumn is usually cool and dry. Due to the altitude and dryness of the atmosphere, vigorous radiative cooling occurs throughout the year, and exceptional daily temperature variances are not uncommon. Consequently, the nights range from very cool in the summer to extremely cold in the winter; therefore, visitors should always remember to bring along at least a jacket, even during the summer. Records indicate that the highest temperature ever recorded in the forest was 100 °F (38 °C) in 1978, while the coldest was −49 °F (−45 °C) in 1972.

== Recreation ==
Shoshone National Forest receives an average of over half a million visitors a year. Two visitor centers provide orientation, books, maps, and interpretive displays. One visitor center is at the Wapiti Wayside on the Buffalo Bill Cody Scenic Byway, west of Cody, Wyoming and adjacent to the historic Wapiti Ranger Station while the other visitor center is to the south in Lander, Wyoming. There are 30 vehicle access campgrounds in the forest, with up to 54 individual sites per campground. Approximately half of these campgrounds provide running water and restroom facilities and also provide for handicapped accessibility. Referred to as "front country" campgrounds, they also permit recreational vehicle access in most cases. All of the campgrounds are on a first come, first served basis although four campgrounds have sites that can be reserved in advance by contacting the National Reservation Service. Due to the presence of grizzly bears, a few of the campgrounds require what is referred to as "hard-sided" camping only, and tent camping is not permitted.

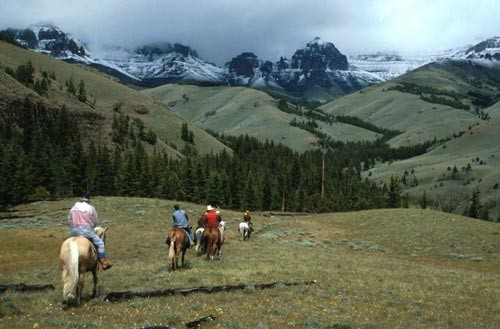
Horseback riding in Greybull Ranger District

For some visitors the greater solitude of the backcountry requires using hiking trails to backpacking or horseback riding into more remote destinations such as Blackwater Natural Bridge which can be accessed from Blackwater Natural Bridge trailhead. There are dozens of trails which total over 1,600 mi (2,600 km) located throughout the forest. Many of the trailheads can be accessed at campgrounds, with shorter day hikes available as well. The Continental Divide Trail has a 20-mile (32 km) section which passes through the forest and crosses the Continental Divide at Sheridan Pass. There is also the Nez Perce National Historic Trail and the Beartooth Loop National Recreation Trail, both of which are in the northern regions of the forest. Some remote areas can also be accessed by horseback. Trailheads usually provide enough room for horse and pack animal trailers plus personal vehicles. Along forest access roads, all-terrain vehicles (ATV) are allowed, but since wilderness areas do not permit access by way of motorized transport, those who wish to visit such areas usually do so either by hiking in or on horseback.

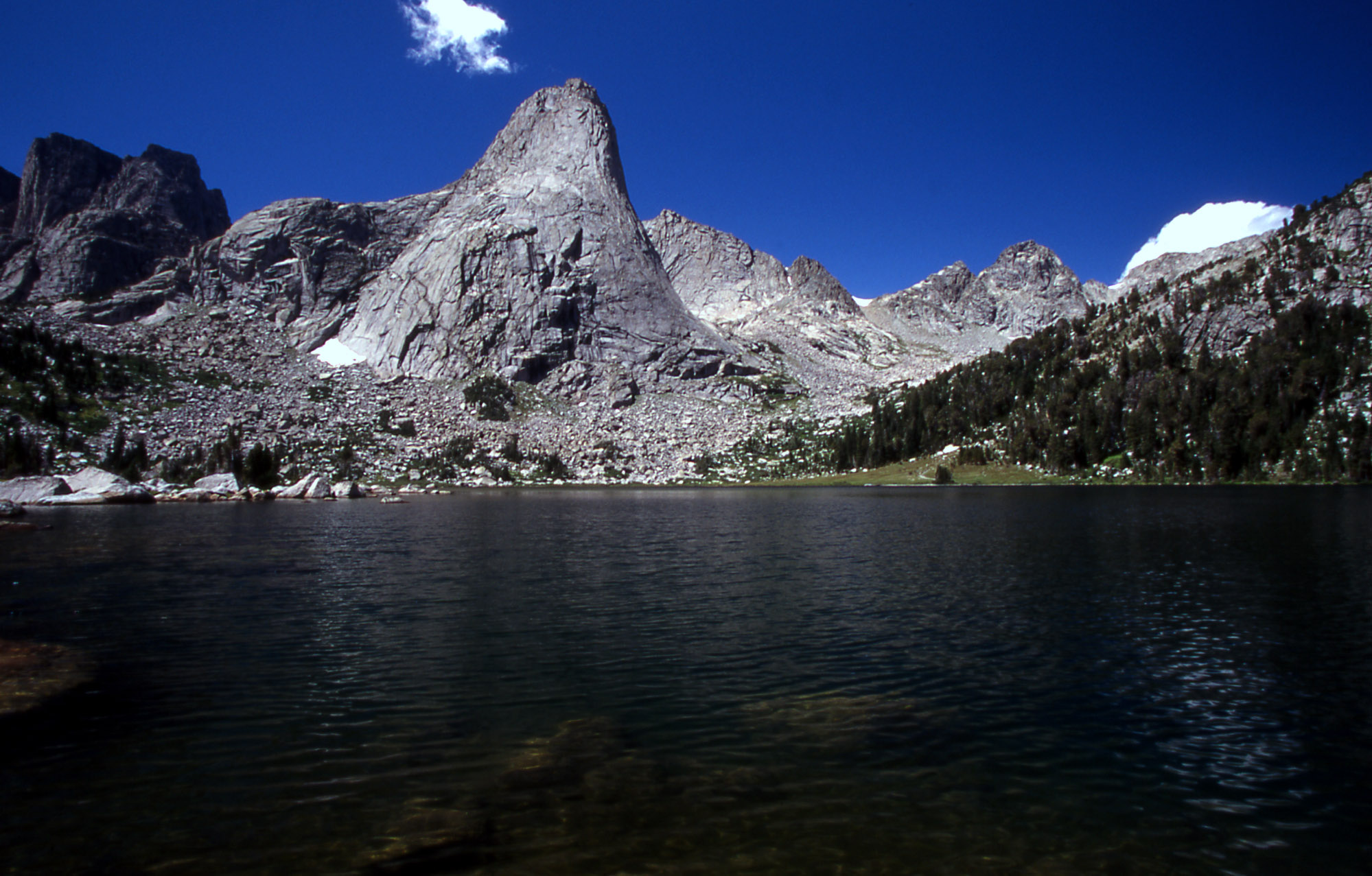
Pingora Peak rises above Lonesome Lake in the Popo Agie Wilderness. Pingora is one of many peaks located in the Cirque of the Towers.

Hunting and fishing are popular recreational activities permitted throughout the forest. Many of the streams and rivers are "Blue Ribbon Trout Streams". Though many streams and lakes have excellent opportunities to catch various species of trout, the north and south forks of the Shoshone River, the Greybull River and the Clark's Fork of the Yellowstone, the only federally designated Wild and Scenic River in Wyoming, are a few of the better locations to reign in a trophy level Rainbow or Yellowstone cutthroat trout. 1,000 miles (1,600 km) of streams and a hundred lakes that can be legally fished from provide plenty of elbow room during even the most crowded of fishing seasons. Hunting and fishing licenses are sponsored by the state of Wyoming and are available through the Wyoming Game and Fish Department.

The southern section of the forest in the Wind River Range is the primary destination for mountain climbers. Nine of the highest 10 peaks in Wyoming are here, and the mountains are primarily of granitic rock with countless cliffs and sheer rock walls. The Cirque of the Towers is particularly popular as it has numerous peaks within a relatively short distance of each other. Two particular climbs on the peaks in the cirque are considered amongst the finest climbing adventures available in the U.S. The Absaroka Range also attracts climbers but not of a technical nature since the rocks are not considered solid enough for good anchoring points. For the tallest peaks in the Wind River Range, the entire summiting effort will take even experienced climbers many days due to the inaccessibility of the region and complexity of the climbing effort.

Winter activities include cross-country skiing and snowmobiling, with 48 mi (77 km) of groomed trails for cross-country skiing and over 300 mi (480 km) for use by snowmobilers. The region around Togwotee Pass allows snowmobilers easy access from paved roads and has snow depths of between 6 and 10 ft (1.8 and 3.0 m) annually at elevations of 8,000 to 10,000 ft (2,400 to 3,000 m), which equates to a long season for winter activities.

=== Scenic roads ===
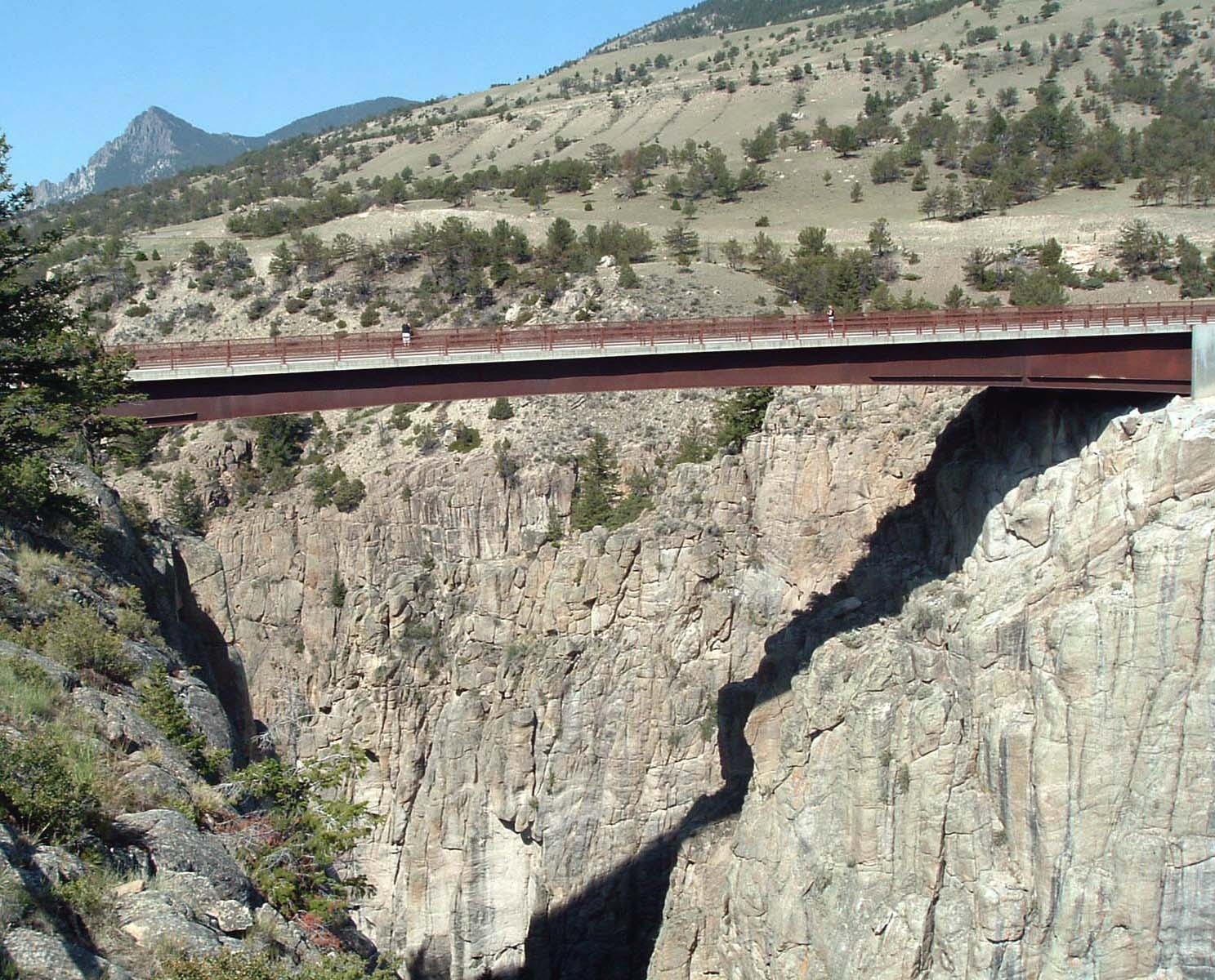
Sunlight Bridge on the Chief Joseph Scenic Byway

Shoshone National Forest forms the eastern boundary of Yellowstone National Park and the northeastern and eastern entrances to the park are both accessed by way of designated scenic roadways. A federally designated National Scenic Byways All-American Road, the Beartooth Highway (U.S. Highway 212), weaves through the forest and serves as the northeastern entranceway to Yellowstone National Park. Chief Joseph Scenic Byway (Wyoming Highway 296) connects Cody, Wyoming with the Beartooth Highway and follows the old trail in which Chief Joseph and the Nez Perce tribe attempted to flee the U.S. Cavalry in 1877. South of there, Buffalo Bill Cody Scenic Byway (US 14/16/20) heads west from Cody, Wyoming, passes through the forest and crosses Sylvan Pass as it enters Yellowstone. Lastly, the Wyoming Centennial Scenic Byway (US 26/287) heads northwest from Dubois, Wyoming, over Togwotee Pass and enters Jackson Hole and Grand Teton National Park. Though the Beartooth Highway is the only one of these four roads that is a National Scenic Byway, all four of them have been designated Wyoming State Scenic Byways by the state of Wyoming.

== Hazards ==
Encountering bears is a concern in the Wind River Range. There are other concerns as well, including bugs, wildfires, adverse snow conditions and nighttime cold temperatures.

Importantly, there have been notable incidents, including accidental deaths, due to falls from steep cliffs (a misstep could be fatal in this class 4/5 terrain) and due to falling rocks, over the years, including 1993, 2007 (involving an experienced NOLS leader), 2015 and 2018. Other incidents include a seriously injured backpacker being airlifted near SquareTop Mountain in 2005, and a fatal hiker incident (from an apparent accidental fall) in 2006 that involved state search and rescue. The U.S. Forest Service does not offer updated aggregated records on the official number of fatalities in the Wind River Range.

== Popular culture ==
Shoshone National Forest is the setting of the 2016 first-person adventure video game Firewatch.

== See also ==
- List of national forests of the United States
- Tie Hack Historical Monument

== Works cited ==
=== Books ===
- Adkison, Ron (June 1, 1996). Hiking Wyoming's Wind River Range. Falcon Guides. ISBN 978-1-56044-402-2.
- Capace, Nancy (2007). Encyclopedia of Wyoming. Somerset Publishers, Inc. ISBN 978-0403096138.
- Cooper, Ed (November 25, 2008). Soul of the Rockies: Portraits of America's Largest Mountain Range. Falcon Guides. ISBN 978-0-7627-4941-6.
- Dow, Fred; Dow, Suzanne (2001). U.S. National Forest Campground Guide Rocky Mountain Region. Authorhouse. ISBN 978-0-7596-3023-9.
- Enright, Kelly (1992). America's Natural Places: Rocky Mountains and Great Plains. Greenwood. ISBN 978-0-313-35315-4.
- Hebard, Grace R. (1995). Washakie, Chief of the Shoshones. Bison Books. ISBN 978-0803272781.
- Hunger, Bill (2008). Hiking Wyoming: 110 of the State's Best Hiking Adventures. Falcon Guides. ISBN 978-0-7627-3420-7.
- Johansen, Bruce E.; Pritzker, Barry M. (July 23, 2007). Encyclopedia of American Indian History. ABC-CLIO. ISBN 978-1851098187.
- Kelsey, Joe (July 16, 2013). Climbing and Hiking in the Wind River Mountains. Falcon Guides. ISBN 978-0-7627-8078-5.
- Larson, T.A. (March 1, 1981). Wyoming: A Guide to Its History, Highways, and People. University of Nebraska Press. ISBN 978-0-8032-6854-8.
- McCoy, Michael (2007). Wyoming Off the Beaten Path: A Guide to Unique Places. GPP Travel. ISBN 978-0762744312.
- Miller, Char (2013). Atlas of US and Canadian Environmental History. Routledge. ISBN 978-1-136-75524-8.
- Omi, Phillip N. (May 23, 2005). "Institutionalization of Fire Exclusion". Forest Fires: A Reference Handbook. ABC-CLIO. ISBN 978-1-85109-438-7.
- Otis, Alison T. (1986). The Forest Service and the Civilian Conservation Corps, 1933–42. U.S. Forest Service. ISBN 978-1-236-20500-1.
- Reef, Catherine (2010). African Americans in the Military. Facts on File, Incorporated. ISBN 978-0-8160-7839-4.
- Retallic, Ken (February 1, 2012). Flyfisher's Guide to Wyoming: Including Grand Teton and Yellowstone National Parks. Wilderness Adventures Press. ISBN 978-1-932098-10-5.
- Roper, Steve; Steck, Allen (1979). Fifty Classic Climbs of North America. Sierra Club Books. ISBN 0-87156-292-8.
- Steen, Harold K. (1976). The U.S. Forest Service: A History (1 ed.). University of Washington Press. ISBN 0-295-95523-6.
- Utley, Robert M. (2004). After Lewis and Clark: Mountain Men and the Paths to the Pacific. Bison Books. ISBN 978-0-8032-9564-3.
- Van Kranendonk, Martin J.; Smithies, R. Hugh; Bennett, Vickie, eds. (October 26, 2007). Earth's Oldest Rocks. Elsevier Science. ISBN 978-0-08-055247-7.
- Wuerthner, George (1992). "Flora". Yellowstone: A Visitor's Companion (1 ed.). Stackpole Books. ISBN 978-0-8117-3078-5.

=== Journals ===
- Antweiler, John C.; Bieniewski, Carl L. (1984). "Northern part of the Washakie Wilderness and Nearby Roadless Areas, Wyoming". U.S. Geological Survey Professional Paper. 2 (1300). U.S. Geological Survey: 1272–1275. Archived from the original on March 3, 2024.
- Aplet, Gregory H. (April 2006). "Evolution of Wilderness Fire Policy" (PDF). International Journal of Wilderness. 12 (1): 9–13. Archived from the original (PDF) on February 28, 2008.
- Hall, Myrna; Fagre, Daniel (February 2003). "Modeled Climate-Induced glacier change in Glacier National Park, 1850–2100". BioScience. 53 (2): 131. doi:10.1641/0006-3568(2003)053[0131:MCIGCI]2.0.CO;2.
- Williams, Gerald W. (2005). The USDA Forest Service—The First Century (PDF) (Report). United States Department of Agriculture.
