= Buffalo Bill State Park =

State Park in Park County, Wyoming

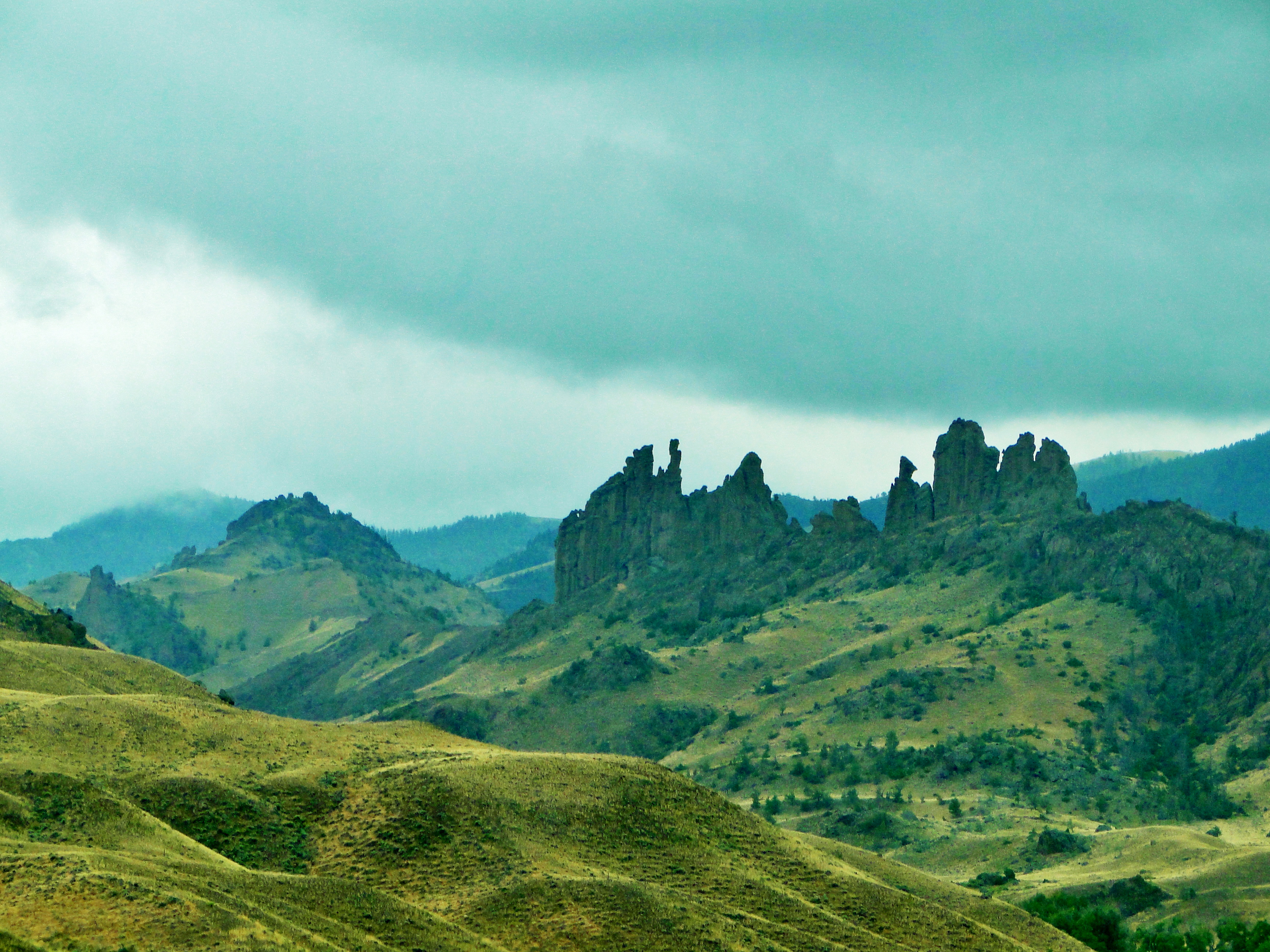
- Shoshone Canyon

- Location within Wyoming
- Interactive map of Buffalo Bill State Park
- Location: Park County, Wyoming, United States
- Coordinates: 44°29′26″N 109°14′4″W
- Area: 10,276 acres (4,159 ha)
- Elevation: 5,374 ft (1,638 m)
- Established: 1957
- Administrator: Wyoming State Parks, Historic Sites & Trails
- Designation: Wyoming state park
- Named for: Buffalo Bill Cody
- Website: Official website

Buffalo Bill State Park is a public recreation area surrounding the reservoir formed by the Buffalo Bill Dam, an impoundment of the Shoshone River, in Park County, Wyoming. The state park, reservoir and dam were named after William "Buffalo Bill" Cody, who founded the nearby town of Cody and who owned much of the land now occupied by the reservoir and park. The park offers camping, hiking, boating, fishing, and picnicking and is managed by Wyoming Division of State Parks and Historic Sites.

== History ==
Buffalo Bill Cody was one of the most colorful figures of the American Old West, mostly known for the shows he organized with cowboy themes. He once owned some of the land that is now part of the state park bearing his name. He sold his property to the United States government prior to the construction of Buffalo Bill Dam. Cody settled in the Shoshone Canyon area in the 1870s. He first came to the region as a guide for a survey expedition. Cody spent parts the next twenty years in the area serving as a hunting guide. Buffalo Bill worked to bring irrigation and agriculture development in Park County. He founded the nearby city of Cody in 1896.

Construction on Buffalo Bill Dam, originally known as Shoshone Dam, began in 1905. Upon completion, in 1910, the dam was the highest in the world standing at 325 feet (99 m). The dam is a concrete arch structure of constant radius. It was part of the Shoshone Project, one of the first projects overseen by the Bureau of Reclamation.

In addition to providing water for irrigation and downstream flood control, Buffalo Bill Dam provides hydropower for a power plant. The first and second units of the power plant were constructed in 1922. A third unit was built in 1931. Units one and two were decommissioned in 1980 and unit three was replaced in 1991.

The park was established in 1957 and rebuilt in 1993 after an eight-year project to increase the height of the dam by 25 feet (7.6 m). The original park facilities were flooded when the dam was raised and the reservoir was deepened and widened. The project added 260,000 acre-feet (320,000,000 m^{3}) to the area of the lake. A visitors center at the dam was opened upon completion of the heightening of the dam. Further modifications to the dam included an expansion of the underground spillway and addition of gates to the spillway for flow control.

The park's picnicking facilities and fencing were improved in 2007 by the Wyoming Conservation Corps.

== Geology ==
The park occupies the Shoshone Canyon portion of the Shoshone River in the Rocky Mountains of northwestern Wyoming. The area is part of the Absaroka Range, which includes Rattlesnake Mountain, Cedar Mountain (also known as Spirit Mountain), Logan Mountain, Sheep Mountain, and Carter Mountain.

== Activities and amenities ==
Recreational activities at the park include fishing, boating, hiking, camping and picnicking.
