= Cedar Mountain (Wyoming) =

Ridge in Park County, Wyoming, United States

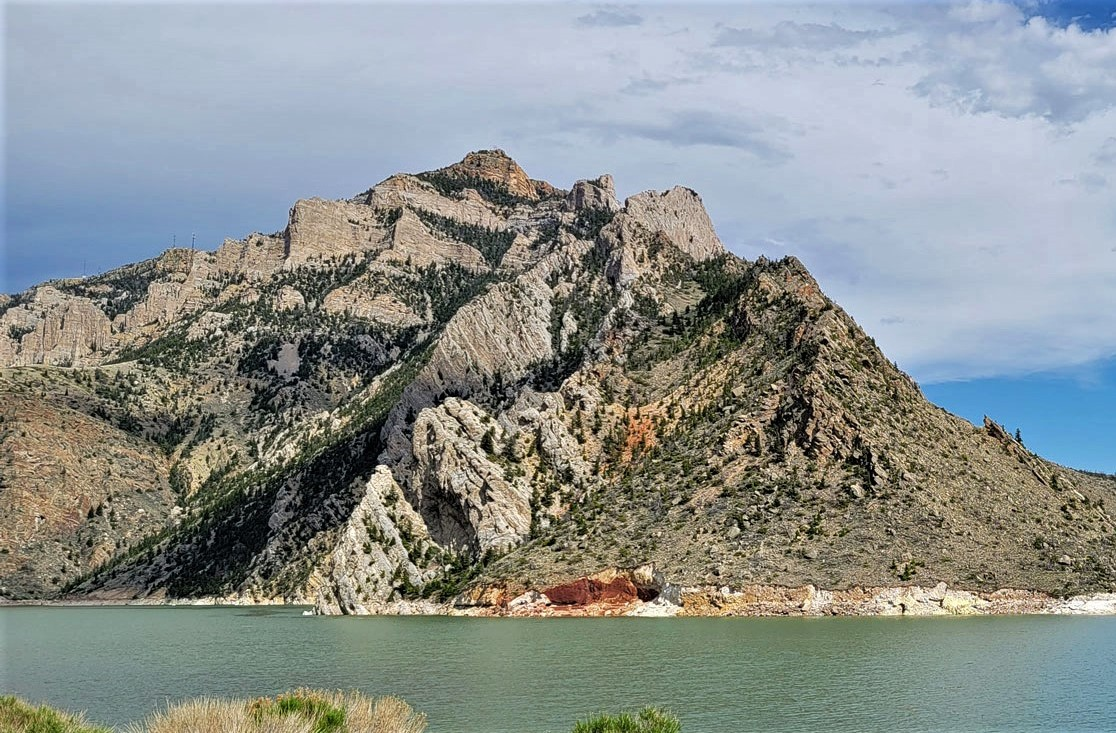
- West aspect

Highest point
- Elevation: 7,880 ft (2,400 m)
- Prominence: 2,460 ft (750 m)
- Parent peak: Rattlesnake Mountain
- Isolation: 4.97 mi (8.00 km)
- Coordinates: 44°29′42″N 109°09′45″W

Geography
- Location within Wyoming Location within the United States
- Location: Park County, Wyoming, U.S.
- Parent range: Absaroka Range; Rocky Mountains
- Topo map: USGS Irma Flats

Geology
- Rock type: volcanic breccia

Climbing
- Easiest route: class 1 hiking

Cedar Mountain, also known as Spirit Mountain, is a prominent 7,880-foot-elevation (2,400-meter) summit located in Park County, Wyoming, United States.

== Description ==
The peak is situated immediately west of the town of Cody. It is set in the Absaroka Range at the western edge of the Bighorn Basin. Topographic relief is significant as the west aspect rises 2,500 feet (760 meters) above Buffalo Bill Reservoir in one mile. The Cedar Mountain name has been officially adopted by the United States Board on Geographic Names.

== Buffalo Bill ==
Buffalo Bill was a world-famous resident and founder of Cody, and in his 1906 will requested to be buried on Cedar Mountain, with a buffalo monument marking the spot and overlooking the town. He was in Denver when he died in 1917. In a subsequent 1913 will, he left his burial arrangements to his wife. She accepted a monetary offer from the city of Denver and Denver Post newspaper to have him buried in the Denver area to serve as a tourist attraction. She said he wanted to be buried on Lookout Mountain, in Golden, Colorado, west of Denver, which was corroborated by their daughter Irma, Cody's sisters, and family friends. But other family members joined the people of Cody in saying that he should be buried in the town he founded. A story has it that the enraged people of Cody spirited away his body from the Denver mortuary in an elaborate ruse, and buried him on Cedar Mountain. Whether or not he is secretly buried on Cedar Mountain, a buffalo monument is erected there.

== Climate ==
According to the Köppen climate classification system, Cedar Mountain is located in a semi-arid climate zone with cold, snowy winters, and cool to warm summers. Precipitation runoff from the mountain drains into the Shoshone River.

== Gallery ==
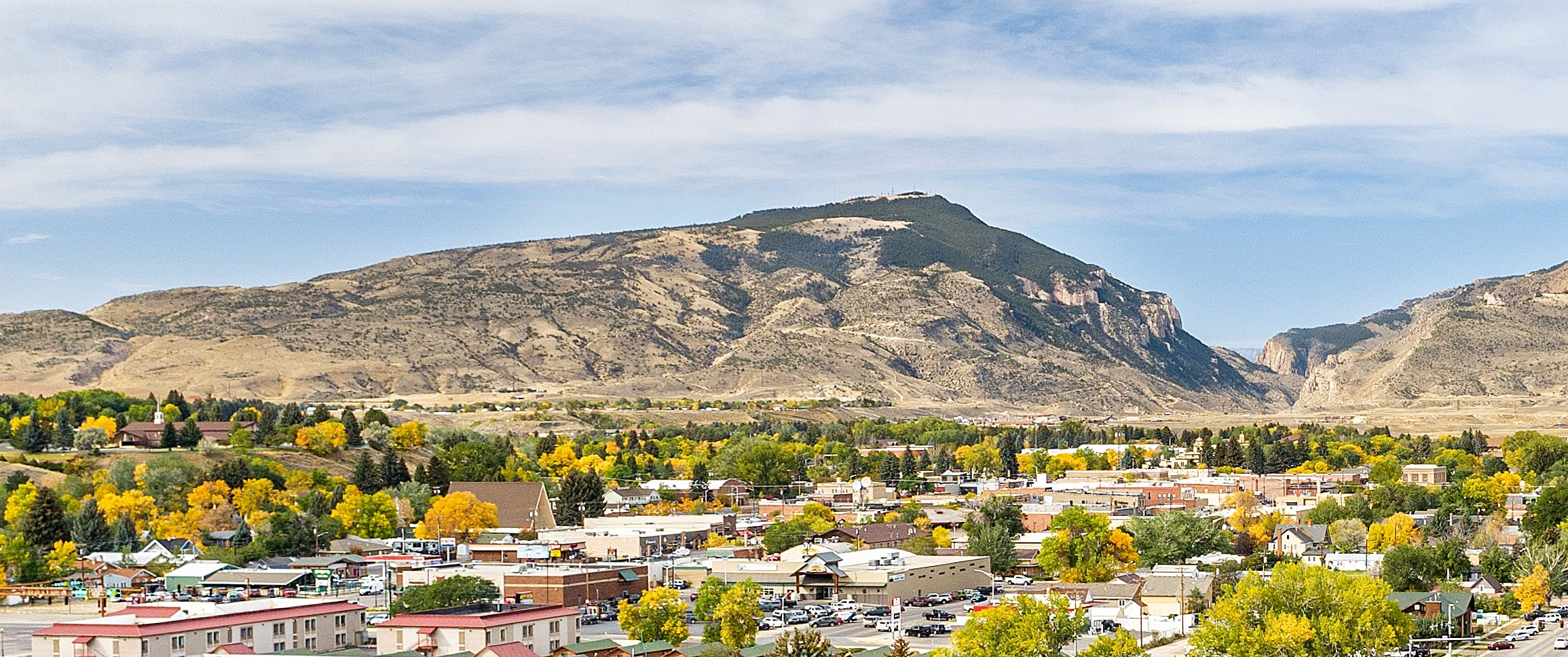
Cedar Mountain seen from Cody, Wyoming

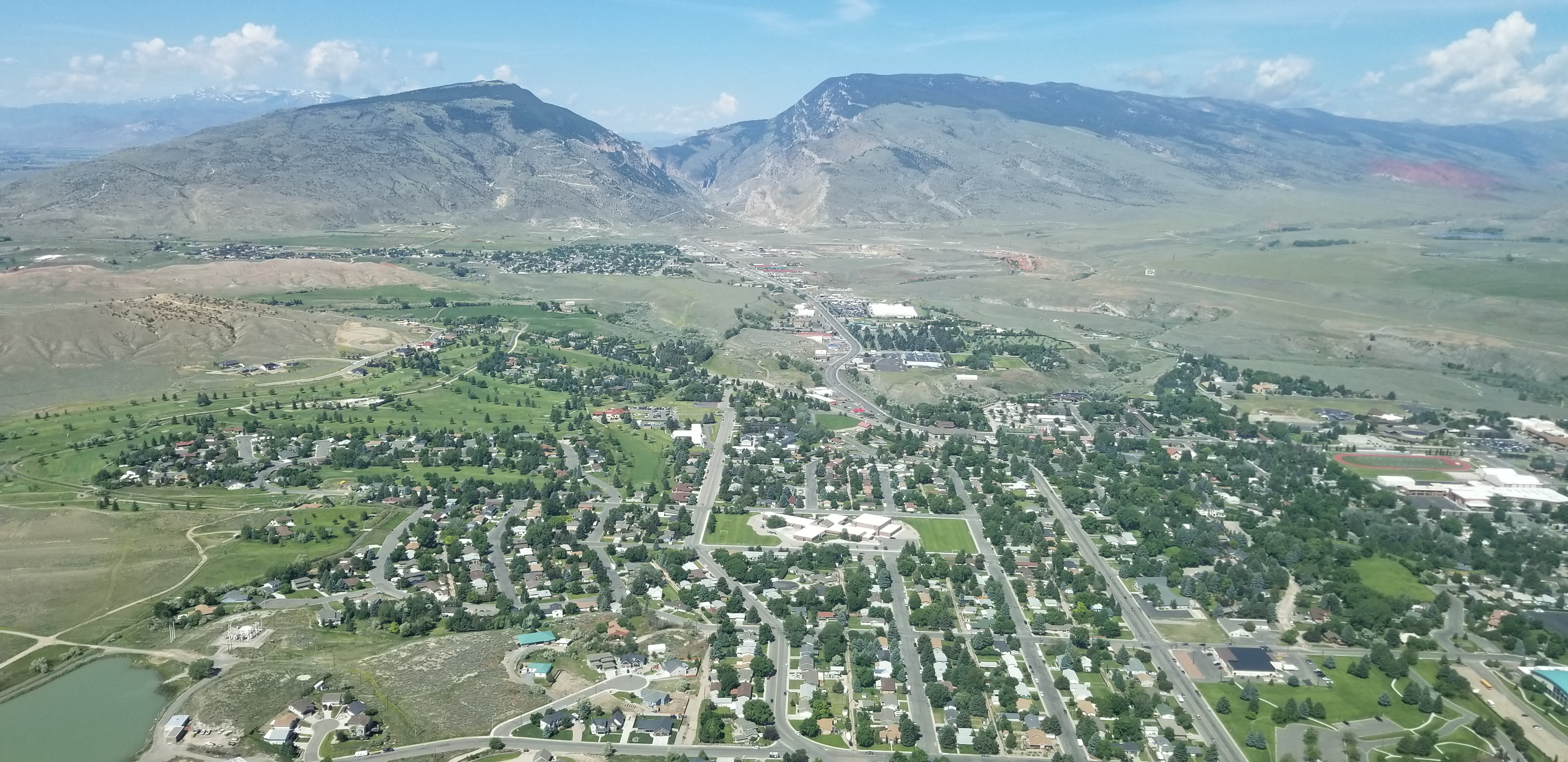
Cody, Cedar Mountain (left), Rattlesnake Mountain (right)

== See also ==
- List of mountain peaks of Wyoming
