= William John Sinclair =

American paleontologist

William John Sinclair (1877–1935) was a geologist and vertebrate paleontologist, noteworthy for his collaboration with Walter W. Granger on stratigraphy in New Mexico and Wyoming.

Sinclair received in 1904 his M.S. and Ph.D. from U. C. Berkeley, where John C. Merriam was his doctoral supervisor. After receiving his Ph.D., Sinclair went to Princeton University as a Teaching Fellow and was promoted in 1905 to Instructor in Geology, in 1916 to Assistant Professor, in 1928 to Associate Professor, and in 1930 to Professor.

Granger's early collaboration with Princeton geologist and paleontologist William J. Sinclair produced a series of detailed and perceptive stratigraphic contributions. This research, published primarily in the years 1911–1914, established the first mammalian biostratigraphy of the Paleocene-early Eocene of the San Juan Basin, New Mexico and of the Eocene of the Bighorn and Wind River basins in Wyoming.

In 1920 he started a major study of the fossils and geology of the lowest beds of the Brule Formation in the Badlands, then called the red layer. Sinclair was not only an excellent vertebrate paleontologist but also an excellent geologist. Sinclair (1923) was one of the first to consider the detailed origin of the White River bone beds on the basis of the lithographic content and postmortem (taphonomic) features of the fossil bones. He carefully recorded the vertical positions of the fossils within the lower Brule Formation and documented changes in the fauna.

Sinclair was a protégé of William B. Scott and secured funding for Princeton's William Berryman Scott Fund for research in vertebrate paleontology. Sinclair willed his large petroleum-derived estate to establish Princeton's Sinclair Professorship of Vertebrate Paleontology. The first holder of this professorship was Glenn Lowell Jepsen (1903–1974).

== See also ==
- Bighorn Basin Dinosaur Project
