= Mummy Cave Ancestor =

Indigenous man whose mummified remains were found in Wyoming

- Born: Unknown
- Died: Unknown; sheep hide wrapping radiocarbon-dated to 720 ± 110 CE (uncalibrated); Unknown
- Body discovered: July 1963; Mummy Cave, Wyoming, United States
- Other names: The Ancestor; formerly "Mummy Joe"
- Known for: Naturally preserved remains of an Indigenous man, approximately 35–40 years old at death
- Height: 165 cm (5 ft 5 in)

The Mummy Cave Ancestor is an Indigenous man whose partially mummified remains were discovered in July 1963 at Mummy Cave, a rock shelter in northwestern Wyoming. He was approximately 35–40 years old when he died. His body had been wrapped in a sheep hide robe and placed beneath a cairn of stones. The shelter's dry conditions preserved parts of his skin and hair, as well as the wrapping. Radiocarbon analysis of the robe yielded an uncalibrated date of 720 ± 110 CE, although this does not establish a precise calendar date for his death.

Examination of his remains provided evidence about his health, food and clothing. Preserved intestinal material contained plant foods and whipworm eggs, while the robe retained sinew stitching and traces of red ochre. Little soft tissue survived, and his cause of death remains unknown. After excavation, his remains were displayed at the Buffalo Bill Historical Center in Cody. They had been withdrawn from display by 1988 out of respect for American Indian religious beliefs. Although older accounts called him "Mummy Joe", the museum's archival description records a preference among tribal members for "The Ancestor".

In 2006, the Shoshone National Forest formally determined that the Ancestor was culturally affiliated with the Eastern Shoshone and Shoshone-Bannock tribes under the Native American Graves Protection and Repatriation Act. Subsequent notices in 2022 and 2024 identified additional funerary objects eligible for return, including items recognized following a re-examination by Eastern Shoshone tribal members. These notices set out procedures for repatriation but do not confirm that the Ancestor and the associated objects have been returned.

== Site ==
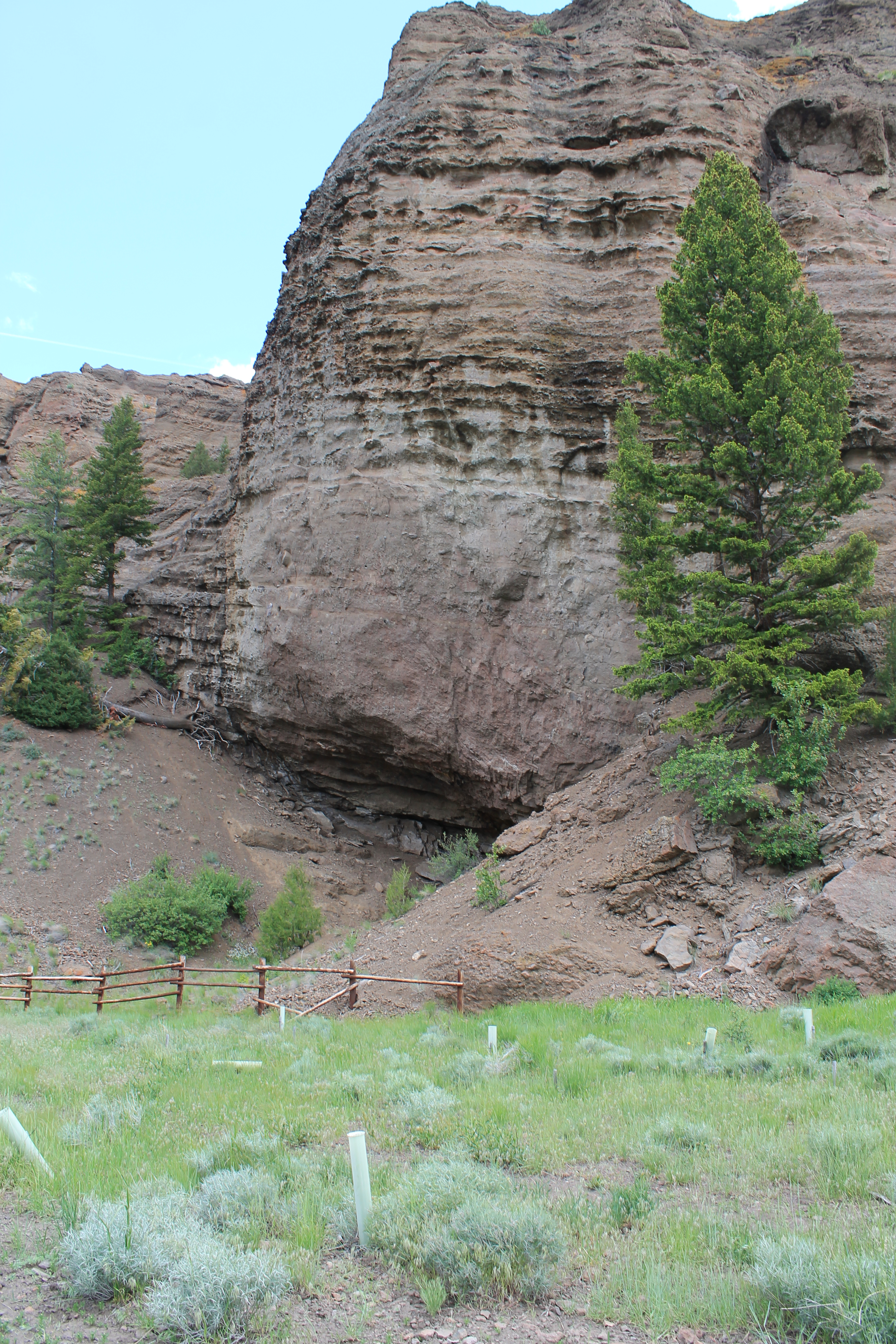
Mummy Cave lies beneath a volcanic cliff in northwestern Wyoming.

Mummy Cave is a rock shelter beside the North Fork of the Shoshone River in Park County, northwestern Wyoming. It lies within Shoshone National Forest, about 19 kilometres (12 mi) east of Yellowstone National Park, at an elevation of approximately 1,920 metres (6,300 ft). Despite its name, the shelter is a broad, shallow recess beneath a volcanic cliff. It measures approximately 46 metres (151 ft) across and extends about 12 metres (39 ft) into the cliff. The surrounding rock consists of hardened volcanic ash mixed with larger fragments of volcanic material. Geologist John H. Moss concluded that the Shoshone River had carved the recess before changing course away from the cliff. Rock fragments and sediment subsequently accumulated within the shelter, preserving successive layers of human activity.

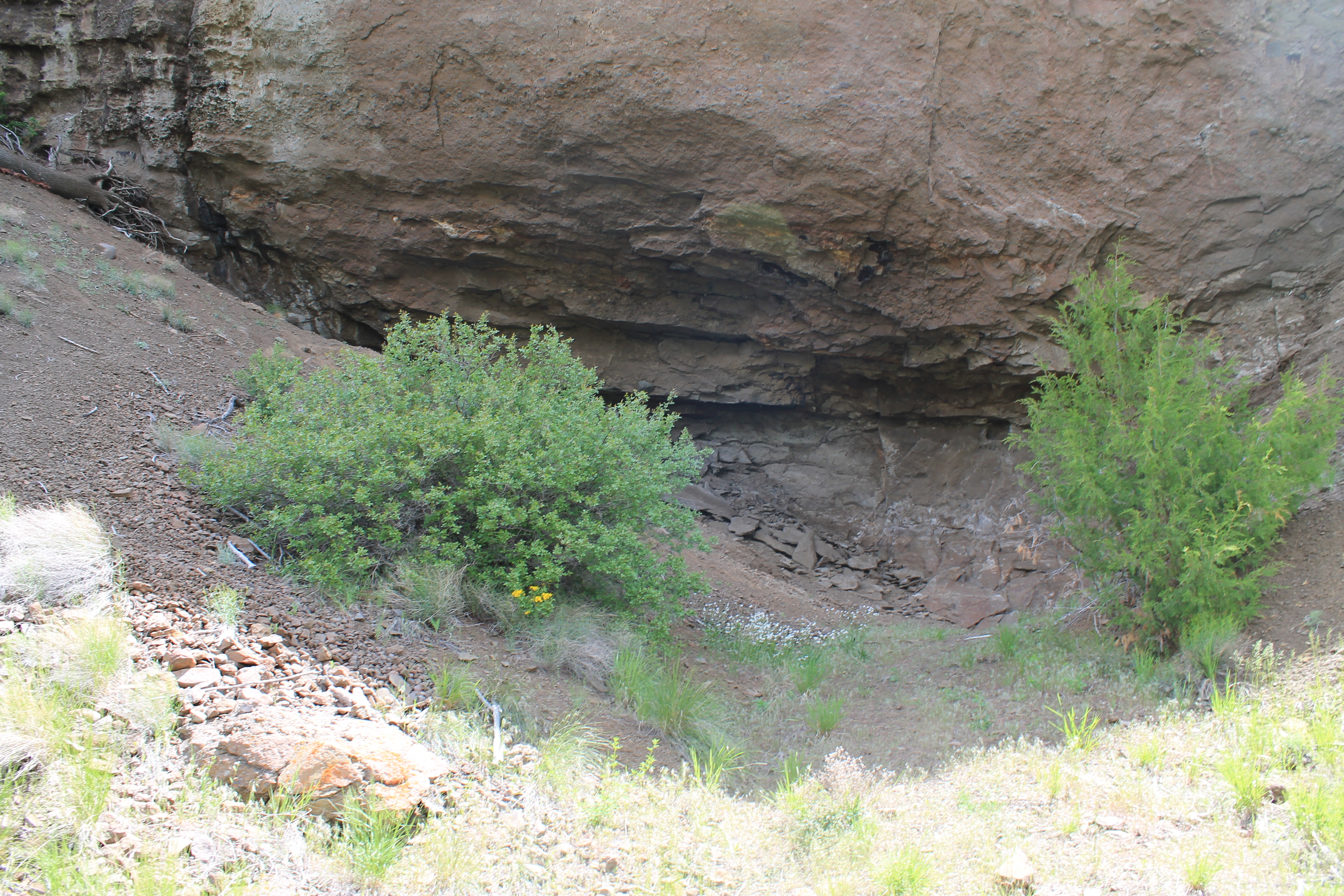
A closer view of Mummy Cave's shallow overhang and sheltered floor.

The shelter is unusually dry. The rock above it allows little water to pass through and lacks vertical cracks through which rain or meltwater could seep. The narrow ridge above also provides little space for rain or snow to collect. These conditions preserved fragile materials, including hide, wood and feathers, that ordinarily decay at archaeological sites.

Archaeologists identified 38 cultural layers, recording repeated use of the shelter over thousands of years. The Wyoming State Historic Preservation Office reports radiocarbon dates ranging from approximately 7280 BCE to 1580 CE. The layers contain evidence of activities such as making stone tools, preparing food and maintaining hearths, providing a long record of human use of the mountain environment.

== Discovery ==
The individual now known as the Ancestor was discovered in late July 1963 during excavations led by Robert Edgar, a local amateur archaeologist, under the direction of Harold McCracken, director of the Buffalo Bill Historical Center in Cody, Wyoming. The discovery came during the first summer of a four-season investigation of the shelter.

Earlier relic hunters had dug a pit approximately 76 centimetres (2.49 ft) deep near the shelter wall, in what proved to be one of the excavation's richest areas. They apparently stopped when they encountered stones covering the burial. After screening the soil left by these diggers, the excavation team enlarged and deepened the pit. Edgar's account describes stones that initially appeared to have fallen from the wall or ceiling. Removing some exposed part of a tanned mountain sheep hide robe, followed by a human foot.

The Ancestor lay on his right side with his legs bent, facing the shelter wall and with his head pointing west. His burial was near the bottom of cultural layer 36, and material from later use of the shelter had accumulated against and over its covering stones. The excavation report records no visible outline of a grave pit. Wilfred M. Husted, who later prepared the report with Edgar, suggested that the stones had discouraged the relic hunters and protected the burial from disturbance.

== Condition ==
The Ancestor's body was partially mummified, having dried naturally in the shelter's unusually dry conditions. His hair survived, cut to approximately 8 centimetres (3.1 in) at the front and left considerably longer at the back.

Preservation was uneven. Archaeologist Susan Hughes's 1988 account of a specialist examination reported that little soft tissue remained, limiting the researchers' ability to establish his cause of death.

Accounts differ concerning the condition of his bones. Edgar's description, reproduced in the excavation report, recorded a broken wrist joint without establishing when the break occurred. Hughes's later account reported that the examination found no skeletal abnormalities or injuries. Neither account establishes a cause of death.

== Clothing and personal adornment ==
The Ancestor was wrapped in a robe or blanket made from mountain sheep hide, sewn together with sinew, or animal tendon. His hands and feet were bare. Hughes described the wrapping more specifically as pieces of sheepskin joined with an overhand stitch and stained with red ochre, an earthy pigment.

A cord survived in his hair. The excavation report suggested that it had held back the longer hair at the rear of his head. Hughes identified it as twisted bark cord, possibly made from cottonwood.

The accounts differ in their descriptions of his ear ornaments. Edgar recorded an ornament beside the left ear, made from feathers and strips of fur twisted together, with its ends joined into a coil. Hughes described two rabbitskin ornaments placed over the ears.

According to the Wyoming State Historic Preservation Office, the clothing and other items found with him were interpreted as evidence that he held high status within his community.

== Grave goods ==
In February 2006, the Ancestor's mountain sheep hide wrapping was the only item formally identified as an associated funerary object, meaning an object believed to have been placed with or near him as part of a death rite or ceremony.

A corrected inventory published in July 2022 expanded that designation to 44 objects or groups of objects. Following re-examination, it included all items recovered from his burial layer, identified as level 3 or cultural level 36. Many entries were lots of fragments or materials, rather than individual, complete objects. The notice did not specify each item's position relative to his body or identify which he had worn or carried.

These materials included a strung bow, arrow shafts wrapped in sinew, moccasin fragments, grass moccasin liners, sewn hides, basketry, feathers, cordage and netting. Other entries included worked bone, horn, antler and wood; animal and fish remains; shell, seeds, pigment and calcite crystals. Burial stones and sediment were also listed, along with a coprolite, or preserved piece of feces, containing cordage.

In August 2024, a further notice identified 226 additional cultural items as associated funerary objects following re-examination of material from the same layer by members of the Eastern Shoshone Tribe. The Forest Service determined that these objects were reasonably believed to have been intentionally placed with or near human remains as part of a death rite or ceremony. The notice did not explain how its count of individual items corresponded to the 44 objects or lots listed in 2022.

== Scientific analysis ==
=== Body and health ===
The Ancestor was an adult man estimated to have been 35–40 years old when he died, with an estimated height of approximately 165 centimetres (5 ft 5 in). Hughes reported both estimates in 1988; the age range also appears in the corrected federal inventory published in 2022.

The 2006 inventory records that Hughes and a team of physicians from the Paleopathology Association examined his remains without destructive testing. Hughes's earlier published account reported that analysis of coprolites, or preserved feces, recovered from his body cavity identified whipworm, Trichuris trichiura. This provides evidence of an intestinal parasite infection, but the account does not establish its severity or whether it contributed to his death.

His cause of death remains unknown. Hughes reported that the specialist examination found no skeletal abnormalities or injuries, while the small amount of surviving soft tissue limited further investigation.

=== Diet ===
Analysis of coprolites, or preserved feces, recovered from the Ancestor's body cavity provided evidence of food he had eaten before his death. Hughes reported that plant material predominated in the samples and that some of it had been cooked. Her account did not identify particular food plants or establish how representative the samples were of his usual diet.

The samples also contained a high proportion of spruce pollen. Hughes noted that spruce releases pollen in spring and tentatively suggested that his burial had taken place in late spring. This was a seasonal interpretation rather than an identification of spruce as a food.

=== Dating ===
The Ancestor's burial was dated by testing a fragment of the mountain sheep hide wrapped around him, rather than his body. Radiocarbon analysis yielded an age of 1,230 ± 110 years before present for laboratory sample I-1009. In this dating system, "present" refers to the fixed reference year 1950. The excavation report's Table 3 expressed the result as 720 ± 110 CE. This is an uncalibrated radiocarbon date, rather than a precise calendar date for his death.

His position within the shelter provided additional context. He lay near the bottom of cultural layer 36, one of the shelter's 38 recorded layers of human activity. The excavators interpreted this position as evidence that he had been buried early during the use of that layer. Material from subsequent occupation had accumulated against and over the stones covering his burial.

== Cultural affiliation ==
The Ancestor has been formally affiliated with two present-day Indigenous communities: the Eastern Shoshone Tribe of the Wind River Reservation in Wyoming and the Shoshone-Bannock Tribes of the Fort Hall Reservation in Idaho. In February 2006, more than 40 years after his discovery, a federal notice published the Forest Service's determination following consultation with representatives of both tribes.

The determination drew on archaeological evidence and historical connections between Indigenous communities. The 2006 notice described his burial layer as associated with Great Basin or Sheepeater people. It also noted historical ties between Sheepeater and Shoshone peoples, identifying both present-day tribes as communities that consider themselves descendants of the Sheepeater people.

Under the Native American Graves Protection and Repatriation Act, the Forest Service determined that a shared group identity could reasonably be traced between the Ancestor and these two tribes. This finding established his cultural affiliation for repatriation purposes.

== Public reception ==
The Ancestor's discovery attracted newspaper coverage across the United States in 1963. McCracken announced the find on 1 October, about two months after the excavation team uncovered the burial. Reports appeared in newspapers in Chicago, Florida and New York, bringing national attention to the Wyoming shelter. According to Hughes, the publicity helped McCracken raise private donations to continue excavations in 1964 and seek funding from the National Geographic Society.

Soon after his removal from the shelter, the Ancestor was placed on public display in the Whitney Gallery of Western Art in Cody. By 1988, about 25 years after his discovery, he had been withdrawn from public viewing. Hughes explained that this was done "out of respect for American Indian religious principles", although she did not specify when he was removed from display.

Respect for Indigenous perspectives is also reflected in the name now used for him. Earlier researchers called him "Mummy Joe", but the McCracken Research Library explains that the nickname is no longer used for reasons of cultural sensitivity. Modern tribal members prefer "The Ancestor".

== Repatriation ==
In February 2006, more than 40 years after his discovery, the Ancestor was identified as eligible for return to the Eastern Shoshone and Shoshone-Bannock tribes under the Native American Graves Protection and Repatriation Act. At that time, he was held at the Buffalo Bill Historical Center in Cody, under the control of Shoshone National Forest. His mountain sheep hide wrapping was the only associated funerary object included in the notice. Repatriation could proceed after 24 March 2006 if no additional claimants came forward.

Sixteen years later, in July 2022, a corrected inventory expanded the associated funerary objects to 44 objects or groups of objects, including all items removed from his burial layer. The correction stated that control of the items it covered had not been transferred. It allowed transfer of the Ancestor and the associated objects to the two tribes after 1 August 2022 if no additional requests were received.

A further notice, published in August 2024, identified 226 additional cultural items following re-examination of material from the same layer by Eastern Shoshone tribal members. These objects remained at the Buffalo Bill Center of the West, the museum's current name. The notice recognized their affiliation with the Eastern Shoshone and Shoshone-Bannock tribes and allowed their repatriation from 5 September 2024. It did not explain how the 226 items corresponded to the objects or lots listed in 2022.

The notices document eligibility and procedures for return; none confirms that the Ancestor or the associated objects were subsequently repatriated.
