= Bighorn Basin Dinosaur Project =

Bighorn Basin Dinosaur Project Logo, Artist: Jason C. Poole

The Bighorn Basin Dinosaur Project (BBDP) is a paleontological research and education group focusing on the Mesozoic ecosystems of the Bighorn Basin in northern Wyoming and southern Montana, U.S.A.

BBDP is headquartered in the Bureau of Natural History at the New Jersey State Museum (NJSM) in Trenton, New Jersey, United States, but has welcomed increasing research and educational collaborations with paleontologists from the Academy of Natural Sciences of Drexel University in Philadelphia, Pennsylvania, the Wyoming Dinosaur Center in Thermopolis, Wyoming, and The Woods Project of Houston, Texas.

== History ==
The New Jersey State Museum’s activities in the Bighorn Basin of northern Wyoming and southern Montana continues a long tradition of paleontological research in the region by some of the science's founding fathers in North America, including many with ties to Princeton University. William Berryman Scott, Francis Spier, and Henry Fairfield Osborne all visited the region in the 1880s, though these expeditions were largely unsuccessful. W. B. Scott's student and successor, William J. Sinclair, first teamed with American Museum of Natural History paleontologist Walter W. Granger in 1910 which resulted in numerous, far more successful expeditions to the region. Together, Sinclair and Granger established the Bighorn Basin as a significant region for Cenozoic fossils. Sinclair continued his expeditions into the region through the 1920s with additional Princeton students, including Glenn Jepsen, who dedicated the remainder of his professional career to the study of Paleocene mammals of the Bighorn Basin. Jepsen, in turn, introduced many more Princeton paleontology students to the region, including present-day paleontologists Philip D. Gingerich, Barbara Grandstaff, and David Parris. David Parris has continued the tradition, spending much of his nearly 50-year career studying the fossil ecosystems of the northern Bighorn Basin, almost entirely as a paleontologist in the Bureau of Natural History at the New Jersey State Museum.

As the Curator of Natural History at the NJSM, David Parris began leading students, colleagues, and volunteers to the region on paleontological expeditions to the Bighorn Basin annually from 2001 through 2010. Jason Schein, Assistant Curator of Natural History at the New Jersey State Museum, has continued the efforts, leading the annual expeditions since 2011, with Parris taking more of an advisory role in the expeditions and research projects.

In 2015, the NJSM’s research efforts in the Bighorn Basin were formalized under the name "Bighorn Basin Dinosaur Project." The field headquarters for the BBDP are located at the Yellowstone-Bighorn Research Association in Red Lodge, Montana. The stated research goals of the BBDP are to study and understand, to the greatest extent possible, the ecosystems that existed throughout that region during the Mesozoic and the early Cenozoic eras.
