= Shoshone Project =

Irrigation project in the U.S. state of Wyoming

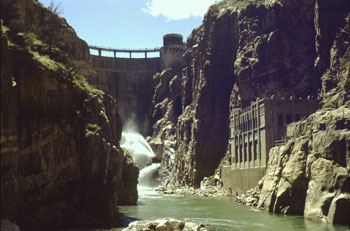
Buffalo Bill Dam with Shoshone Powerplant at right

The Shoshone Project is an irrigation project in the U.S. state of Wyoming. The project provides irrigation for approximately 107,000 acres (430 km^{2}) of crops in the Big Horn Basin, fulfilling the vision of local resident and developer Buffalo Bill Cody, who hoped to make the semi-arid basin into agricultural land. Buffalo Bill Dam on the Shoshone River impounds water for the project in Buffalo Bill Reservoir. In addition to its role in irrigation, the project provides flood control on the Shoshone and generates power, using the 350-foot (110 m) height of Buffalo Bill Dam, once a world record, and the considerable fall of the river through Shoshone Canyon to generate hydroelectric power. Chief crops in the Big Horn Basin are sugar beets, alfalfa, barley, oats, corn, and beans.

== Establishment ==
At the end of the 19th century, Buffalo Bill Cody settled in his namesake town of Cody, Wyoming, buying much of the surrounding lands. Cody promoted a plan to use the waters of the Shoshone to irrigate the plains of the Bighorn Basin extending eastward from Cody. Franklin Wheeler Mondell, later U.S. Senator from Wyoming, filed for the first water rights in 1893 but was unable to follow up on his project. Cody and his partner, Nate Salsbury obtained a permit to irrigate 120,000 acres (49,000 ha) using three canals, but were in turn unable to construct the necessary infrastructure. Cody and local promoters again obtained water rights to irrigate 60,000 acres (24,000 ha) from the state of Wyoming in 1899 and attempted to build a private canal, but lacked sufficient resources. Following the passage of the Reclamation Act in 1902 the state urged the Department of Interior to take over the project. The federal government-backed Shoshone Project was authorized in 1904 by Secretary of the Interior Ethan Allen Hitchcock, based on the 1899 Cody-Salsbury permit. The project started the same year, administered by the Bureau of Reclamation. Work on Buffalo Bill Dam started in 1905. The small Ralston and Corbett dams were completed in 1908. Buffalo Bill Dam (known as Shoshone Dam until 1946) was completed in 1910 at a cost of $1.4 million, at a height of 325 feet (99 m), then the tallest dam in the world. The dam's height was extended by another 25 feet (7.6 m) to 350 feet (110 m) in the 1980s, significantly expanding reservoir capacity.

Land was opened for settlement near Powell in the Garland Division, with extensive agricultural development by 1918. The Frannie Division was opened at about this time. The Willwood Division was opened to development between 1927 and 1938, while the Heart Mountain Division was not opened until 1947.

== Administration ==
The project is administered in four divisions:

- The Garland Division, with 35,863 acres (14,513 ha) of irrigated land, receives water diverted into the Garland Canal by the Corbett Diversion Dam on the Shoshone, 16 miles (26 km) downstream from Buffalo Bill Dam. The 18 miles (29 km) canal has a capacity of 1,000 cubic feet per second (28 m^{3}/s). The Garland Division is administered by the Shoshone Irrigation District, directed by local water users.
- The Heart Mountain Division, with 31,120 acres (12,590 ha) receives seasonal output from the Heart Mountain Powerplant, which discharges into an inverted siphon crossing the Shoshone River. The 26 miles (42 km) Heart Mountain Canal transports the water to users at a rate of 915 cubic feet per second (25.9 m^{3}/s). Portions of the Heart Mountain Canal were built with labor provided by the Civilian Conservation Corps from camp BR-72. Japanese American internees from the Heart Mountain Relocation Center worked on the canal in from 1942 until May 1944. Work was finally completed in 1947.
- The Frannie Division, with 14,600 acres (5,900 ha) receives water from the Garland Canal through a branch canal, the Frannie Canal, which is 44 miles (71 km) long and carries 550 cubic feet per second (16 m^{3}/s).
- The Willwood Division, with 11,530 acres (4,670 ha) receives water from the Willwood Diversion dam on the Shoshone, 8 miles (13 km) downstream from the Corbett Diversion Dam. The Willwood Canal extends for 28 miles (45 km) and can deliver water at 320 cubic feet per second (9.1 m^{3}/s).

== Power generation ==
Waters impounded by Buffalo Bill Dam operate four power plants, two close to the dam's base and two others operated by water piped from the dam, taking advantage of the height change through Shoshone Canyon to place the power stations in the flats beyond the mountain canyon. The original powerplant, the Shoshone Powerplant, and what was initially intended to be a temporary Heart Mountain Powerplant, were supplemented and upgraded with the dam's increase in height from 1986 to 1994.

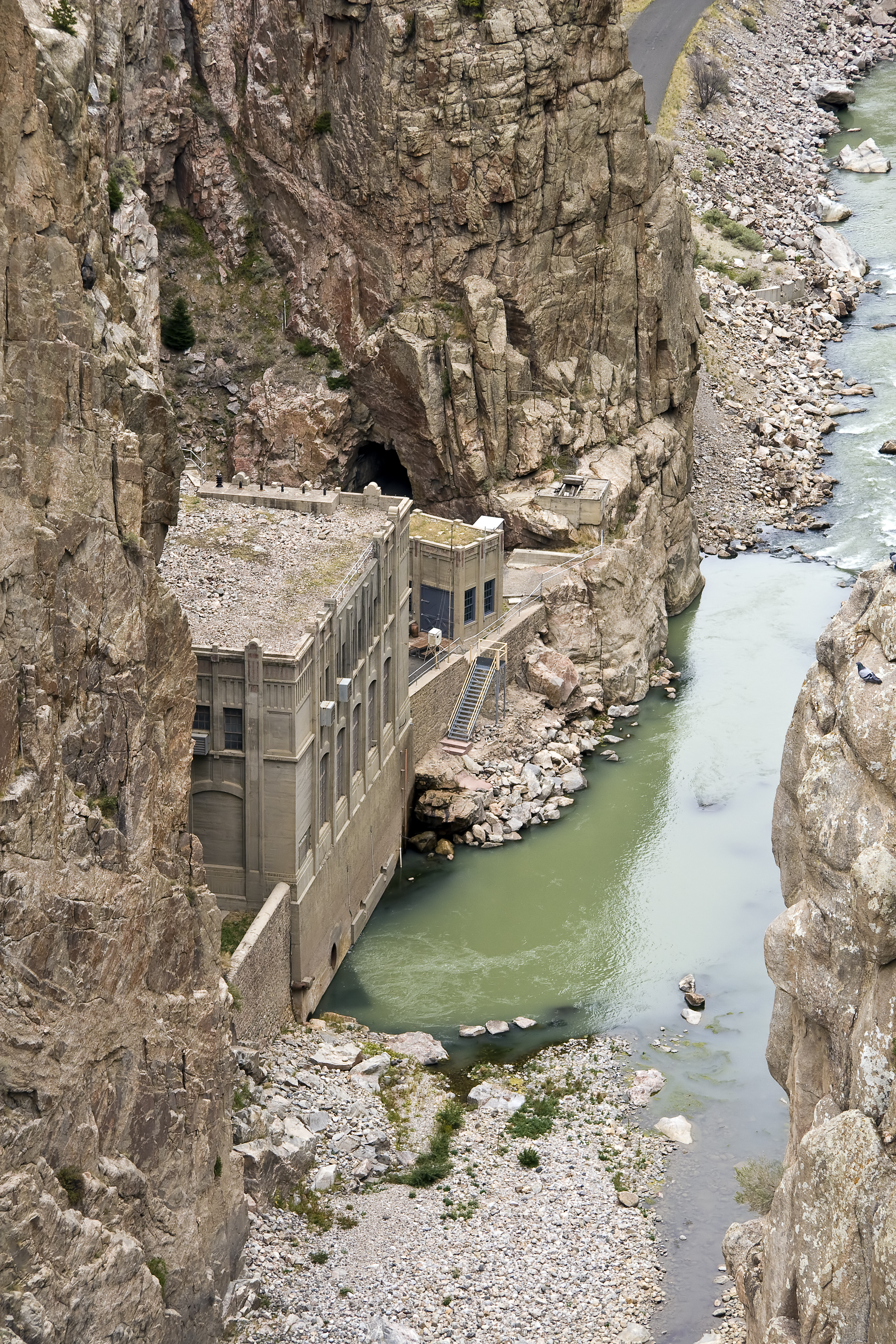
Shoshone Powerplant from the top of Buffalo Bill Dam

- Shoshone Powerplant: Originally built in 1922, the Shoshone Powerplant is located in Shoshone Canyon 600 feet (180 m) from the base of the dam, and operated until 1980. Units 1 and 2 came on line in 1922, Unit 3 in 1931. Installed capacity was 6.012 MW. All three units were shut down in 1980, worn out from fifty years of service. 1 and 2 were decommissioned and left in place, while 3 was replaced with a new 3 MW Francis turbine unit that started operation in 1992. The plant operates with a head of 220 feet (67 m).
- Buffalo Bill Powerplant: The Buffalo Bill Powerplant was built concurrently with work to increase the dam's height by 25 feet (7.6 m) in 1992. The plant, located in Shoshone Canyon downstream from the original Shoshone Powerplant, operates a Francis turbine rated at 18 MW on a head of 266 feet (81 m).
- Heart Mountain Powerplant: Located at the outlet of the Shoshone Canyon Conduit, the Heart Mountain Powerplant was built in 1947 as a temporary facility. It was rebuilt concurrently with the dam heightening project and is operated on a seasonal basis. It operates a 5 MW Francis turbine on a 265-foot (81 m) head. Located near a geothermally active area, construction of the tunnel proved difficult, with fumes contributing to the deaths of two construction workers in 1937.
- Spirit Mountain Powerplant: The Spirit Mountain Powerplant receives pressurized water through a conduit. It primarily functions to dissipate the pressure in the conduit before it enters an open canal, generating power as a byproduct. The unit operates a Francis turbine generating 4.5 MW on a seasonal base load basis, with a 110-foot (34 m) head. It was built in 1994.
