= Mummy Cave =

- U.S. National Register of Historic Places
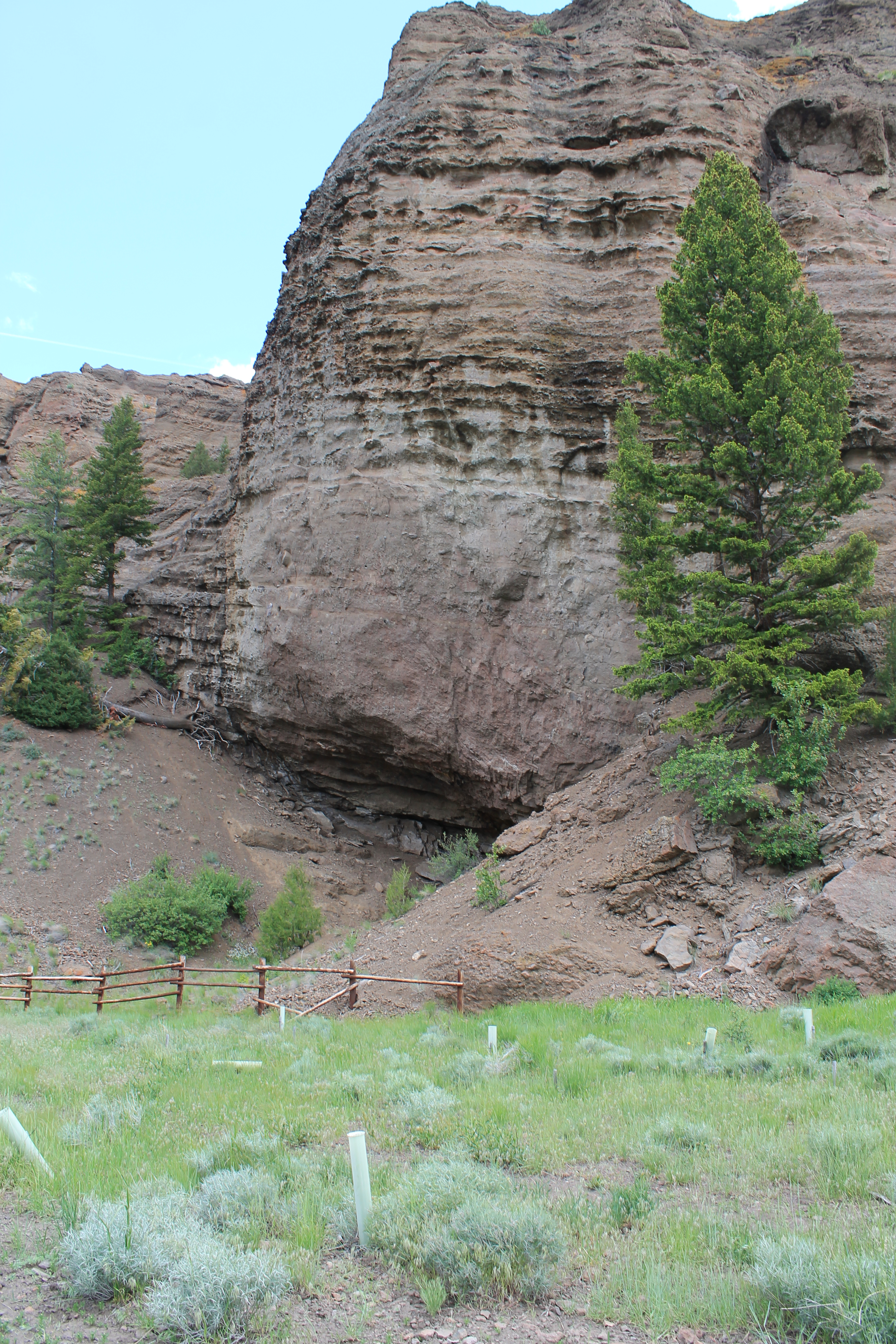
- The cave from a distance

- Location within Wyoming Location within the United States
- Location: Along the North Fork of the Shoshone River, east of Yellowstone National Park Park County, Wyoming, United States
- Nearest city: Cody, Wyoming
- Coordinates: 44°27′38.448″N 109°44′9.6″W
- NRHP reference No.: 81000611
- Added to NRHP: February 18, 1981

Mummy Cave is a rock shelter and archeological site in Park County, Wyoming, United States, near the eastern entrance to Yellowstone National Park. The site is adjacent to the concurrent U.S. Routes 14/16/20, on the left bank of the North Fork of the Shoshone River at an altitude of 6,310 feet (1,920 m) in Shoshone National Forest.

At its mouth, the cave is approximately 150 feet (46 m) wide, and it extends approximately 40 feet (12 m) into a volcanic cliff above the North Fork. It lies along the left bank of the river, next to the mouth of a small stream and opposite from the mouth of Blackwater Creek. The largest known cave along the North Fork, it is believed to have been carved by the river's flow; the reason for its diversion away from the alcove is unknown.

Mummy Cave was occupied between 7280 BC and AD 1580. Discovered by Cody resident Gene Smith in 1957, it was first studied in 1962 and excavated by the Buffalo Bill Historical Center. The site includes unusual amounts of perishable materials such as hide, feathers and wood, as well as the buried and mummified remains of an inhabitant, named by researchers "Mummy Joe," and dated to about AD 800. The cave is notable for the depth of its cultural deposits, extending over 28 feet (8.5 m) in depth, and in particular for the continuity of those deposits. The deposits have been classified into 38 occupation levels that represent at least seasonal use of the site on an annual basis, extending from the Paleoindian period to the late Prehistoric period.

== Geology ==
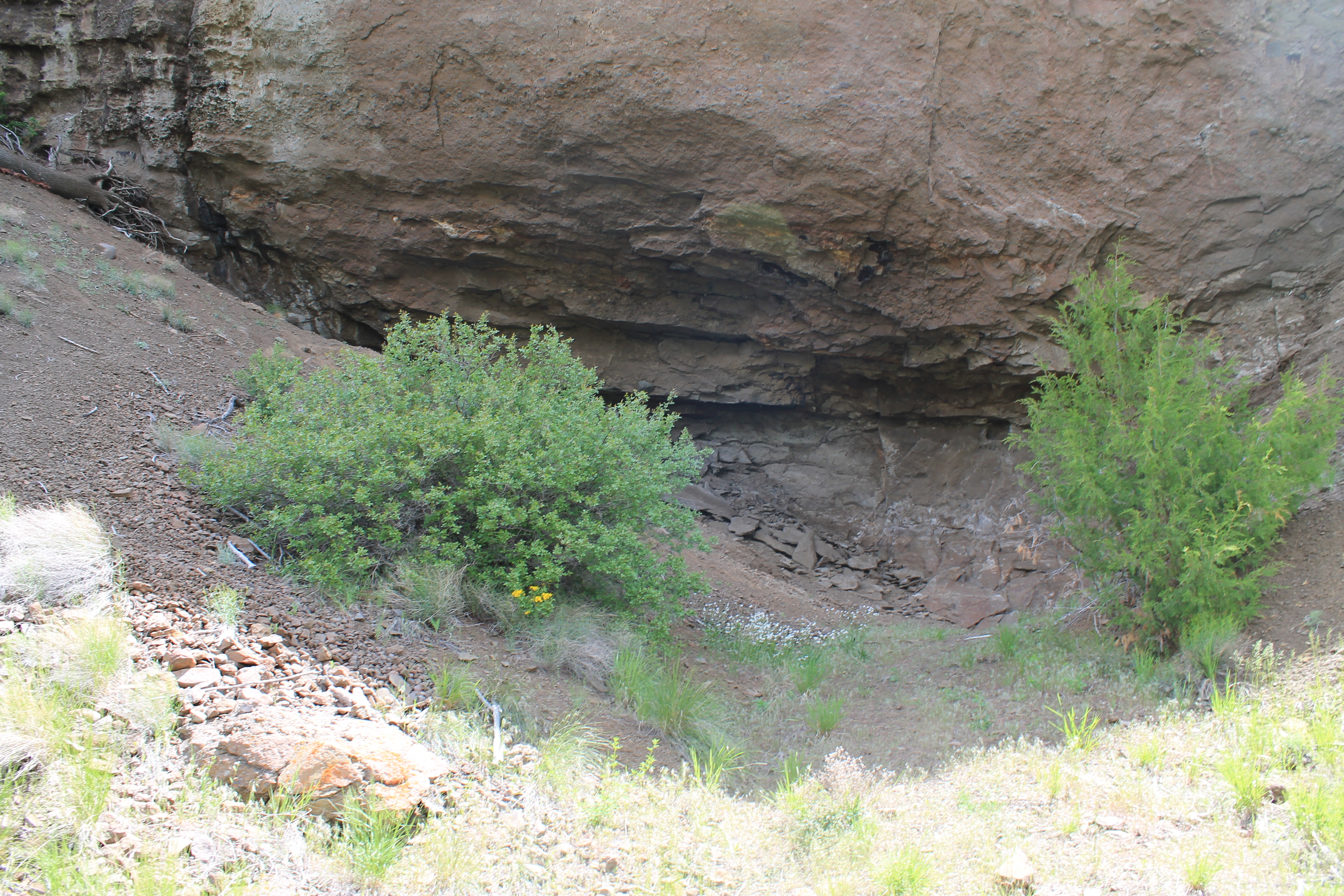
A closer view of the cave

Although it is referred to as a "cave", Mummy Cave is actually a broad, shallow alcove in a vertical cliff. It owes its depth to its overall size and the stability of the parent rock. The alcove's roof is about 50 feet (15 m) above the river, with the rock floor of the alcove at about 4 feet (1.2 m) above the river. By the time it was discovered, the alcove had been almost entirely filled with alluvium. The cliff is composed of Tertiary period volcanic ash mixed with larger rock fragments of volcanic origin. A similar alcove is being cut by the Shoshone at the mouth of Clocktower Creek. The cave fill has accumulated for at least 10,000 years and appears to have originated from nearby debris fans formed where weathered material has flowed down channels in neighboring cliffs.

Apart from the depth and consistent nature of the alluvium, Mummy Cave is also characterized by extreme dryness. The pointed shape of the cliff above prevents rain and meltwater from percolating through the rock to the cave, and there are no vertical joints in the rock above.

== Archeological investigation ==
The investigation of Mummy Cave was led by Robert Edgar from 1963 to 1965. The alcove was marked out into a 5-foot (1.5 m) grid, with a permanent reference mark for elevation marked on the wall. Initial investigation focused on establishing stratigraphy. Once the layers of alluvium in the cave floor were established, the excavation proceeded layer by layer. The excavations terraced the cave floor into 4-to-6-foot (1.2 to 1.8 m) levels, following the established reference grid. Digging was done with hand trowels in the artifact-bearing layers while layers devoid of artifacts were excavated with shovels. Spoils were disposed of down the embankment.

The site had previously been disturbed by relic hunters, who had dug a 2.5 feet (0.76 m) deep pit in what turned out to be the most productive zone of the excavation. The relic hunters appear to have stopped when they encountered a rock cairn that covered what proved to be a human burial site.

By the end of 1963 a portion of the site had been excavated to a depth of 20 feet (6.1 m) and shored with timbers, while the upper three cultural zones (layers 36–38) were removed across the site. During the 1964 season layers 29–35 were removed and some zones were excavated much more deeply. In 1965 layers 24–28 were removed from the central area of the alcove. By this time it was clear that excavation would proceed for the full depth of the site, and that the disposal of a considerable quantity of excavated debris would need to be addressed. A bulldozer was brought in to remove sections of fill beyond the drip line of the shelter. The 1966 season was directed by Wilfred M. Husted. Results of the Mummy Cave investigations were published in Science in 1968.

== Results ==
The excavation of Mummy Cave yielded a nearly continuous succession of artifacts, which span a period of over 9000 years. The artifacts were disposed in a manner that permitted dating in both relative terms through stratigraphy, as well as through radiocarbon dating to establish an absolute scale. This continuum has proved to be invaluable in relating and dating other excavations in the Rocky Mountain region. In particular, the stone projectile points found at Mummy Cave have been used to set the standard for classifying stone arrowheads and spear heads in the region. The point typology has been extrapolated to define cultural and commercial relationships between peoples throughout the American West. Stratigraphy and carbon dating indicate that Mummy Cave was first occupied near the end of the Pinedale glaciation. Later occupancy spanned the Altithermal, followed by a cooler climate from about 1000 BC.

The earliest layers at Mummy Cave yielded a few prismatic stone blades dating to about 7300 BC. Several layers contained no artifacts and were defined by soot layers. By layer 6 the first parallel-oblique points appeared. By Layer 8, roughly corresponding to 6500 BC, the cultural evidence became continuous. Layers 8, 9, 10 and 12 produced lanceolate or leaf-shaped projectile points which have been interpreted as corresponding to Angostura-style points. This implies that the inhabitants of Mummy Cave during this era were big-game hunters from the Great Plains who adapted to the mountain environment. In layer 16, radiocarbon dated to 5630 BC, a new type of point appeared. These Blackwater side-notched points implied the arrival of a group from eastern Nebraska or western Iowa, replacing the previous group which may have moved to the north. The presence of such points suggests a connection with the Simonsen site in northeastern Iowa, which has been dated to the Early Archaic period. This transition coincided with the climatic shift to the Altithermal. Side-notched points recovered from layers 21, 24 and 28 imply a return of the previous inhabitants; the easterners had moved on to the central Columbian Plateau.

Layer 30 was dated to 2470±150 BC. Layer 32 was dated to 870±135 BC. It is hypothesized that layers 32–38 represent the presence of people of the Shoshonean culture, with increasingly definitive Shoshonean artifacts present from layer 36 onward, including cordage and basketwork. Layer 38 yielded gray flat-bottomed pottery of Shoshonean manufacture.

The wide range of artifacts discovered at the site has caused Mummy Cave to be seen as a highly significant site for the study of Rocky Mountain archeology. The cave's significance was recognized by the National Park Service with its placement on the National Register of Historic Places in 1981.

=== Animal bones ===
Several thousand animal bone fragments were recovered from Mummy Cave. Most were too small or incomplete to identify usefully, but analysis at the University of Texas at El Paso identified more than 2,000. Bighorn sheep and deer of the genus Odocoileus were prominent among the remains.

The bones represented at least 88 sheep and 15 deer, approximately six sheep for every deer. This predominance was unusual because deer were expected to be at least as plentiful near the shelter. One proposed explanation was that people used the cave as a base for hunting sheep higher in the mountains.

Sheep occurred in nearly every occupation layer containing animal bones. Both sexes were represented, with ages ranging from unborn or newborn animals to old adults. Butchering cuts and burned bones demonstrated human use. Sheep were especially numerous in layers 30 and 36. These concentrations could reflect larger hunting parties, longer stays or winter hunts when sheep descended to lower elevations.

Deer also supplied food and material for tools, as shown by butchering marks, burned leg-bone fragments and a worked antler base. A rabbit shoulder blade bore cuts, and a beaver upper-arm bone was partly burned. Ducks, geese, grouse and marmots were considered probable food animals, although direct evidence was lacking. Other birds, small rodents and carnivores could have accumulated naturally. Possible dog remains were too uncertain to establish their presence.

The remains offered seasonal clues. An unborn or newborn animal, probably a sheep, indicated early-spring occupation. Migratory birds and hibernating mammals suggested warmer-season visits if people had brought them into the shelter. Layer 30 contained such animals, indicating warm-weather use even if winter visits also occurred. Layer 36 lacked animals restricted to warmer seasons. Winter hunting visits remained possible.

== Human remains ==
In July 1963, excavators discovered the partially mummified remains of an Indigenous man while clearing an area disturbed by earlier digging. Now known as the Mummy Cave Ancestor, the man was approximately 35–40 years old when he died and had been wrapped in a sheep hide robe. The shelter's dry conditions preserved parts of his body and clothing. In 2006, the Shoshone National Forest formally identified his cultural affiliation with the Eastern Shoshone and Shoshone-Bannock tribes under the Native American Graves Protection and Repatriation Act, providing for his repatriation.

== See also ==
- Archaeology of the Americas
- Arlington Springs Man – (Human remains)
- Calico Early Man Site – (Archeological site)
- Cueva de las Manos – (Cave paintings)
- Buhl Woman – (Human remains)
- Fort Rock Cave – (Archeological site)
- Kennewick Man – (Human remains)
- Kwäday Dän Ts’ìnchi – (Human remains)
- Marmes Rockshelter – (Archeological site)
- Paisley Caves – (Archeological site)
