= Buffalo Bill Dam =

Dam on the Shoshone River in Wyoming, US

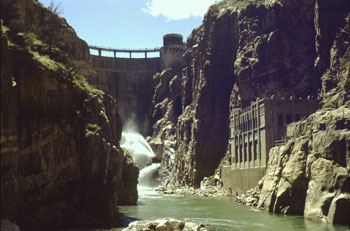
- Buffalo Bill Dam (prior to 1961)

- Location within Wyoming
- Official name: Buffalo Ridge
- Location: Park County, Wyoming, US
- Coordinates: 44°30′6″N 109°11′0″W
- Construction began: 1905; 121 years ago
- Opening date: 1910; 116 years ago
- Operator: U.S. Bureau of Reclamation

Dam and spillways
- Type of dam: Concrete gravity arch
- Impounds: Shoshone River
- Height: 350 feet (110 m)
- Length: 200 feet (61 m)
- Width (crest): 10 feet (3.0 m)
- Width (base): 108 feet (33 m)
- Dam volume: 87,515 cu yd (66,910 m^{3})
- Spillway type: Concrete lined tunnel through south abutment, radial arm gates
- Spillway capacity: 84,725 cu ft/s (2,399.1 m^{3}/s)

Reservoir
- Creates: Buffalo Bill Reservoir
- Total capacity: 869,230 acre-feet (1.07218 km^{3}) nominal, 623,557 acre-feet (0.769146 km^{3}) due to siltation

Power Station
- Hydraulic head: 265 ft (81 m)
- Turbines: 1 x 3 MW Francis turbine, Unit 3 in Shoshone Powerplant; 3 x 6 MW Francis turbines in Buffalo Bill Powerplant; 1 x 5 MW Francis turbine in Heart Mountain Powerplant and 1 x 4.5 MW Francis turbine in Spirit Mountain Powerplant
- Installed capacity: 30.5 MW
- Annual generation: 91,114,580 KWh
- Buffalo Bill Dam
- U.S. National Register of Historic Places
- Location: W of Cody on U.S. 14
- Nearest city: Cody, Wyoming
- Built: January 15, 1910; 116 years ago
- NRHP reference No.: 71000890
- Added to NRHP: August 12, 1971

Buffalo Bill Dam is a concrete arch-gravity dam on the Shoshone River in the U.S. state of Wyoming. Originally 325 feet (99 m), it was the tallest dam in the world when it opened in 1910; a 25-foot (7.6 m) extension was added in 1992 in one of the numerous changes and improvements to the structure and its support facilities, which include two full-time power generators and two seasonal operations added between 1920 and 1994, and a 2.8-mile (4.5 km) irrigation tunnel completed in 1939.

The dam is located in Shoshone Canyon, and named after the famous Wild West figure William "Buffalo Bill" Cody, who founded the nearby town of Cody and owned much of the land now covered by the reservoir formed by its construction. It is part of the Shoshone Project, successor to several visionary schemes promoted by Cody to irrigate the Bighorn Basin and turn it from a semi-arid sagebrush-covered plain to productive agricultural land. Known at the time of its construction as Shoshone Dam, it was renamed in 1946 to honor Cody.

The original structure was designed by engineer Daniel Webster Cole and was built between 1905 and 1910. It was listed on the National Register of Historic Places in 1971 and named a National Historic Civil Engineering Landmark by the American Society of Civil Engineers in 1973. The land around the reservoir is maintained as Buffalo Bill State Park.

== Description ==
The dam is a concrete arch-gravity dam, 70 feet (21 m) wide at the base and 200 feet (61 m) wide at the crest, with an original height of 325 feet (99 m), extended 25 feet (7.6 m) between 1985 and 1992. The concrete structure measures 108 feet (33 m) deep at the base, tapering to 10 feet (3.0 m) at the crest, with a volume of 82,900 cubic yards (63,400 m^{3}) of concrete. It is anchored into Precambrian granitic rock on either side. The spillway is an uncontrolled overflow weir on the south side, 298 feet (91 m) wide, dropping through a tunnel in the south abutment.

The first of four full-time and seasonal power generation facilities was added in 1922.

- Originally equipped with two generators, the Shoshone Power Plant was expanded to a third in 1931, with a total capacity of 6 MW. All three were decommissioned in 1980, and a single 3 MW generator was put on line in 1992.
- The Heart Mountain Power Plant was built in 1947, then upgraded with a new seasonally operated 5 MW turbine concurrently with the dam-heightening project.
- The Buffalo Bill Power Plant was built concurrently with the dam-heightening project and opened with three 6 MW generators in 1992.
- The Spirit Mountain Power Plant was opened in 1994, and seasonally operates a 4.5 MW generator.

The Heart Mountain Canal Project, which brings water to irrigate lands to the north of the river, required the construction of the 2.8-mile (4.5 km) Shoshone Canyon Tunnel, completed in 1939.

== Construction ==
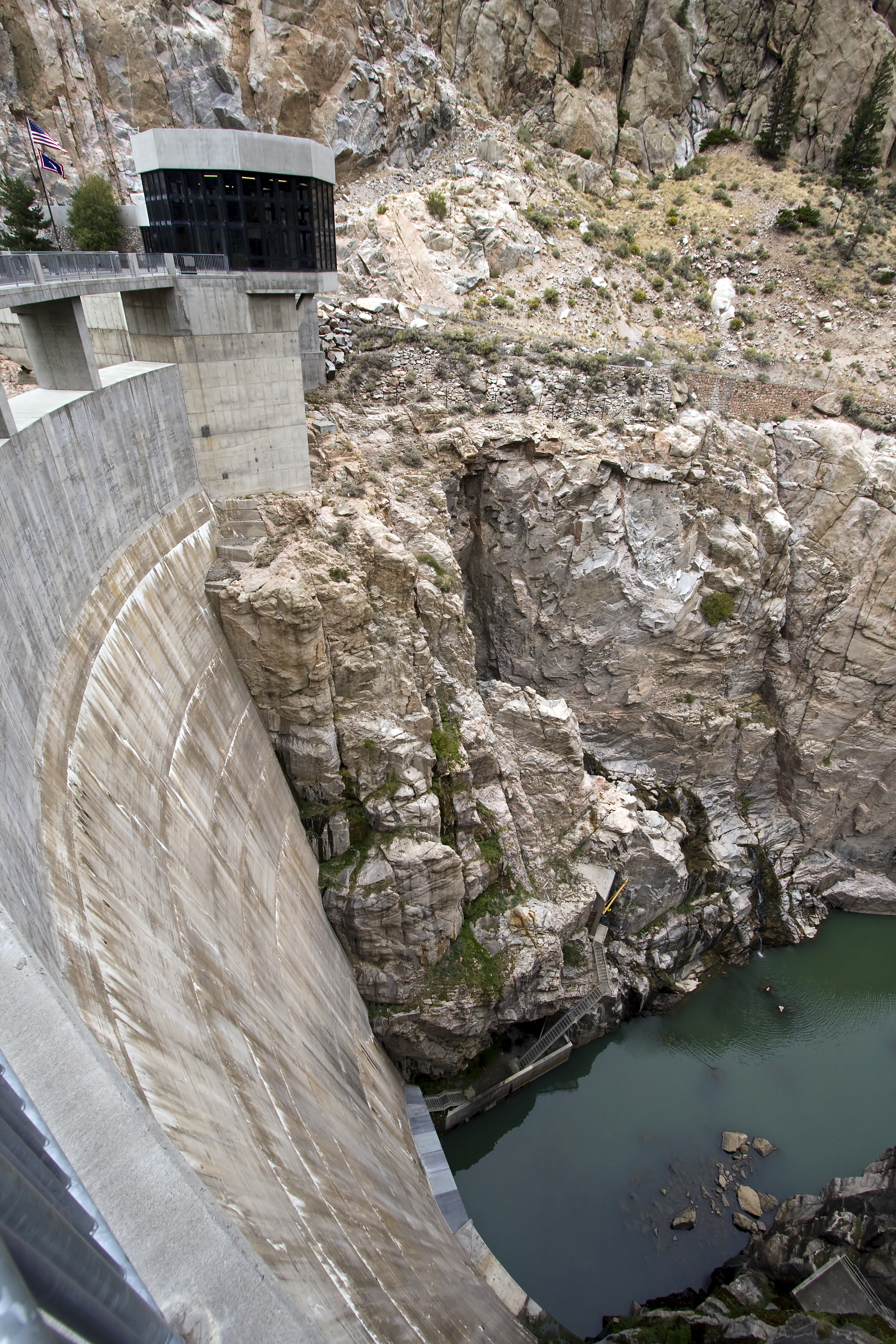
Downstream face of Buffalo Bill Dam looking north, with the old right abutment outlet works connected by a ladder below and to the right of the base of the dam

With the authorization of the Shoshone Project in 1904, Buffalo Bill Dam became one of the earliest projects of the new Bureau of Reclamation. The ambitious project involved the construction of one of the first high concrete dams in the United States. Work began immediately, with drilling for geologic investigation starting in July 1904 and continuing for ten months. Work proceeded concurrently on the construction of an access road up the narrow canyon from Cody. The chosen contractor, Prendergast & Clarkson of Chicago, started work in September 1905, building a camp for workers and starting on a diversion dam, which was to divert the river into a wooden flume, through a tunnel and out through another flume to rejoin the river bed. Two men were killed in the construction of the tunnel. A June 1906 flood destroyed the flume. The delay caused the Bureau of Reclamation to suspend the contractor's contract and to call upon the contractor's bonding company, the U.S. Fidelity and Guaranty Company, to ensure the completion of the work. Little work was done until March 1907. Another flood in July damaged the diversion dam again. Working conditions were harsh, leading to the first strike in Wyoming's history in November, in which workers demanded and received three dollars a day from USF&G.

USF&G delegated responsibility for the work to two new contractors, Locher and Grant Smith and Company, in March 1908. Work progressed more quickly, with the first concrete pours in April. Spring floods set the project back once again, causing concrete work to be suspended. Concrete work started again in March 1909, and despite more spring flooding that suspended work from July to September, work moved quickly. Another threatened strike was broken when Italian laborers were replaced with Bulgarian workers. Final concrete was poured in January 1910, with a final cost of $1.4 million. Seven construction workers were killed on the project.

Immediately after completion, the dam suffered from leakage through the outlet works, leading to low water elevations that exposed mudflats, which soon produced dense blowing dust. Corrective work to valves took until 1915. Problems with the north abutment's outlet works (on the right, facing the dam from downstream) led to their abandonment in 1959. They were sealed in 1961. The reservoir began to lose capacity immediately as a result of the Shoshone's heavy silt load, and the material deposited at the head of the reservoir continued to blow when the reservoir was drawn down. Work continued on silt dikes and reforestation into the 1950s, but capacity is reduced from the reservoir's nominal capacity of 869,230 acre-feet (1.07218 km^{3}) to 623,557 acre-feet (0.769146 km^{3}) due to siltation.

The new reservoir covered hot springs at the forks of the Shoshone, similar to those found at Colter's Hell at the mouth of the Shoshone Canyon.

=== Shoshone Power Plant ===
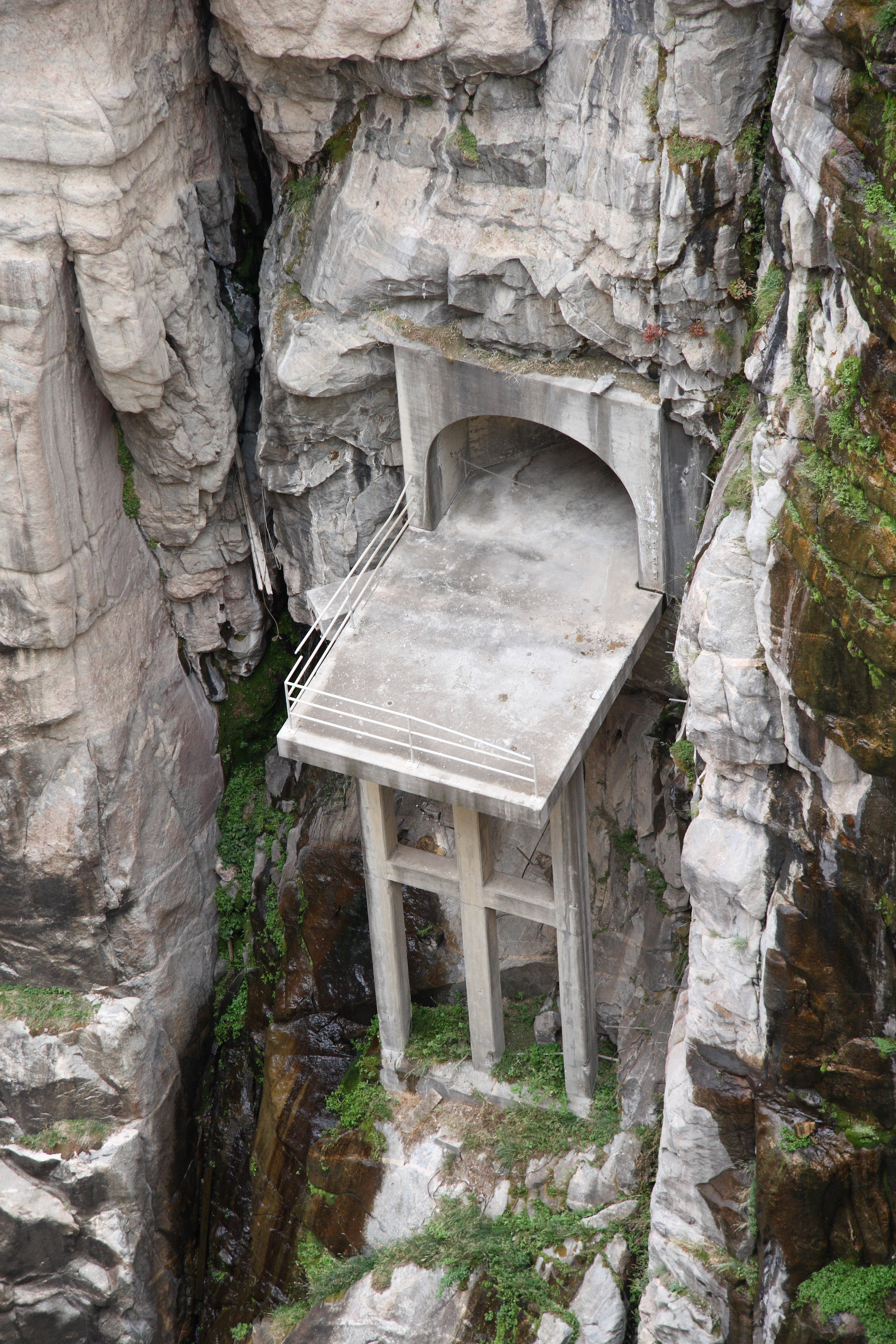
South abutment outlet works with seepage darkening canyon walls and spurring growth of vegetation

Work on the Shoshone Power Plant started in 1920. The power plant is located 600 feet (180 m) downstream from the dam on the north side of the canyon. Following delays for spring flooding, work on the powerhouse and supply tunnel was complete in 1922, ready for the installation of electrical equipment. Generating units 1 and 2 came on line in 1922, with Unit 3 in 1931. Installed capacity was 6.012 MW. All three units were shut down in 1980, worn out from fifty years of service. 1 and 2 were decommissioned and left in place, while 3 was replaced with a new 3 MW Francis turbine unit that started operation in 1992. The plant operates with a head of 220 feet (67 m).

=== Shoshone Canyon Tunnel ===
The proposed Heart Mountain Canal project, intended to irrigate lands to the north of the river, required a new tunnel to direct irrigation waters to a suitable elevation for distribution. Work on the 2.8-mile (4.5 km) Shoshone Canyon Tunnel started in 1937, accompanied by the death of two tunnel workers who were overcome by fumes from explosives and hydrogen sulfide from nearby geothermal activity, and were subsequently struck by construction equipment. A natural cave had to be crossed by a concrete flume of two 70-foot (21 m) spans, constructed under difficult conditions in a high-gas environment. Work on the tunnel by the Utah Construction Company was complete in 1939.

=== Heart Mountain Power Plant ===
The Heart Mountain Power Plant was built at the tunnel's outlet in 1947 as a temporary facility. It was rebuilt concurrently with the dam-heightening project and is operated on a seasonal basis. It operates a 5 MW Francis turbine on a 265-foot (81 m) head.

== Renovation and height increase ==
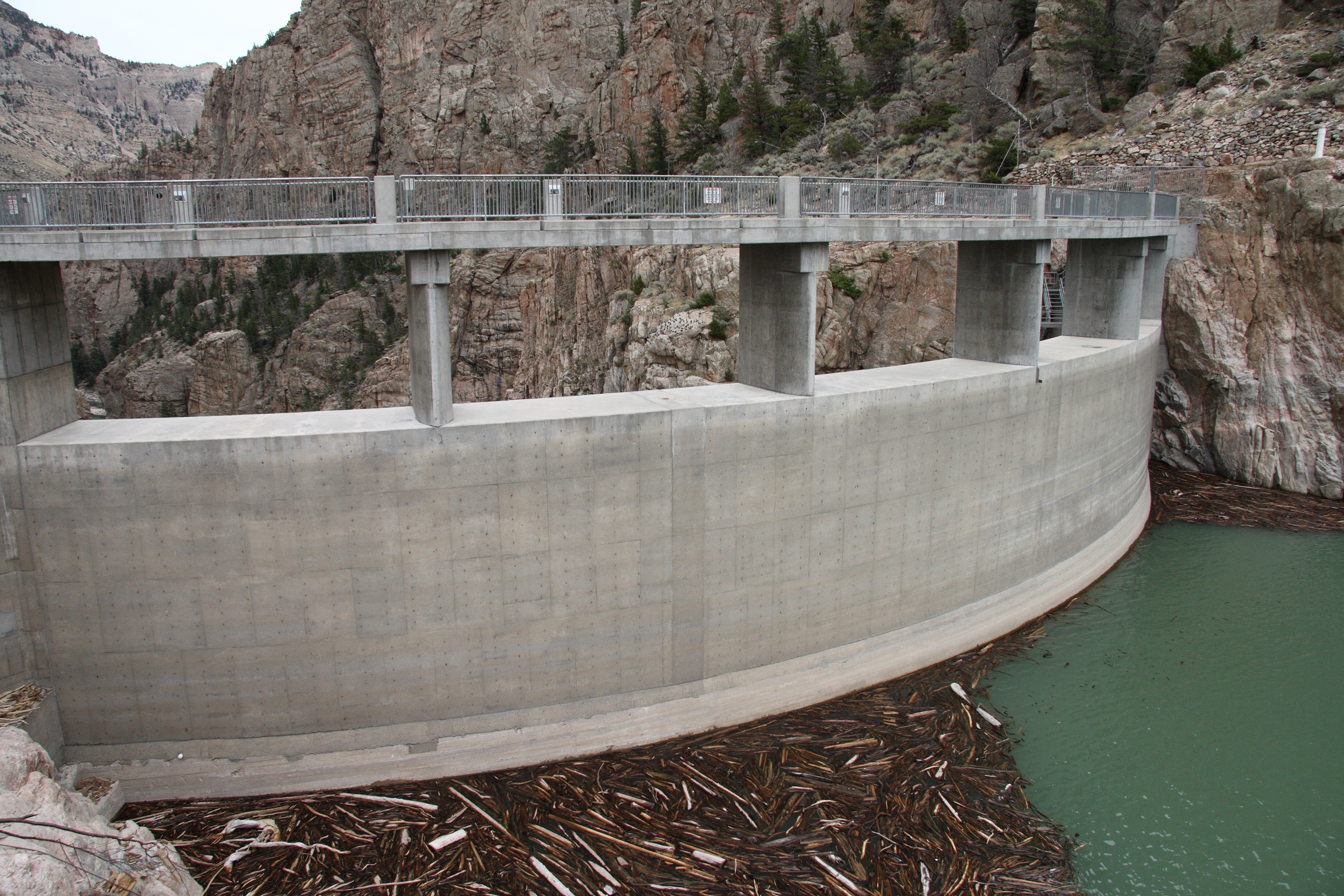
Upstream face showing the 25-foot (7.6 m) 1993 addition

Starting in 1985, the crest of the dam was raised 25 feet (7.6 m), increasing the reservoir's capacity by 260,000 acre-feet (0.32 km^{3}) when the project was completed in 1993. The spillways were enlarged and equipped with radial arm gates. The project also included a visitor center, located at the north end of the dam's crest. The additional height allowed 25.5 MW of additional generating capacity to be added to the project. The expanded reservoir inundated facilities at Buffalo Bill State Park, requiring their relocation and reconstruction.

=== Buffalo Bill Power Plant ===
The Buffalo Bill Power Plant was built concurrently with the work to increase the dam's height in 1992. The plant, located in Shoshone Canyon downstream from the original Shoshone Power Plant, operates three Francis turbines with generators rated at 6 MW each on a head of 266 feet (81 m).

=== Spirit Mountain Power Plant ===
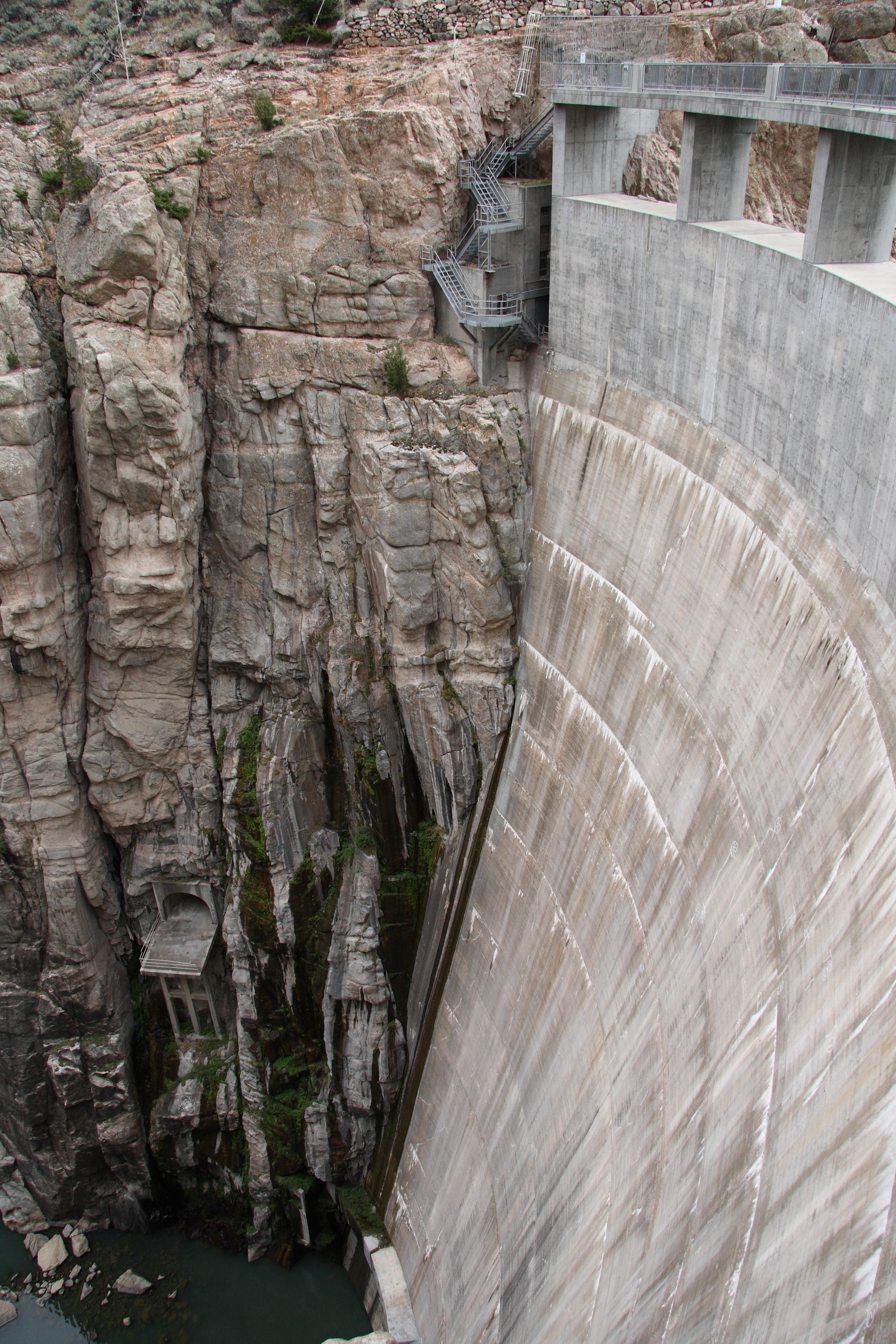
Downstream face of the dam, showing the new 25-foot addition

The Spirit Mountain Power Plant receives pressurized water through a conduit. It primarily functions to dissipate the pressure in the conduit before it enters an open canal, generating power as a byproduct. The unit operates a Francis turbine generating 4.5 MW on a seasonal base load basis, with a 110-foot (34 m) head. It was built in 1994.

== See also ==
- Pathfinder Dam, a similar and contemporary dam in Wyoming, built of stone masonry due to its distance from concrete supplies
- List of largest reservoirs of Wyoming
