= Colter's Hell =

- U.S. National Register of Historic Places
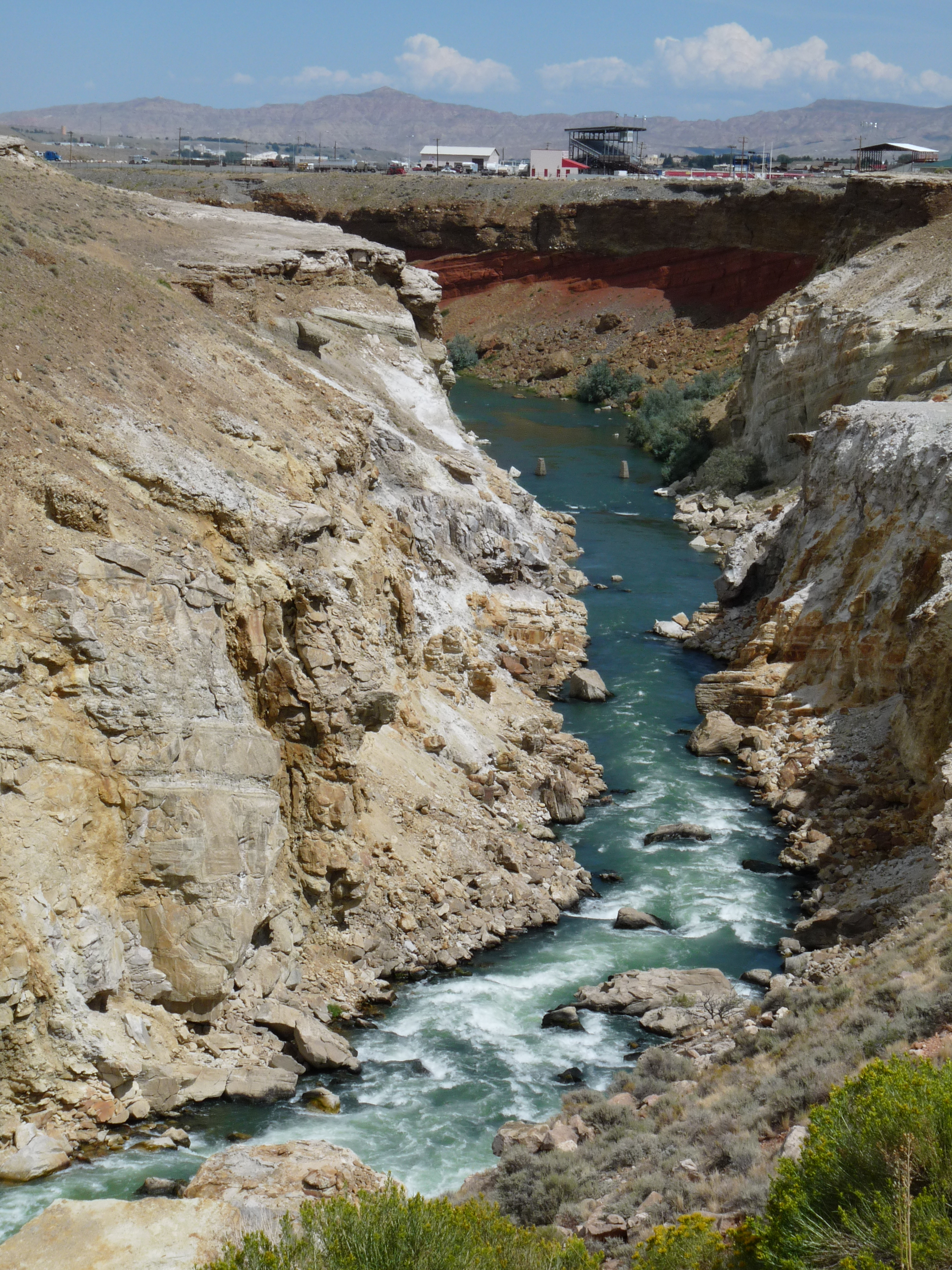

- Location within Wyoming Location within the United States
- Location: Park County, Wyoming, USA
- Nearest city: Cody, Wyoming
- Coordinates: 44°30′53″N 109°7′2″W
- NRHP reference No.: 73001937
- Added to NRHP: August 14, 1973

Colter's Hell is an area of fumaroles and hot springs on the Shoshone River near Cody in the U.S. state of Wyoming. The thermal area covers about one square mile (2.6 km^{2}) at the mouth of the Shoshone's canyon. Its thermal activity has declined since its description by mountain man John Colter, who parted from the Lewis and Clark Expedition prior to its conclusion, and passed through the region in the winter of 1807–1808. Colter's account of the features on what was then called the Stinkingwater River has subsequently been confused with the much more extensive and powerful geysers in Yellowstone National Park, which Colter may not have actually visited.

Other early descriptions of Colter's Hell date back to the trapper Joseph Meek in the year of 1830, as well as to Plenty Coups (Alaxchíia Ahú), a principal chief of the Crow people, who camped with his tribe at the thermal area in 1840. Meek had seen geyser basin in Yellowstone and described Colter's Hell in similar terms, implying that there were active geysers at his visit. Today, the area consists of hot springs and steam vents. Several extinct geyser or hot spring cones stand up to 30 feet (9.1 m) high on the riverbank. Other hot springs were located near the confluence of the north and south forks of the Shoshone, now drowned under the reservoir created by Buffalo Bill Dam.

The notion that Colter's Hell referred to one of the geyser basins of Yellowstone first appeared in Hiram M. Chittenden's 1895 book Yellowstone National Park. However, Chittenden went on to describe a "tar spring" on the Stinkingwater as well under the same name. Chittenden's speculation contradicts the earliest published description of the site, in Washington Irving's account of Captain Benjamin L.E. Bonneville's journals, of Bonneville's scouts' visit to the location in 1833, the same year that another of Bonneville's survey parties discovered the geyser basins of Yellowstone along the Firehole River.

Colter's Hell is just to the north of US 14-16-20 on the west side of Cody. It was listed on the National Register of Historic Places in 1973.
