= Shoshone River =

River in Wyoming, United States

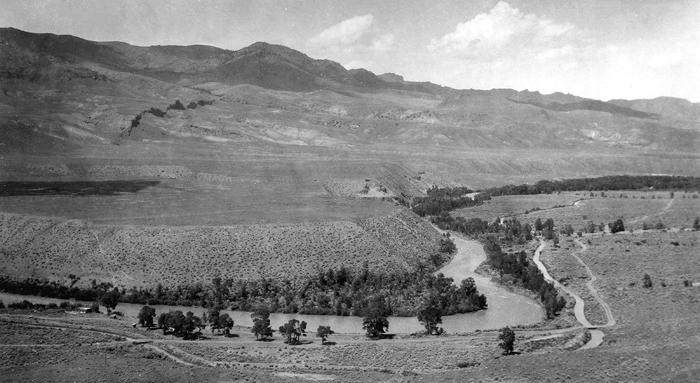
- South Fork Shoshone River in Park County, Wyoming, 1923.

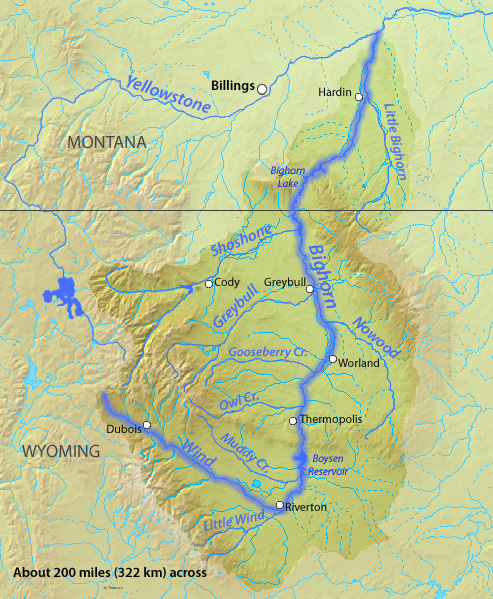
- Map of the Bighorn River basin including the Shoshone River
- Native name: Aashilitshia (Shoshoni); Aashbikkaashée (Shoshoni)

Location
- Country: United States
- State: Wyoming
- Cities: Cody, Wyoming, Powell, Wyoming, Lovell, Wyoming

Physical characteristics
- Source
  - location: Absaroka Range, Wyoming
  - coordinates: 44°30′04″N 109°11′02″W
- Mouth: Big Horn River
  - location: Lovell, Wyoming
  - coordinates: 44°51′44″N 108°12′17″W
- Length: 100 mi (160 km)
- Basin size: 2,989 sq mi (7,740 km^{2})
- Discharge
  - location: below Buffalo Bill Dam
  - average: 1,037 cu ft/s (29.4 m^{3}/s)
  - minimum: 59 cu ft/s (1.7 m^{3}/s)
  - maximum: 17,300 cu ft/s (490 m^{3}/s)

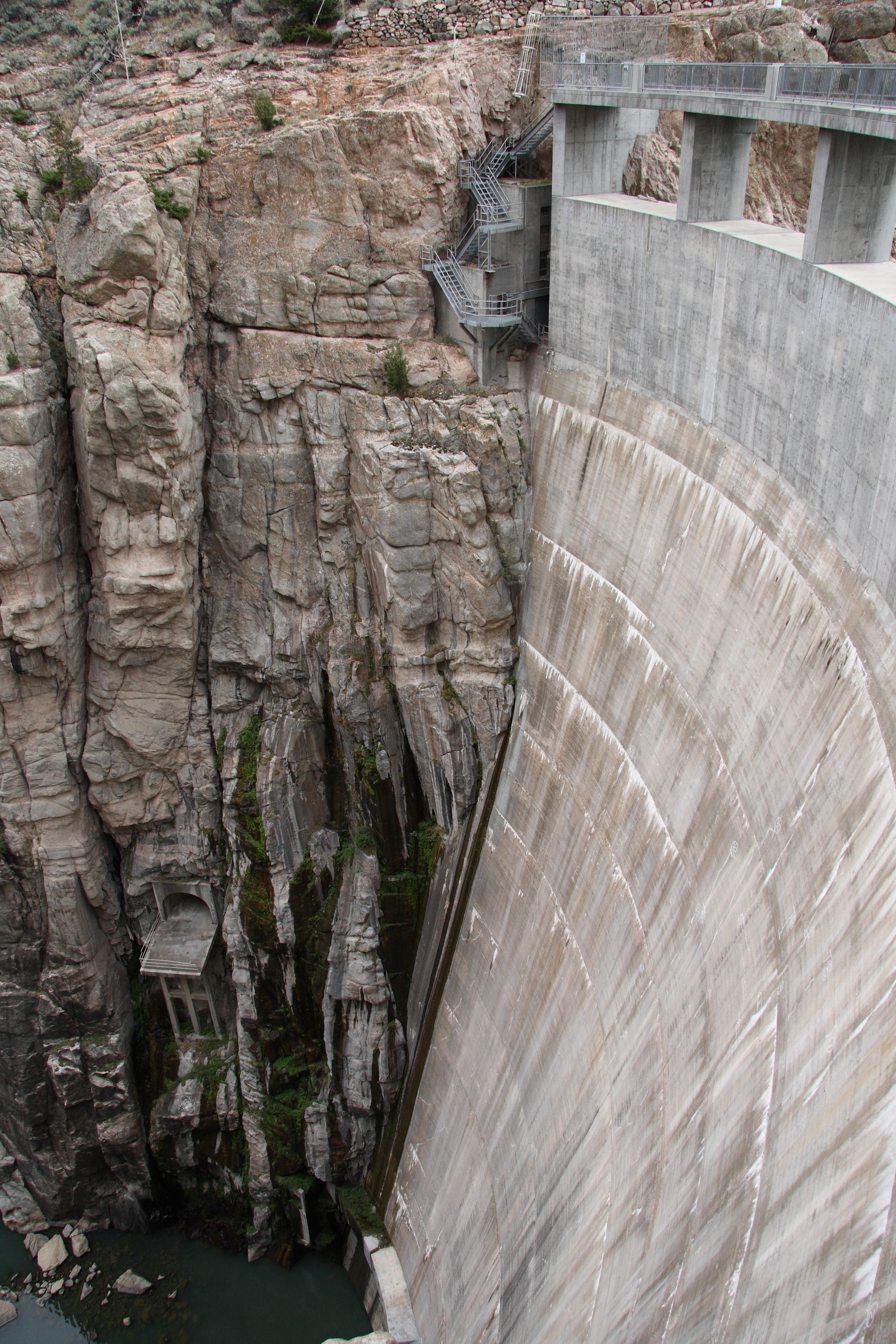
Buffalo Bill Dam on the Shoshone River, September 2007

The Shoshone River is a 100-mile (160 km) long river in northern Wyoming, United States. Its headwaters are in the Absaroka Range in Shoshone National Forest. It ends when it runs into the Big Horn River near Lovell, Wyoming. Cities it runs near or through are Cody, Powell, Byron, and Lovell. Near Cody, it runs through a volcanically active region of fumaroles known as Colter's Hell. This contributed to the river being named on old maps of Wyoming as the Stinking Water River.

The current name was established in 1901 due to popular demand.

West of Cody the river is impounded in Shoshone Canyon by the Buffalo Bill Dam, created as part of the Shoshone project; one of the nation's first water conservation projects. A number of hot springs along the Shoshone were drowned by the reservoir. Upstream of Buffalo Bill Reservoir the Shoshone splits into the North Fork, which follows a long canyon down from the Absaroka Range to the vicinity of the east entrance of Yellowstone National Park, and the South Fork, which originates at the southern end of the Absarokas.

== See also ==
- List of rivers in Wyoming
- Mummy Cave, an alcove eroded into a cliff face by the North Fork of the Shoshone that has yielded evidence of 9000 years of occupation
- Shoshonite
