= Pylon =

Pylon may refer to:

== Structures and boundaries ==
- Pylon (architecture), the gateway to the inner part of an Ancient Egyptian temple or Christian cathedral
- Pylon, a support tower structure for suspension bridges or highways
- Pylon, an orange marker designating a corner of an American football end zone
- Aircraft pylon, an external mount for equipment such as engines and weapons
- Electricity pylon, a steel lattice tower used to support an overhead power line
- Traffic pylon, a cone-shaped marker that is placed on roads or footpaths to temporarily redirect traffic
- Traction current pylon, a railroad pylon carrying at least one circuit for traction current

== Arts, entertainment, and media ==
- Pylon (Beabadoobee album), a 2026 album by Beabadoobee
- Pylon (Killing Joke album), a 2015 album by Killing Joke
- Pylon (band), a rock band from Athens, Georgia, US
- Pylon (novel), a 1935 novel by William Faulkner
  - Pylon (film) or The Tarnished Angels, a 1957 movie based on the novel
- Pylon (StarCraft), a structure used by the Protoss race in the StarCraft universe
- Pylon (play), a Scottish play
- "Pylon" (Endeavour), a TV episode

== Other uses ==
- Pylon turn, a flight maneuver in which an aircraft banks into a circular turn around a fixed spot on the ground
- Pylons project, a set of open source web application frameworks written in Python

== See also ==
- Pylon Peak (disambiguation), several mountains
- Overhead line pylon (disambiguation)
- Pilon (disambiguation)
- Pylos, a town in Greece
