= Pilon =

Pilon, Pilón or PILON may refer to:

- Pilon (surname)
- Pilon (ankle), the distal articular segment of the tibia
  - pilon fracture
- Pilón, a Cuban musical form and a popular dance created in the 1950s
- Pilón, Cuba, a town and municipality in Granma Province, Cuba
- Pilón, Panama, a subdivision of Montijo District in Panama
- Hato Pilón, a district subdivision in Panama
- Puerto Pilón, a subdivision of Colón District in Panama
- PILON, abbreviation for Pay in lieu of notice

== See also ==
- Pylon (disambiguation)
