= Overhead line =

Cable that provides power to electric railways, trams, and trolleybuses

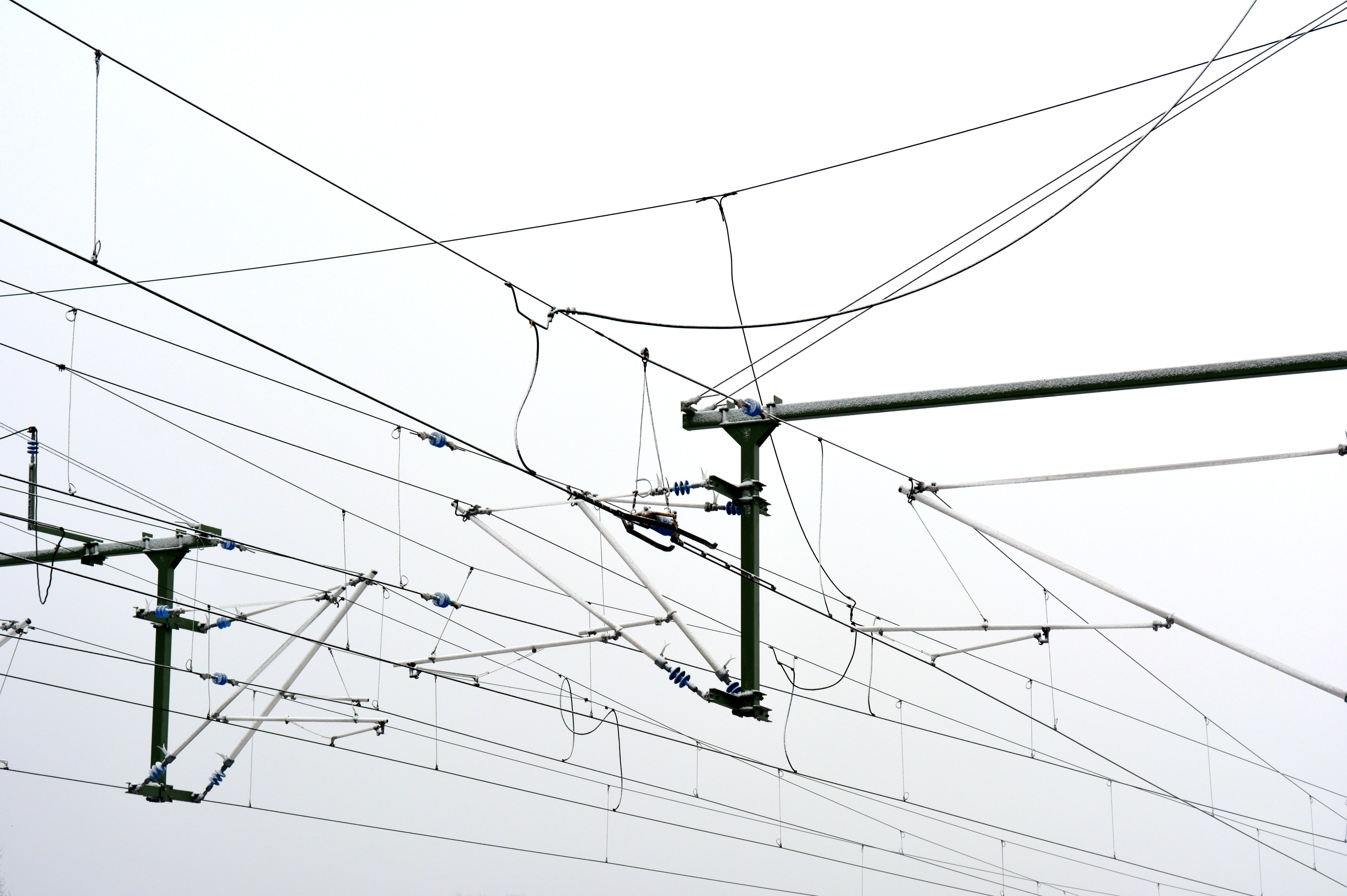
Overhead lines

An overhead line or overhead wire is an electrical cable that is used to transmit electrical energy to electric locomotives, electric multiple units, trolleybuses or trams. The generic term used by the International Union of Railways for the technology is overhead line. It is known variously as overhead catenary, overhead contact line (OCL), overhead contact system (OCS), overhead equipment (OHE), overhead line equipment (OLE or OHLE), overhead lines (OHL), overhead wiring (OHW), traction wire, and trolley wire.

An overhead line consists of one or more wires (or rails, particularly in tunnels) situated over rail tracks, raised to a high electrical potential by connection to feeder stations at regularly spaced intervals along the track. The feeder stations are usually fed from a high-voltage electrical grid.

== Overview ==
Electric vehicles that collect their current from overhead lines use a device such as a pantograph, bow collector or trolley pole. It presses against the underside of the lowest overhead wire, the contact wire. Current collectors are electrically conductive and allow current to flow through to the train or tram and back to the feeder station through the steel wheels on one or both running rails. Non-electric locomotives (such as diesels) may pass along these tracks without affecting the overhead line, although there may be difficulties with overhead clearance. Alternative electrical power transmission schemes for trains include third rail, ground-level power supply, batteries and electromagnetic induction.

Vehicles like buses that have rubber tyres cannot provide a return path for the current through their wheels, and must instead use a pair of overhead wires to provide both the current and its return path.

== Construction ==
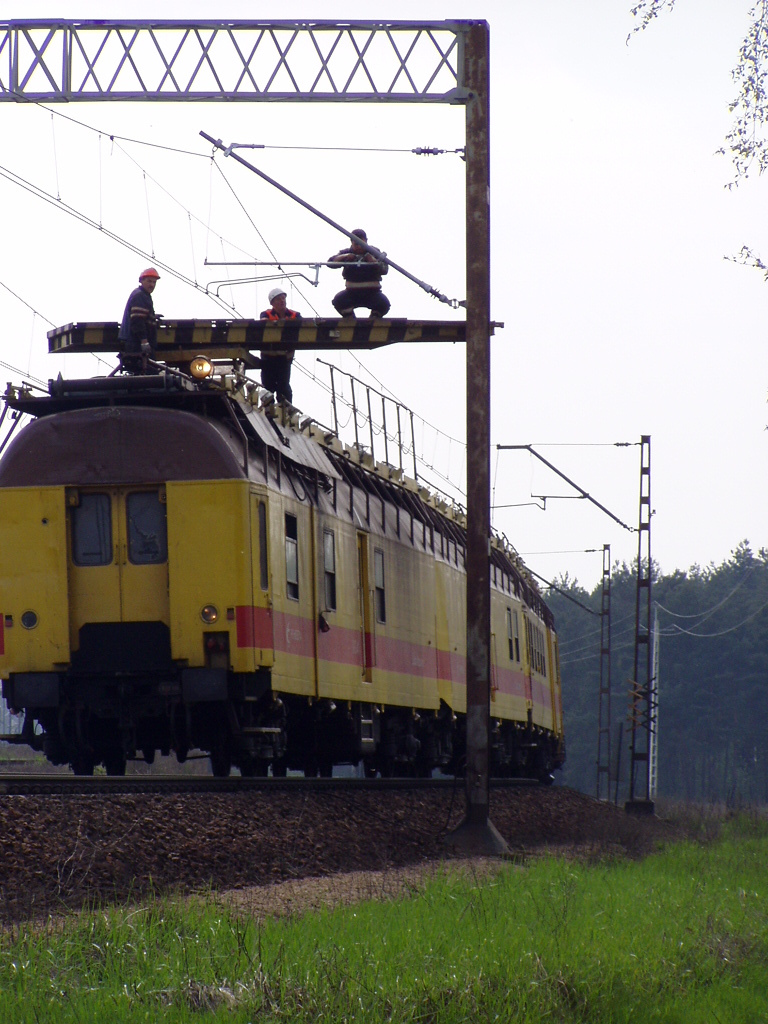
Lineworkers on a maintenance of way vehicle repairing overhead lines (Poland)

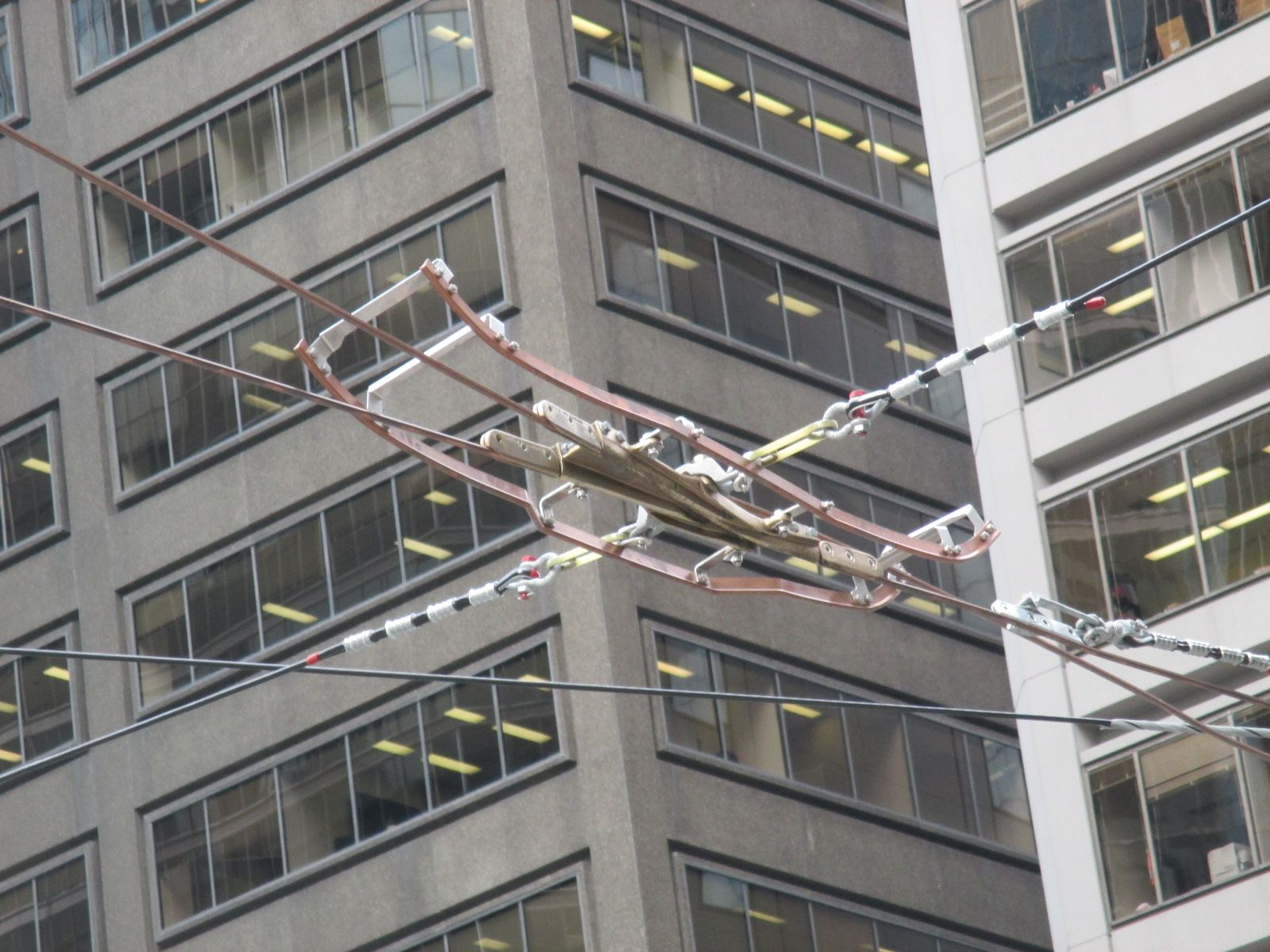
Overhead over a switch in Toronto: Two runners for pantographs flank the trolley pole frog.

Good current collection requires the contact wire geometry to stay within defined limits. This is usually achieved by supporting the contact wire from a second wire known as the messenger wire, or catenary after the natural path of a wire strung between two points. This wire is attached to the contact wire at regular intervals by vertical wires known as "droppers" or "drop wires". It is supported regularly at structures, by a pulley, link or clamp. The whole system is then subjected to mechanical tension.

To extend the useful life of the carbon insert atop the pantograph, the contact wire over straight track is zigzagged slightly to the left and right of the centre from each support to the next so that the insert wears evenly. On curves, the "straight" wire between the supports causes the contact point to cross over the surface of the pantograph as the train travels around the curve. The movement of the contact wire across the head of the pantograph is called the "sweep".

The zigzagging of the overhead line is not required for trolley poles. For tramways, a contact wire without a messenger wire is used.

Depot areas tend to have only a single wire and are known as "simple equipment" or "trolley wire". Early overhead line systems had just one wire, which limited top speeds. To enable higher speeds, two more types of equipment were developed:

- Stitched equipment uses an additional wire at each support structure, terminated on either side of the messenger/catenary wire.
- Compound equipment uses a second support wire, known as the "auxiliary", between the messenger/catenary wire and the contact wire. Droppers support the auxiliary from the messenger wire, while additional droppers support the contact wire from the auxiliary. The auxiliary wire can be of a more conductive but less wear-resistant metal, increasing transmission efficiency.

Earlier dropper wires provided physical support of the contact wire without joining the catenary and contact wires electrically. Modern systems use current-carrying droppers, eliminating the need for separate wires.

The present transmission system originated about 100 years ago. A simpler system was proposed in the 1970s by the Pirelli Construction Company, consisting of a single wire embedded at each support for 2.5 metres (8 ft 2 in) of its length in a clipped, extruded aluminum beam with the wire contact face exposed. A somewhat higher tension than used before clipping the beam yielded a deflected profile for the wire that could be easily handled at 400 km/h (250 mph) by a pneumatic servo pantograph with only 3 g acceleration.

=== Parallel overhead lines ===
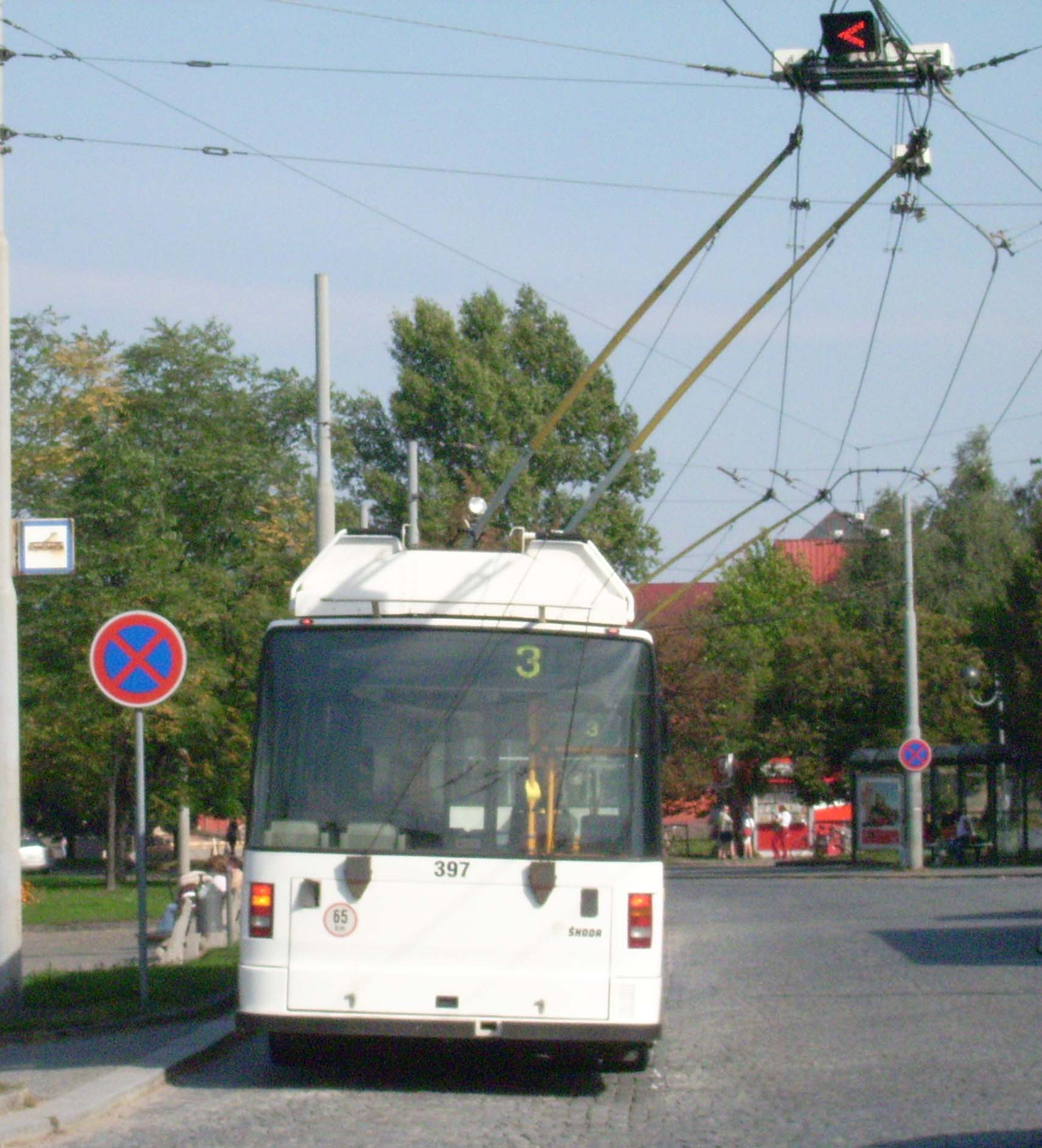
A switch in parallel overhead lines

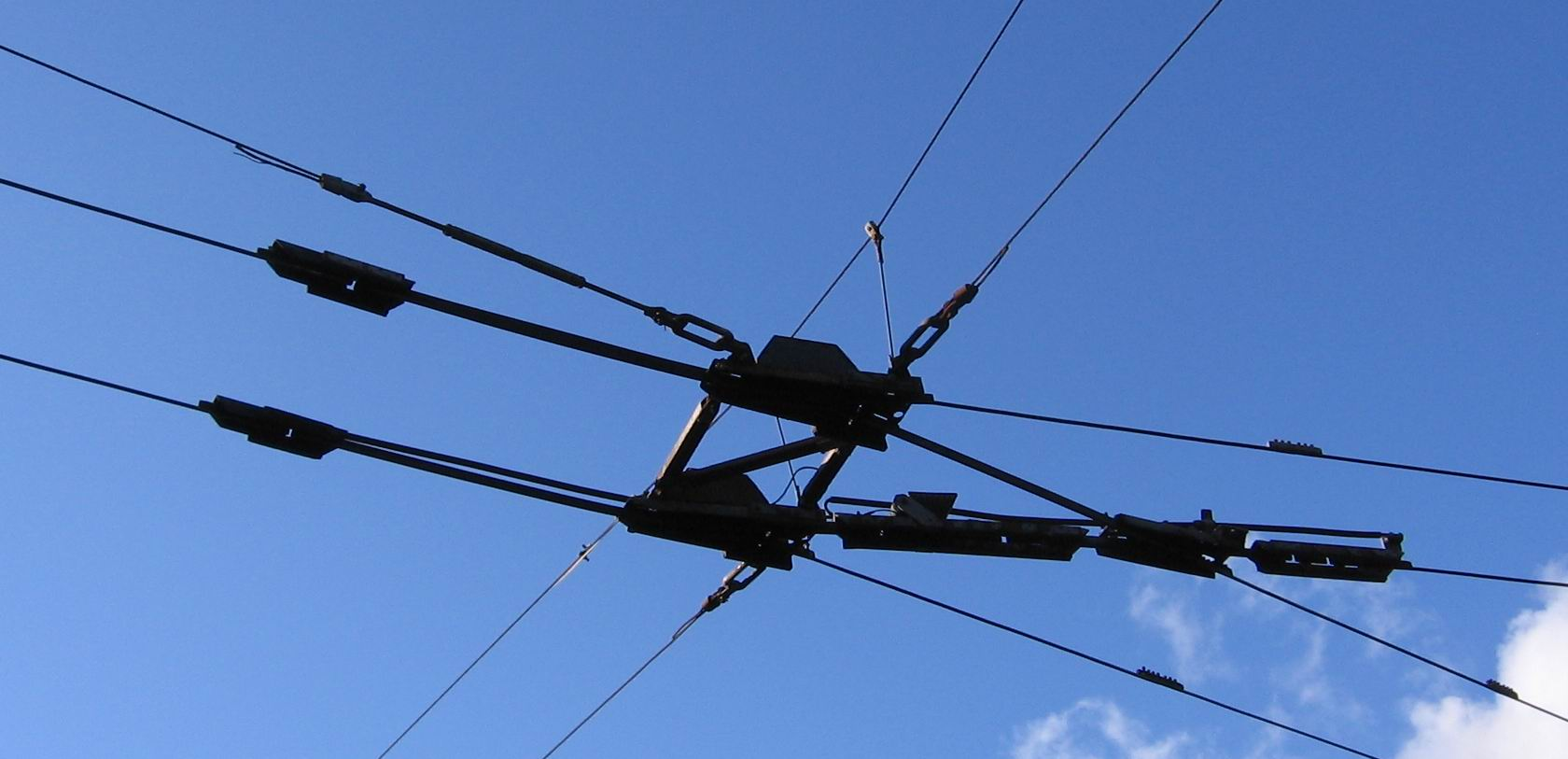
Trolleybus wire switch

An electrical circuit requires at least two conductors. Trams and railways use the overhead line as the positive terminal of the circuit and the steel rails as the negative terminal of the circuit. For a trolleybus or a trolleytruck, no rails are available for the return current, as the vehicles use rubber tyres on the road surface. Trolleybuses use a second parallel overhead line for the return, and two trolley poles, one contacting each overhead wire. (Pantographs are generally incompatible with parallel overhead lines.) The circuit is completed by using both wires. Parallel overhead wires are also used on the rare railways with three-phase AC railway electrification.

== Types of wires ==
In the Soviet Union the following types of wires/cables were used. For the contact wire, cold drawn solid copper was used to ensure good conductivity. The wire is not round but has grooves at the sides to allow the hangers to attach to it. Sizes were (in cross-sectional area) 85, 100, or 150 mm^{2}. To make the wire stronger, 0.04% tin might be added. The wire must resist the heat generated by arcing and thus such wires should never be spliced by thermal means.

The messenger (or catenary) wire needs to be both strong and have good conductivity. They used multi-strand wires (or cables) with 19 strands in each cable (or wire). Copper, aluminum, and/or steel were used for the strands. All 19 strands could be made of the same metal or a mix of metals based on the required properties. For example, steel wires were used for strength, while aluminium or copper wires were used for conductivity. Another type looked like it had all copper wires but inside each wire was a steel core for strength. The steel strands were galvanized but for better corrosion protection they could be coated with an anti-corrosion substance.

In Slovenia, where 3 kV system is in use, standard sizes for contact wire are 100 and 150 mm^{2}. The catenary wire is made of copper or copper alloys of 70, 120 or 150 mm^{2}. The smaller cross sections are made of 19 strands, whereas the bigger has 37 strands. Two standard configurations for main lines consist of two contact wires of 100 mm^{2} and one or two catenary wires of 120 mm^{2}, totaling 320 or 440 mm^{2}. Only one contact wire is often used for side tracks.

In the UK and EU countries, the contact wire is typically made from copper alloyed with other metals. Sizes include cross-sectional areas of 80, 100, 107, 120, and 150 mm^{2}. Common materials include normal and high strength copper, copper-silver, copper-cadmium, copper-magnesium, and copper-tin, with each being identifiable by distinct identification grooves along the upper lobe of the contact wire. These grooves vary in number and location on the arc of the upper section. Copper is chosen for its excellent conductivity, with other metals added to increase tensile strength. The choice of material is chosen based on the needs of the particular system, balancing the need for conductivity and tensile strength.

== Tensioning ==
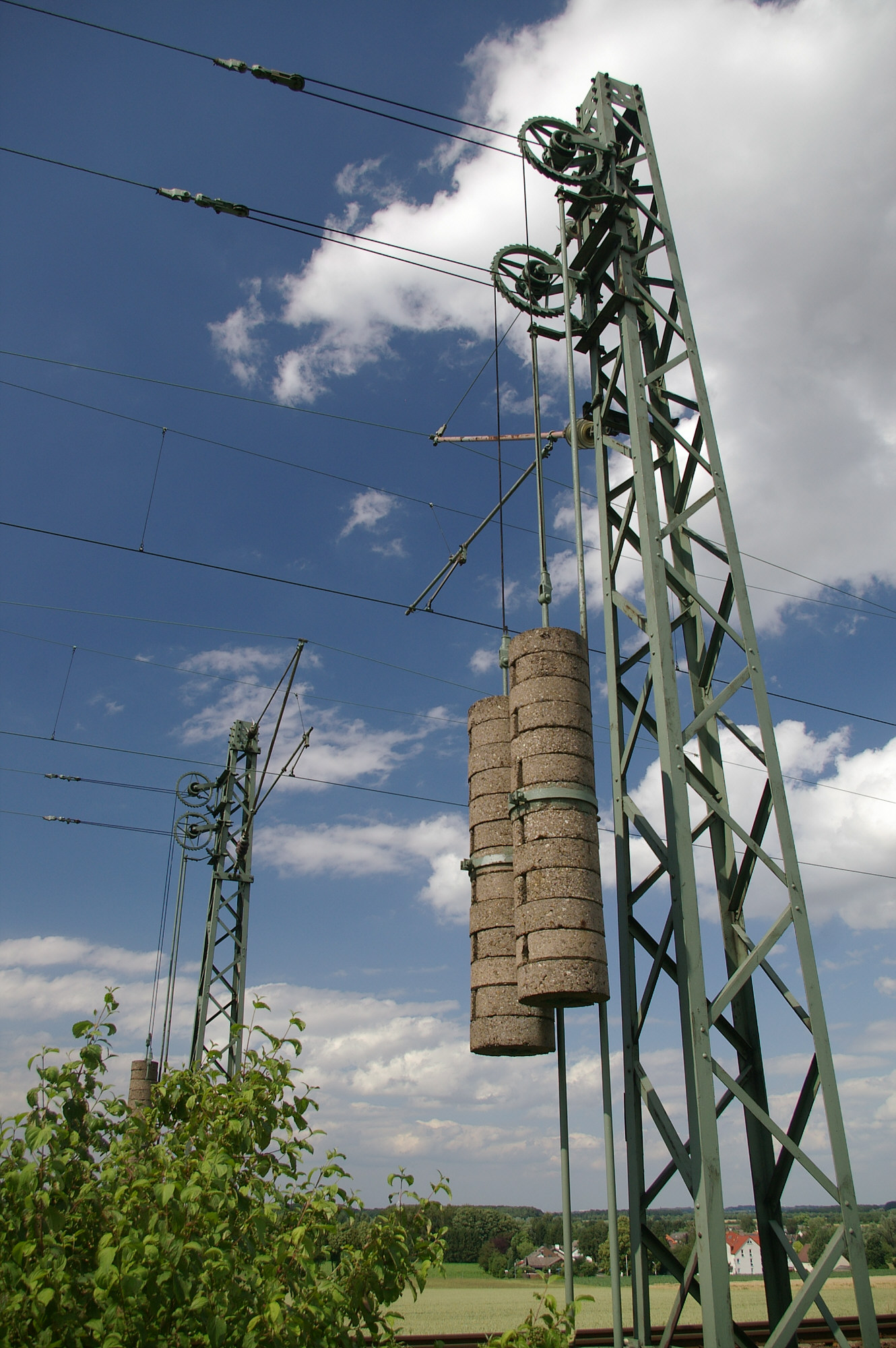
Line tensioning in Germany

Catenary wires are kept in mechanical tension because the pantograph causes mechanical oscillations in the wire. The waves must travel faster than the train to avoid producing standing waves, which could break the wire. Tensioning the line makes waves travel faster, and also reduces sag from gravity.

For medium and high speeds, the wires are generally tensioned by weights or occasionally by hydraulic tensioners. Either method is known as "auto-tensioning" (AT) or "constant tension" and ensures that the tension is virtually independent of temperature. Tensions are typically between 9 and 20 kN (2,000 and 4,500 lbf) per wire. Where weights are used, they slide up and down on a rod or tube attached to the mast, to prevent them from swaying. Recently, spring tensioners have started to be used. These devices contain a torsional spring with a cam arrangement to ensure a constant applied tension (instead of varying proportionally with extension). Some devices also include mechanisms for adjusting the stiffness of the spring for ease of maintenance.

For low speeds and in tunnels where temperatures are constant, fixed termination (FT) equipment may be used, with the wires terminated directly on structures at each end of the overhead line. The tension is generally about 10 kN (2,200 lbf). This type of equipment sags in hot conditions and is taut in cold conditions.

With AT, the continuous length of the overhead line is limited due to the change in the height of the weights as the overhead line expands and contracts with temperature changes. This movement is proportional to the distance between anchors. Tension length has a maximum. For most 25 kV OHL equipment in the UK, the maximum tension length is 1,970 m (6,460 ft).

An additional issue with AT equipment is that, if balance weights are attached to both ends, the whole tension length is free to move along the track. To avoid this a midpoint anchor (MPA), close to the centre of the tension length, restricts movement of the messenger/catenary wire by anchoring it; the contact wire and its suspension hangers can move only within the constraints of the MPA. MPAs are sometimes fixed to low bridges, or otherwise anchored to vertical catenary poles or portal catenary supports. A tension length can be seen as a fixed centre point, with the two half-tension lengths expanding and contracting with temperature.

Most systems include a brake to stop the wires from unravelling completely if a wire breaks or tension is lost. German systems usually use a single large tensioning pulley (basically a ratchet mechanism) with a toothed rim, mounted on an arm hinged to the mast. Normally the downward pull of the weights and the reactive upward pull of the tensioned wires lift the pulley so its teeth are well clear of a stop on the mast. The pulley can turn freely while the weights move up or down as the wires contract or expand. If tension is lost the pulley falls back toward the mast, and one of its teeth jams against the stop. This stops further rotation, limits the damage, and keeps the undamaged part of the wire intact until it can be repaired. Other systems use various braking mechanisms, usually with multiple smaller pulleys in a block and tackle arrangement.

== Breaks ==
Lines are divided into sections to limit the scope of an outage and to allow maintenance.

=== Section break ===
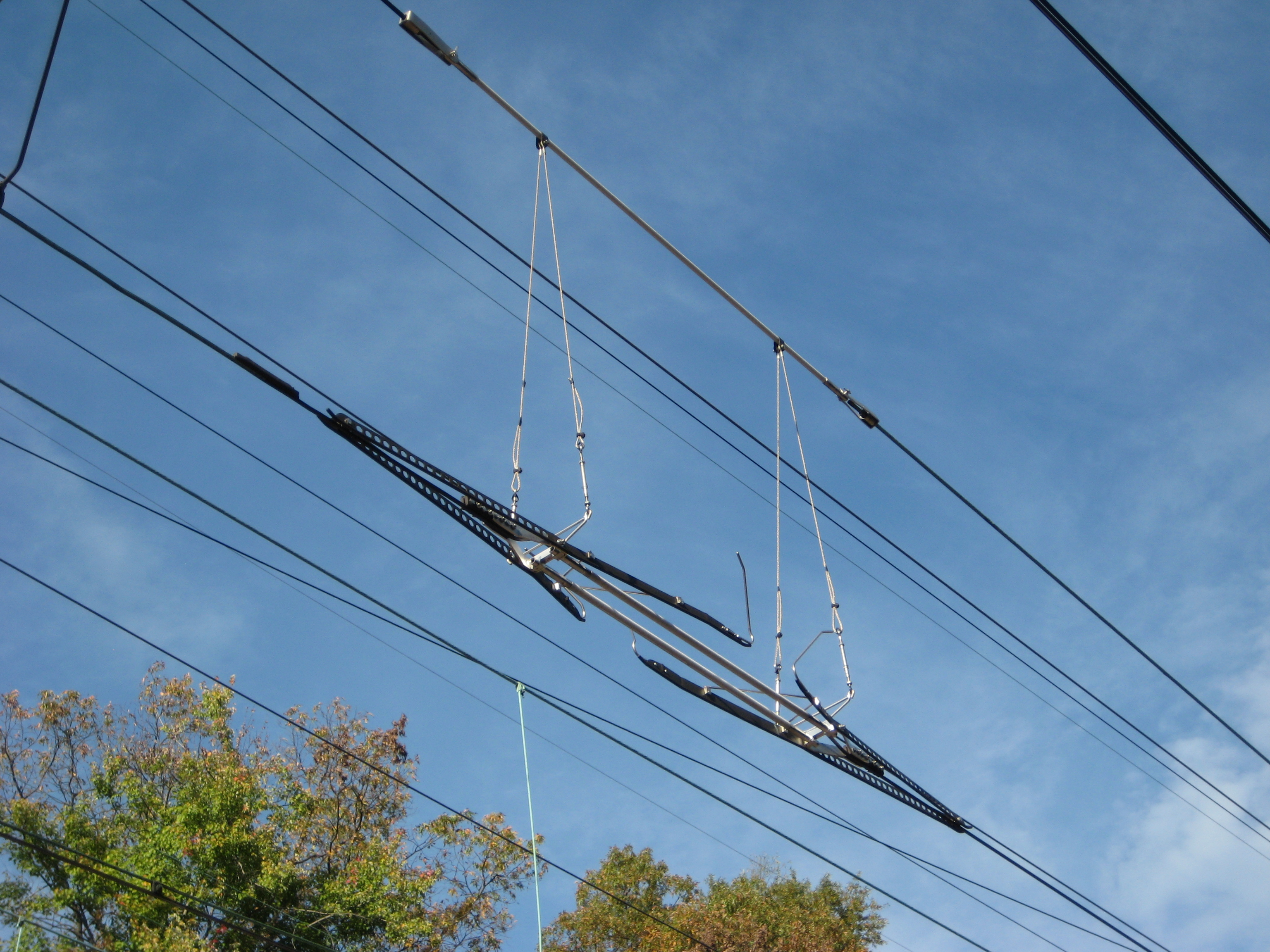
A section insulator at a section break in Amtrak's 12 kV catenary

To allow maintenance to the overhead line without having to turn off the entire system, the line is broken into electrically separated portions known as "sections". Sections often correspond with tension lengths. The transition from section to section is known as a "section break" and is set up so that the vehicle's pantograph is in continuous contact with one wire or the other.

For bow collectors and pantographs, this is done by having two contact wires run side by side over the length between 2 or 4 wire supports. A new one drops down and the old one rises up, allowing the pantograph to smoothly transfer from one to the other. The two wires do not touch (although the bow collector or pantograph is briefly in contact with both wires). In normal service, the two sections are electrically connected; depending on the system this might be an isolator, fixed contact or a Booster Transformer. The isolator allows the current to the section to be interrupted for maintenance.

On overhead wires designed for trolley poles, this is done by having a neutral section between the wires, requiring an insulator. The driver of the tram or trolleybus must temporarily reduce the power draw before the trolley pole passes through, to prevent arc damage to the insulator.

Pantograph-equipped locomotives must not run through a section break when one side is de-energized. The locomotive would become trapped, but as it passes the section break the pantograph briefly shorts the two catenary lines. If the opposite line is de-energized, this voltage transient may trip supply breakers. If the line is under maintenance, an injury may occur as the catenary is suddenly energized. Even if the catenary is properly grounded to protect the personnel, the arc generated across the pantograph can damage the pantograph, the catenary insulator or both.

=== Neutral section (phase break) ===
Neutral Section Indication Board used on railways in the UK. Six of these would be required at crossings

A pantograph of EMU passes neutral section of 25 kV 50 Hz AC overhead line without lowering but with switching off a circuit breaker

Sometimes on a larger electrified railway, tramway or trolleybus system, it is necessary to power different areas of track from different power grids, without guaranteeing synchronisation of the phases. Long lines may be connected to the country's national grid at various points and different phases. (Sometimes the sections are powered with different voltages or frequencies.) The grids may be synchronised on a normal basis, but events may interrupt synchronisation. This is not a problem for DC systems. AC systems have a particular safety implication in that the railway electrification system would act as a "Backdoor" connection between different parts, resulting in, amongst other things, a section of the grid de-energised for maintenance being re-energised from the railway substation creating danger.

For these reasons, Neutral sections are placed in the electrification between the sections fed from different points in a national grid, or different phases, or grids that are not synchronized. It is highly undesirable to connect unsynchronized grids. A simple section break is insufficient to guard against this as the pantograph briefly connects both sections.

In countries such as France, South Africa, Australia and the United Kingdom, a pair of permanent magnets beside the rails at either side of the neutral section operate a bogie-mounted transducer on the train which causes a large electrical circuit-breaker to open and close when the locomotive or the pantograph vehicle of a multiple unit passes over them. In the United Kingdom equipment similar to Automatic Warning System (AWS) is used, but with pairs of magnets placed outside the running rails (as opposed to the AWS magnets placed midway between the rails). Lineside signs on the approach to the neutral section warn the driver to shut off traction power and coast through the dead section.

A neutral section or phase break consists of two insulated breaks back-to-back with a short section of line that belongs to neither grid. Some systems increase the level of safety by the midpoint of the neutral section being earthed. The presence of the earthed section in the middle is to ensure that should the transducer controlled apparatus fail, and the driver also fail to shut off power, the energy in the arc struck by the pantograph as it passes to the neutral section is conducted to earth, operating substation circuit breakers, rather than the arc either bridging the insulators into a section made dead for maintenance, a section fed from a different phase, or setting up a Backdoor connection between different parts of the country's national grid.

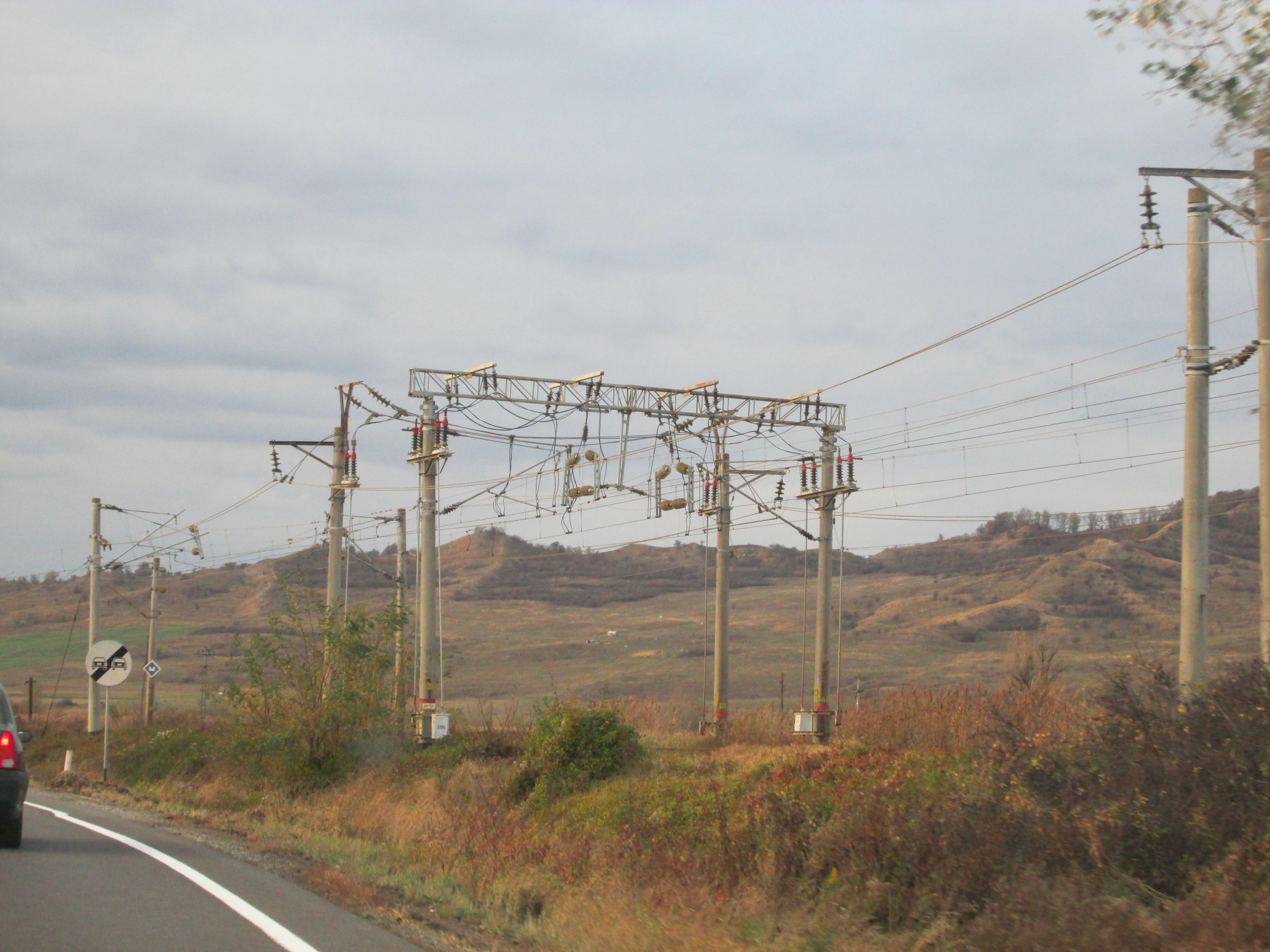
25 kV AC neutral zone in Romania

On the Pennsylvania Railroad, phase breaks were indicated by a position light signal face with all eight radial positions with lenses and no center light. When the phase break was active (the catenary sections out of phase), all lights were lit. The position light signal aspect was originally devised by the Pennsylvania Railroad and was continued by Amtrak and adopted by Metro North. Metal signs were hung from the catenary supports with the letters "PB" created by a pattern of drilled holes.

=== Dead section ===
A special category of phase break was developed in America, primarily by the Pennsylvania Railroad. Since its traction power network was centrally supplied and only segmented by abnormal conditions, normal phase breaks were generally not active. Phase breaks that were always activated were known as "Dead Sections": they were often used to separate power systems (for example, the Hell Gate Bridge boundary between Amtrak and Metro North's electrifications) that would never be in-phase. Since a dead section is always dead, no special signal aspect was developed to warn drivers of its presence, and a metal sign with "DS" in drilled-hole letters was hung from the catenary supports.

=== Gaps ===
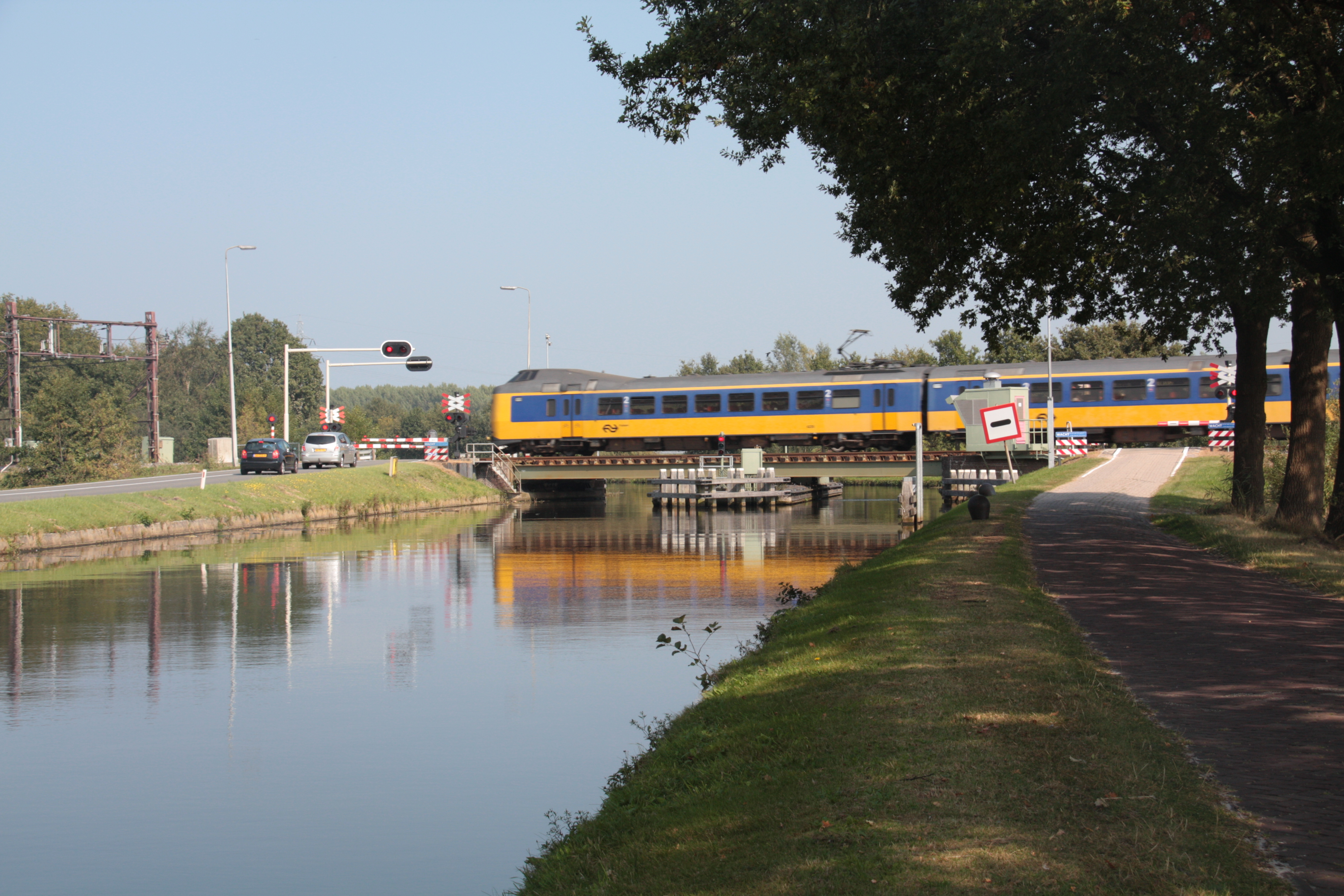
A swing bridge near Meppel, the Netherlands. There is no overhead line on the bridge; the train coasts through with raised pantograph.

Occasionally gaps may be present in the overhead lines, when switching from one voltage to another or to provide clearance for ships at moveable bridges, as a simpler alternative for moveable overhead power rails. Electric trains coast across the gaps. To prevent arcing, power must be switched off before reaching the gap and usually the pantograph would be lowered.

== Overhead conductor rails ==
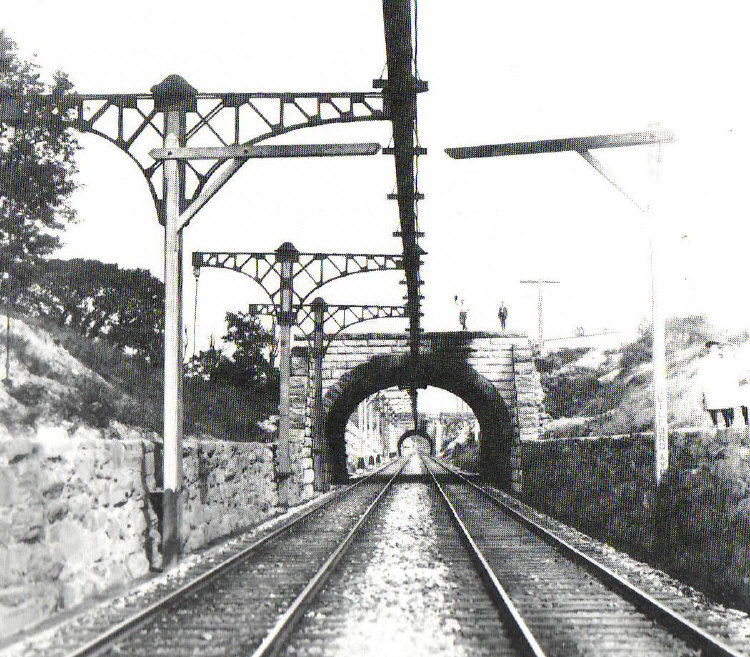
B&O's overhead third-rail system at Guilford Avenue in Baltimore, 1901, part of the Baltimore Belt Line. The central position of the overhead conductors was dictated by the many tunnels on the line: the ∩-shaped rails were located at the highest point in the roof to give the most clearance.

Given limited clearance such as in tunnels, the overhead wire may be replaced by a rigid overhead rail. An early example was in the tunnels of the Baltimore Belt Line, where a Π section bar (fabricated from three strips of iron and mounted on wood) was used, with the brass contact running inside the groove. When the overhead line was raised in the Simplon Tunnel to accommodate taller rolling stock, a rail was used. A rigid overhead rail may also be used in places where tensioning the wires is impractical, for example on moveable bridges. In modern uses, it is very common for underground sections of trams, metros, and mainline railways to use a rigid overhead wire in their tunnels, while using normal overhead wires in their above ground sections.

Operation of the overhead conductor rails at Shaw's Cove Railroad Bridge in Connecticut

In a movable bridge that uses a rigid overhead rail, there is a need to transition from the catenary wire system into an overhead conductor rail at the bridge portal (the last traction current pylon before the movable bridge). For example, the power supply can be done through a catenary wire system near a swing bridge. The catenary wire typically comprises messenger wire (also called catenary wire) and a contact wire where it meets the pantograph. The messenger wire is terminated at the portal, while the contact wire runs into the overhead conductor rail profile at the transition end section before it is terminated at the portal. There is a gap between the overhead conductor rail at the transition end section and the overhead conductor rail that runs across the entire span of the swing bridge. The gap is required for the swing bridge to be opened and closed. To connect the conductor rails together when the bridge is closed, there is another conductor rail section called "rotary overlap" that is equipped with a motor. When the bridge is fully closed, the motor of the rotary overlap is operated to turn it from a tilted position into the horizontal position, connecting the conductor rails at the transition end section and the bridge together to supply power.

Short overhead conductor rails are installed at tram stops as for the Combino Supra.

== Crossings ==
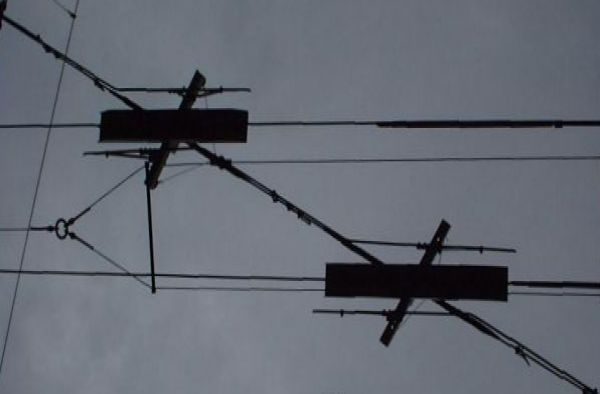
Tram overhead wire (diagonal) crossing trolleybus wires (horizontal), photographed in Bahnhofplatz, Bern, Switzerland

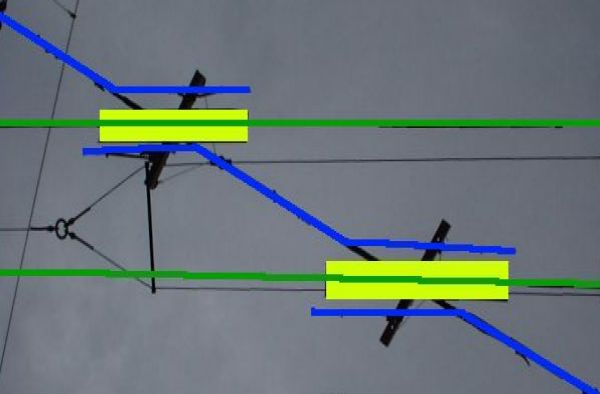
Annotated version of the previous photo, highlighting components tram conductor trolley bus wires insulated trough

Trams draw their power from a single overhead wire at about 500 to 750 V DC. Trolleybuses draw from two overhead wires at a similar voltage, and at least one of the trolleybus wires must be insulated from tram wires. This is usually done by the trolleybus wires running continuously through the crossing, with the tram conductors a few centimetres lower. Close to the junction on each side, the tram wire turns into a solid bar running parallel to the trolleybus wires for about half a metre. Another bar similarly angled at its ends is hung between the trolleybus wires, electrically connected above to the tram wire. The tram's pantograph bridges the gap between the different conductors, providing it with a continuous pickup.

Where the tram wire crosses, the trolleybus wires are protected by an inverted trough of insulating material extending 20 or 30 mm (0.79 or 1.18 in) below.

Until 1946, a level crossing in Stockholm, Sweden connected the railway south of Stockholm Central Station and a tramway. The tramway operated on 600–700 V DC and the railway on 15 kV AC. In the Swiss village of Oberentfelden, the Menziken–Aarau–Schöftland line operating at 750 V DC crosses the SBB line at 15 kV AC; there used to be a similar crossing between the two lines at Suhr but this was replaced by an underpass in 2010. Some crossings between tramway/light rail and railways are extant in Germany. In Zürich, Switzerland, VBZ trolleybus line 32 has a level crossing with the 1,200 V DC Uetliberg railway line; at many places, trolleybus lines cross the tramway. In some cities, trolleybuses and trams shared a positive (feed) wire. In such cases, a normal trolleybus frog can be used.

Alternatively, section breaks can be sited at the crossing point, so that the crossing is electrically dead.

=== Australia ===
Many cities had trams and trolleybuses using trolley poles. They used insulated crossovers, which required tram drivers to put the controller into neutral and coast through. Trolleybus drivers had to either lift off the accelerator or switch to auxiliary power.

In Melbourne, Victoria, tram drivers put the controller into neutral and coast through section insulators, indicated by insulator markings between the rails.

Melbourne has several remaining level crossings between electrified suburban railways and tram lines. They have mechanical switching arrangements (changeover switch) to switch the 1500 V DC overhead of the railway and the 650 V DC of the trams, called a Tram Square. Several such crossings have been grade separated in recent years as part of the Level Crossing Removal Project.

=== Greece ===
Athens has two crossings of tram and trolleybus wires, at Vas. Amalias Avenue and Vas. Olgas Avenue, and at Ardittou Street and Athanasiou Diakou Street. They use the above-mentioned solution.

=== Italy ===
In Rome, at the crossing between Viale Regina Margherita and Via Nomentana, tram and trolleybus lines cross: tram on Viale Regina Margherita and trolleybus on Via Nomentana. The crossing is orthogonal, therefore the typical arrangement was not available.

In Milan, most tram lines cross its circular trolleybus line once or twice. Trolleybus and tram wires run parallel in streets such as viale Stelvio, viale Umbria and viale Tibaldi.

== Multiple overhead lines ==
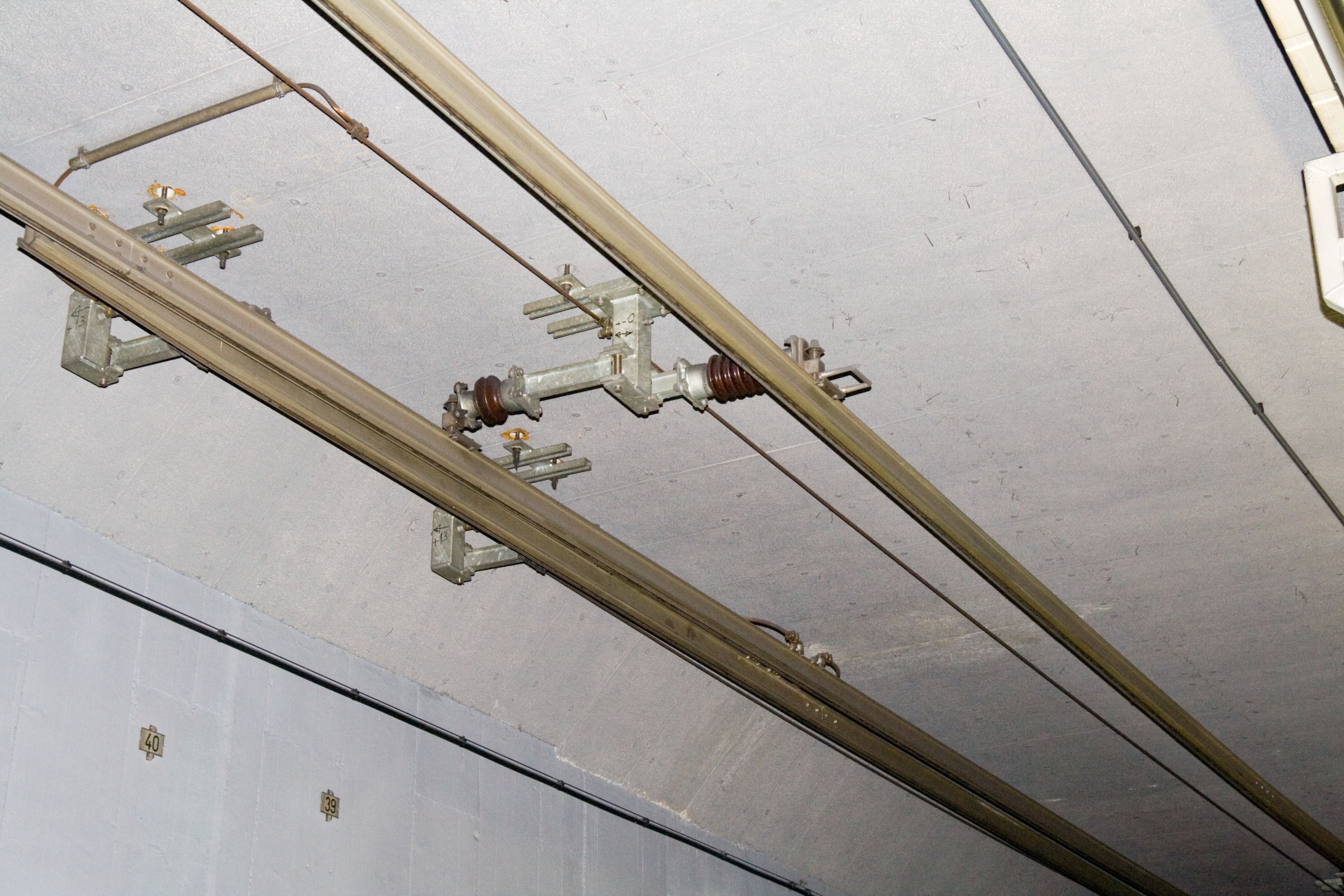
Two overhead conductor rails for the same track. Left, 1,200 V DC for the Uetliberg railway (the pantograph is mounted asymmetrically to collect current from this rail); right, 15 kV AC for the Sihltal railway

Some railways used two or three overhead lines, usually to carry three-phase current. This is used only on the Gornergrat Railway and Jungfrau Railway in Switzerland, the Petit train de la Rhune in France, and the Corcovado Rack Railway in Brazil. Until 1976, it was widely used in Italy. On these railways, the two conductors are used for two different phases of the three-phase AC, while the rail was used for the third phase. The neutral was not used.

Some three-phase AC railways used three overhead wires. These were an experimental railway line of Siemens in Berlin-Lichtenberg in 1898 (length 1.8 kilometres (1.1 mi)), the military railway between Marienfelde and Zossen between 1901 and 1904 (length 23.4 kilometres (14.5 mi)) and an 800-metre (2,600 ft)-long section of a coal railway near Cologne between 1940 and 1949.

On DC systems, bipolar overhead lines were sometimes used to avoid galvanic corrosion of metallic parts near the railway, such as on the Chemin de fer de la Mure.

All systems with multiple overhead lines have a high risk of short circuits at switches and therefore tend to be impractical in use, especially when high voltages are used or when trains run through the points at high speed.

The Sihltal Zürich Uetliberg Bahn had two lines with different electrification. To be able to use different electric systems on shared tracks, the Sihltal line had its overhead wire right above the train, whilst the Uetliberg line had its overhead wire off to one side. This configuration was used up until summer 2022, since then the Uetliberg line has been switched to the standard 15kV 16.7 Hz configuration.

== Overhead catenary ==
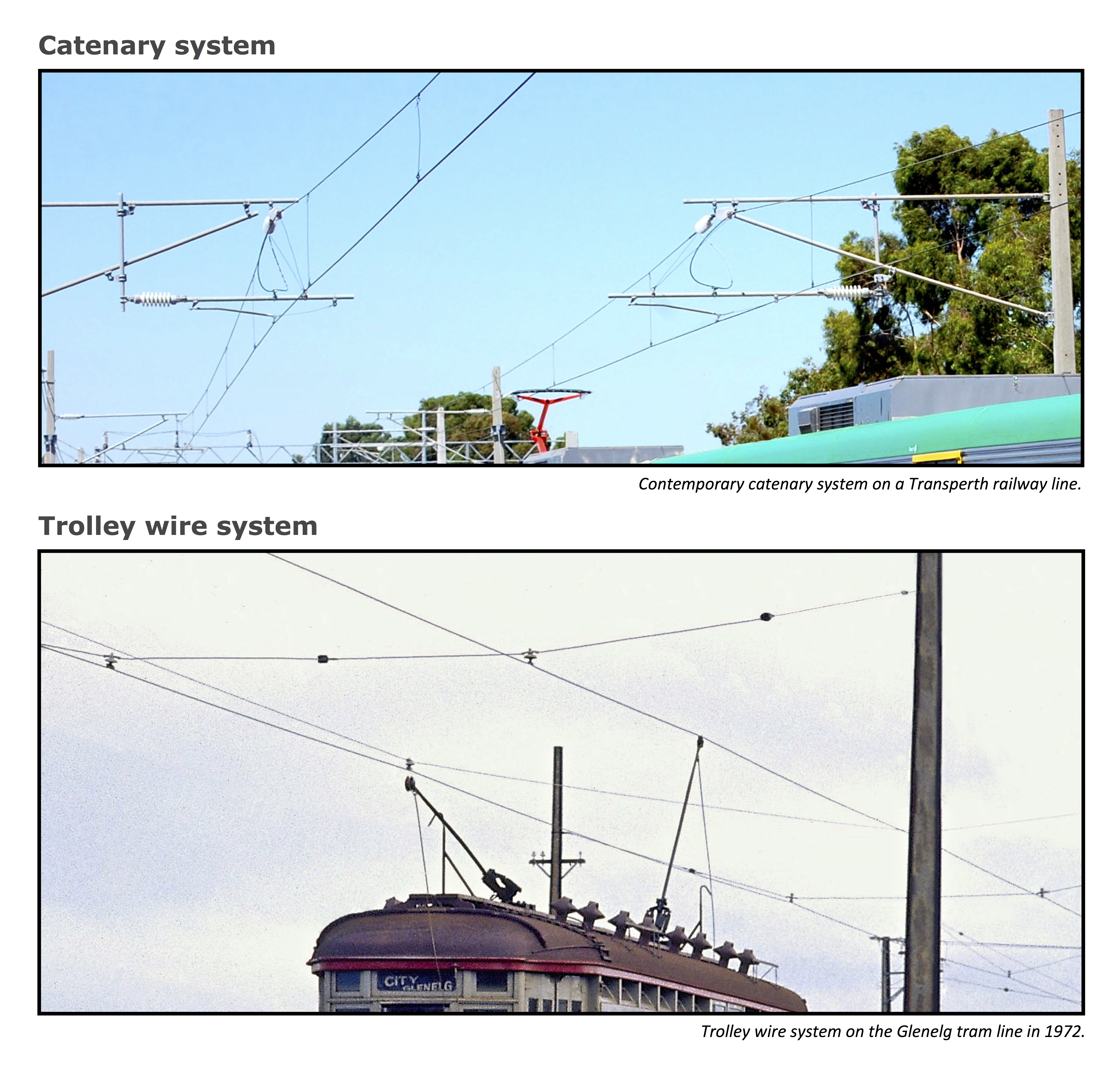
Catenary (upper photo) is suited to higher-speed rail vehicles. Trolley wire (lower photo) is suited to slower-speed trams (streetcars) and light rail vehicles.

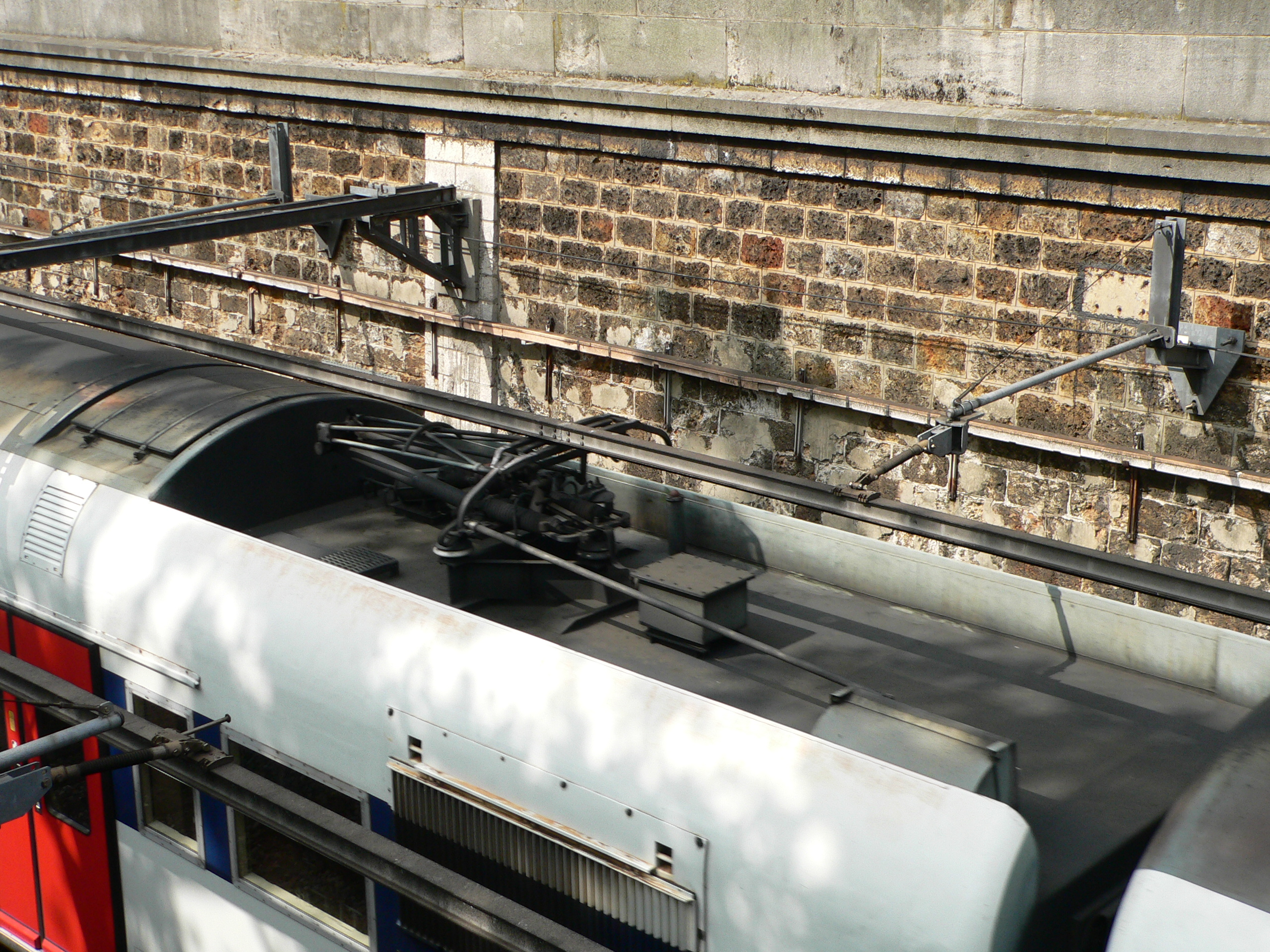
Overhead feeding rail on the RER Line C trenches and tunnels in central Paris

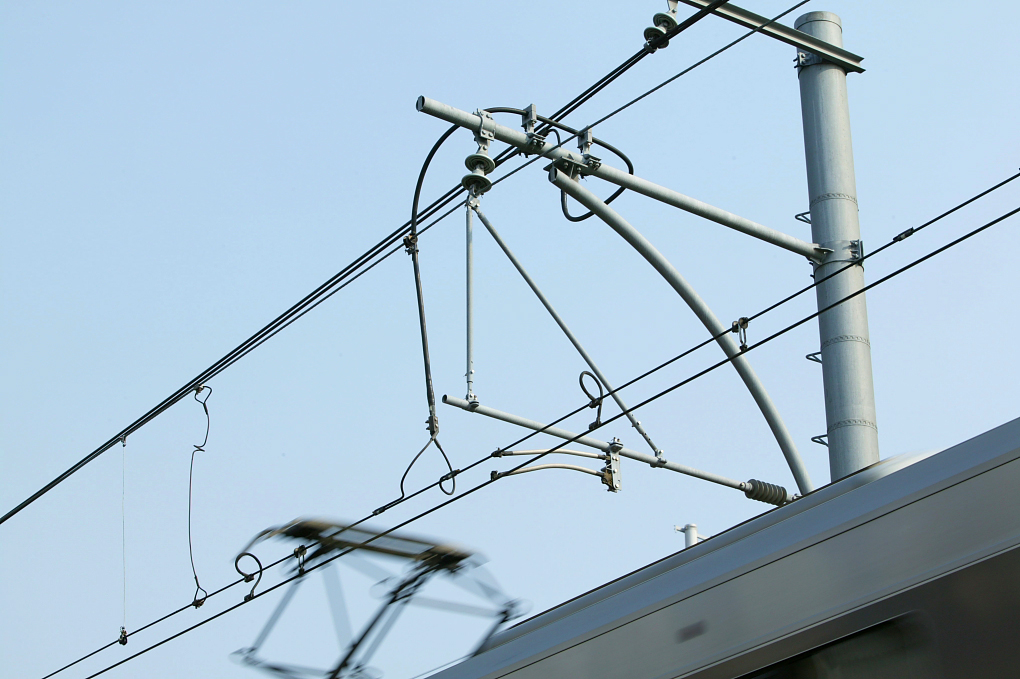
Compound catenary equipment of JR West

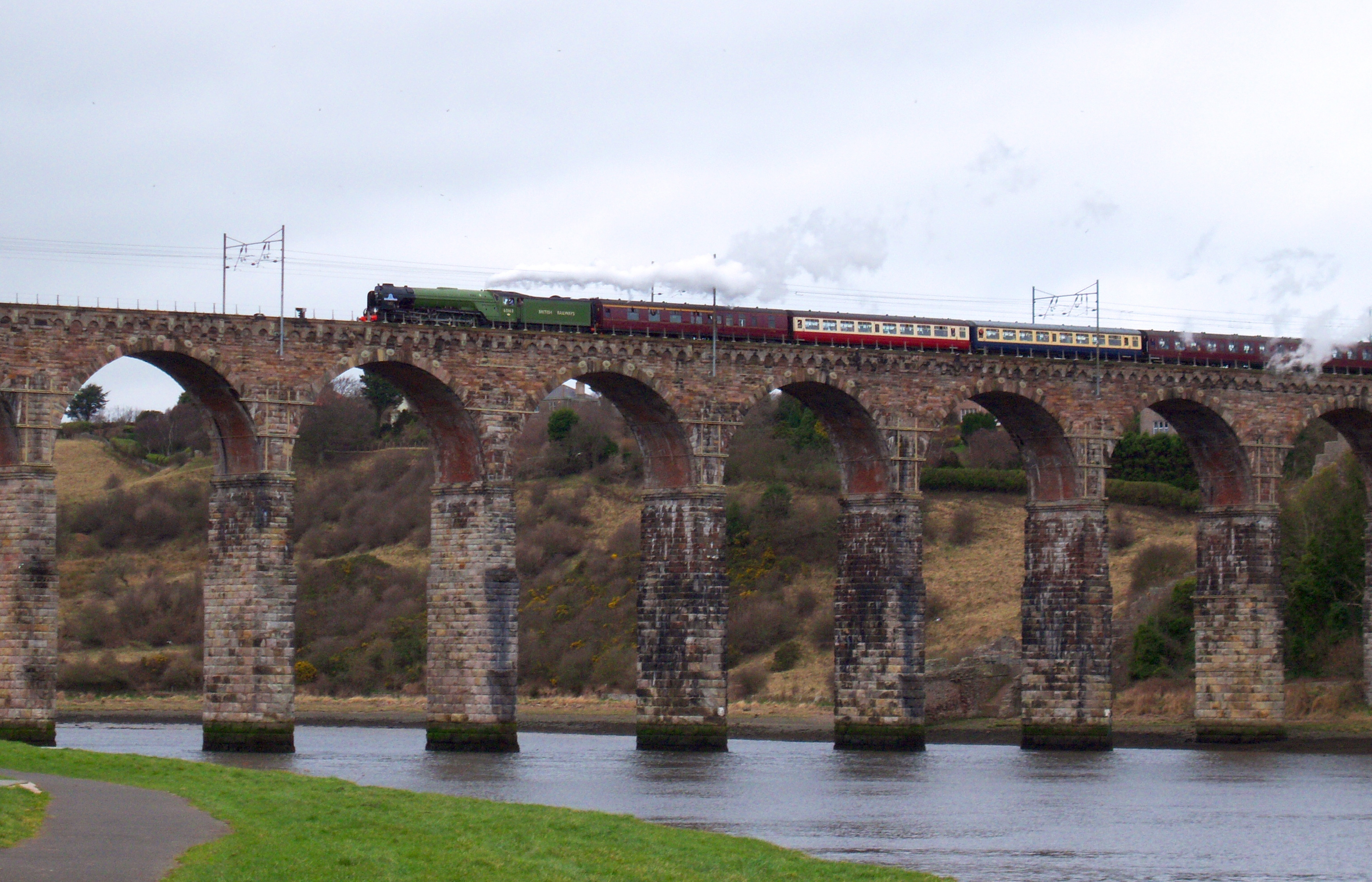
An older rail bridge in Berwick-upon-Tweed, retrofitted to include overhead catenary lines

A catenary is a system of overhead wires used to supply electricity to a locomotive, tram (streetcar), or light rail vehicle that is equipped with a pantograph.

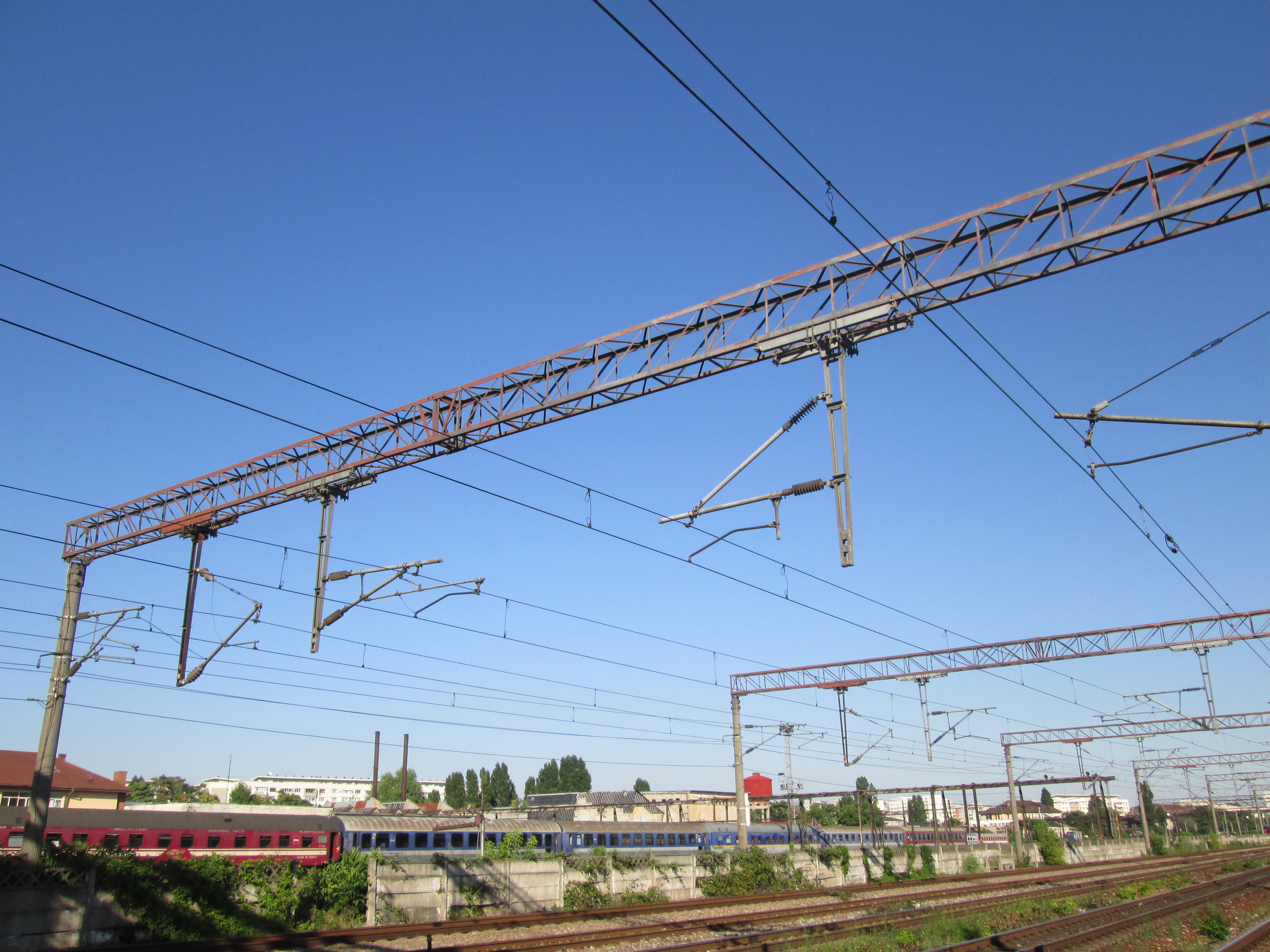
Gantry with old and new suspended equipment at Grivita railway station, Bucharest

Unlike simple overhead wires, in which the uninsulated wire is attached by clamps to closely spaced crosswires supported by poles, catenary systems use at least two wires. The catenary or messenger wire is hung at a specific tension between line structures, and a second wire is held in tension by the messenger wire, attached to it at frequent intervals by clamps and connecting wires known as droppers. The second wire is straight and level, parallel to the rail track, suspended over it as the roadway of a suspension bridge is over water.

Catenary systems are suited to high-speed operations whereas simple wire systems, which are less expensive to build and maintain, are common on light rail or tram (streetcar) lines, especially on city streets. Such vehicles can be fitted with either a pantograph or trolley pole.

=== Electrification support structures ===
Various methods are used to support overhead line equipment. These must provide support (vertical position of catenary and contact wires) and registration (horizontal position of catenary and contact wires). The metal parts that provide OLE registration are typically designed to adjust in the vertical plane as the pantograph moves under it. These are often designed to allow mechanically independent registration, in which each contact and catenary wire for each track is mechanically independent from the adjacent wire runs.

The generic types of support structures are summarised below.

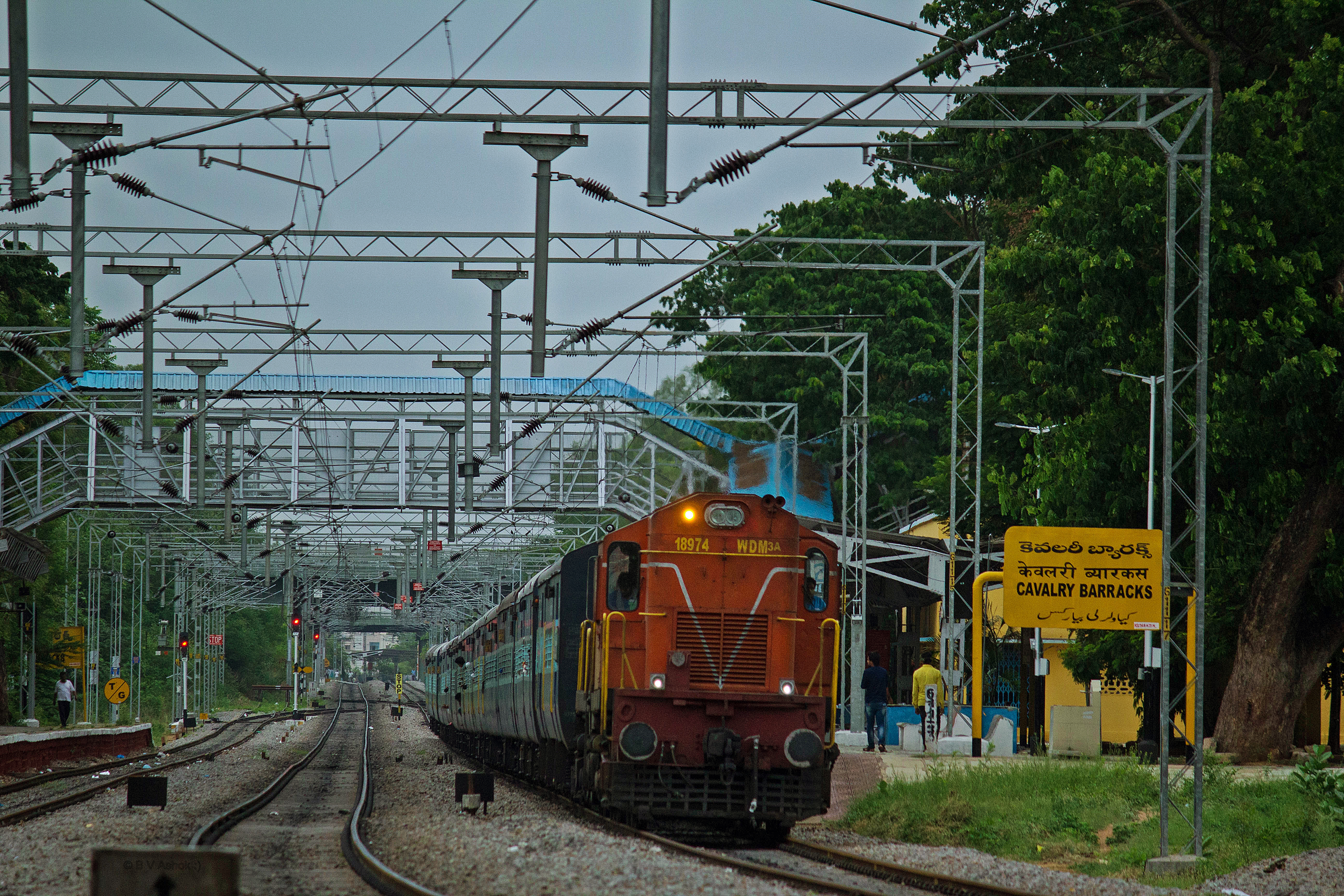
Gantry structures to support overhead lines in Hyderabad, India

- Single Cantilever
  - The most basic and common type of OLE structure that supports and registers one wire run above one track.
- Double Cantilever
  - Similar to the previous but with two cantilever arms adjacent to each other on one mast. Often used where two wire runs converge.
- Back to Back Cantilever
  - Two wire runs over two tracks supported and registered by one mast placed in the centre of the tracks with cantilever arms attached to opposite sides. Frequently used on tram and light rail systems but can appear on heavy rail lines.
- Two Track Cantilever (TTC)
  - Two wire runs over two tracks supported by one mast with a boom structure extending over to the second track. TTCs typically provide mechanically independent registration, but subtypes exists called the "span-wire two track cantilever" which has both registration arms mechanically linked. TTCs are often used where there are poor ground conditions or obstructions on one side of a two track railway. They are also sometimes used to minimised piling since only one track must be taken out of service for this phase of construction.
- Portals
  - Also known generically as "gantries", portals are large structures with masts on either side and a fixed steel beam between them. They are frequently used on sections of railway line with more than two tracks. Portals typically provide mechanically independent registration, however variants exist with registration span-wires that mechanically link adjacent wire runs. Portals are sometimes used on two track railways over bridges and viaducts or where ground conditions are poor. This is because portals inflict fewer rotational forces on their foundations.
- Headspans
  - An alternative method to supporting multi-track areas, headspans consist of a mast at either side of the railway and various cables running horizontally between the two masts (called span wires) to support and register all wire runs at tension. Because the tension of all wire runs and span wires are required simultaneously to hold up the OLE wires, headspans by definition do not provide mechanically independent registration and a failure of one OLE or span wire will bring all wire runs out of geometric limits. Headspans are cheaper and less obtrusive than portals and so are well suited to low speed complex multitrack areas like stations, station approaches, depots and sidings, and areas where visual intrusion is an important consideration. They are also capable of supporting tracks with speeds up to 200km/h (125mph) but provide significant reliability disadvantages over portals or TTCs for this application.

Tunnels, low overbridges and other location specific features (retaining walls, adjacent rockfaces etc) frequently require bespoke OLE structures that may incorporate some features of the generic types above.

=== Overhead catenary systems in the United States ===
Amtrak's Northeast Corridor in the United States has catenary over the 600 miles (970 km) between Boston, Massachusetts, and Washington, D.C., for inter-city trains. Commuter rail agencies including MARC, SEPTA, NJ Transit, and Metro-North Railroad use the catenary to provide local service. Amtrak's Keystone Corridor is electrified on the 104 miles (167 km) stretch between Philadelphia and Harrisburg, Pennsylvania, which sees intercity service between New York City and Harrisburg via Philadelphia, as well as SEPTA commuter trains.

New Jersey Transit operates a network of electrified rail lines originating at Hoboken Terminal and New York's Penn Station; including the North Jersey Coast Line (up to Long Branch), Morristown Line (up to Dover), Montclair-Boonton Line (up to Hackettstown via diesel transfer or electric to Montclair/Great Notch), and the Gladstone Branch. NJT also operates a short 2.7-mile spur between Princeton Junction and Princeton, New Jersey, known as the Princeton Branch.

In the Philadelphia metropolitan area, SEPTA operates an extensive network of 13 electrified rail lines originating at 30th Street Station in Philadelphia, totaling 280 miles (450 km).

In Cleveland, Ohio, interurban/light rail lines and a heavy rail line use the same overhead wires, due to a city ordinance intended to limit air pollution from the large number of steam trains that passed through Cleveland between the east coast and Chicago. Trains switched from steam to electric locomotives at the Collinwood railyards about 10 miles (16 km) east of Downtown and at Linndale on the west side. When Cleveland constructed its rapid transit (heavy rail) line between the airport, downtown, and beyond, it employed a similar catenary, using electrification equipment left over after railroads switched from steam to diesel. Light and heavy rail share trackage for about 3 miles (4.8 km) along the Cleveland Hopkins International Airport Red (heavy rail) line, Blue and Green interurban/light rail lines between Cleveland Union Terminal and just past East 55th Street station, where the lines separate. Electrified heavy rail operations are set to be phased out beginning in 2026 with the introduction of light rail vehicles on the RTA Red Line

Part of Boston's Blue Line through the northeast suburbs uses overhead lines, as does the Green Line.

In the Chicago metropolitan area, both Metra and NICTD have a network of electrified commuter lines originating at Millennium Station. The electrification extends South Bend and Munster in Indiana, as well as Blue Island and University Park in Illinois. The Yellow Line on the Chicago "L" used an overhead catenary system for the west half of the route, switching to third rail for the east half. This was discontinued in 2004 when the entire route was converted to third rail.

Denver's RTD operates a mixture of 4 electrified heavy rail and 6 light rail rapid transit lines throughout the Denver metropolitan area, totalling 113.1 miles (182.0 km) of track.

On the San Francisco Peninsula in California, the Caltrain commuter rail system completed the installation of an overhead contact system (OCS) in 2023, to prepare for the conversion of its 160-year old San Francisco-to-San José Peninsula Corridor to fully electrified service in September 2024.

== Problems with overhead equipment ==
Overhead lines may be damaged by strong winds. Lightning can hit overhead wires or supporting systems, stopping trains with a power surge.

During cold or frosty weather, ice may coat overhead lines. This can result in poor electrical contact between the collector and the overhead line, resulting in electrical arcing and power surges. Ice coatings also add extra weight, as well as increase their surface area exposed to wind, consequently increasing the load on the wires and their supports.

Lines may sag during hot weather and if a pantograph gets entangled, this can result in a dewirement. Similarly, in very cold weather they may contract and snap.

The installation of overhead lines may require reconstruction of bridges to provide safe electrical clearance.

Overhead lines, like most electrified systems, require a greater capital expenditure when building the system than an equivalent non-electric system. While a unelectrified railway line requires only the grade, ballast, ties and rails, an overhead system also requires a complex system of support structures, lines, insulators, power-control systems and power lines, all of which require maintenance. This makes non-electrical systems more attractive in the short term, although electrical systems can pay for themselves eventually. Also, the added construction and maintenance cost-per-mile makes overhead systems less attractive on already existing long-distance railways, such as those found in North America, where the distances between cities are typically far greater than in Europe. Such long lines require enormous investment in overhead line equipment, which private rail companies are unlikely to be interested in, and major difficulties confront energizing long portions of overhead wire on a permanent basis, especially in areas where energy demand already outstrips supply.

Many people consider overhead lines to be "visual pollution", due to the many support structures and complicated system of wires and cables that fill the air. Such considerations have driven the move towards replacing overhead power and communications lines with buried cables where possible. The issue came to a head in the UK with the Great Western Main Line electrification scheme, especially through the Goring Gap. A protest group with their own website has been formed.

The valuable copper conductor can also be subject to theft, as for example the Lahore-Khanewal line in Pakistan and the Gweru-Harare section of line in Zimbabwe.

=== Height ===
The height of the overhead line can create hazards at level crossings, where it may be struck by road vehicles. Warning signs are placed on the approaches, advising drivers of the maximum safe height.

The wiring in most countries is too low to allow double-stack container trains. Exceptions include the Channel Tunnel, which has a higher overhead line to accommodate double-height car and truck transporters, and lines in China and India with higher wiring and pantographs to allow double-stack container trains.

== History ==
The first tram with overhead lines was presented by Werner von Siemens at the 1881 International Exposition of Electricity in Paris: the installation was removed after that event. In October 1883, the first permanent tram service with overhead lines was on the Mödling and Hinterbrühl Tram in Austria. The trams had bipolar overhead lines, consisting of two U-pipes, in which the pantographs hung and ran like shuttles. From April to June 1882, Siemens had tested a similar system on his Electromote, an early precursor of the trolleybus.

Much simpler and more functional was an overhead wire in combination with a pantograph borne by the vehicle and pressed at the line from below. This system, for rail traffic with a unipolar line, was invented by Frank J. Sprague in 1888. From 1889 it was used at the Richmond Union Passenger Railway in Richmond, Virginia, pioneering electric traction.

== See also ==
- Catenary maintenance vehicle
- Electro-diesel locomotive
- Gantry
- Insulator (electricity)
- Lineworker
- List of railway electrification systems
- Railway electrification
- Traction current pylon
- Utility pole
