= Pylon Peak =

Pylon Peak may refer to:

- Pylon Peak (British Columbia), a mountain in British Columbia, Canada
- Pylon Peak (Wyoming), a mountain in the Wind River Range, Wyoming, USA
