= Overhead line pylon =

Overhead line pylon may refer to:

- Transmission tower, used to support an overhead power line
- Traction current pylon, on a railroad
