= Pilon (surname) =

Pilon is a French surname that may refer to the following notable people:

- Antoine Olivier Pilon (born 1997), Canadian actor
- Benoît Pilon (born 1962), francophone Canadian director and screenwriter
- Bernard Pilon (1918–1970), Canadian insurance broker and politician
- Daniel Pilon (1940–2018), Canadian-born actor
- Donald Pilon (disambiguation), multiple people
- Fletcher Pilon (born 2001), Australian acoustic singer and songwriter
- François Pilon (born 1958), Canadian politician
- Frederick Pilon (1750–1788), Irish actor and dramatist
- Garrett Pilon (born 1998), American-born Canadian ice hockey centre
- Germain Pilon (c.1537–1590), French Renaissance sculptor
- Hormisdas Pilon (1857–1937), Canadian politician
- Jean-Guy Pilon (1930–2021), Canadian poet
- Jeff Pilon (born 1976), Canadian gridiron football offensive tackle
- Joseph Pilon (1826–1909), Canadian farmer, merchant and political figure
- Juliana Geran Pilon, contemporary Romanian-born American political scientist and writer
- Marie-Josée Arès-Pilon (born 1982), weightlifter competing for Canada
- Mary Pilon (born 1986), American journalist
- Nathan Pilon (born 1976), Australian cricketer
- Nicolas J-L Pilon, Canadian Army officer
- Ray Pilon (born 1945), American politician
- Rich Pilon (born 1968), retired NHL ice hockey player
- Roger Pilon (born 1942), American libertarian legal theorist
- Veno Pilon (1896–1970), Slovene expressionist painter, graphic artist and photographer
- Victor Pilon (born 1958), Canadian theatre designer, visual designer and photographer
