= Warrior Peaks =

Mountain in Wyoming, United States

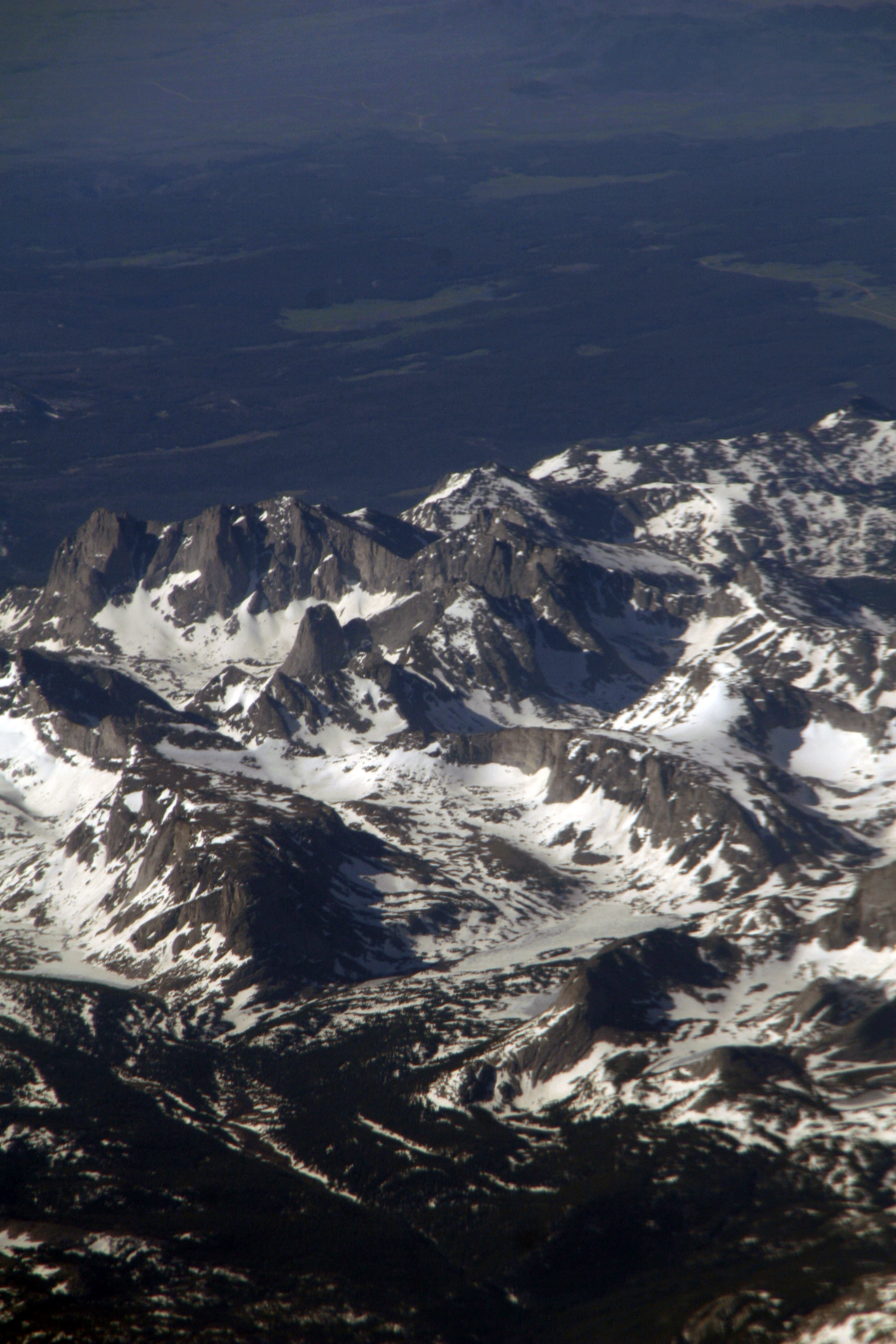

Highest point
- Elevation: 12,411 ft (3,783 m)
- Prominence: 966 ft (294 m)
- Coordinates: 42°45′45″N 109°13′22″W

Geography
- Location within Wyoming Location within the United States
- Location: Fremont and Sublette Counties, Wyoming, U.S.
- Parent range: Wind River Range
- Topo map: USGS Lizard Head Peak

Warrior Peaks (12,411 feet (3,783 m)) is located in the southern Wind River Range in the U.S. state of Wyoming. Warrior Peaks is on the southern side of the Cirque of the Towers, a popular climbing area and is just west of War Bonnet Peak. Warrior Peaks sits along the Continental Divide.

== Hazards ==
Encountering bears is a concern in the Wind River Range. There are other concerns as well, including bugs, wildfires, adverse snow conditions and nighttime cold temperatures.

Importantly, there have been notable incidents, including accidental deaths, due to falls from steep cliffs (a misstep could be fatal in this class 4/5 terrain) and due to falling rocks, over the years, including 1993, 2007 (involving an experienced NOLS leader), 2015 and 2018. Other incidents include a seriously injured backpacker being airlifted near SquareTop Mountain in 2005, and a fatal hiker incident (from an apparent accidental fall) in 2006 that involved state search and rescue. The U.S. Forest Service does not offer updated aggregated records on the official number of fatalities in the Wind River Range.

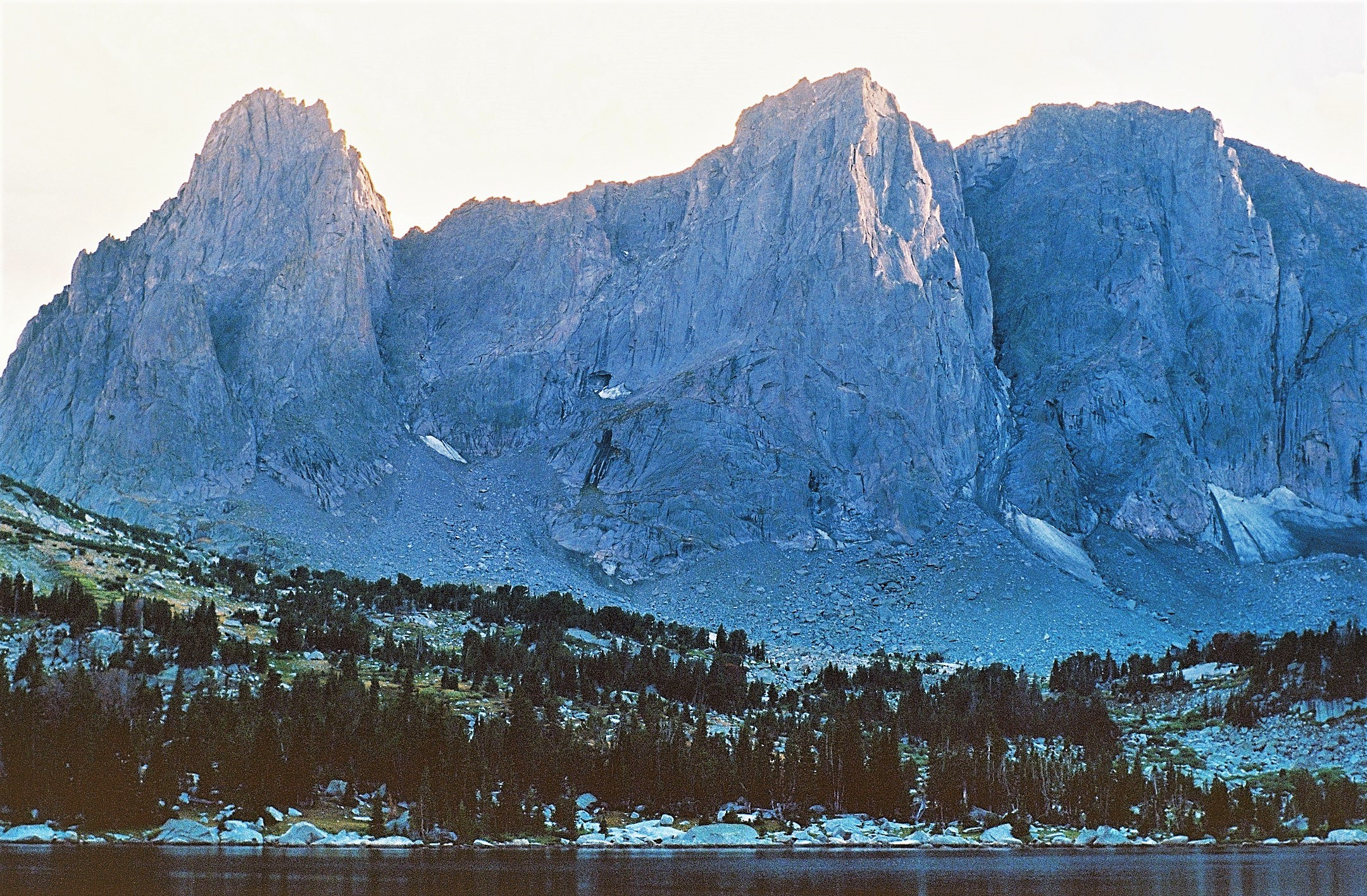
Warrior Peaks (right), north aspect from Lonesome Lake. War Bonnet Peak to left.
