= Donald Pilon =

Donald Pilon may refer to:

- Donald Pilon (actor) (born 1938), Canadian actor
- Donald Pilon (politician), American politician
