= Pylon (play) =

Scottish 2017 play

Pylon is a Scottish play, first performed at The Palace Theatre Kilmarnock in 2017.

Pylon fuses monologue, live music and archive news footage. The story focuses on links between electricity pylons and high rates of cancer diagnoses in the socioeconomically deprived Shortlees housing scheme in the south of Kilmarnock.

As of 2022, Pylon has been performed in Kilmarnock, The Mitchell Theatre in Glasgow and Theatre Royal Stratford.

Pylon was created and written by Graeme Cameron, Paul Montgomery, Stevie Smith and Paul Milligan.
