= Traction current pylon =

110 kV traction current pylon in Germany with 4 conductors.

A traction current pylon is a railroad pylon carrying at least one circuit for traction current. In Germany, traction current lines with two systems (4 conductor cables) typically have a single level arrangement of the conductor cables. For traction current lines with four systems (8 conductor cables), the two-level arrangement (4 conductor cables on each crossbar) is frequently used, except for traction current lines supplying high-speed railway lines are used. For these lines a three-level arrangement is used, in which the lowest cross bar has four conductor cables and each of the two highest cross bars have two conductor cables. The three-level arrangement is also used for traction current pylons with 6 electric circuits (12 conductor cables). For the supply of rapid-transit railways operated with alternating current, some overhead line pylons have cross bars for traction current lines above the contact wire. Other pylons carry electric circuits for traction current and also for three-phase alternating current.

== See also ==
- Gantry
- Railway traction line towers
- Utility pole
- Overhead line
