= Marble Creek Glacier =

Glacier in the state of Washington

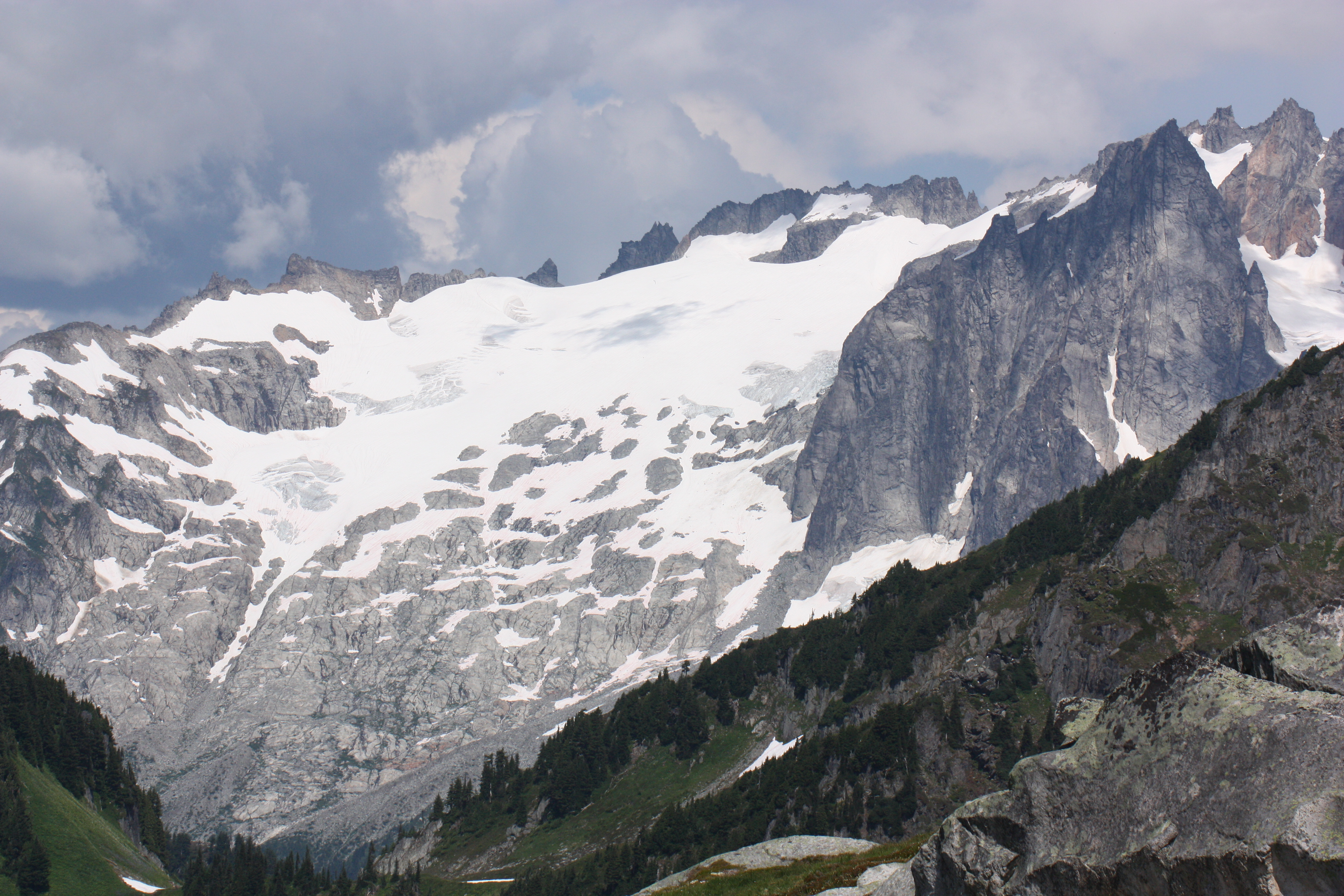
- Marble Creek Glacier (with Early Morning Spire to right

- Location within Washington (state)
- Type: Mountain glacier
- Location: Skagit County, Washington, U.S.
- Coordinates: 48°33′32″N 121°08′48″W
- Length: .55 mi (0.89 km)
- Terminus: Icefall
- Status: Retreating

Marble Creek Glacier is in North Cascades National Park in the U.S. state of Washington. Marble Creek Glacier is at the headwaters of Marble Creek, a major tributary of the Cascade River. The glacier lies to the NNW of Dorado Needle and is also 1.20 mi (1.93 km) NNW of Eldorado Peak. To the east of Marble Creek Glacier lie the much larger Inspiration and McAllister Glaciers. Marble Creek Glacier descends from 8,000 to 7,000 ft (2,400 to 2,100 m).

== See also ==
- List of glaciers in the United States
