= Early Morning Spire =

Mountain in Washington (state), United States

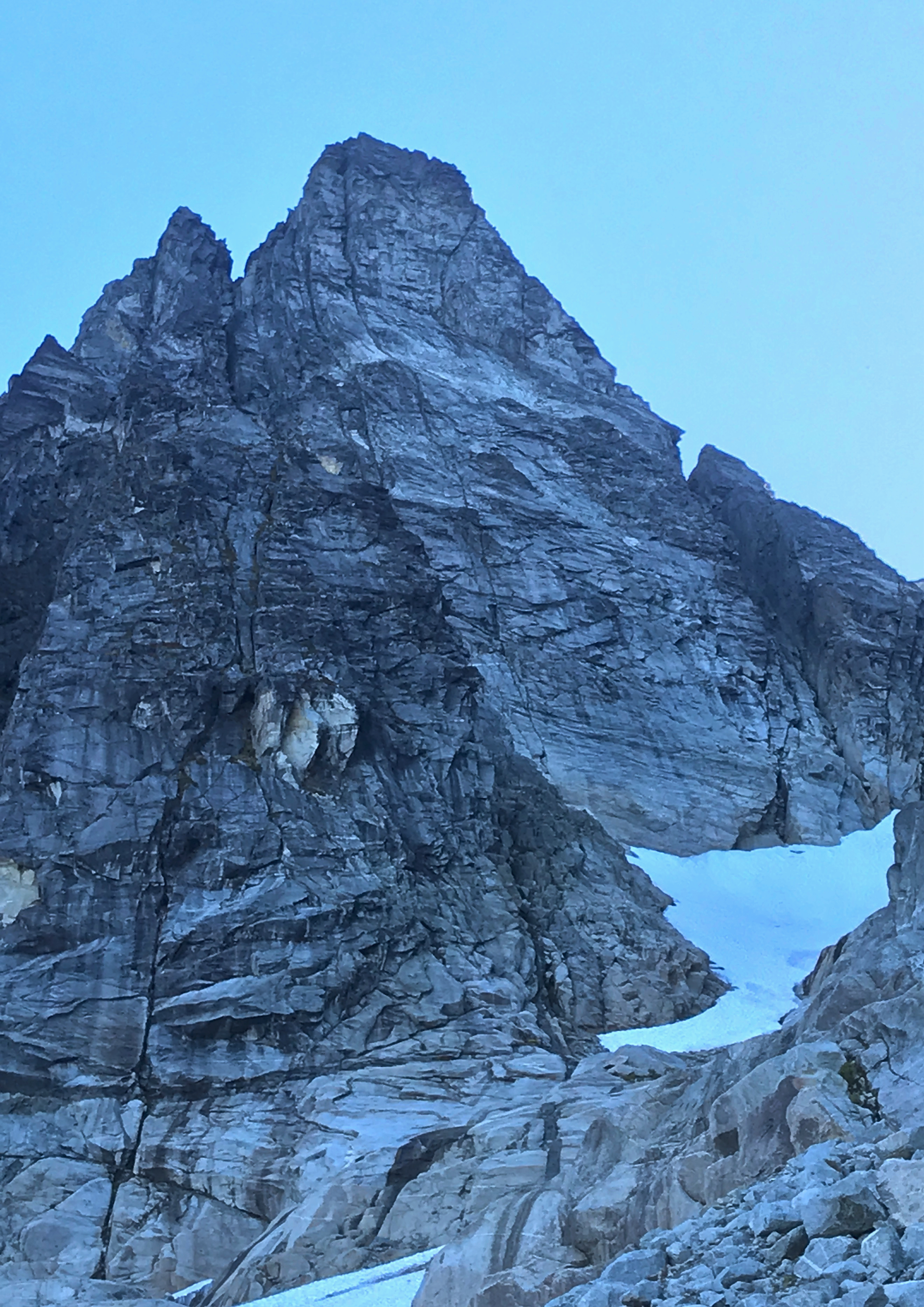
- Early Morning Spire

Highest point
- Elevation: 8,200 ft (2,499 m)
- Prominence: 240 ft (73 m)
- Parent peak: Dorado Needle 8,440 ft
- Coordinates: 48°33′04″N 121°08′41″W

Geography
- Location within Washington (state) Location within the United States
- Interactive map of Early Morning Spire
- Country: United States
- State: Washington
- County: Skagit
- Protected area: North Cascades National Park
- Parent range: North Cascades; Cascade Range
- Topo map: USGS Eldorado Peak

Geology
- Rock age: Cretaceous
- Rock type: Orthogneiss

Climbing
- First ascent: 1971 by Richard Emerson and Tom Hornbein
- Easiest route: Climbing class 4

Early Morning Spire is an 8,200-foot (2,499-metre) mountain summit located in North Cascades National Park, in Skagit County of Washington state. The peak lies 0.29 mi (0.47 km) west-northwest of Dorado Needle, 1.05 mi (1.69 km) north-northwest of Eldorado Peak and 1.08 mi (1.74 km) southeast of Perdition Peak. It can be seen from the North Cascades Highway, west of Marblemount at a road pullout alongside the Skagit River. The first ascent of the peak was made in 1971 by Richard Emerson and Tom Hornbein via the Southwest Face. They made a chilly bivouac near the summit, which is how the peak's name came to be. Precipitation runoff from the mountain drains into Marble Creek, a tributary of the Cascade River.

== Climate ==
Early Morning Spire is located in the marine west coast climate zone of western North America. Weather fronts coming off the Pacific Ocean travel northeast toward the Cascade Mountains. As fronts approach the North Cascades, they are forced upward by the peaks of the Cascade Range (orographic lift), causing them to drop their moisture in the form of rain or snowfall onto the Cascades. As a result, the west side of the North Cascades experiences high precipitation, especially during the winter months in the form of snowfall. During winter months, weather is usually cloudy, but, due to high pressure systems over the Pacific Ocean that intensify during summer months, there is often little or no cloud cover during the summer.

== Geology ==
The North Cascades features some of the most rugged topography in the Cascade Range with craggy peaks, spires, ridges, and deep glacial valleys. Geological events occurring many years ago created the diverse topography and drastic elevation changes over the Cascade Range leading to the various climate differences.

The history of the formation of the Cascade Mountains dates back millions of years ago to the late Eocene Epoch. With the North American Plate overriding the Pacific Plate, episodes of volcanic igneous activity persisted. In addition, small fragments of the oceanic and continental lithosphere called terranes created the North Cascades about 50 million years ago.

During the Pleistocene period dating back over two million years ago, glaciation advancing and retreating repeatedly scoured and shaped the landscape. A small unnamed glacial remnant lies on the southeast aspect of Early Morning Spire, and the Marble Creek Glacier lies to the north. The U-shaped cross section of the river valleys is a result of recent glaciation. Uplift and faulting in combination with glaciation have been the dominant processes which have created the tall peaks and deep valleys of the North Cascades area.

== Climbing Routes ==
Climbing Routes on Early Morning Spire

- Southwest Face - class 5.8
- Southeast Face - class 5.7
- North Route - class 4

== Gallery ==
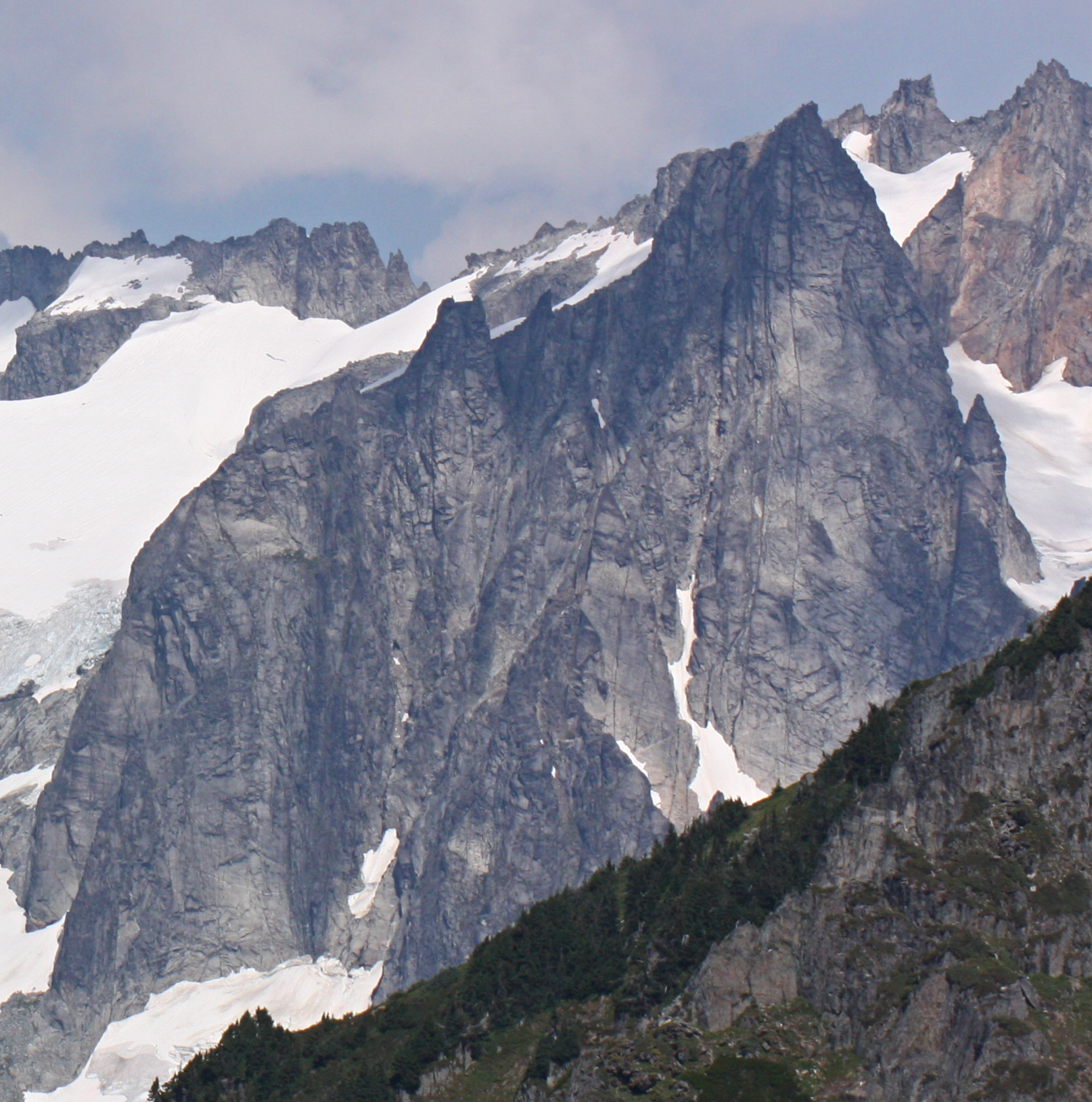
Early Morning Spire from Hidden Lake Peaks
