= Tricouni Peak (Washington) =

Mountain in Washington (state), United States

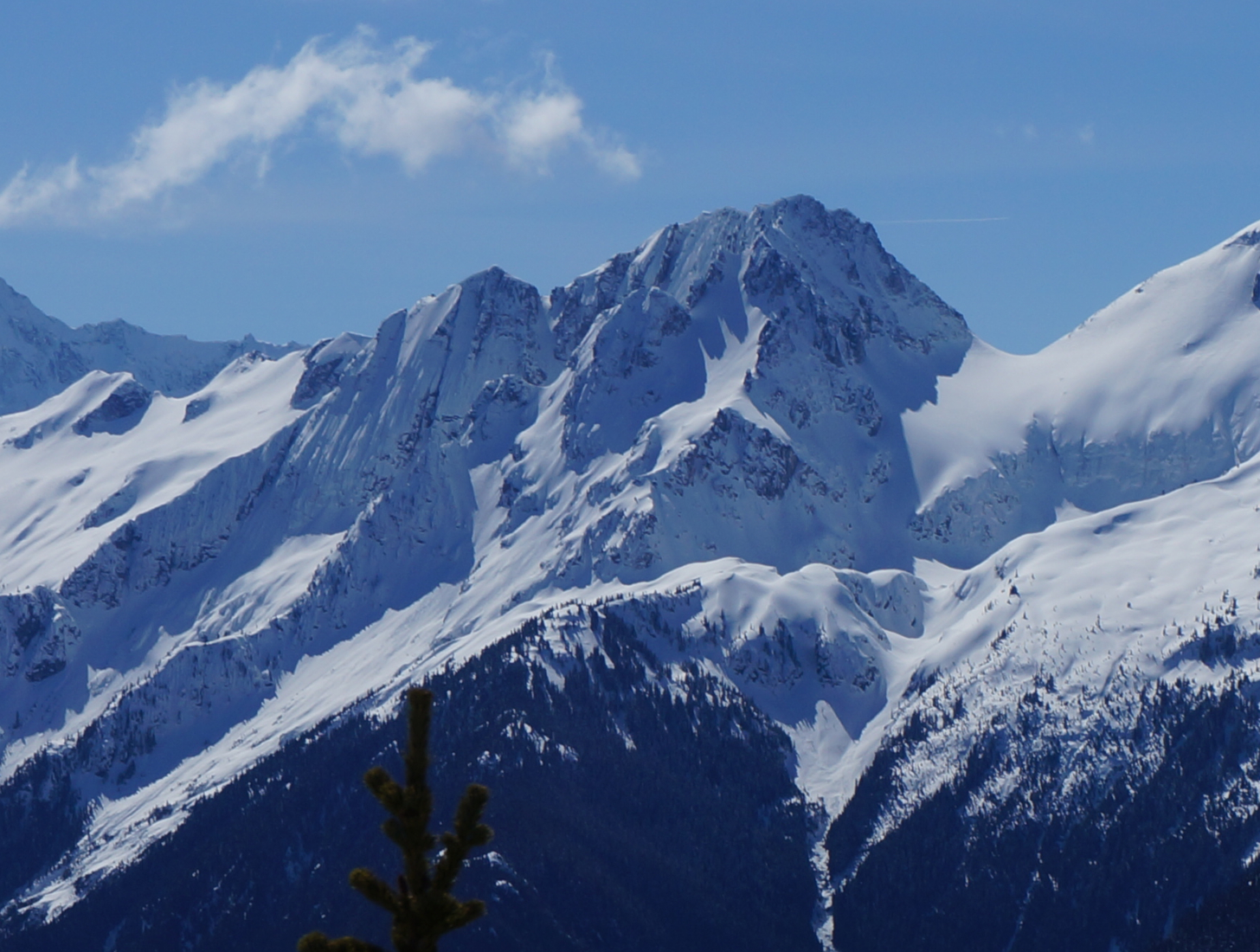
- Tricouni Peak seen from Ruby Mountain

Highest point
- Elevation: 8,102 ft (2,469 m)
- Prominence: 862 ft (263 m)
- Parent peak: Primus Peak
- Isolation: 0.62 mi (1.00 km)
- Coordinates: 48°34′56″N 121°04′42″W

Naming
- Etymology: Tricouni

Geography
- Location within Washington (state) Location within the United States
- Interactive map of Tricouni Peak
- Country: United States
- State: Washington
- County: Skagit
- Protected area: North Cascades National Park
- Parent range: North Cascades; Cascade Range
- Topo map: USGS Forbidden Peak

Geology
- Rock type: Eldorado Orthogneiss

Climbing
- First ascent: 1951 Les Carlson, Elwyn Elerding, Jeanne Elerding
- Easiest route: Glacier travel, rock scrambling

Tricouni Peak is an 8,102-foot (2,469-metre) mountain summit located in Skagit County of Washington state. It is situated in North Cascades National Park, north of the North Klawatti Glacier and southeast of the Borealis Glacier. The nearest higher peak is Primus Peak, 0.54 mi (0.87 km) to the west. Precipitation runoff from Tricouni drains into Thunder Creek. The peak is named for the tricouni which was used for traction on ice, and the approach to the peak involves traversing a glacier.

== Climate ==
Tricouni Peak is located in the marine west coast climate zone of western North America. Most weather fronts coming off the Pacific Ocean travel northeast toward the Cascade Mountains. As fronts approach the North Cascades, they are forced upward by the peaks of the Cascade Range (orographic lift), causing them to drop their moisture in the form of rain or snow onto the Cascades. As a result, the west side of the North Cascades experiences high precipitation, especially during the winter months in the form of snowfall. Because of maritime influence, snow tends to be wet and heavy, resulting in high avalanche danger. During winter months, weather is usually cloudy, but due to high pressure systems over the Pacific Ocean that intensify during summer months, there is often little or no cloud cover during the summer.

== Geology ==
The North Cascades features some of the most rugged topography in the Cascade Range with craggy peaks, spires, ridges, and deep glacial valleys. Geological events occurring many years ago created the diverse topography and drastic elevation changes over the Cascade Range leading to the various climate differences.

The history of the formation of the Cascade Mountains dates back millions of years ago to the late Eocene Epoch. With the North American Plate overriding the Pacific Plate, episodes of volcanic igneous activity persisted. In addition, small fragments of the oceanic and continental lithosphere called terranes created the North Cascades about 50 million years ago.

During the Pleistocene period dating back over two million years ago, glaciation advancing and retreating repeatedly scoured the landscape leaving deposits of rock debris. The U-shaped cross section of the river valleys is a result of recent glaciation. Uplift and faulting in combination with glaciation have been the dominant processes which have created the tall peaks and deep valleys of the North Cascades area.

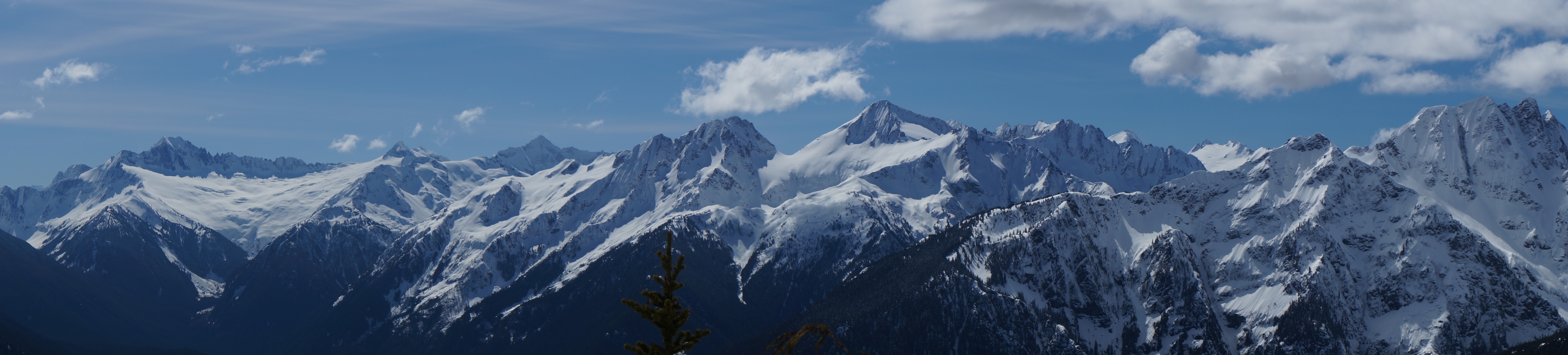
Panorama from Ruby Mountain with treetop pointing to Tricouni Peak. Primus Peak to immediate right of Tricouni
