= Klawatti Lake =

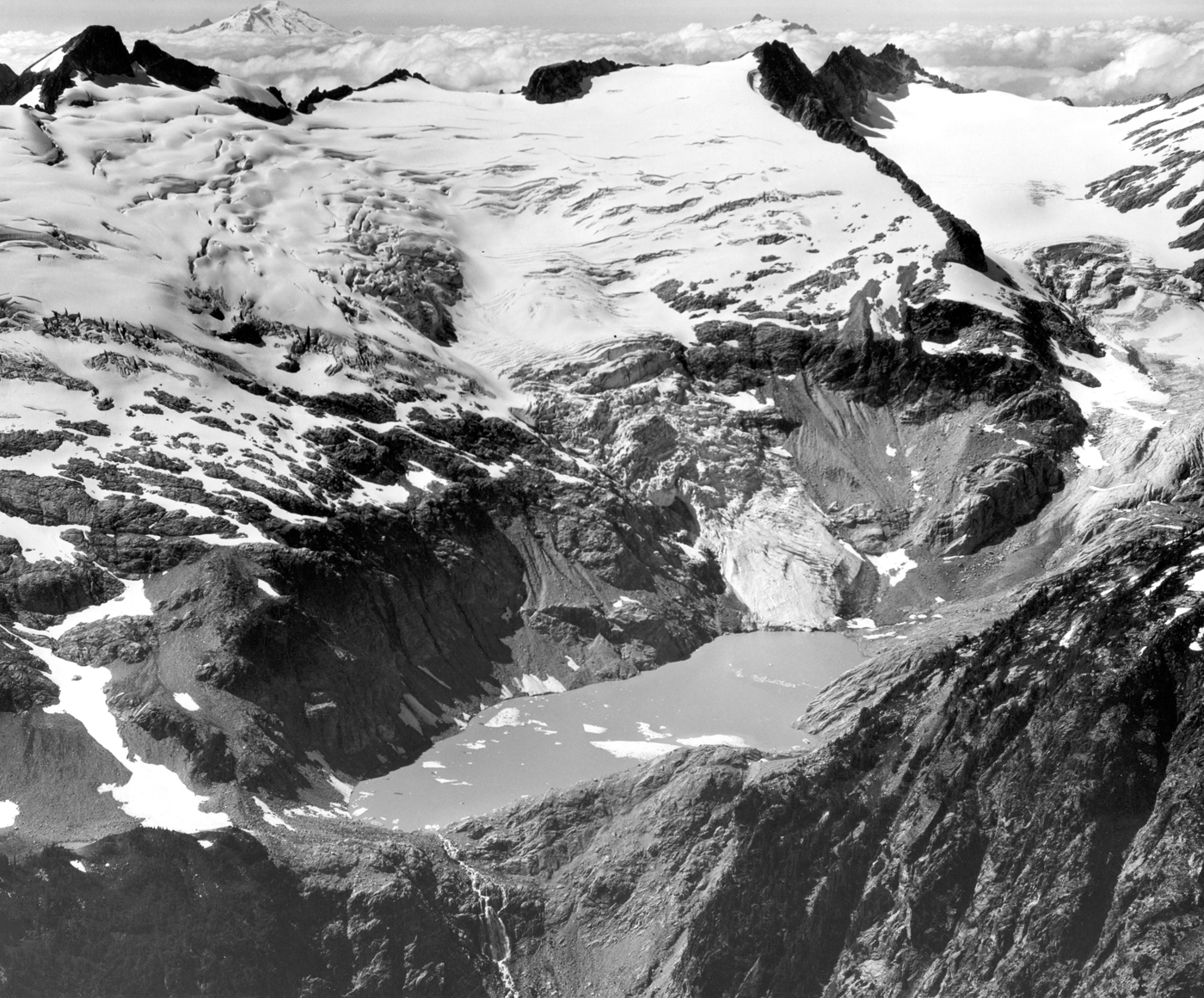
- Klawatti Lake in 1969, when Klawatti Glacier still terminated in the lake

- Location within Washington (state) Location within the United States
- Location: North Cascades National Park, Skagit County, Washington, United States
- Coordinates: 48°33′20″N 121°04′47″W
- Lake type: Alpine lake
- Primary outflows: Klawatti Creek
- Basin countries: United States
- Max. length: .60 mi (0.97 km)
- Max. width: .25 mi (0.40 km)
- Surface elevation: 5,367 ft (1,636 m)

Klawatti Lake is located in North Cascades National Park, in the U. S. state of Washington. Klawatti Lake is in a remote section of the park and well off any designated trails. Klawatti Lake was formed by the retreat of Klawatti Glacier and North Klawatti Glacier in the mid-1900s. During warmer months, melt from both the North Klawatti Glacier and Klawatti Glacier flows into Klawatti Lake. Klawatti Peak is 1 mi (1.6 km) west of the lake.
