= Perdition Peak =

Mountain in Washington (state), United States

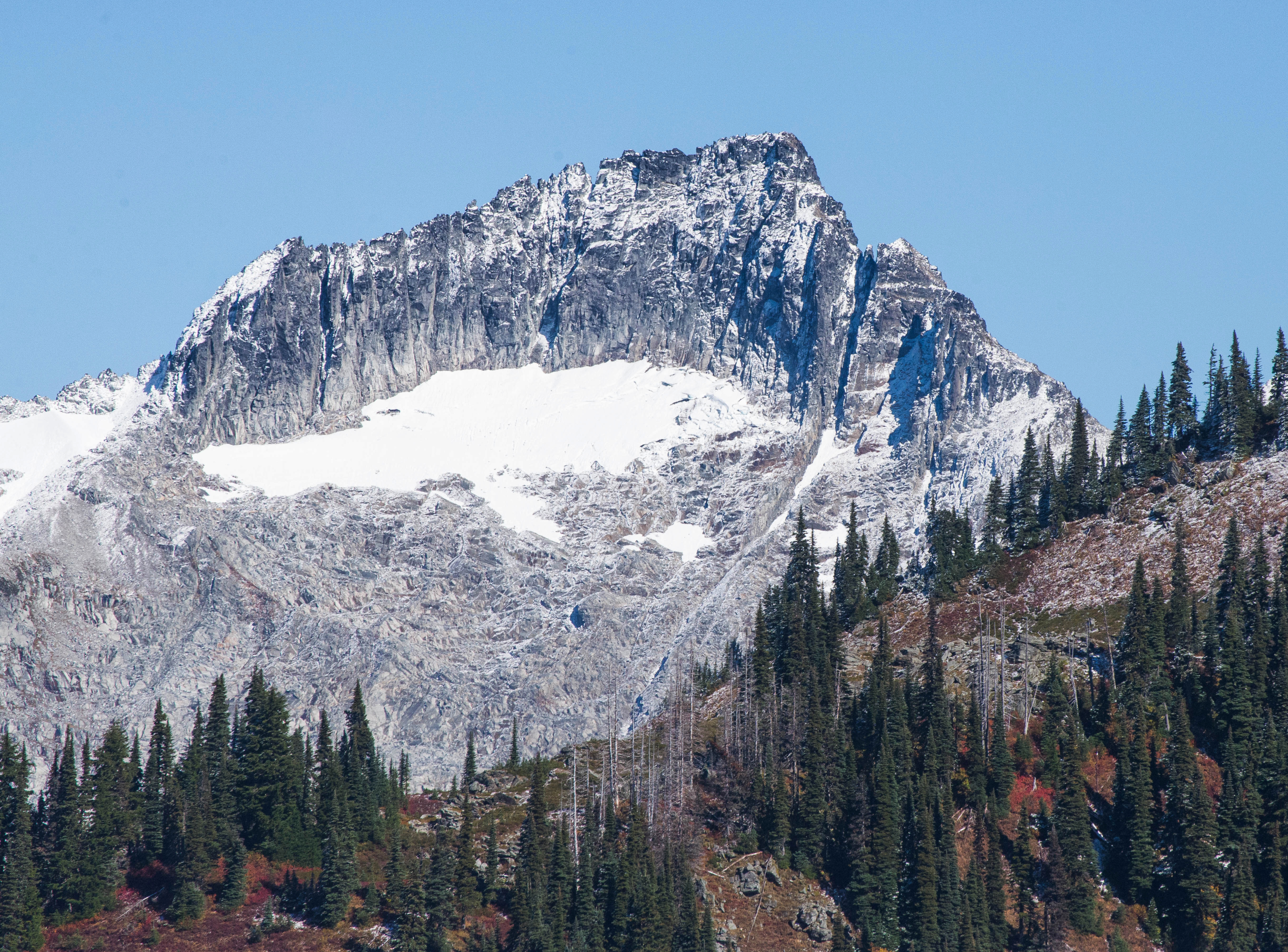
- Perdition Peak, south aspect

Highest point
- Elevation: 7,675 ft (2,339 m)
- Prominence: 595 ft (181 m)
- Parent peak: Dorado Needle (8,460 ft)
- Isolation: 1.32 mi (2.12 km)
- Coordinates: 48°33′50″N 121°09′30″W

Geography
- Location within Washington (state) Location within the United States
- Interactive map of Perdition Peak
- Location: North Cascades National Park; Skagit County, Washington
- Parent range: North Cascades; Cascade Range
- Topo map: USGS Eldorado Peak

Geology
- Rock age: Cretaceous
- Rock type: Orthogneiss

Climbing
- First ascent: 1967 by John Roper
- Easiest route: Climbing YDS 4

Perdition Peak is a 7,675-foot (2,339-metre) mountain summit located in North Cascades National Park in Skagit County of Washington state. The peak lies 1.33 mi (2.14 km) northwest of Dorado Needle and 2.12 mi (3.41 km) northwest of Eldorado Peak. It can be seen from the North Cascades Highway west of Marblemount at a road pullout alongside the Skagit River. Perdition Peak is the highest peak of Backbone Ridge, and other peaks on this ridge include In Spirit Point, Cervical Point, Thoracic Point, Lumbar Point, The Sacrum, and The Coccyx. The first ascent of the peak was made on August 27, 1967, by John Roper via the serrated west ridge. Being a doctor, Roper named some of his many first ascents for anatomical parts of the body. Precipitation runoff and glacier meltwater from the mountain drains into tributaries of the Skagit River.

== Climate ==
Perdition Peak is located in the marine west coast climate zone of western North America. Most weather fronts coming off the Pacific Ocean travel northeast toward the Cascade Mountains. As fronts approach the North Cascades, they are forced upward by the peaks of the Cascade Range (orographic lift), causing them to drop their moisture in the form of rain or snowfall onto the Cascades. As a result, the west side of the North Cascades experiences high precipitation, especially during the winter months in the form of snowfall. Because of maritime influence, snow tends to be wet and heavy, resulting in high avalanche danger. During winter months, weather is usually cloudy, but, due to high pressure systems over the Pacific Ocean that intensify during summer months, there is often little or no cloud cover during the summer.

== Geology ==
The North Cascades features some of the most rugged topography in the Cascade Range with craggy peaks, spires, ridges, and deep glacial valleys. Geological events occurring many years ago created the diverse topography and drastic elevation changes over the Cascade Range leading to the various climate differences.

The history of the formation of the Cascade Mountains dates back millions of years ago to the late Eocene Epoch. With the North American Plate overriding the Pacific Plate, episodes of volcanic igneous activity persisted. In addition, small fragments of the oceanic and continental lithosphere called terranes created the North Cascades about 50 million years ago.

During the Pleistocene period dating back over two million years ago, glaciation advancing and retreating repeatedly scoured and shaped the landscape. A small glacial remnant lies on the south slope of Perdition Peak, whereas the northern slope maintains the more extensive Perdition and Backbone Glaciers. The U-shaped cross section of the river valleys is a result of recent glaciation. Uplift and faulting in combination with glaciation have been the dominant processes which have created the tall peaks and deep valleys of the North Cascades area.

== Gallery ==
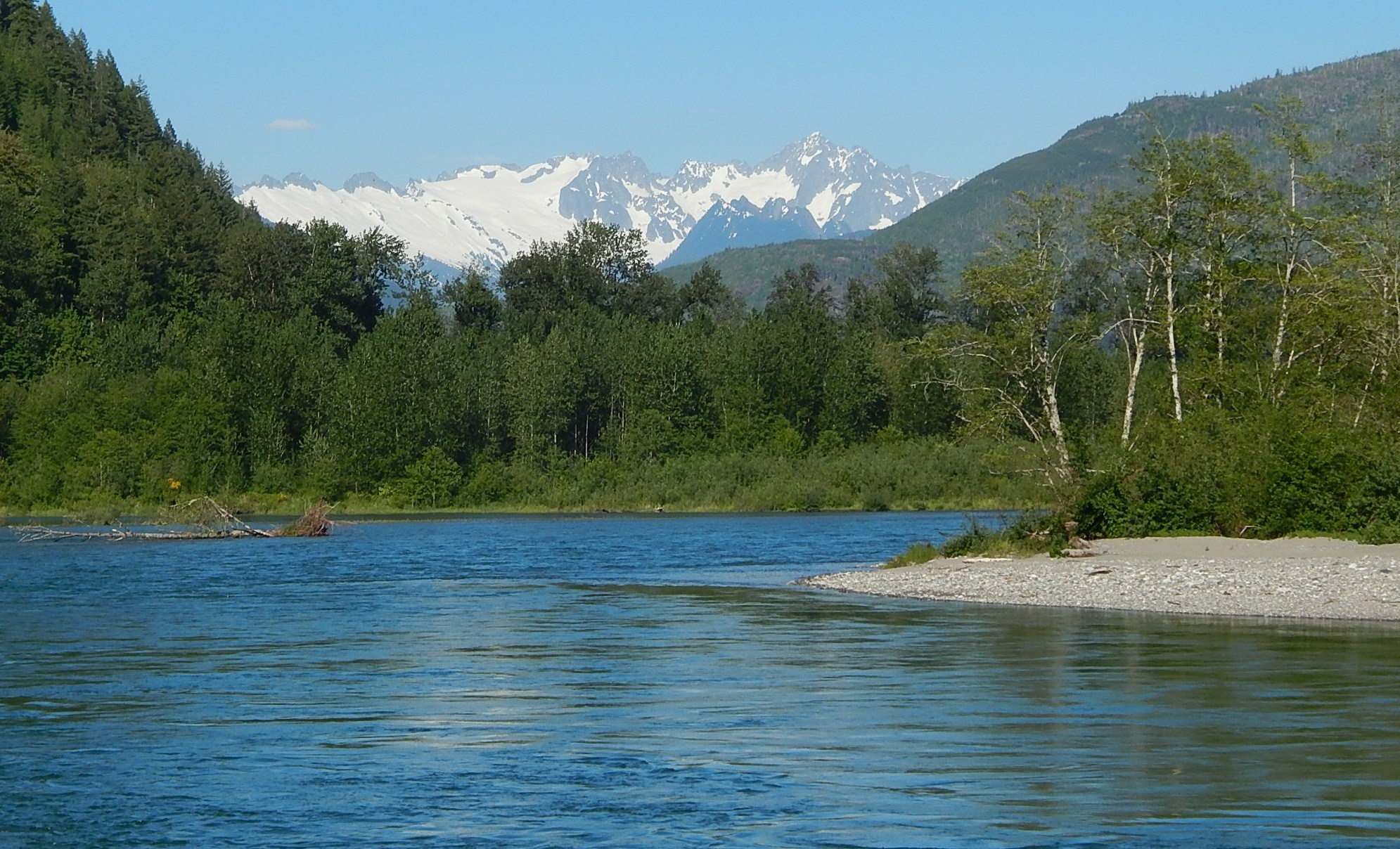
Perdition Peak (left) and Eldorado Peak seen from North Cascades Highway near Rockport.

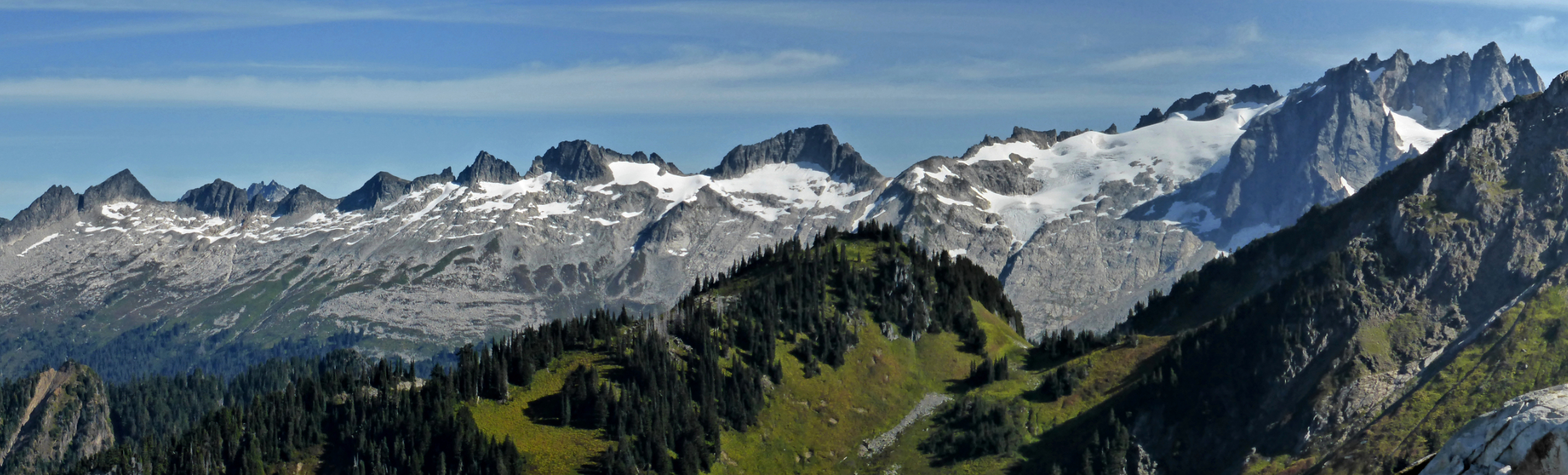
Perdition Peak centered with Backbone Ridge to left and Dorado Needle in upper right.
This view looking north from Hidden Lake Peaks.
