= Klawatti Glacier =

Glacier in the state of Washington

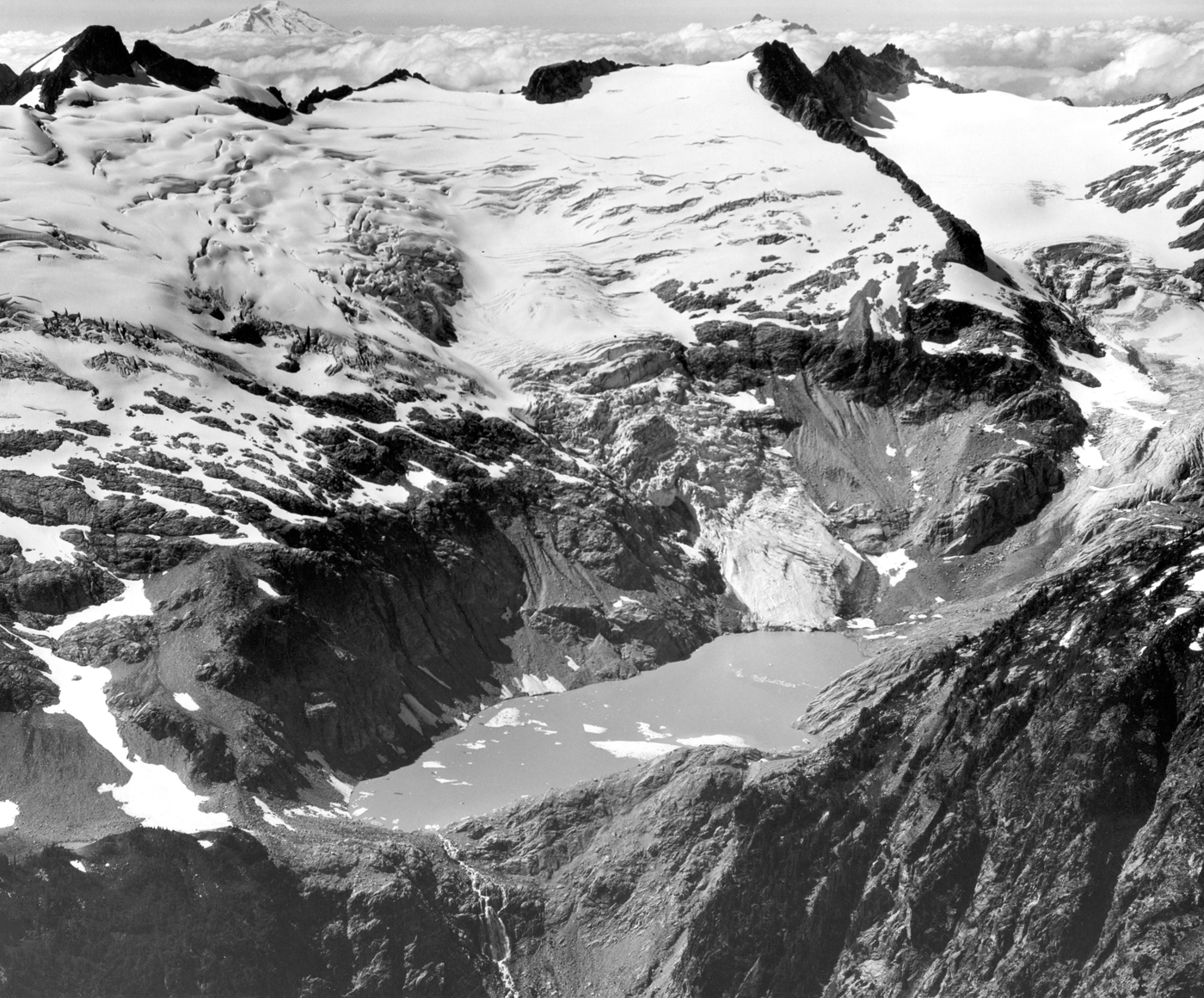
- Klawatti Glacier in 1969. At upper left is Klawatti Peak, while the North Klawatti Glacier is at far right.

- Location within Washington (state)
- Type: Mountain glacier
- Location: North Cascades National Park, Skagit County, Washington, U.S.
- Coordinates: 48°33′39″N 121°05′04″W
- Length: .85 mi (1.37 km)
- Terminus: Icefall
- Status: Retreating

Klawatti Glacier is located on the east slopes of Klawatti Peak, North Cascades National Park, in the U.S. state of Washington. The glacier is approximately .85 mi (1.37 km) in length, 1.2 mi (1.9 km) in width at its terminus and descends from 8,000 to 6,600 ft (2,400 to 2,000 m), where it terminates above Klawatti Lake. Arêtes separate Klawatti Glacier from Inspiration Glacier to the southwest, McAllister Glacier to the northwest and North Klawatti Glacier to the north.

== See also ==
- List of glaciers in the United States
