= Dorado Needle =

Mountain in Washington (state), United States

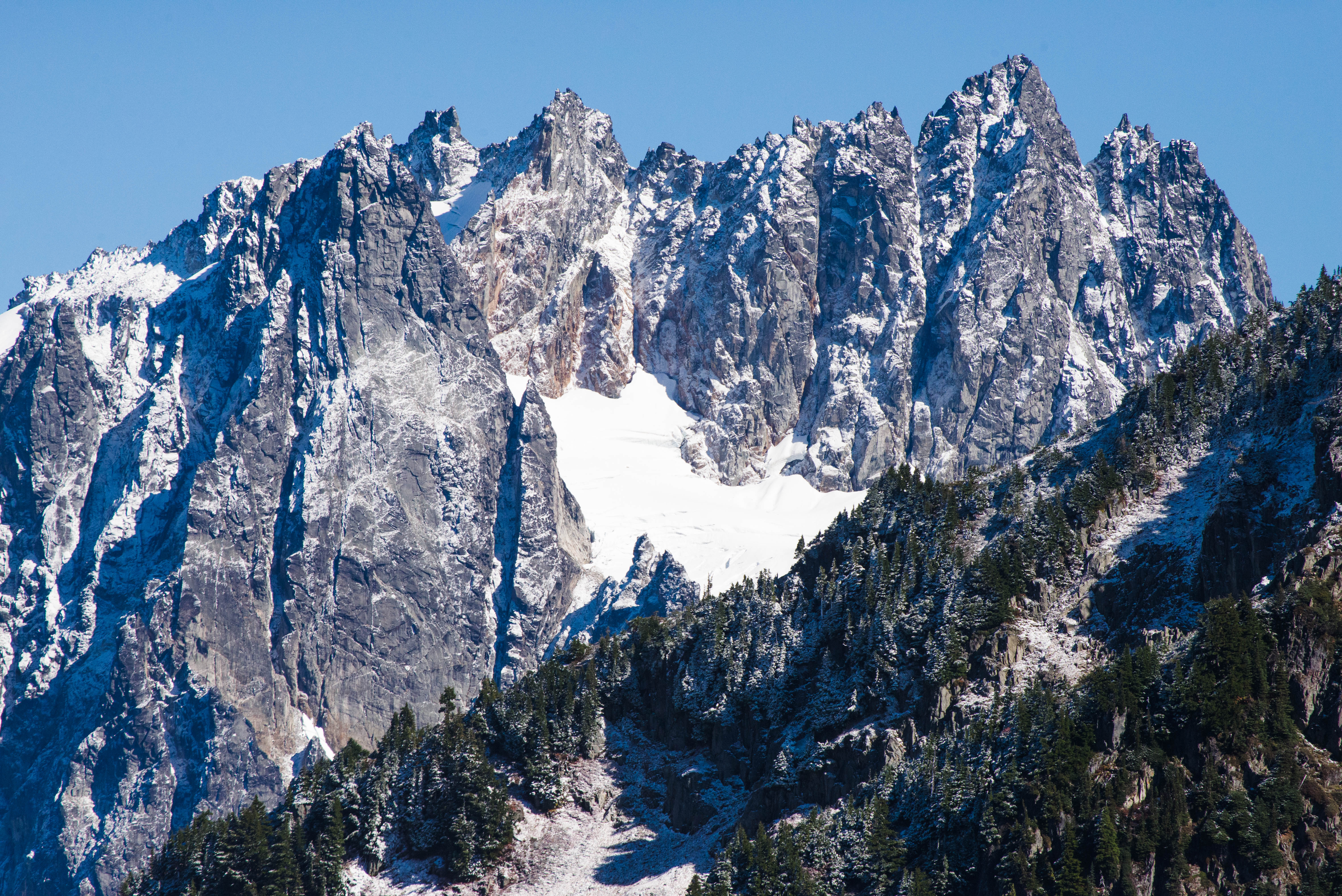
- Dorado Needle (right) from Hidden Lake Peaks (Early Morning Spire and Marble Needle to left)

Highest point
- Elevation: 8,440+ ft (2,570+ m)
- Prominence: 800 ft (240 m)
- Parent peak: Eldorado Peak 8,868 ft (2703 m)
- Coordinates: 48°32′59″N 121°08′19″W

Geography
- Location within Washington (state) Location within the United States
- Interactive map of Dorado Needle
- Country: United States
- State: Washington
- County: Skagit
- Protected area: North Cascades National Park
- Parent range: North Cascades; Cascade Range
- Topo map: USGS Eldorado Peak

Geology
- Rock age: Eocene to Late Cretaceous
- Rock type: Granodioritic Orthogneiss

Climbing
- First ascent: July 1940 by Lloyd Anderson, Karl Boyer, Tom Gorton,
- Easiest route: Climbing YDS 5.5

Dorado Needle is an 8,440+ ft (2,570+ m) mountain summit located in North Cascades National Park in Skagit County of Washington state. The peak lies 0.73 miles north of Eldorado Peak and 1.33 mi (2.14 km) southeast of Perdition Peak. It can be seen from the North Cascades Highway west of Marblemount at a road pullout along the Skagit River. The first ascent of the peak was made in July 1940 by Lloyd Anderson, Karl Boyer, and Tom Gorton via the Northwest Ridge. Precipitation runoff and glacier meltwater from the mountain drains into tributaries of the Skagit River.

== Climate ==
Dorado Needle is located in the marine west coast climate zone of western North America. Weather fronts originating in the Pacific Ocean travel northeast toward the Cascade Mountains. As fronts approach the North Cascades, they are forced upward by the peaks of the Cascade Range (orographic lift), causing them to drop their moisture in the form of rain or snowfall onto the Cascades. As a result, the west side of the North Cascades experiences high precipitation, especially during the winter months in the form of snowfall. Because of maritime influence, snow tends to be wet and heavy, resulting in high avalanche danger. During winter months, weather is usually cloudy, but, due to high pressure systems over the Pacific Ocean that intensify during summer months, there is often little or no cloud cover during the summer.

== Geology ==
The North Cascades features some of the most rugged topography in the Cascade Range with craggy peaks, spires, ridges, and deep glacial valleys. Geological events occurring many years ago created the diverse topography and drastic elevation changes over the Cascade Range leading to the various climate differences.

The history of the formation of the Cascade Mountains dates back millions of years ago to the late Eocene Epoch. With the North American Plate overriding the Pacific Plate, episodes of volcanic igneous activity persisted. In addition, small fragments of the oceanic and continental lithosphere called terranes created the North Cascades about 50 million years ago.

During the Pleistocene period dating back over two million years ago, glaciation advancing and retreating repeatedly scoured and shaped the landscape. A small glacial remnant lies on the south slope of Dorado Needle, whereas the northern slope maintains the extensive McAllister Glacier. The U-shaped cross section of the river valleys is a result of recent glaciation. Uplift and faulting in combination with glaciation have been the dominant processes which have created the tall peaks and deep valleys of the North Cascades area.

== Climbing Routes ==
Climbing Routes on Dorado Needle

- Dorado Needle SW Buttress - class 5.8 9 pitches
- Dorado Needle East Ridge - class 5.7
- Dorado Needle NW Ridge - class 5.4 3 pitches

== Gallery ==
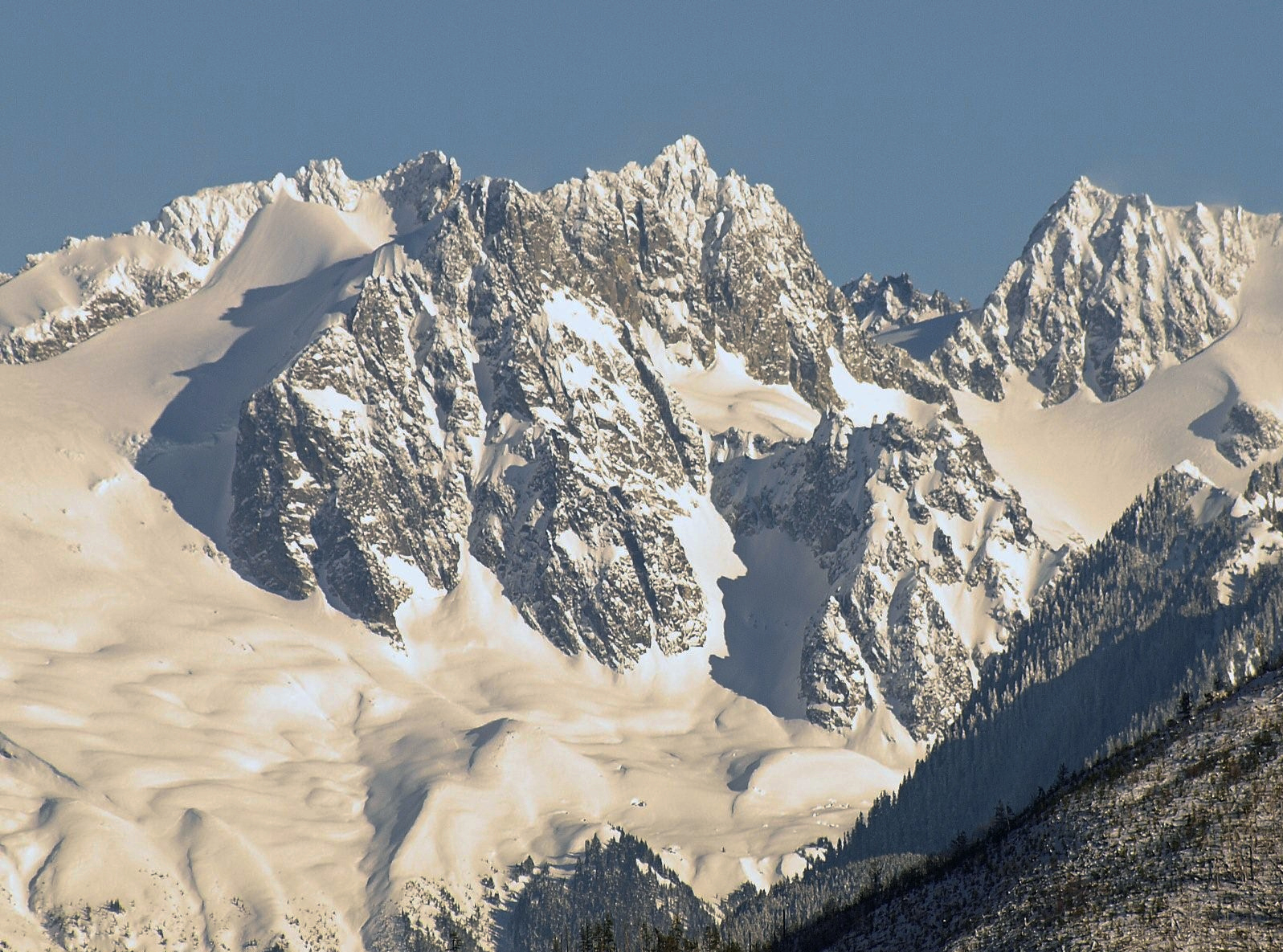
Dorado Needle in winter

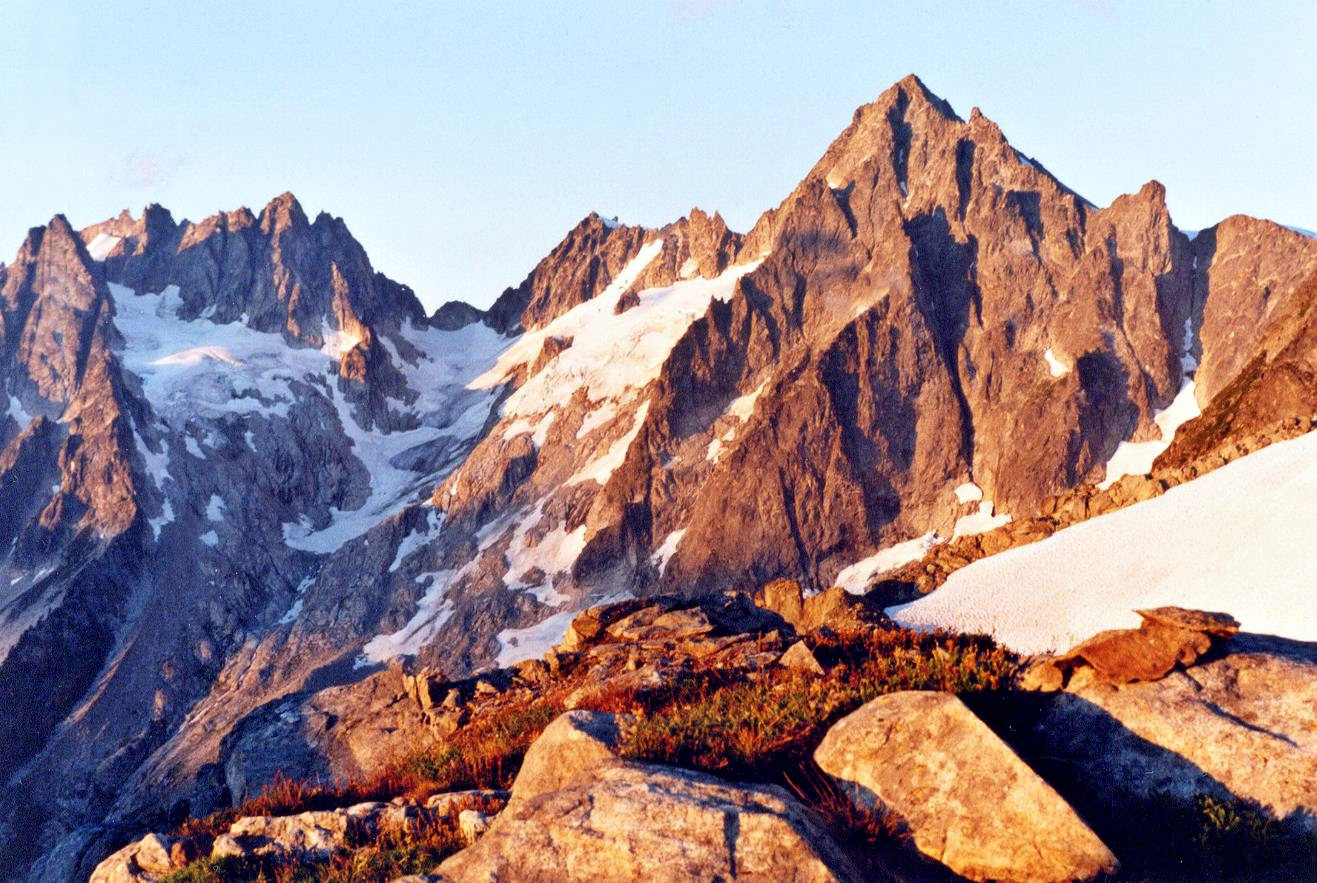
Dorado Needle (left) and Eldorado Peak seen from near The Triad

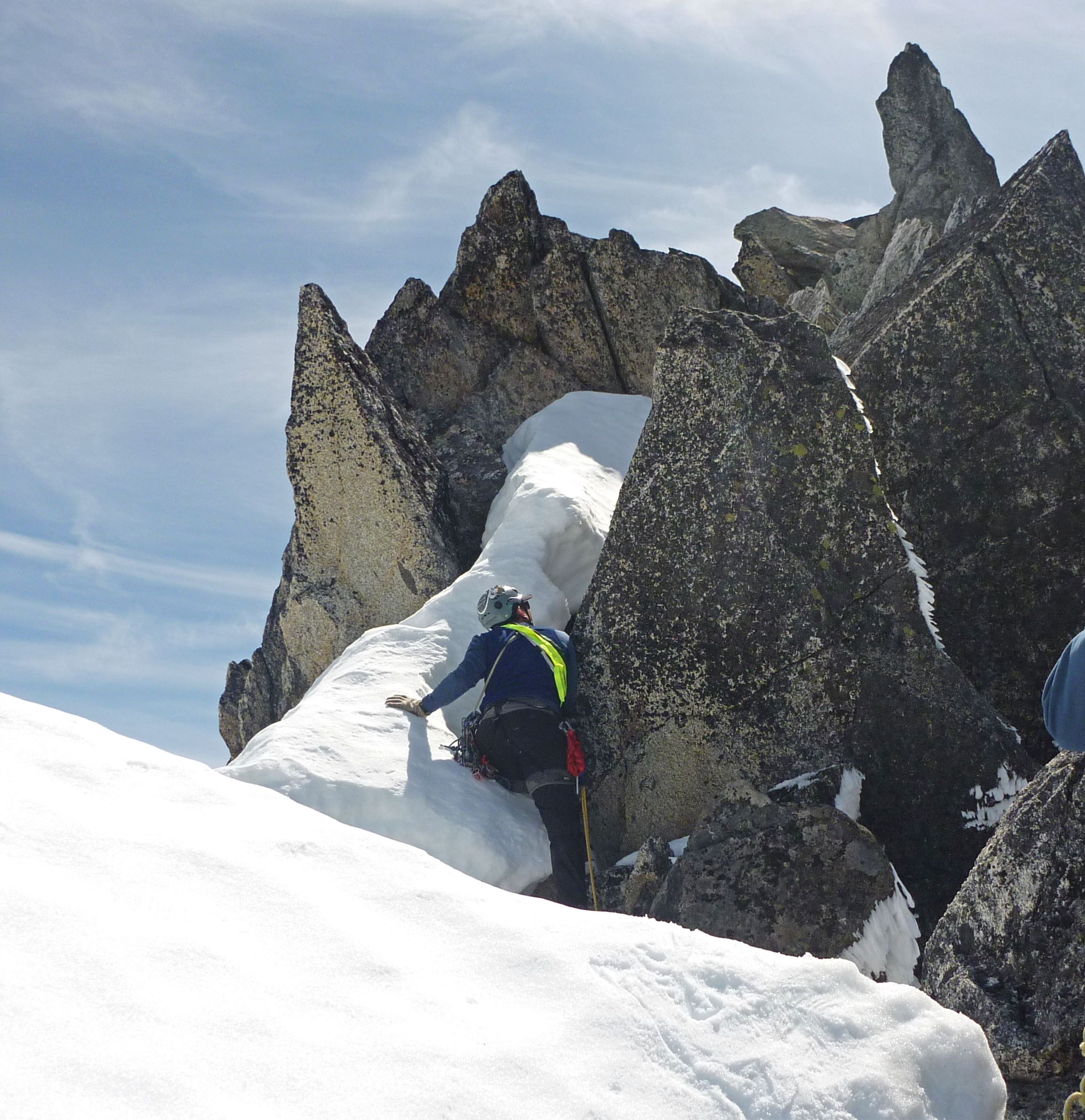
The summit of Dorado Needle

== See also ==
- Geography of the North Cascades
- Geology of the Pacific Northwest
