= Primus Peak =

Mountain in Washington (state), United States

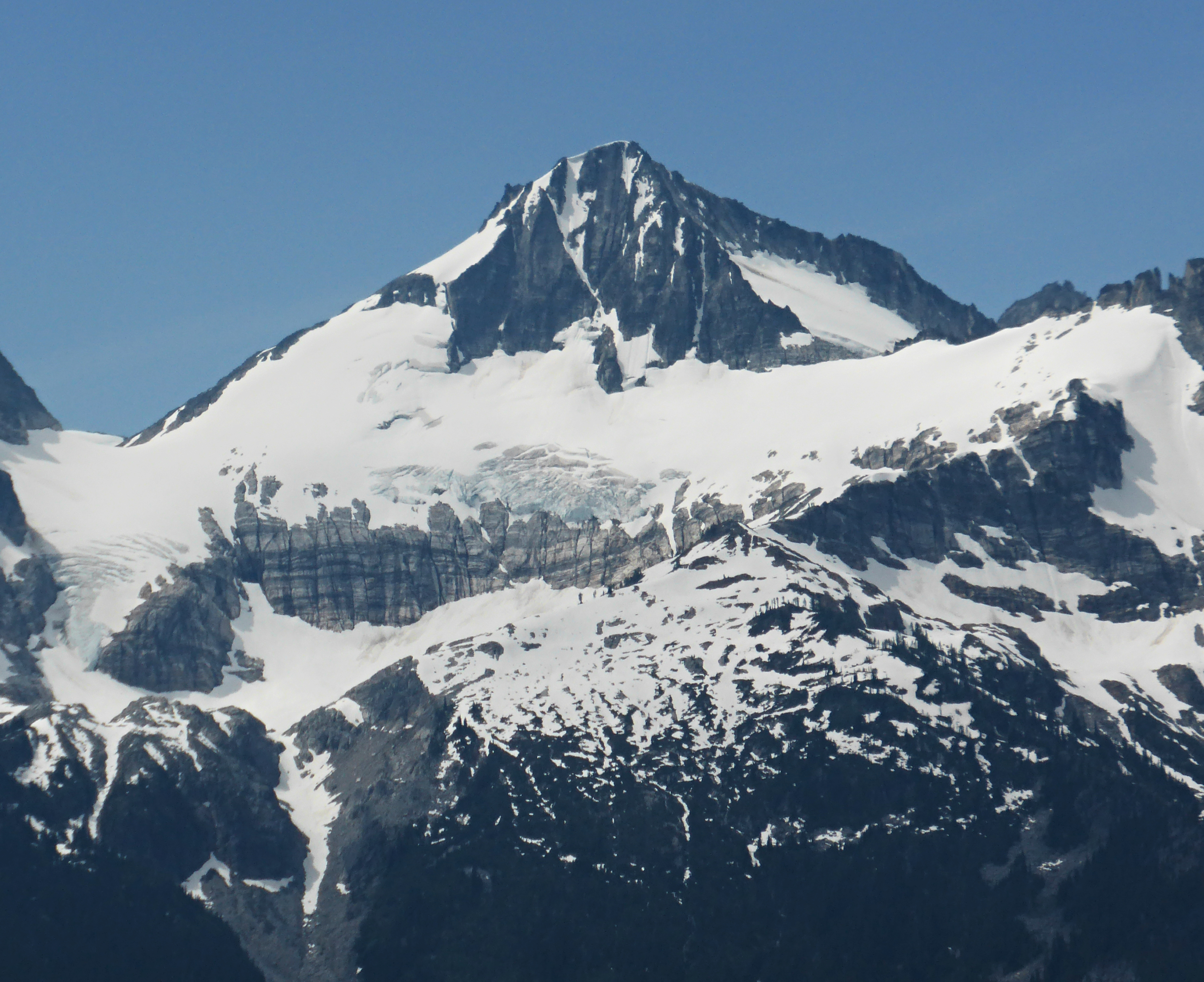
- Primus Peak seen from Ruby Mountain

Highest point
- Elevation: 8,508 ft (2,593 m)
- Prominence: 828 ft (252 m)
- Coordinates: 48°34′55″N 120°05′28″W

Geography
- Location within Washington (state) Location within the United States
- Location: North Cascades National Park, Washington, U.S.
- Parent range: Cascade Range
- Topo map: USGS Forbidden Peak

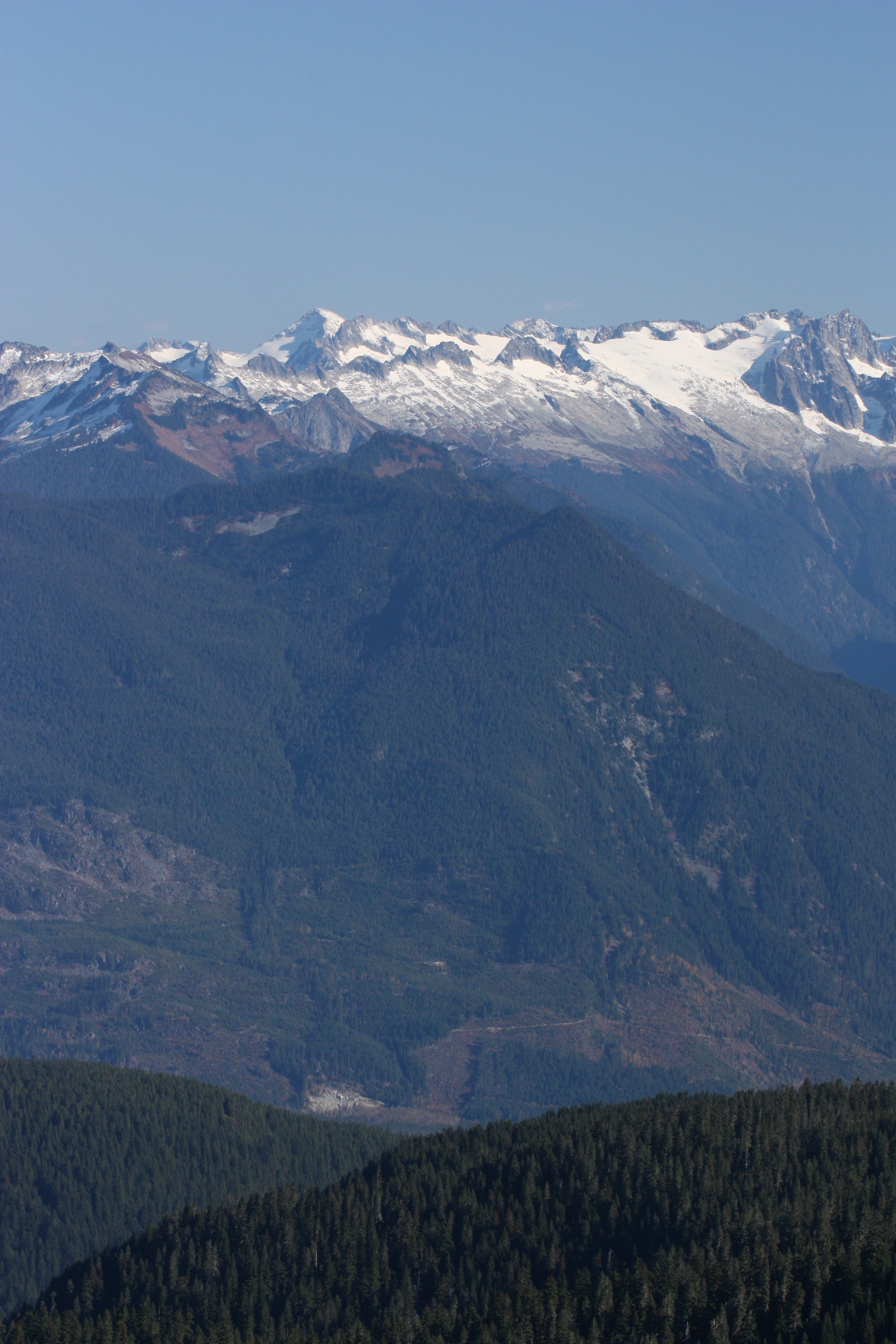
Primus Peak (left skyline with large shadowed northwest face); Austera Peak (indistinct ridge on skyline); Klawatti Peak (center skyline); Dorado Needle (far right skyline); Little Devil Peak (left middle distance)

Primus Peak (8,508 feet (2,593 m)) is located in North Cascades National Park in the U.S. state of Washington. Primus Peak is flanked by North Klawatti Glacier to the south and Borealis Glacier to the northeast. Tricouni Peak is situated immediately east of Primus Peak.

== Climate ==
Primus Peak is located in the marine west coast climate zone of western North America. Most weather fronts originate in the Pacific Ocean, and travel northeast toward the Cascade Mountains. As fronts approach the North Cascades, they are forced upward by the peaks of the Cascade Range, causing them to drop their moisture in the form of rain or snowfall onto the Cascades (Orographic lift). As a result, the west side of the North Cascades experiences high precipitation, especially during the winter months in the form of snowfall. During winter months, weather is usually cloudy, but, due to high pressure systems over the Pacific Ocean that intensify during summer months, there is often little or no cloud cover during the summer. Because of maritime influence, snow tends to be wet and heavy, resulting in high avalanche danger.

== Geology ==
The North Cascades features some of the most rugged topography in the Cascade Range with craggy peaks, spires, ridges, and deep glacial valleys. Geological events occurring many years ago created the diverse topography and drastic elevation changes over the Cascade Range leading to the various climate differences.

The history of the formation of the Cascade Mountains dates back millions of years ago to the late Eocene Epoch. With the North American Plate overriding the Pacific Plate, episodes of volcanic igneous activity persisted. In addition, small fragments of the oceanic and continental lithosphere called terranes created the North Cascades about 50 million years ago.

During the Pleistocene period dating back over two million years ago, glaciation advancing and retreating repeatedly scoured the landscape leaving deposits of rock debris. The U-shaped cross section of the river valleys is a result of recent glaciation. Uplift and faulting in combination with glaciation have been the dominant processes which have created the tall peaks and deep valleys of the North Cascades area.
