= Borealis Glacier =

Glacier in Washington, United States

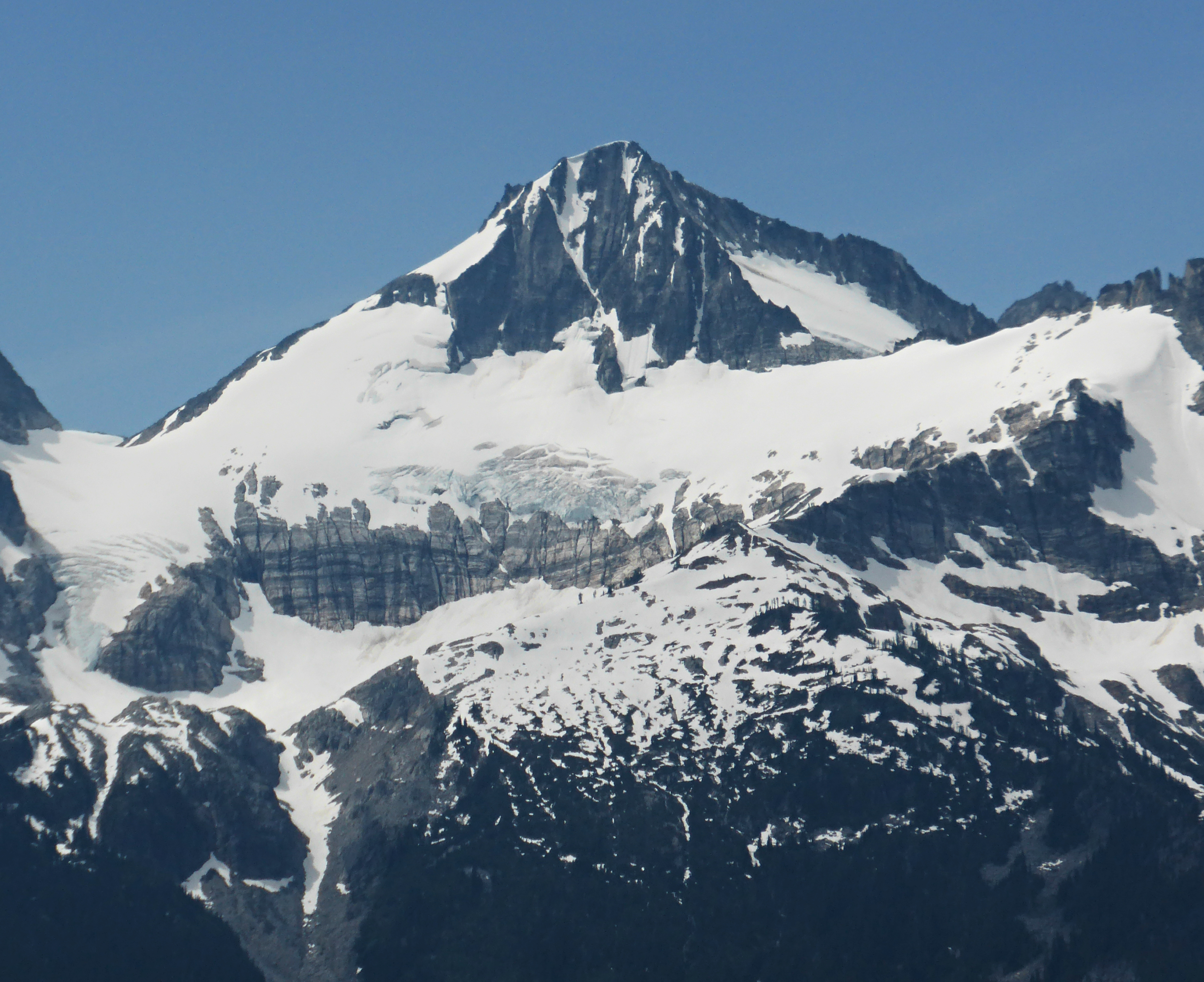
- Borealis Glacier on Primus Peak

- Location within Washington (state)
- Type: Alpine glacier
- Location: Skagit County, Washington, U.S.
- Coordinates: 48°35′34″N 121°05′40″W
- Length: .70 mi (1.13 km)
- Terminus: Icefall and proglacial lake
- Status: Retreating

Borealis Glacier is in North Cascades National Park in the U.S. state of Washington and is on the north slopes of Primus Peak. Borealis Glacier flows generally northeast for a distance of approximately .70 mi (1.13 km). Borealis Glacier descends from nearly 7,200 to 6,000 ft (2,200 to 1,800 m), but is split into an upper and lower sections. The upper section is as much as .90 mi (1.45 km) wide, but ends abruptly in an icefall along some cliffs. The lower section has been retreating significantly, and between 1990 and 2009 lost almost 250 m (820 ft) in length, creating a proglacial lake at the terminus.

== See also ==
- List of glaciers in the United States
