= Klawatti Peak =

Mountain in Washington (state), United States

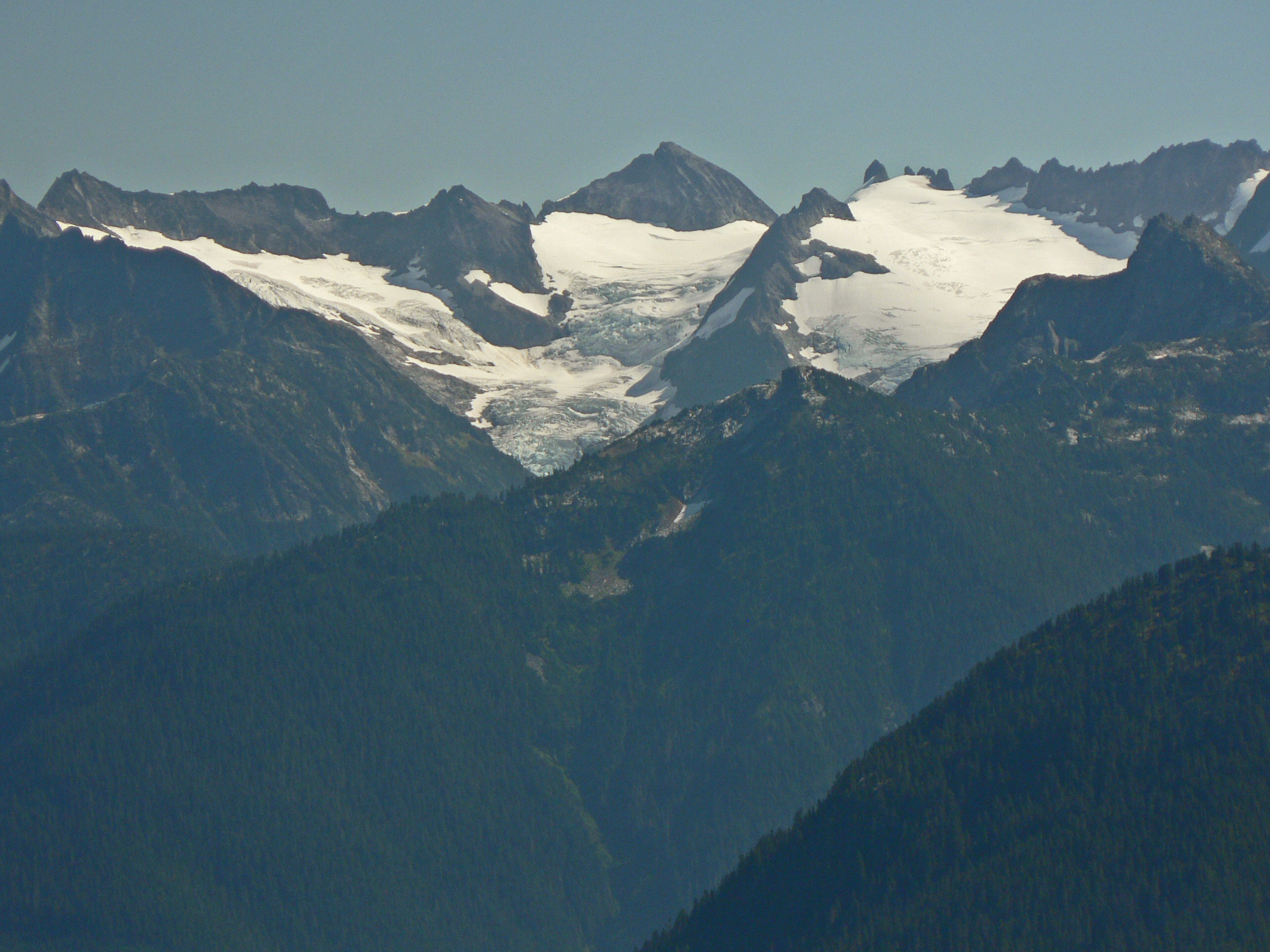
- Klawatti Peak (center) lies between Austera Peak (left) and Tepeh Towers (right). Three-lobed McAllister Glacier covers its northwest face.

Highest point
- Elevation: 8,485 ft (2,586 m)
- Prominence: 685 ft (209 m)
- Coordinates: 48°33′16″N 121°06′16″W

Geography
- Location within Washington (state) Location within the United States
- Country: United States
- State: Washington
- County: Skagit
- Protected area: North Cascades National Park; Stephen Mather Wilderness
- Parent range: Cascade Range
- Topo map: USGS Forbidden Peak

Geology
- Rock type: Eldorado Orthogneiss

Climbing
- First ascent: 1940 by Lloyd Anderson, Karl Boyer, Tom Gorton

Klawatti Peak (8,485 feet (2,586 m)) is located in North Cascades National Park in the U.S. state of Washington. Klawatti Peak is a nunatak, a peak surrounded by glaciers. These are Klawatti Glacier to the east, McAllister Glacier to the northwest and Inspiration Glacier to the south.

== Climate ==
Klawatti Peak is located in the marine west coast climate zone of western North America. Most weather fronts coming off the Pacific Ocean travel northeast toward the Cascade Mountains. As fronts approach the North Cascades, they are forced upward by the peaks of the Cascade Range (orographic lift), causing them to drop their moisture in the form of rain or snowfall onto the Cascades. As a result, the west side of the North Cascades experiences high precipitation, especially during the winter months in the form of snowfall. During winter months, weather is usually cloudy, but due to high pressure systems over the Pacific Ocean that intensify during summer months, there is often little or no cloud cover during the summer. In terms of favorable weather, July through September are best for climbing.

== Geology ==
The North Cascades features some of the most rugged topography in the Cascade Range with craggy peaks and ridges, deep glacial valleys, and granite spires. Geological events occurring many years ago created the diverse topography and drastic elevation changes over the Cascade Range leading to various climate differences.

The history of the formation of the Cascade Mountains dates back millions of years ago to the late Eocene Epoch. With the North American Plate overriding the Pacific Plate, episodes of volcanic igneous activity persisted. In addition, small fragments of the oceanic and continental lithosphere called terranes created the North Cascades about 50 million years ago.

During the Pleistocene period dating back over two million years ago, glaciation advancing and retreating repeatedly scoured the landscape leaving deposits of rock debris. The U-shaped cross section of the river valleys is a result of recent glaciation. Uplift and faulting in combination with glaciation have been the dominant processes which have created the tall peaks and deep valleys of the North Cascades area.

== Gallery ==
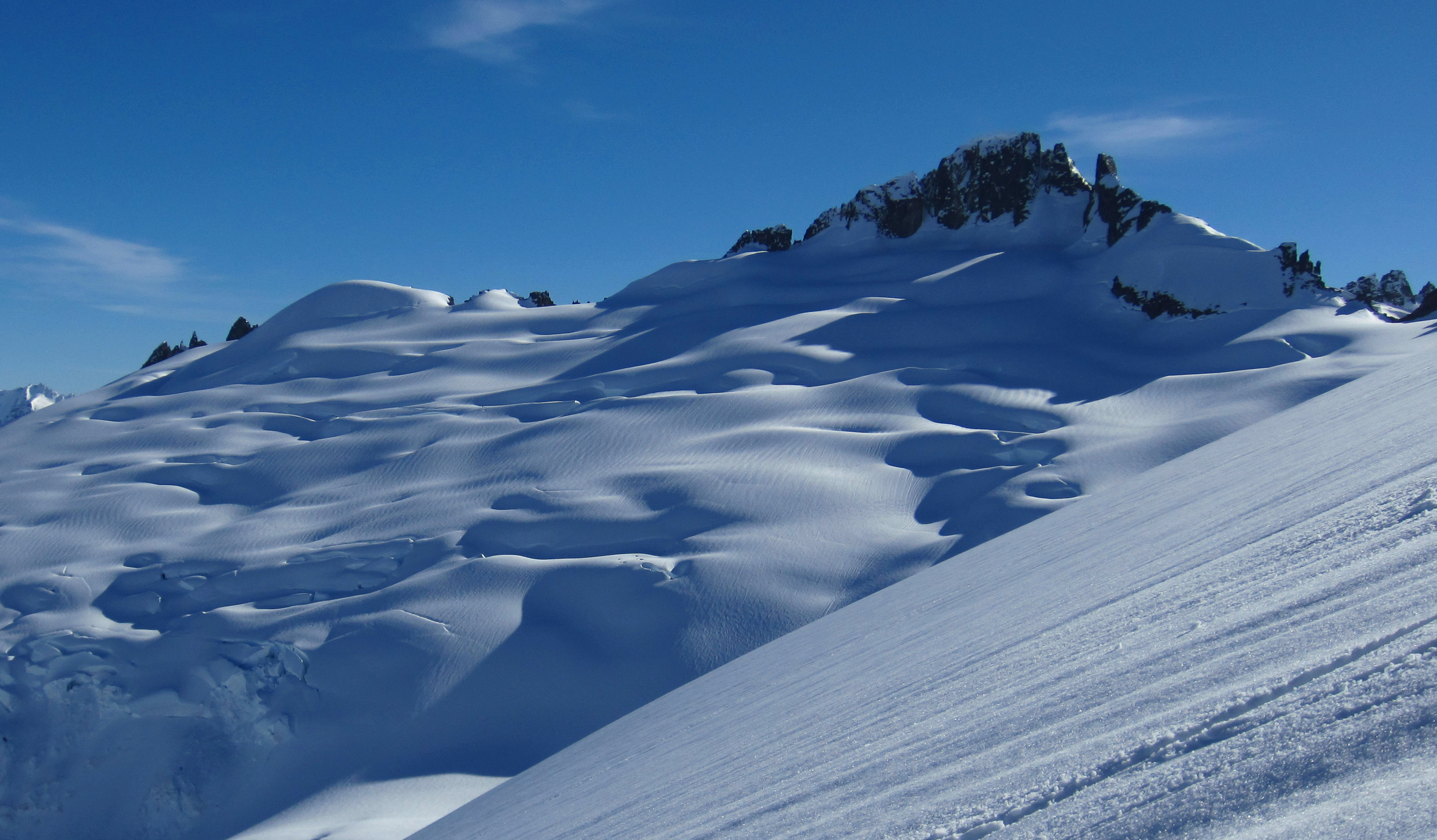
Klawatti Peak and Klawatti Glacier

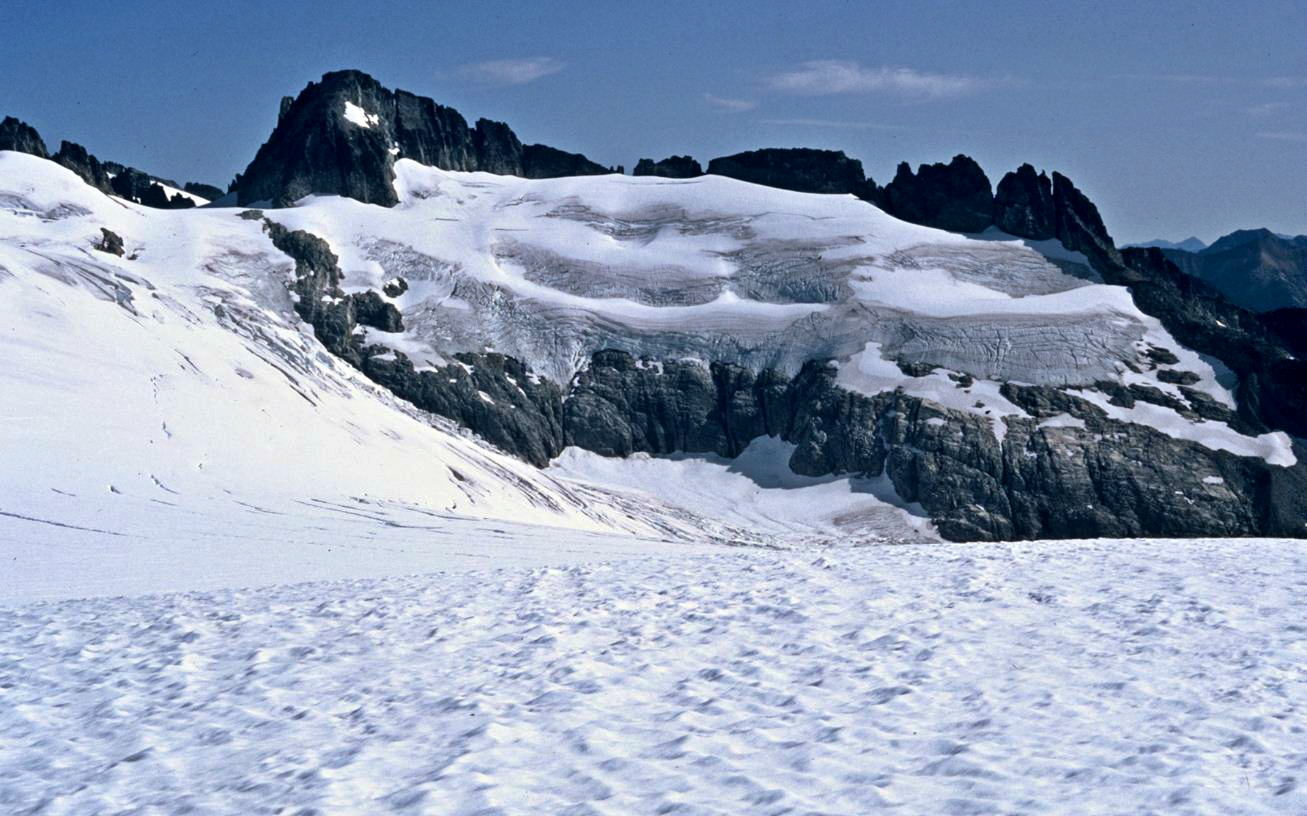
Klawatti Peak and Inspiration Glacier

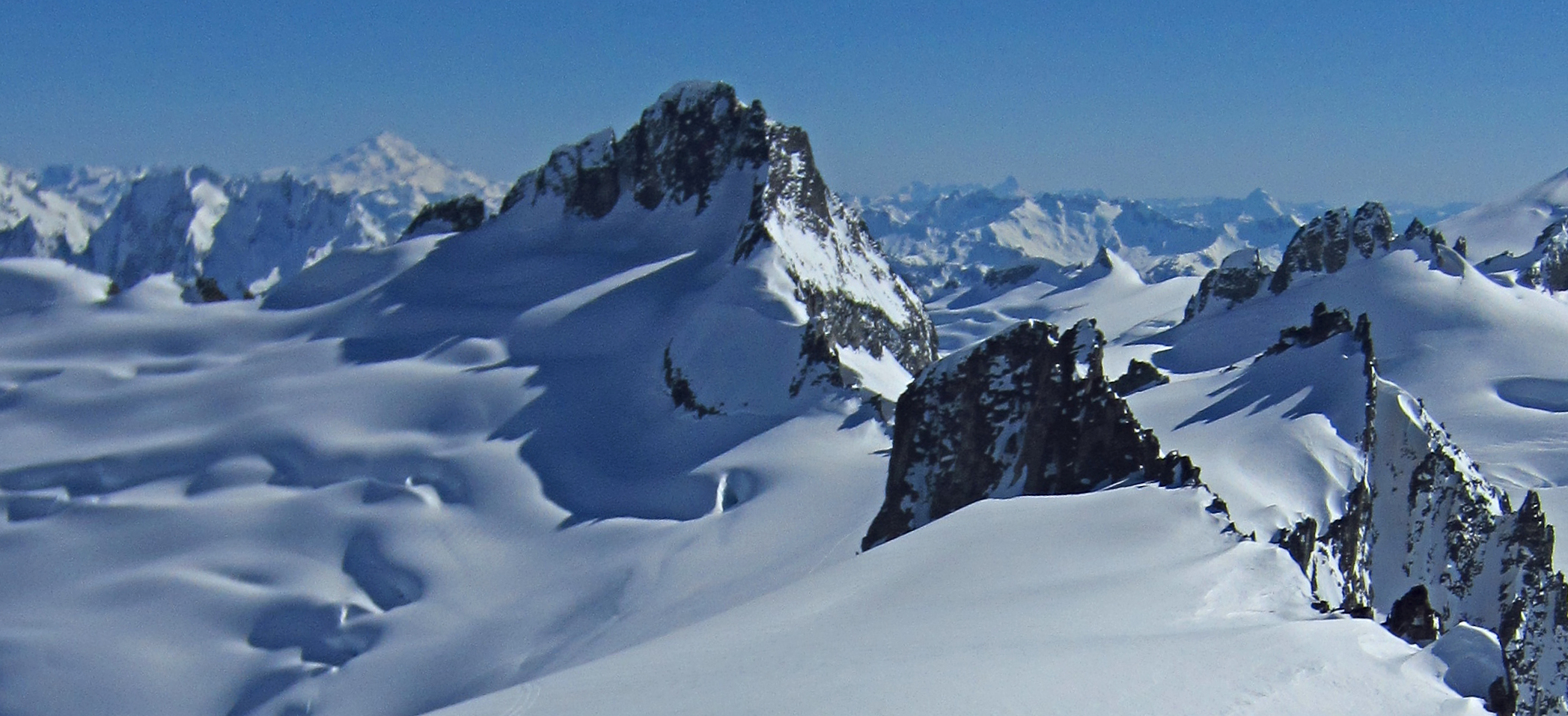
Klawatti from Austera
