= Eldorado Peak =

Mountain in Washington (state), United States

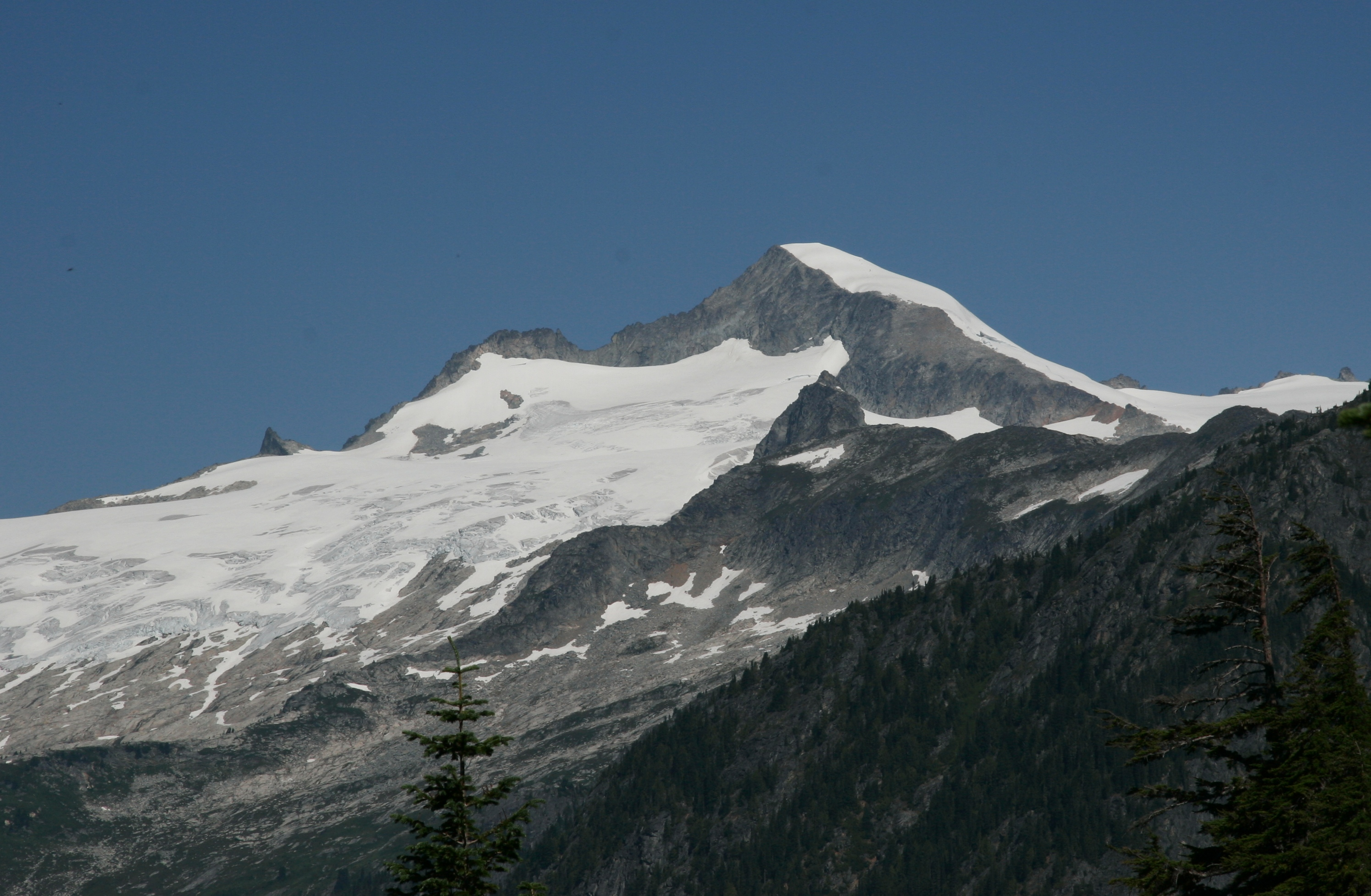
- Eldorado Peak and Eldorado Glacier

Highest point
- Elevation: 8,872.9 feet (2,704.5 m) ± 30 centimetres (12 in)
- Prominence: 2,188 ft (667 m)
- Coordinates: 48°32′15″N 121°08′04″W

Geography
- Location within Washington (state)
- Location: Skagit County, Washington, U.S.
- Parent range: North Cascades
- Topo map: USGS Eldorado Peak

Geology
- Rock age: Cretaceous
- Mountain type: Orthogneiss

Climbing
- First ascent: August 27, 1933 by Donald Blair, Norval Grigg, Arthur Winder and Arthur Wilson
- Easiest route: East Ridge, class 2

Eldorado Peak is a 8,872.9 feet (2,704.5 m) peak, and is the 25th highest peak in Washington. The mountain is located in the North Cascades of Washington, approximately 27 miles (43 km) east of Concrete. It is located in North Cascades National Park at the head of Marble Creek and just west of the Inspiration Glacier. Other glaciers in the immediate vicinity include Eldorado Glacier and McAllister Glacier; thus Eldorado is flanked by the largest continuous non-volcanic ice sheet in the lower 48 states.

In the mid-twentieth century, Eldorado Peak was one of five icecap summits in the lower 48 states, but due to climate change its ice melted down and the highest summit is now a rock 11.8 feet (3.6 m) below the prior icecap.

== Climbing ==
Eldorado appears quite different depending on the side one is viewing. On the west side the peak is a steep face made of vertical slabs and small gullies. From the east side the mountain is a small rocky outcropping surrounded by ice. The south face is a triangular face flanked by long ridgelines. The most popular and easiest climbing route is from the south and east, via the Inspiration Glacier and a moderately steep snow ridge. Eldorado is a popular climbing destination due to easy access, being one of the 100 highest peaks in Washington, and superb mountain views. Most climbers will take two days to complete the trip, though the climb can be completed in one long day.

=== Routes ===
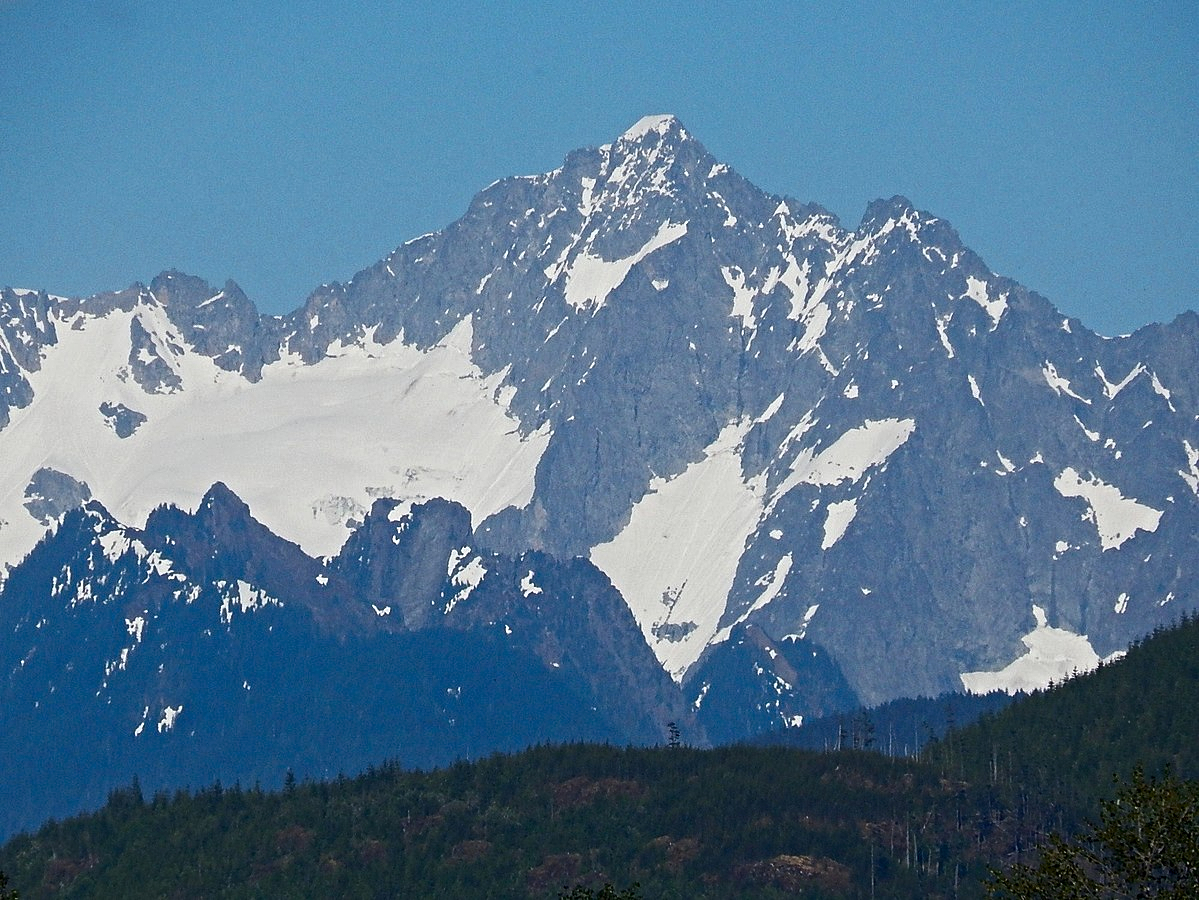
Eldorado Peak west aspect

- West Arete rock route up the west face class 5.8 Grade IV
- East ridge Glacier travel to steep snow ascent class 2
- Northeast ridge ice and snow ascent Class AI2
- Northwest Ice Corridor ice and rock class M3 to M4

== Geology ==
Eldorado is very simple geologically when compared to other mountains in the Cascades, with only one major rock type, Cretaceous orthogneiss, more specifically biotite granodiorite. Only the lowest flanks are made of different rock types, mostly heterogeneous metamorphic rock. There are only two normal faults: one on the east flank, the other on the west flank.

== Climate ==
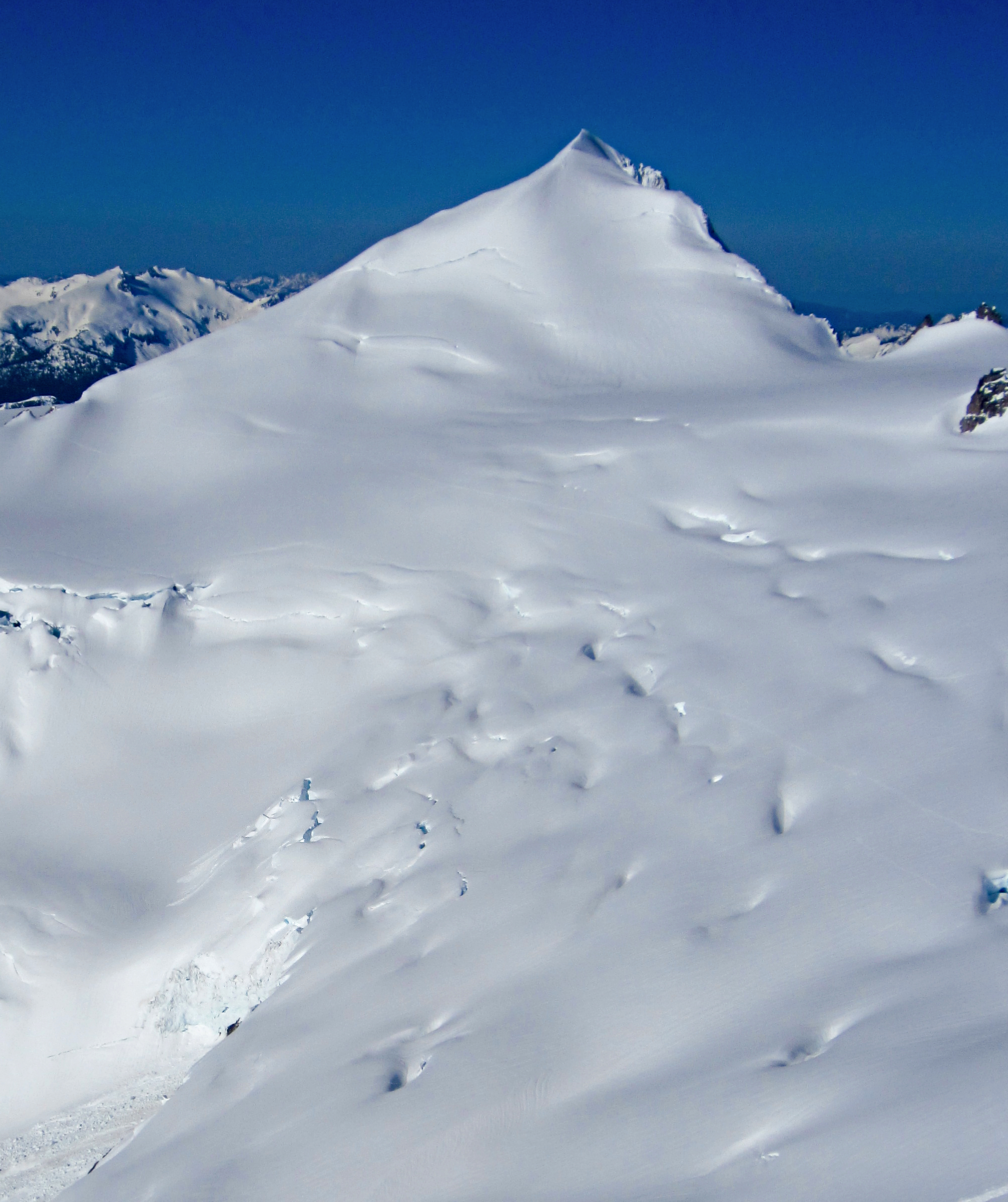
Eldorado Peak from Klawatti Peak

Eldorado Peak is located in the marine west coast climate zone of western North America. Most weather fronts originate in the Pacific Ocean, and travel northeast toward the Cascade Mountains. As fronts approach the North Cascades, they are forced upward by the peaks of the Cascade Range (Orographic lift), causing them to drop their moisture in the form of rain or snowfall onto the Cascades. As a result, the west side of the North Cascades experiences high precipitation, especially during the winter months in the form of snowfall. Due to its temperate climate and proximity to the Pacific Ocean, areas west of the Cascade Crest very rarely experience temperatures below 0 °F (−18 °C) or above 80 °F (27 °C). During winter months, weather is usually cloudy, but, due to high pressure systems over the Pacific Ocean that intensify during summer months, there is often little or no cloud cover during the summer. Because of maritime influence, snow tends to be wet and heavy, resulting in high avalanche danger.

== See also ==
- List of mountains of the United States
