= North Klawatti Glacier =

Glacier in the state of Washington

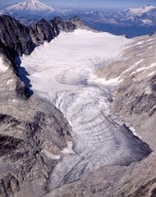
- North Klawatti Glacier

- Location within Washington (state)
- Type: Valley glacier
- Location: North Cascades National Park, Skagit County, Washington, U.S.
- Coordinates: 48°33′55″N 121°04′39″W
- Length: 1.4 mi (2.3 km)
- Terminus: Icefall
- Status: Retreating

North Klawatti Glacier lies in a cirque to the east of Austera Peak, North Cascades National Park, in the U.S. state of Washington. The glacier is approximately 1.4 mi (2.3 km) in length, .40 mi (0.64 km) in width at its widest and descends from 7,800 to 6,000 ft (2,400 to 1,800 m), where it terminates above Klawatti Lake. An arête divides North Klawatti Glacier from Klawatti Glacier to the south. In 1993, it had an area of 1.48 km^{2}. The North Klawatti Glacier was one of four glaciers selected for glacier mass balance research. From 1993 (when monitoring began) to 2013 the glacier had lost ~8 m of thickness.

== See also ==
- List of glaciers in the United States
