= Inspiration Glacier =

Glacier in the state of Washington

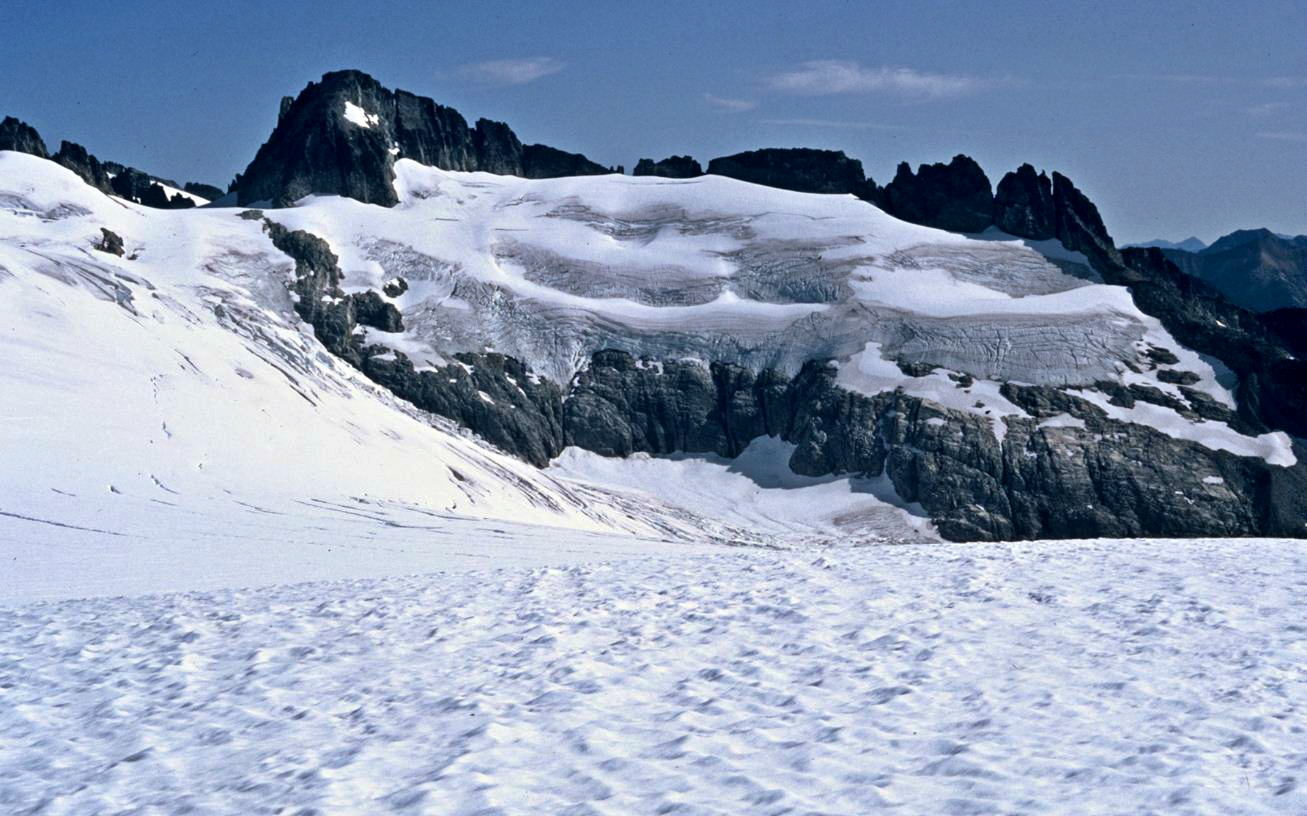

- Location within Washington (state)
- Type: Mountain glacier
- Location: North Cascades National Park, Skagit County, Washington, U.S.
- Coordinates: 48°32′05″N 121°07′02″W
- Length: 1.5 mi (2.4 km)
- Terminus: Icefall/barren rock
- Status: Retreating

Inspiration Glacier is on the east slopes of Eldorado Peak, North Cascades National Park in the U.S. state of Washington. The glacier is approximately 1.5 mi (2.4 km) in length, 2 mi (3.2 km) in width at its terminus and descends from 8,500 to 6,800 ft (2,600 to 2,100 m). Inspiration Glacier lies in a cirque with Eldorado Peak to the west, the arête known as Tepeh Towers to the northwest and Klawatti Peak to the northeast. Inspiration Glacier is connected to the Eldorado Glacier to the south and partially separated by the Tepeh Towers from the McAllister Glacier to the north. Meltwaters from Inspiration Glacier flow into Moraine Lake.

== See also ==
- List of glaciers in the United States
