= McAllister Glacier =

Glacier in the state of Washington

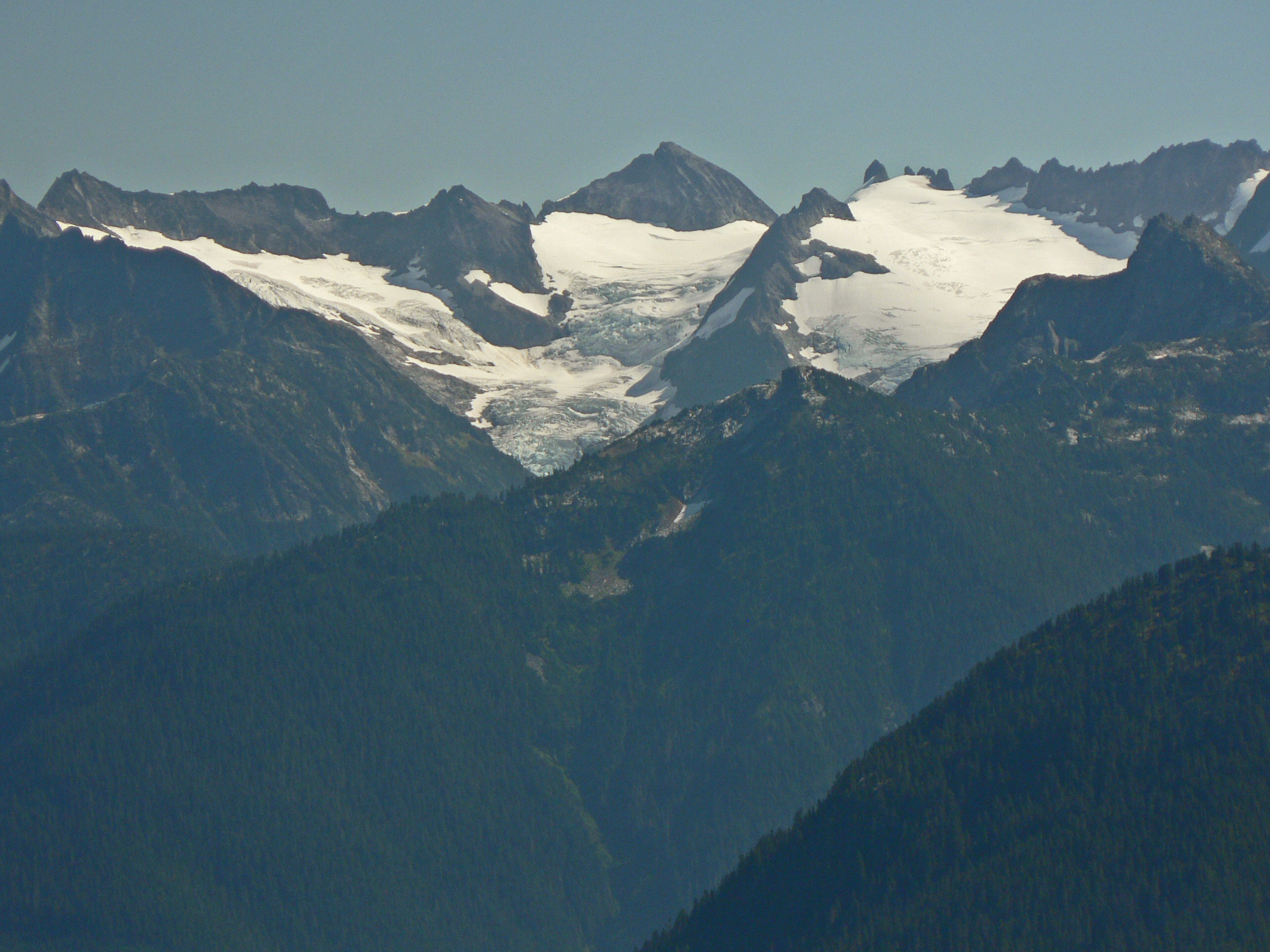
- McAllister Glacier in 2007

- Location within Washington (state)
- Type: Mountain glacier
- Location: North Cascades National Park, Skagit County, Washington, U.S.
- Coordinates: 48°33′24″N 121°07′49″W
- Length: 1.85 mi (2.98 km)
- Terminus: Icefall
- Status: Retreating

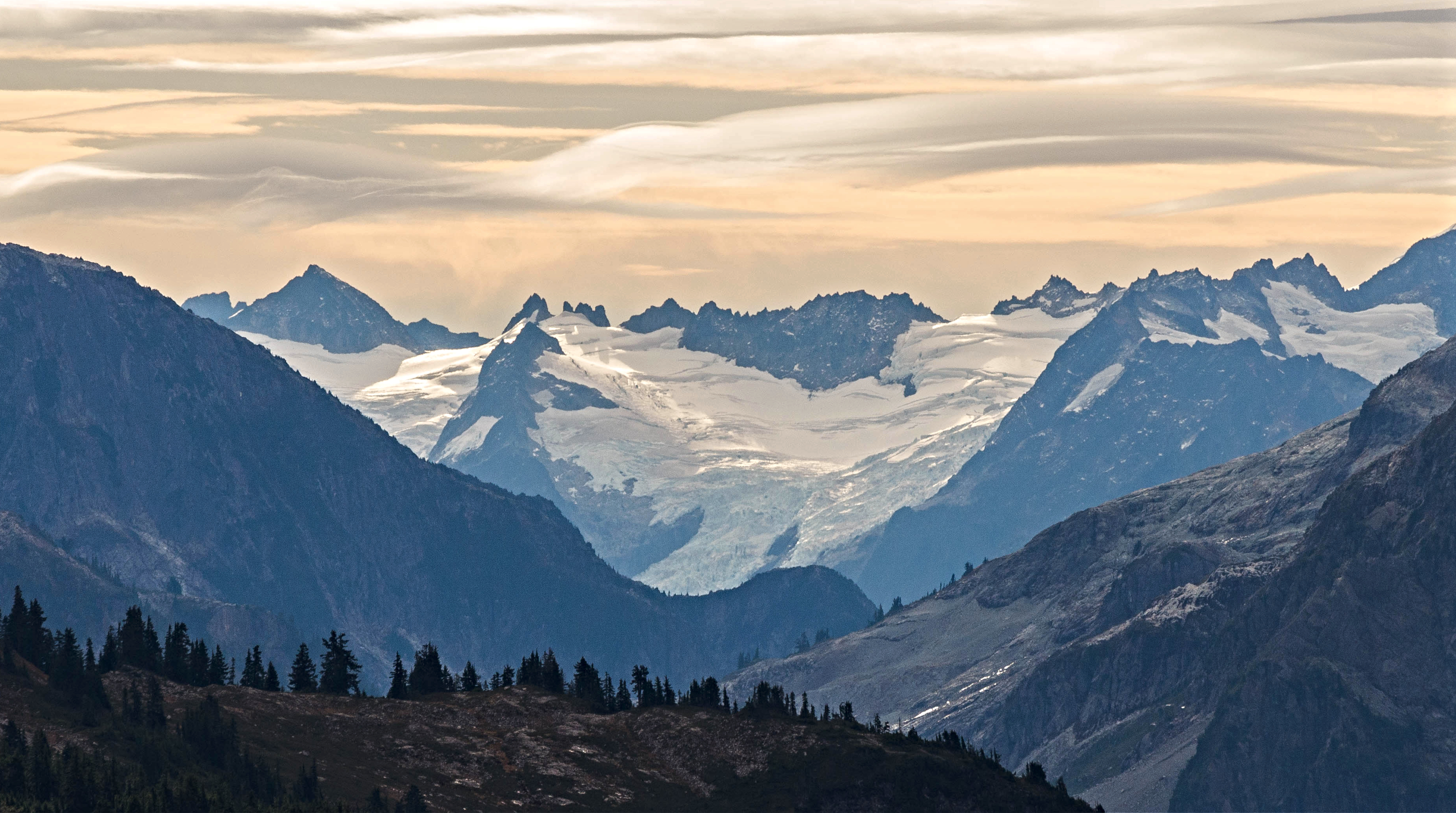
McAllister Glacier

McAllister Glacier is in a large cirque to the north and east of Dorado Needle, North Cascades National Park, in the U.S. state of Washington. The glacier is approximately 1.85 mi (2.98 km) in length, 1.5 mi (2.4 km) in width at its terminus and descends from 8,000 to 4,500 ft (2,400 to 1,400 m), where it terminates near a proglacial lake. McAllister Glacier is nearly connected to Inspiration Glacier to the south and the two glaciers are separated by the arête known as Tepeh Towers. Klawatti Peak and an arete extending north from that peak separate McAllister Glacier from the Klawatti Glacier to the east. Like most glaciers in the North Cascades, McAllister Glacier is retreating and retreated approximately 1350 ft (410 m) between 1975 and 2009.

== See also ==
- List of glaciers in the United States
