= Mount Tommy Thompson =

Mountain in Washington (state), United States

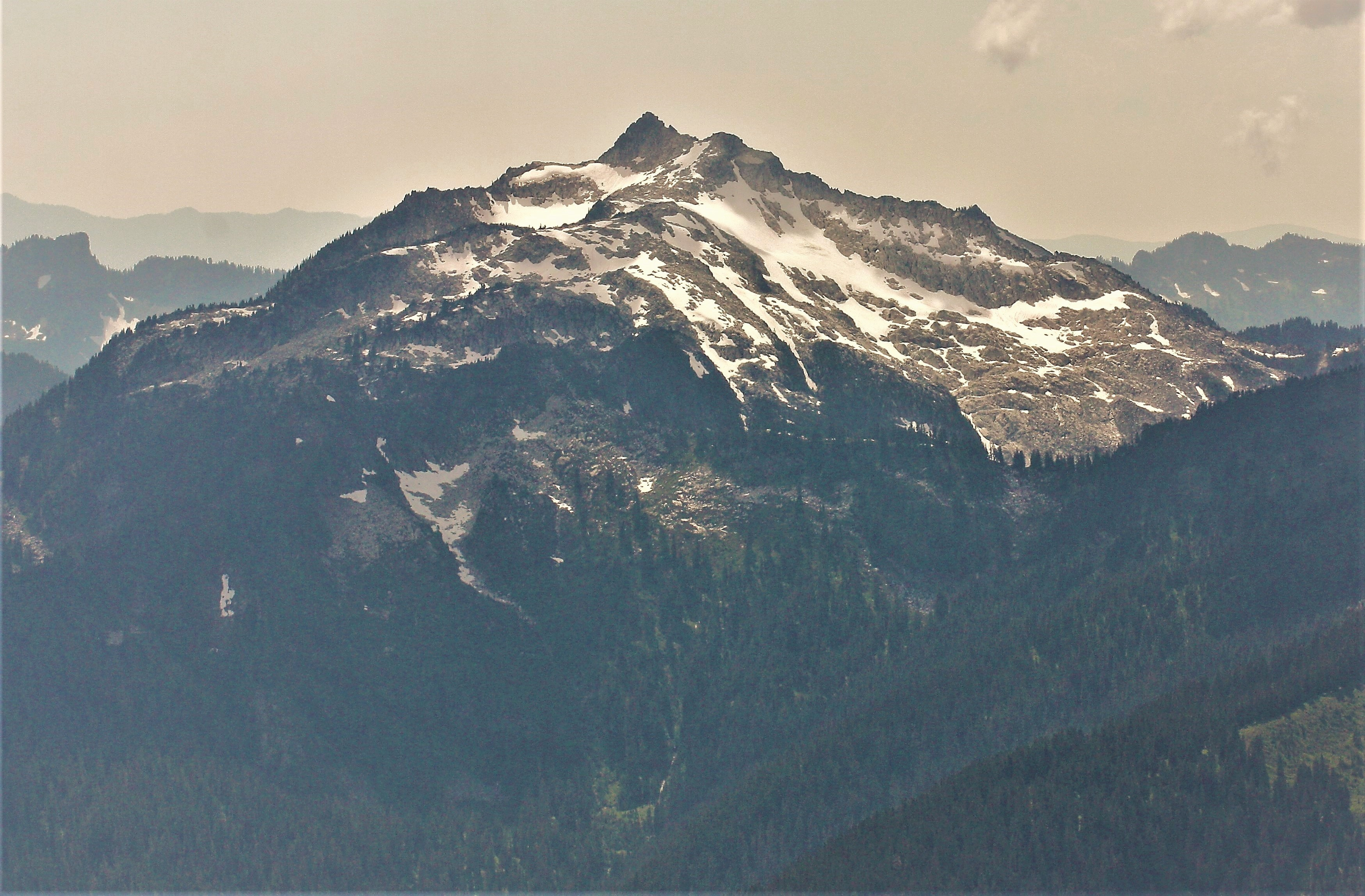
- Northeast aspect, from Hidden Lake Peaks

Highest point
- Elevation: 6,780 ft (2,067 m)
- Prominence: 1,620 ft (490 m)
- Parent peak: Peak 7425
- Isolation: 3.16 mi (5.09 km)
- Coordinates: 48°26′45″N 121°19′03″W

Geography
- Location within Washington (state) Location within the United States
- Interactive map of Mount Tommy Thompson
- Country: United States
- State: Washington
- County: Skagit
- Protected area: Glacier Peak Wilderness
- Parent range: North Cascades
- Topo map: USGS Snowking Mountain

Mount Tommy Thompson is a 6,780-foot-elevation (2,070-meter) mountain summit located in Skagit County of Washington state. It is situated eight miles southeast of the town of Marblemount, within the Glacier Peak Wilderness, on land managed by Mount Baker–Snoqualmie National Forest, on the west slopes of the North Cascades Range. The nearest higher named neighbor is Snowking Mountain, 3.16 miles (5.09 km) to the southeast. Topographic relief is significant as the southwest aspect rises 3,670 feet (1,120 meters) above Slide Lake in less than two miles. Precipitation runoff from Mount Tommy Thompson drains into tributaries of the Skagit River.

== Etymology ==
The mountain is unofficially named in honor of forest ranger Tommy Thompson (1884–1969). Born in England, his family immigrated to the United States in 1885. Tommy worked for the Forest Service from 1904 to 1943 in the Skagit district of the North Cascades. He made the first ascent of Ruby Mountain in 1916.

== Climate ==
Mount Tommy Thompson is located in the marine west coast climate zone of western North America. Most weather fronts coming off the Pacific Ocean travel northeast toward the Cascade Mountains. As fronts approach the North Cascades, they are forced upward by the peaks of the Cascade Range (orographic lift), causing them to drop their moisture in the form of rain or snowfall onto the Cascades. As a result, the west side of the North Cascades experiences high precipitation, especially during the winter months in the form of snowfall. Because of maritime influence, snow tends to be wet and heavy, resulting in high avalanche danger. During winter months, weather is usually cloudy, but, due to high pressure systems over the Pacific Ocean that intensify during summer months, there is often little or no cloud cover during the summer.

== Geology ==
The North Cascades features some of the most rugged topography in the Cascade Range with craggy peaks and ridges, deep glacial valleys, and granite spires. Geological events occurring many years ago created the diverse topography and drastic elevation changes over the Cascade Range leading to the various climate differences.

The history of the formation of the Cascade Mountains dates back millions of years ago to the late Eocene Epoch. With the North American Plate overriding the Pacific Plate, episodes of volcanic igneous activity persisted. In addition, small fragments of the oceanic and continental lithosphere called terranes created the North Cascades about 50 million years ago.

During the Pleistocene period dating back over two million years ago, glaciation advancing and retreating repeatedly scoured the landscape leaving deposits of rock debris. The U-shaped cross section of the river valleys is a result of recent glaciation. Uplift and faulting in combination with glaciation have been the dominant processes which have created the tall peaks and deep valleys of the North Cascades area.

== Gallery ==
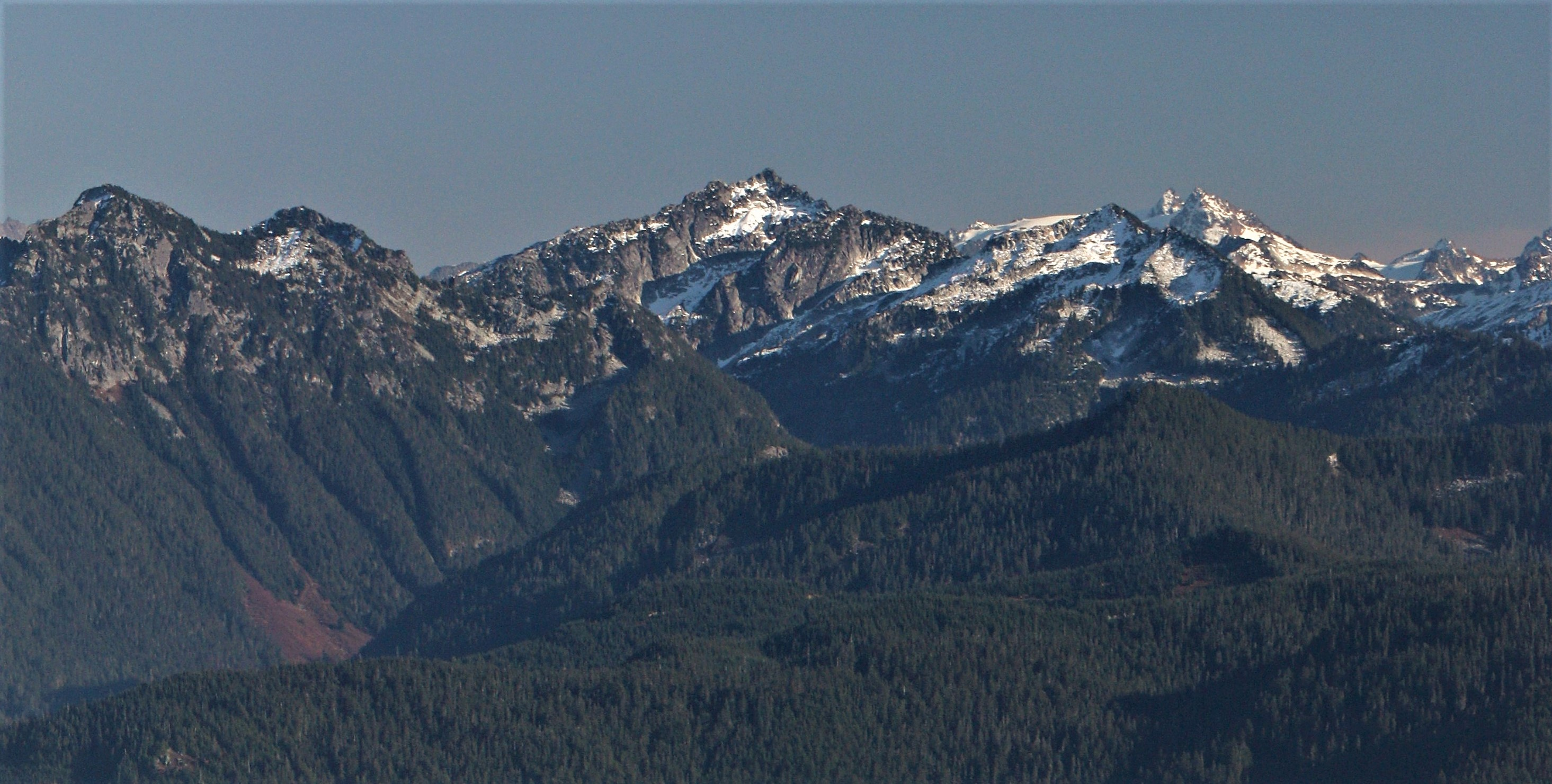
Northwest aspect of Mount Tommy Thompson (centered) seen from Sauk Mountain

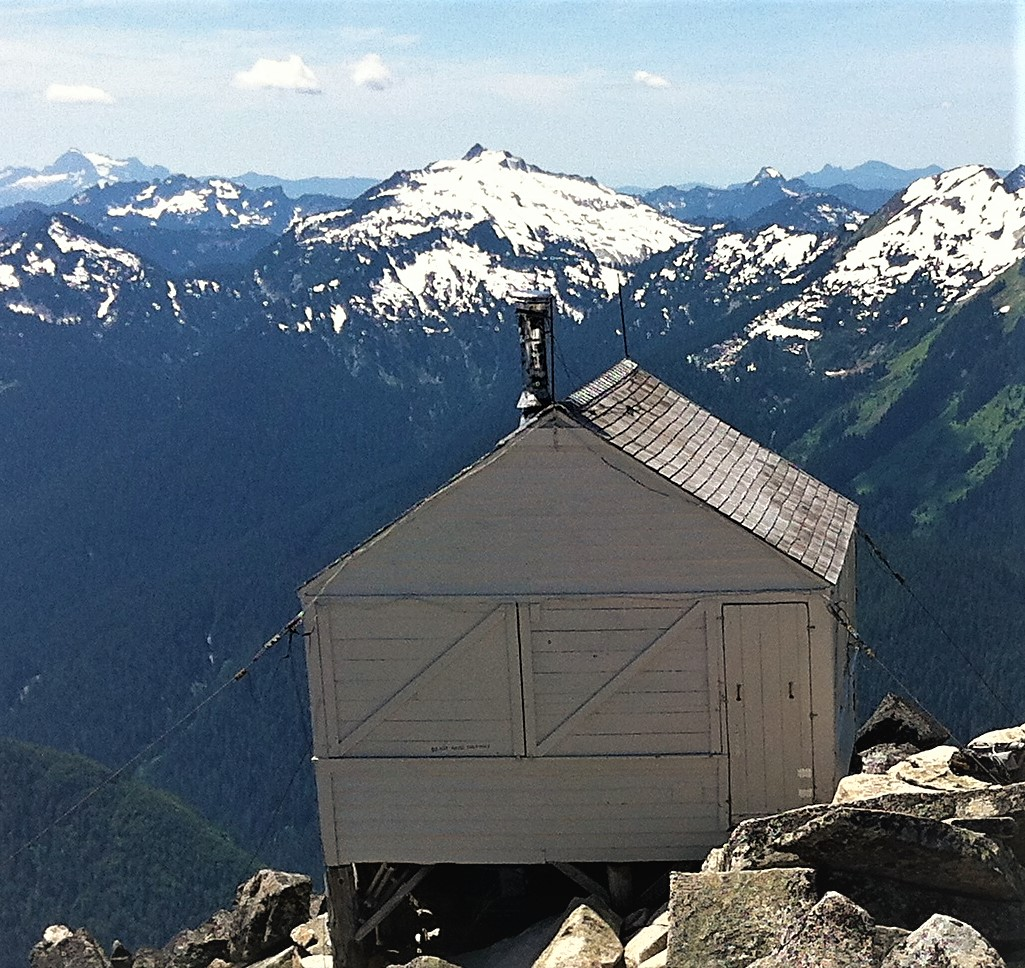
Mt. Tommy Thompson seen from Hidden Lake Peak Lookout
