= The Triad (mountain) =

Mountain in Washington (state), United States

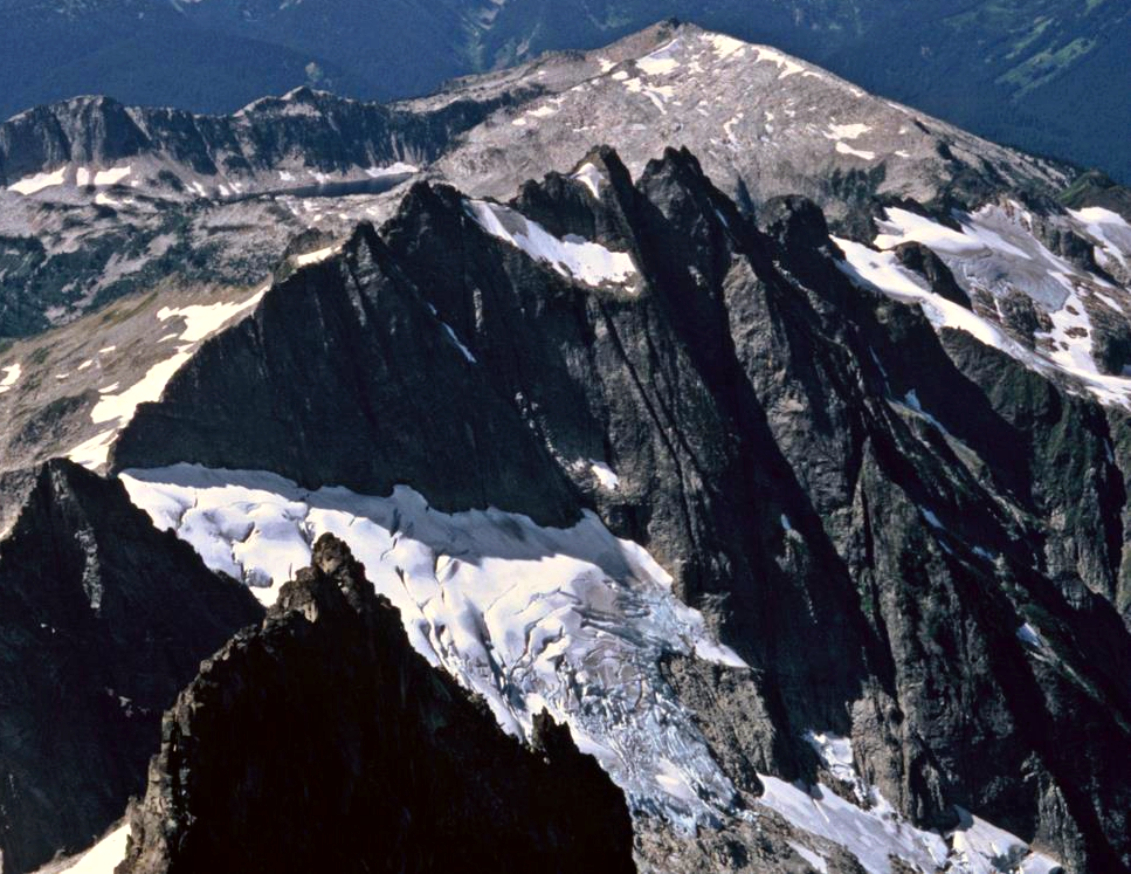
- The Triad seen from Eldorado Peak

Highest point
- Elevation: 7,520+ ft (2,290+ m)
- Prominence: 760 ft (230 m)
- Parent peak: Eldorado Peak (8,868 ft)
- Isolation: 1.84 mi (2.96 km)
- Coordinates: 48°31′11″N 121°09′47″W

Geography
- Location within Washington (state) Location within the United States
- Interactive map of The Triad
- Country: United States
- State: Washington
- County: Skagit
- Protected area: North Cascades National Park
- Parent range: North Cascades
- Topo map: USGS Eldorado Peak

Geology
- Rock age: Eocene to Late Cretaceous
- Rock type: Granodioritic Orthogneiss

Climbing
- First ascent: 1949 Dick Eilertsen, Dick Lowery, Dick Scales, Don Wilde
- Easiest route: Scrambling class 4

The Triad is a mountain with three peaks located in the North Cascades, in Skagit County of Washington state. Situated in North Cascades National Park, The Triad is positioned west of the crest of the Cascade Range, approximately 12 miles east of the town of Marblemount. The middle peak (highest) has an elevation of 7,520+ ft (2,290+ m), the west peak 7,440+ ft (2,270+ m), and the east peak 7,520+ ft (2,290+ m). The popular hiking objective, Hidden Lake Peak Lookout, lies three miles to the southwest, and the nearest higher peak, Eldorado Peak, two miles to the northeast, is a popular mountaineering objective. Precipitation runoff from The Triad drains into tributaries of the Cascade River which in turn is a tributary of the Skagit River. The first ascent of the mountain was made in 1949 by Dick Eilertsen, Dick Lowery, Dick Scales, and Don Wilde. This climbing party which had three identical first names, named it the Three Dicks. However, in the interest of good taste, the more suitable and similar name was adopted since "triad" means a group or set of three connected people or things.

== Climate ==
The Triad is located in the marine west coast climate zone of western North America.

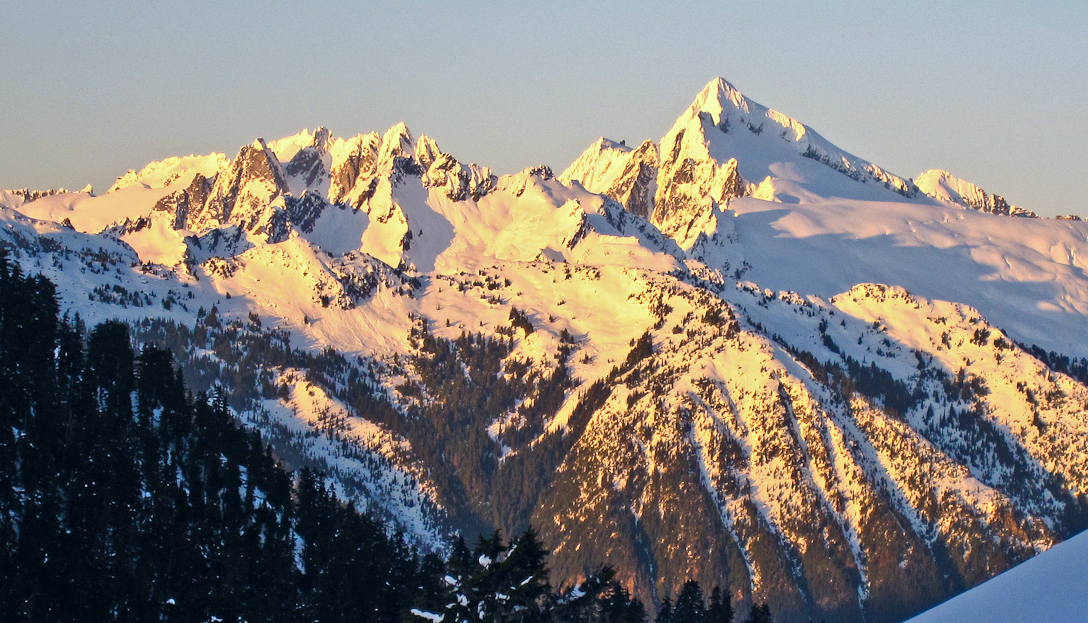
The Triad, Dorado Needle, and Eldorado Peak (right) seen in winter from the Snowking Mountain area

Most weather fronts coming off the Pacific Ocean travel northeast toward the Cascade Mountains. As fronts approach the North Cascades, they are forced upward by the peaks of the Cascade Range (orographic lift), causing them to drop their moisture in the form of rain or snowfall onto the Cascades. As a result, the west side of the North Cascades experiences high precipitation, especially during the winter months in the form of snowfall.Because of maritime influence, snow tends to be wet and heavy, resulting in high avalanche danger. During winter months, weather is usually cloudy, but, due to high pressure systems over the Pacific Ocean that intensify during summer months, there is often little or no cloud cover during the summer. This climate supports a small unnamed glacier on the north slope below the steep walls of the north face.

== Geology ==
The North Cascades features some of the most rugged topography in the Cascade Range with craggy peaks and ridges, deep glacial valleys, and granite spires. Geological events occurring many years ago created the diverse topography and drastic elevation changes over the Cascade Range leading to various climate differences.

The history of the formation of the Cascade Mountains dates back millions of years ago to the late Eocene Epoch. With the North American Plate overriding the Pacific Plate, episodes of volcanic igneous activity persisted. In addition, small fragments of the oceanic and continental lithosphere called terranes created the North Cascades about 50 million years ago.

During the Pleistocene period dating back over two million years ago, glaciation advancing and retreating repeatedly scoured the landscape leaving deposits of rock debris. The U-shaped cross section of the river valleys is a result of recent glaciation. Uplift and faulting in combination with glaciation have been the dominant processes which have created the tall peaks and deep valleys of the North Cascades area.

== Access ==
The trailhead for Hidden Lake Trail #745 to access The Triad is located at the end of five mile long Forest Service Road #1540, which junctions 9.5 miles up the Cascade River Road from Marblemount. The steep trail starts in forest then transitions to wonderful wildflower filled meadows before climbing high into heather and rock gardens. From this transition zone the route leaves the trail to bear east and up to the top of the ridge where a boot path reappears.

== Gallery ==
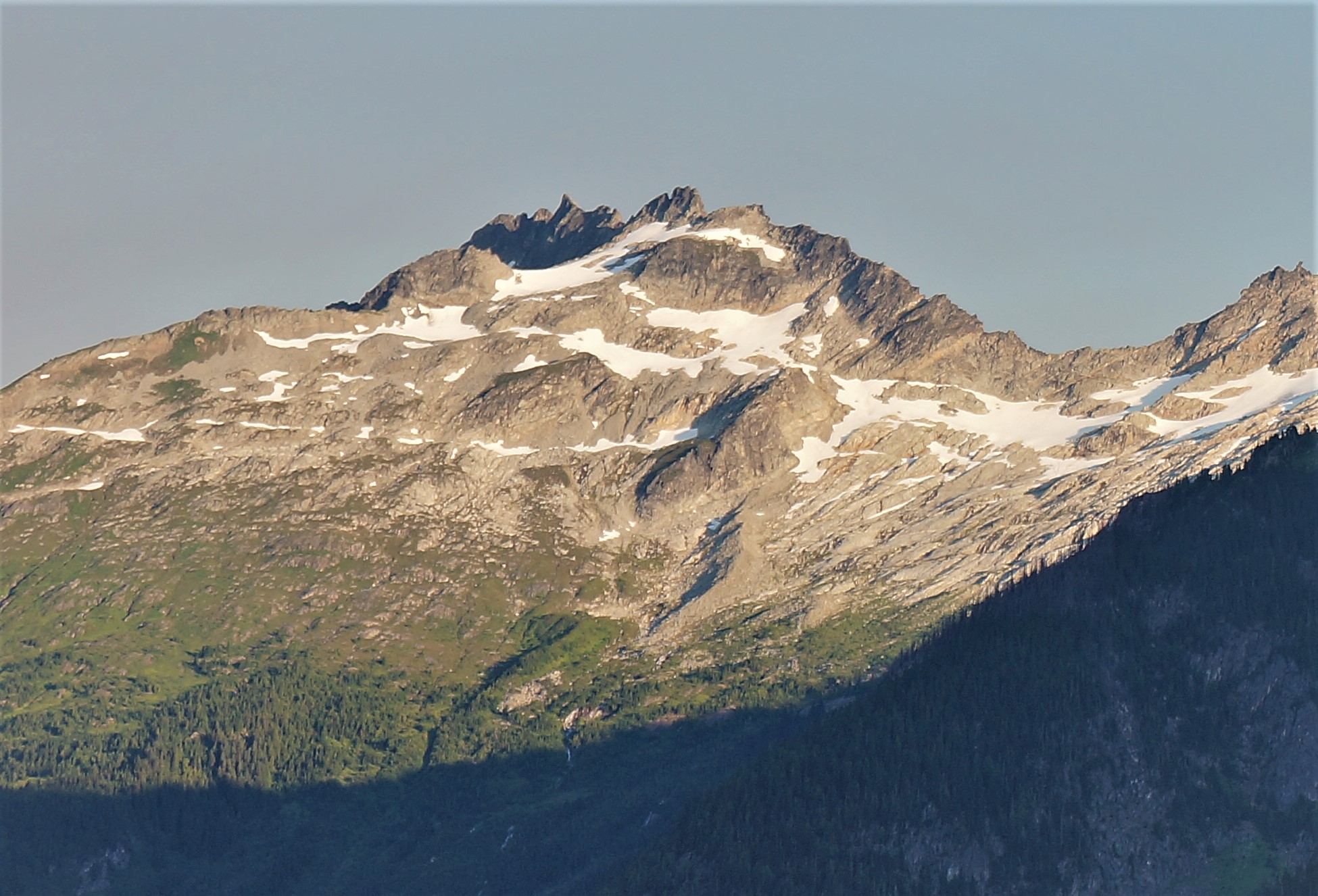
The Triad from Sahale Mountain

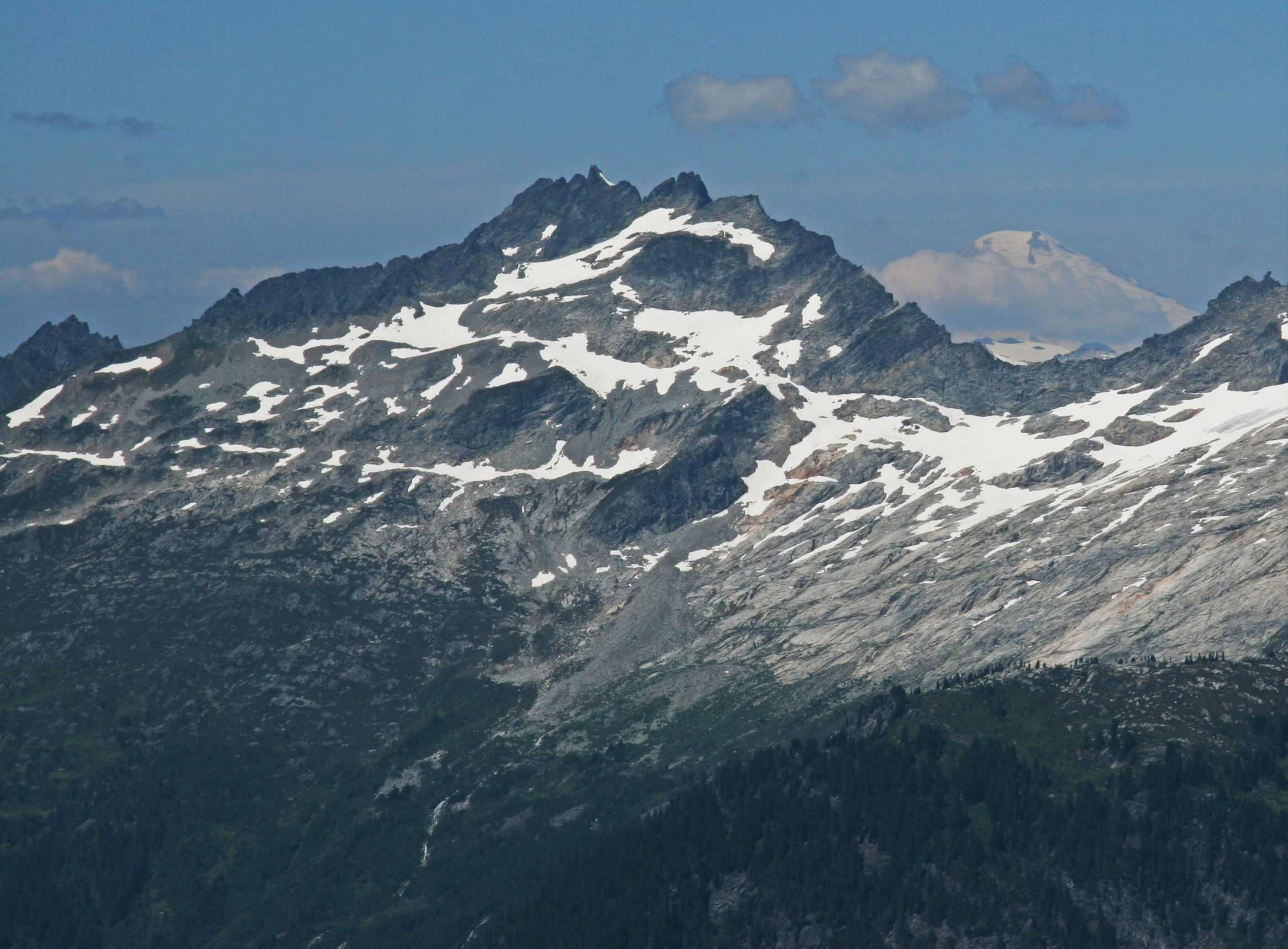
The Triad from Sahale Mountain

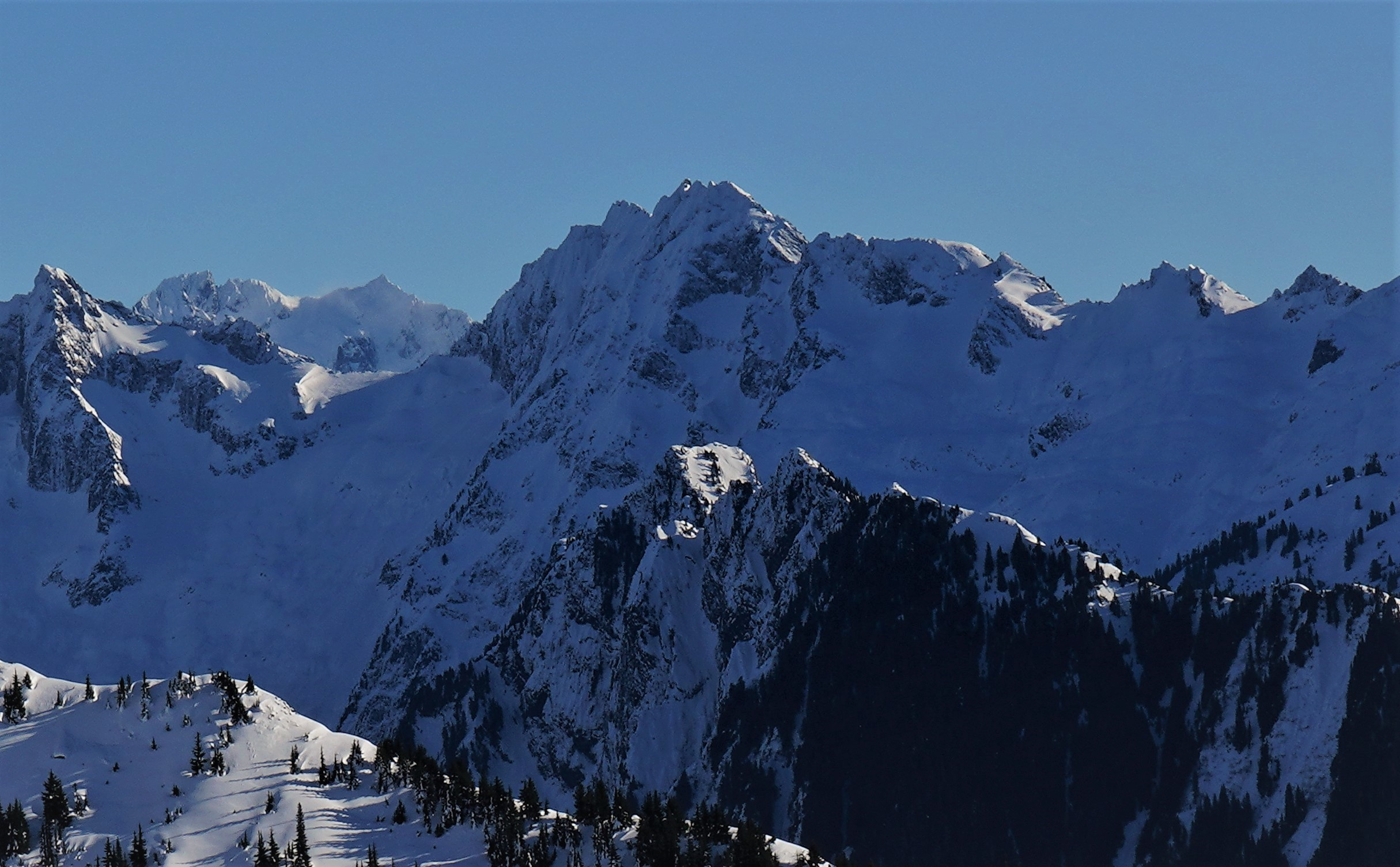
West aspect

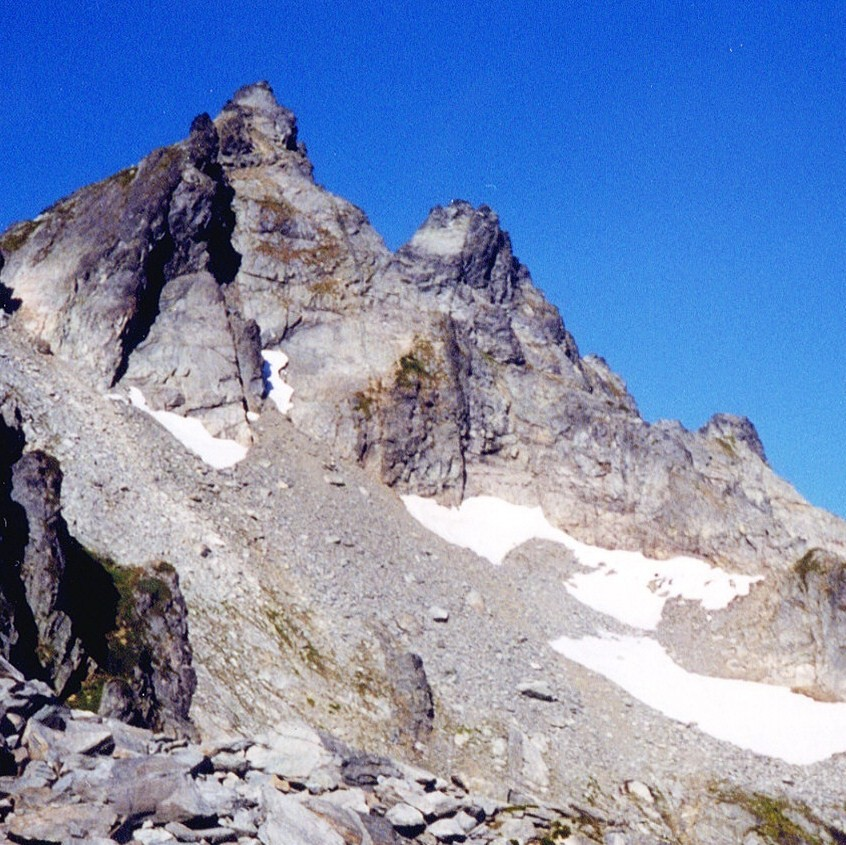
The Triad from WSW

== See also ==
- Geography of Washington (state)
- Geology of the Pacific Northwest
