= Mount Chaval =

Mountain in Washington (state), United States

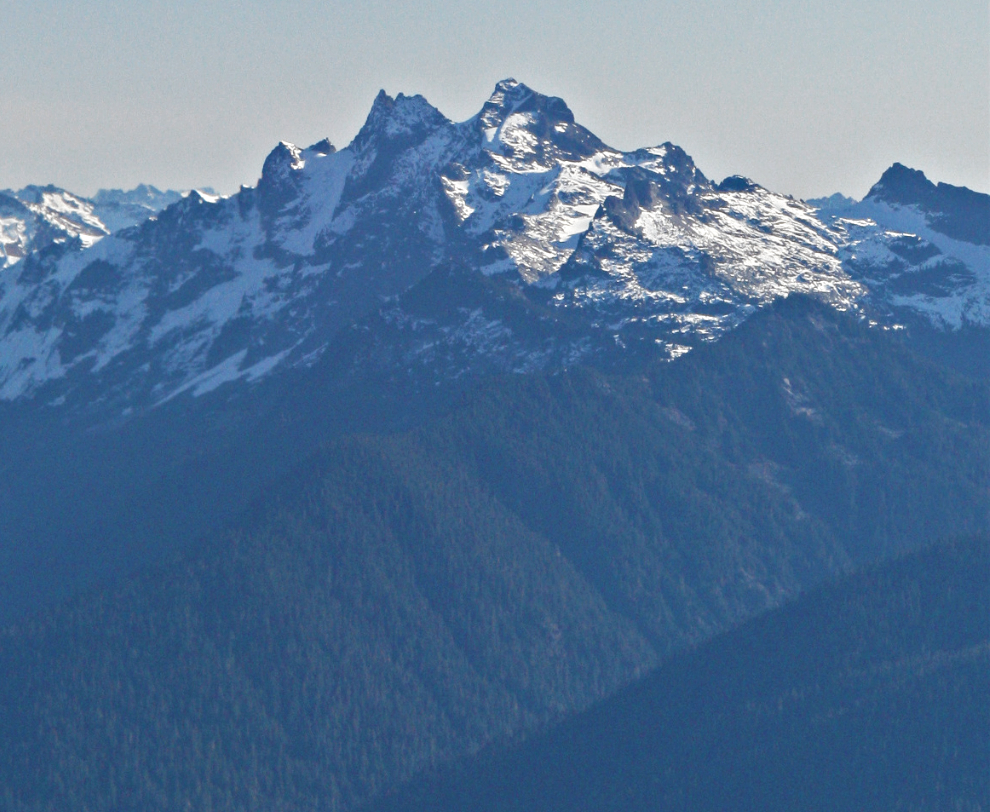
- Mount Chaval seen from Sauk Mountain

Highest point
- Elevation: 7,127 ft (2,172 m)
- Prominence: 1,807 ft (551 m)
- Parent peak: Snowking Mountain (7,433 ft)
- Isolation: 2.59 mi (4.17 km)
- Coordinates: 48°22′34″N 121°19′32″W

Geography
- Location within Washington (state) Location within the United States
- Interactive map of Mount Chaval
- Country: United States
- State: Washington
- County: Skagit
- Protected area: Glacier Peak Wilderness
- Parent range: North Cascades
- Topo map: USGS Snowking Mountain

Geology
- Rock age: Late Cretaceous
- Rock type: Chaval pluton

Climbing
- First ascent: September 20, 1946 by Richard Merritt, Keith and Ruth Rankin
- Easiest route: scrambling

Mount Chaval is a craggy 7,127-foot (2,172-metre) mountain summit located in Skagit County of Washington state. Situated within the Glacier Peak Wilderness, Mount Chaval is positioned west of the crest of the North Cascades Range, approximately 15 miles northeast of the town of Darrington. It has two subsidiary peaks, East Peak and Middle Peak, each 7040 ft. The nearest higher neighbor is Snowking Mountain, 2.51 miles (4.04 km) to the northeast. Precipitation runoff from Mount Chaval drains into tributaries of the Skagit River.

== Climate ==
Mount Chaval is located in the marine west coast climate zone of western North America. Weather fronts originating in the Pacific Ocean move northeast toward the Cascade Mountains. As fronts approach the North Cascades, they are forced upward by the peaks of the Cascade Range (orographic lift), causing them to drop their moisture in the form of rain or snowfall onto the Cascades. As a result, the west side of the North Cascades experiences high precipitation, especially during the winter months in the form of snowfall. Because of maritime influence, snow tends to be wet and heavy, resulting in high avalanche danger. During winter months, weather is usually cloudy, but, due to high pressure systems over the Pacific Ocean that intensify during summer months, there is often little or no cloud cover during the summer.

== Geology ==
The North Cascades features some of the most rugged topography in the Cascade Range with craggy peaks and ridges, deep glacial valleys, and granite spires. Geological events occurring many years ago created the diverse topography and drastic elevation changes over the Cascade Range leading to the various climate differences.

The history of the formation of the Cascade Mountains dates back millions of years ago to the late Eocene Epoch. With the North American Plate overriding the Pacific Plate, episodes of volcanic igneous activity persisted. In addition, small fragments of the oceanic and continental lithosphere called terranes created the North Cascades about 50 million years ago. The rock of Mount Chaval is Chaval pluton, a pyroxene-bearing diorite and tonalite.

During the Pleistocene period dating back over two million years ago, glaciation advancing and retreating repeatedly scoured the landscape leaving deposits of rock debris. The U-shaped cross section of the river valleys is a result of recent glaciation. Uplift and faulting in combination with glaciation have been the dominant processes which have created the tall peaks and deep valleys of the North Cascades area.

== Gallery ==
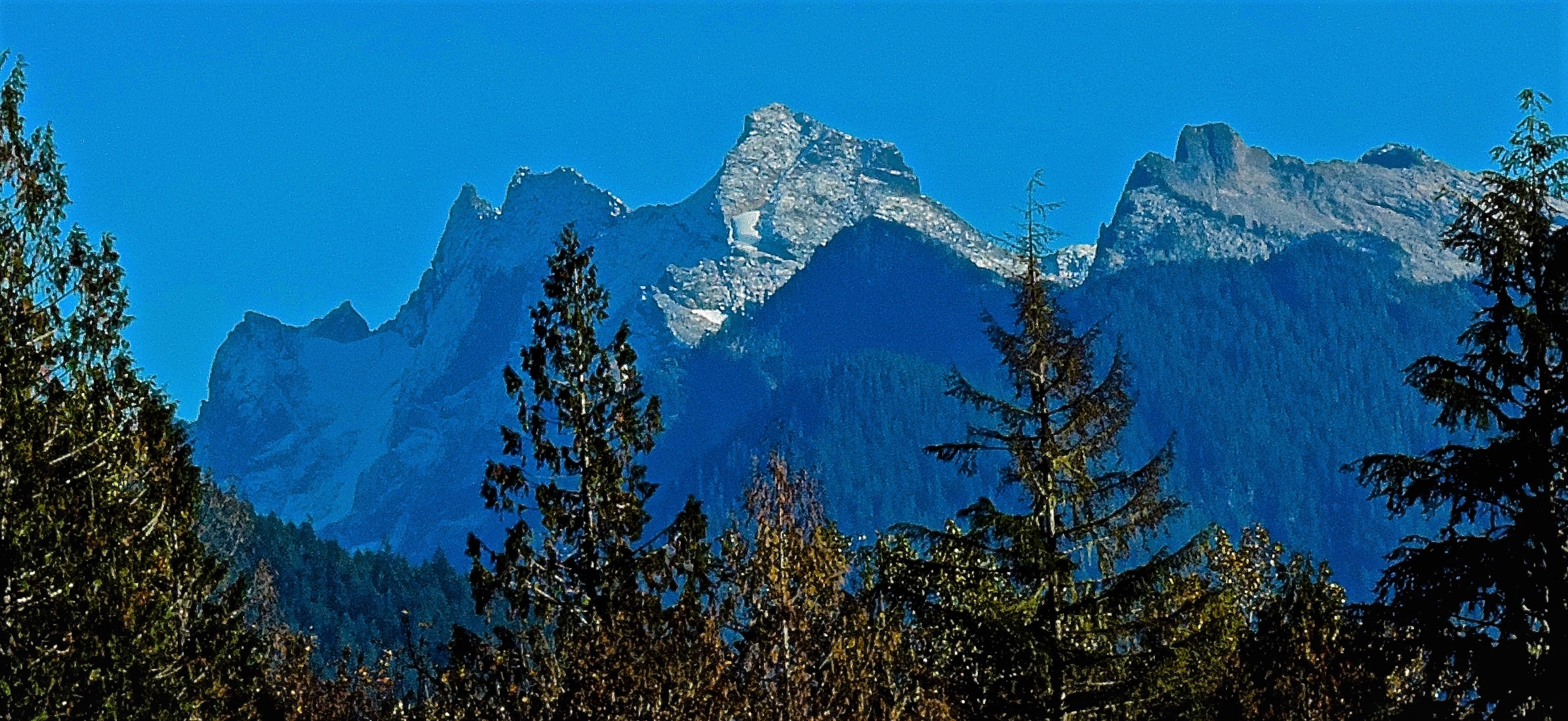
Looking southeast from Highway 20 through the Illabot Creek valley to Chaval

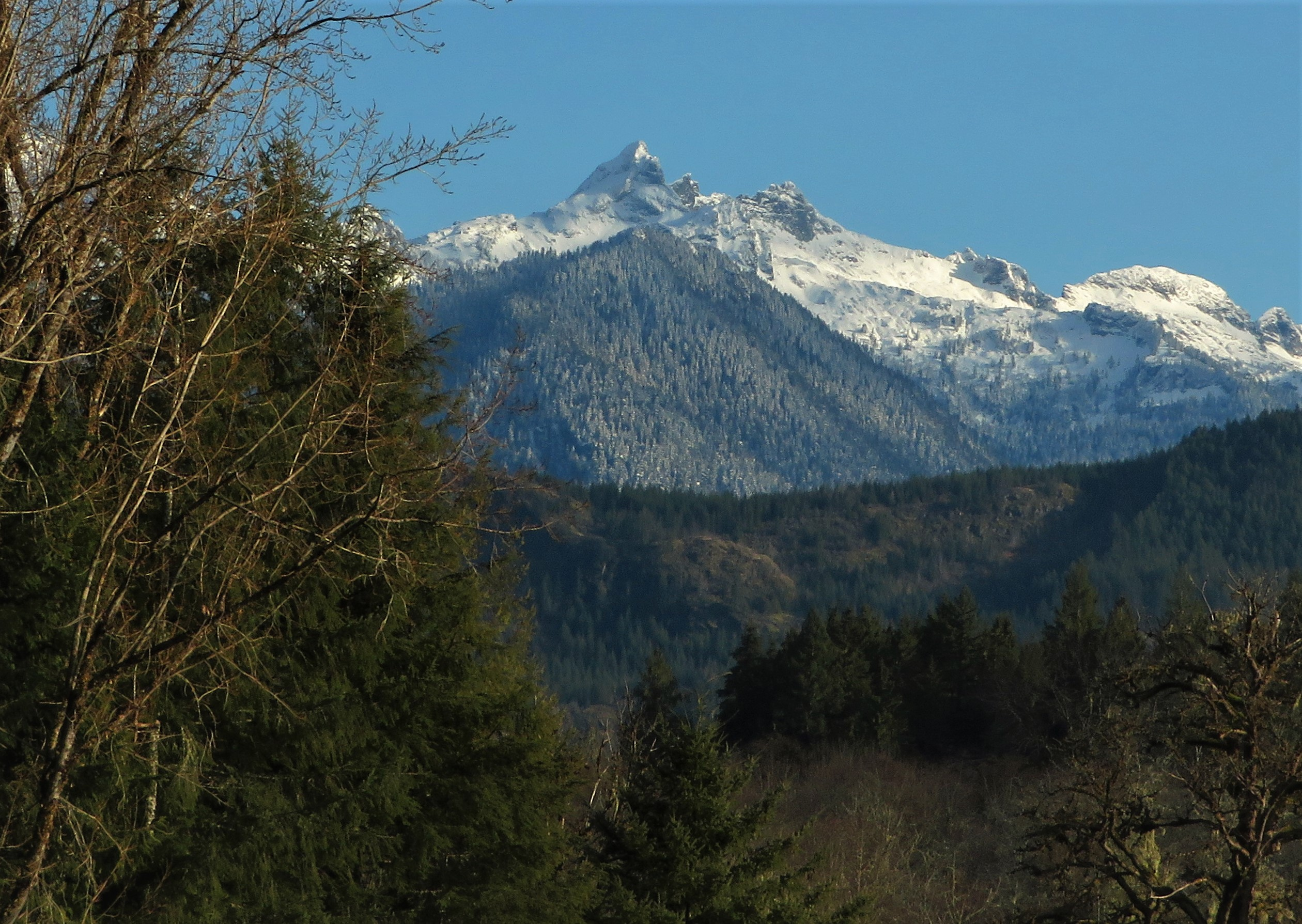
Chaval from Highway 530 north of Darrington

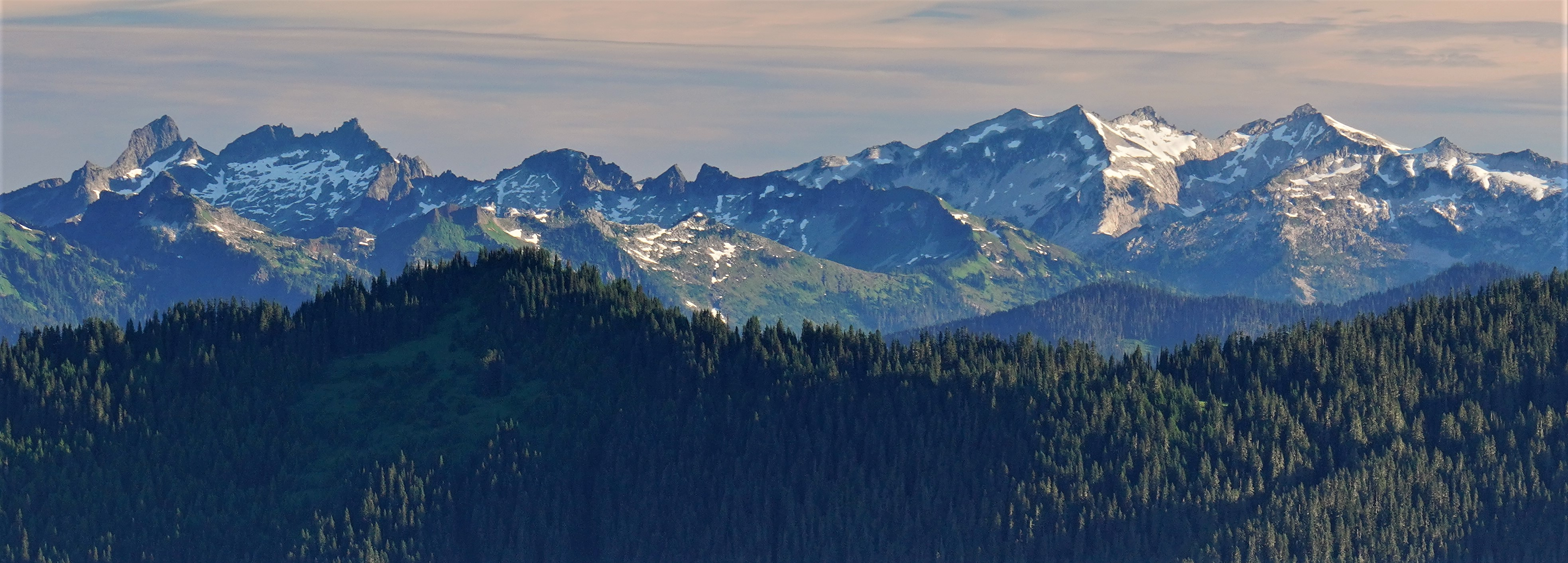
South aspects of Mt. Chaval (left) and Snowking Mountain (right)

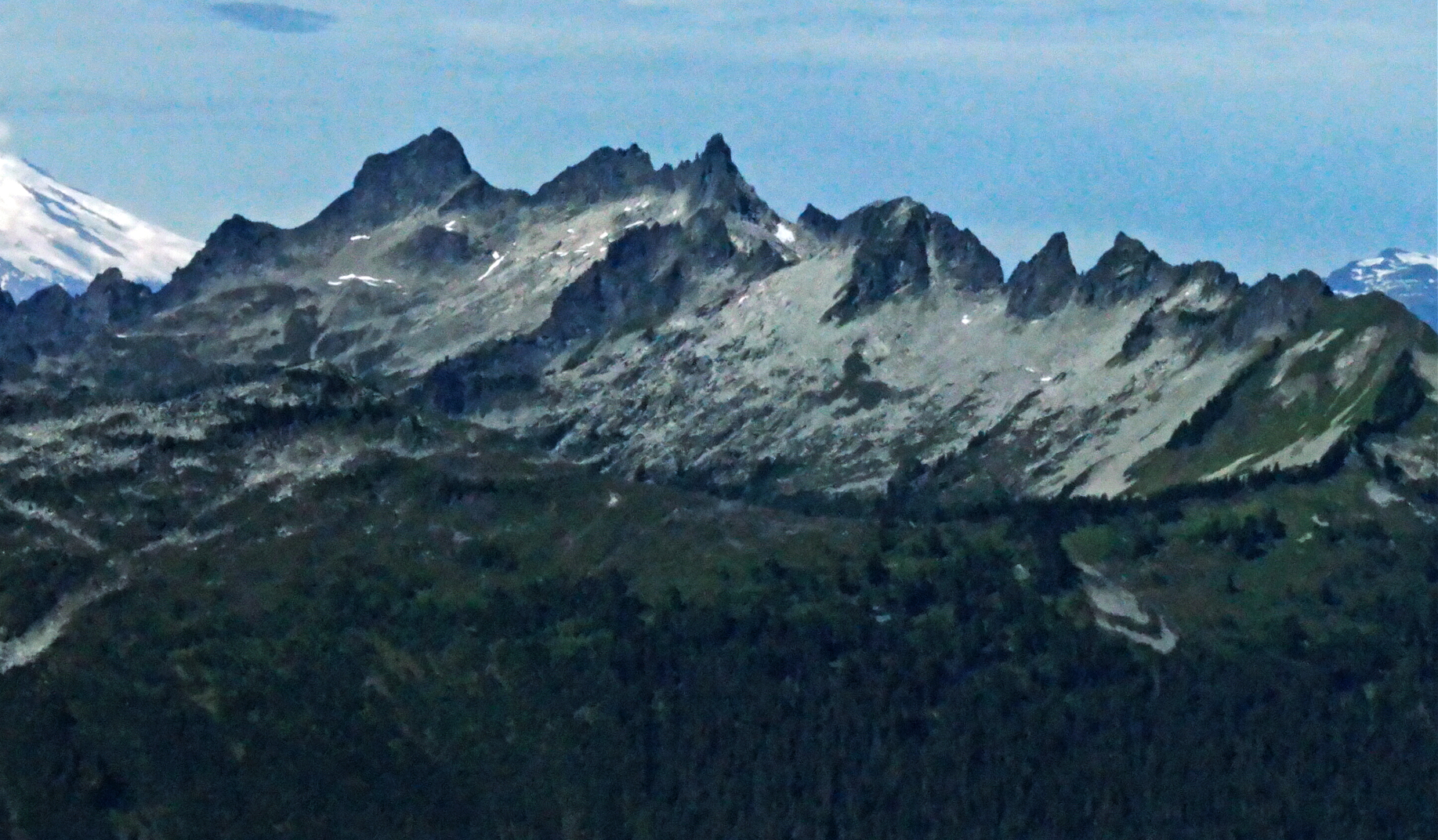
Mt. Chaval from the southeast

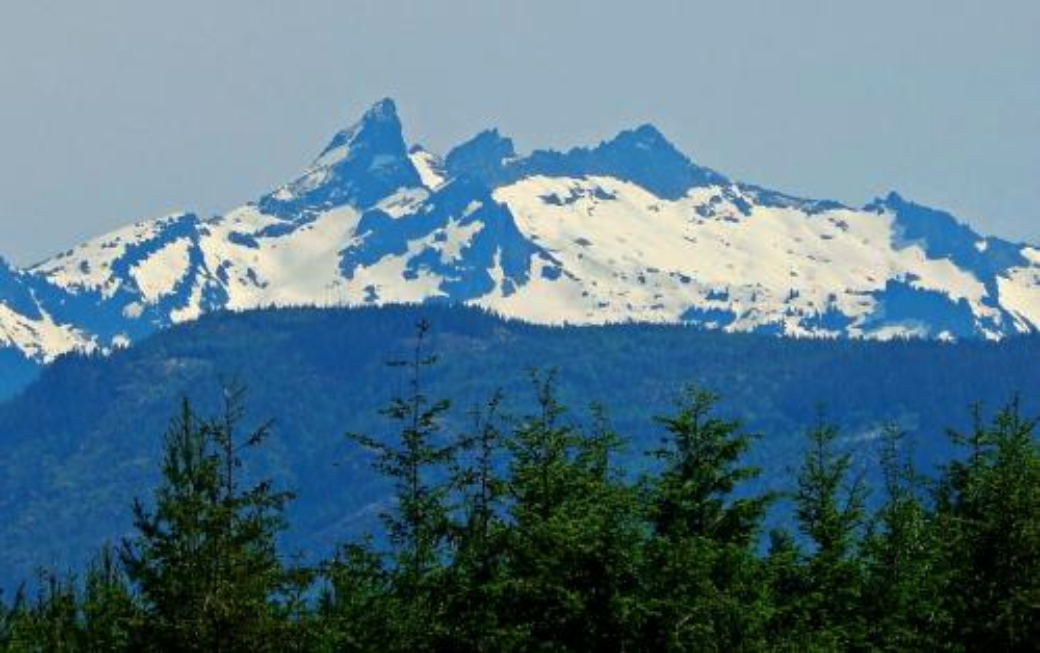
Mount Chaval seen from Darrington

Northeast aspect of Mount Chaval seen from Snowking Mountain

== See also ==
- Geography of Washington (state)
- Geology of the Pacific Northwest
