= Rockport State Park =

Rockport State Park may refer to:

- Rockport State Park (Utah)
- Rockport State Park (Washington)
- Rockport State Recreation Area (Michigan)
