= Hidden Lake (Skagit County, Washington) =

Lake in Skagit County, Washington, United States

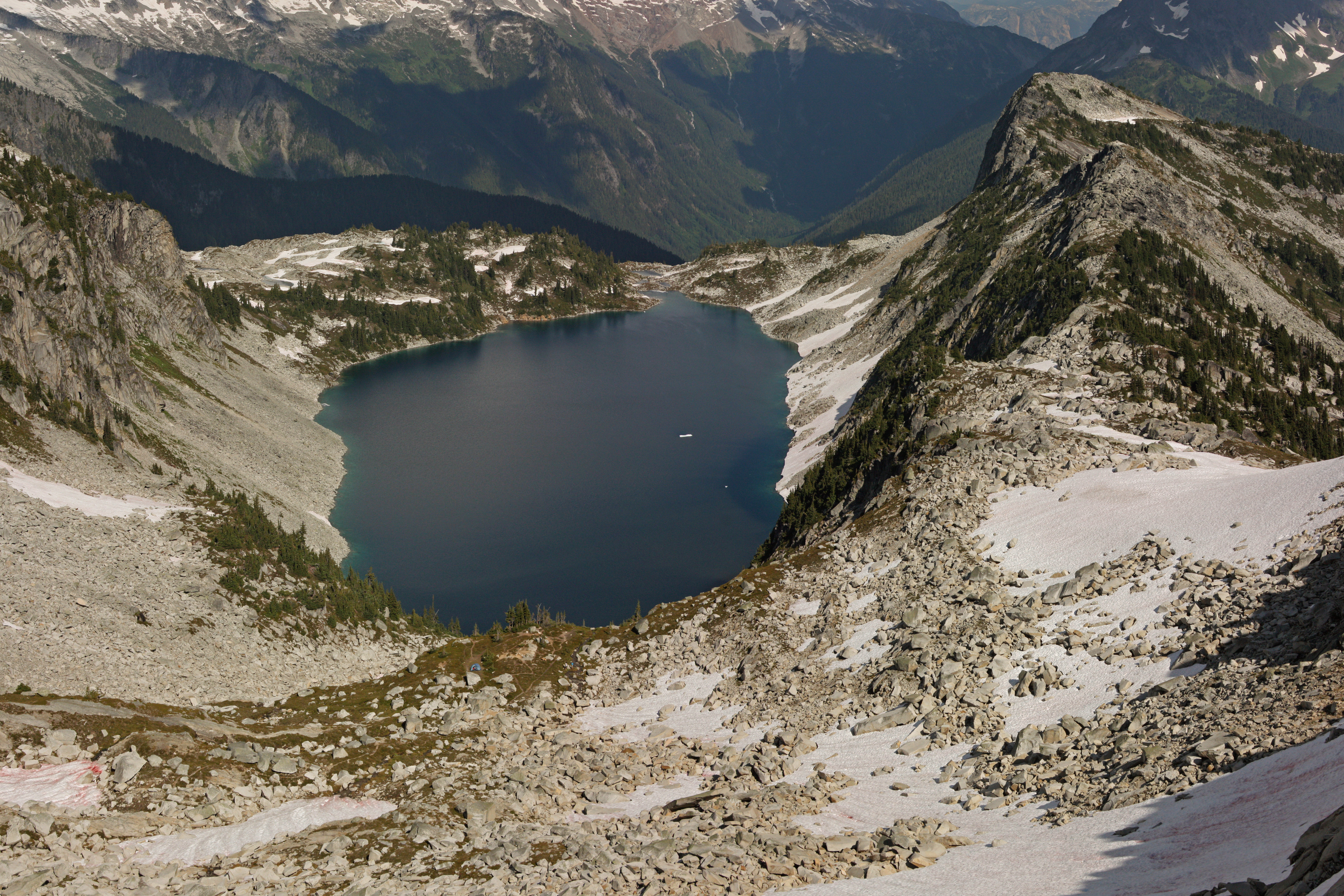
- Hidden Lake from south Hidden Lake Peak

- Location within Washington (state) Location within the United States
- Location: North Cascades National Park, Skagit County, Washington, United States
- Coordinates: 48°29′44″N 121°11′19″W
- Lake type: Alpine
- Primary outflows: Hidden Lake Creek
- Basin countries: United States
- Max. length: .60 mi (0.97 km)
- Max. width: .25 mi (0.40 km)
- Surface elevation: 5,738 ft (1,749 m)

Hidden Lake is located immediately east of Hidden Lake Peaks in North Cascades National Park, in the U. S. state of Washington. Hidden Lake is off designated trails but can reached by way a trailhead off the Cascade River Road from Snoqualmie National Forest. The distance from the trailhead to the lake is 4.5 mi (7.2 km) one way to the overlook and another 0.8 mi (1.3 km) rock scramble through a boulder field to the lakeshore.
