= Hidden Lake Peaks =

Mountain in Washington (state), United States

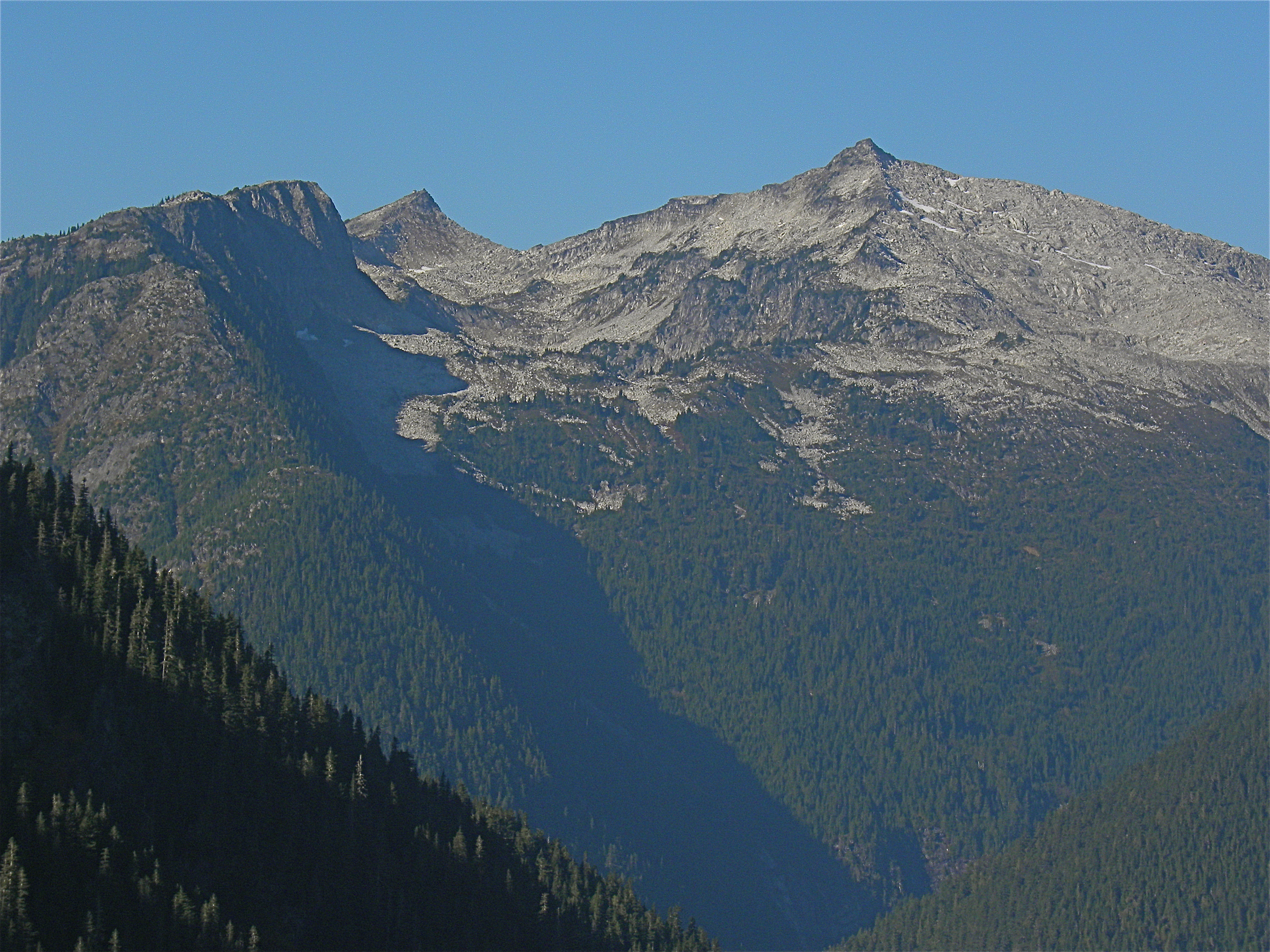
- Hidden Lake Peaks from the east near Cascade Pass

Highest point
- Elevation: 7,088 ft (2,160 m)
- Prominence: 1,008 ft (307 m)
- Parent peak: The Triad
- Isolation: 2.06 mi (3.32 km)
- Coordinates: 48°30′03″N 121°11′51″W

Geography
- Location within Washington (state) Location within the United States
- Interactive map of Hidden Lake Peaks
- Country: United States
- State: Washington
- County: Skagit
- Protected area: North Cascades National Park
- Parent range: North Cascades
- Topo map: USGS Eldorado Peak

Geology
- Rock age: Eocene to Late Cretaceous
- Rock type: Granodioritic Orthogneiss

Climbing
- Easiest route: Hiking trail to lookout Scrambling class 2 to summit

Hidden Lake Peaks is series of peaks with a maximum elevation of 7,088 feet (2,160 meters) that are located in the North Cascades, in Skagit County of Washington state. The peaks extend three miles southwest from the nearest higher peak called The Triad. Situated on the western boundary of North Cascades National Park, Hidden Lake Peaks are positioned west of the crest of the Cascade Range, approximately ten miles east of the town of Marblemount. The popular subsidiary peak, Hidden Lake Lookout (6890 ft), lies a half mile to the southwest of the highest summit. The mountain's name is taken from its proximity to Hidden Lake which lies in a cirque below the east aspect of these two main peaks. Precipitation runoff from Hidden Lake Peaks drains into Cascade River which is a tributary of the Skagit River.

== Climate ==
Hidden Lake Peaks are located in the marine west coast climate zone of western North America. Weather fronts coming off the Pacific Ocean travel northeast toward the Cascade Mountains. As fronts approach the North Cascades, they are forced upward by the peaks of the Cascade Range (orographic lift), causing them to drop their moisture in the form of rain or snowfall onto the Cascades. As a result, the west side of the North Cascades experiences high precipitation, especially during the winter months in the form of snowfall. Because of maritime influence, snow tends to be wet and heavy, resulting in high avalanche danger, particularly on the steep western meadow-covered slopes that are above treeline. During winter months, weather is usually cloudy, but due to high pressure systems over the Pacific Ocean that intensify during summer months, there is often little or no cloud cover during the summer.

== Geology ==
The North Cascades features some of the most rugged topography in the Cascade Range with craggy peaks and ridges, deep glacial valleys, and granite spires.

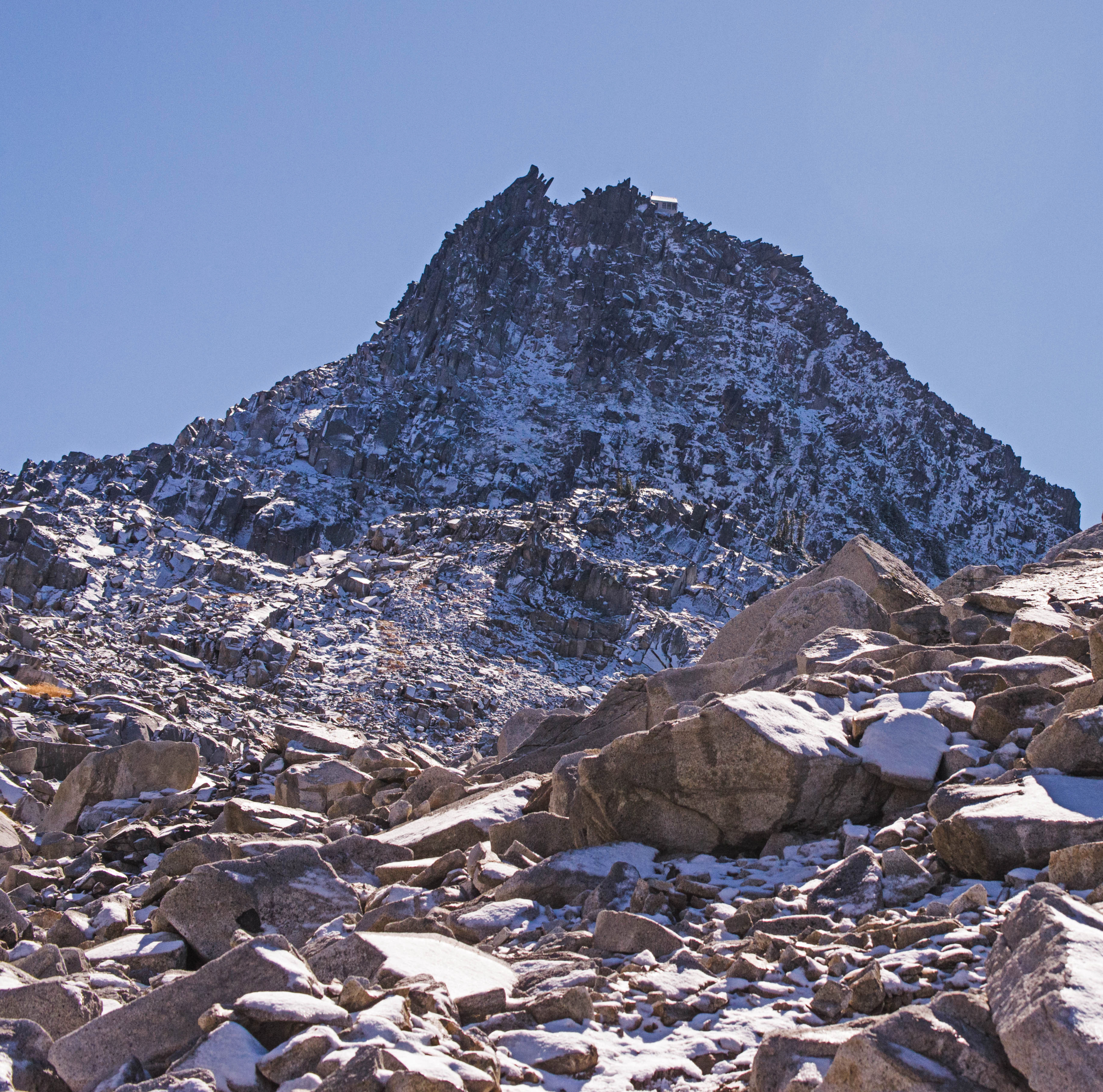
Granitic rock of Hidden Lake Peak

Geological events occurring many years ago created the diverse topography and drastic elevation changes over the Cascade Range leading to various climate differences.

The history of the formation of the Cascade Mountains dates back millions of years ago to the late Eocene Epoch. With the North American Plate overriding the Pacific Plate, episodes of volcanic igneous activity persisted. In addition, small fragments of the oceanic and continental lithosphere called terranes created the North Cascades about 50 million years ago.

During the Pleistocene period dating back over two million years ago, glaciation advancing and retreating repeatedly scoured the landscape leaving deposits of rock debris. The U-shaped cross section of the river valleys is a result of recent glaciation. Uplift and faulting in combination with glaciation have been the dominant processes which have created the tall peaks and deep valleys of the North Cascades area.

== Hidden Lake Peak Lookout ==
The gable roof single-room 14' by 14' lookout was built by the U.S. Forest Service in 1931 and was staffed until 1958, when many fire lookouts in the North Cascades were closed. In 1961 Dr. Fred Darvill and the Skagit Alpine Club obtained a special use permit to restore and maintain the structure. A volunteer group now maintains the lookout, which is open to the public on a first-come-first-serve basis for overnight use. The lookout is generally accessible from July until October, as determined by snow conditions.

=== National Register ===
The Hidden Lake Peak Lookout was added to the National Register of Historic Places on July 14, 1987, and is also on the National Historic Lookout Register.

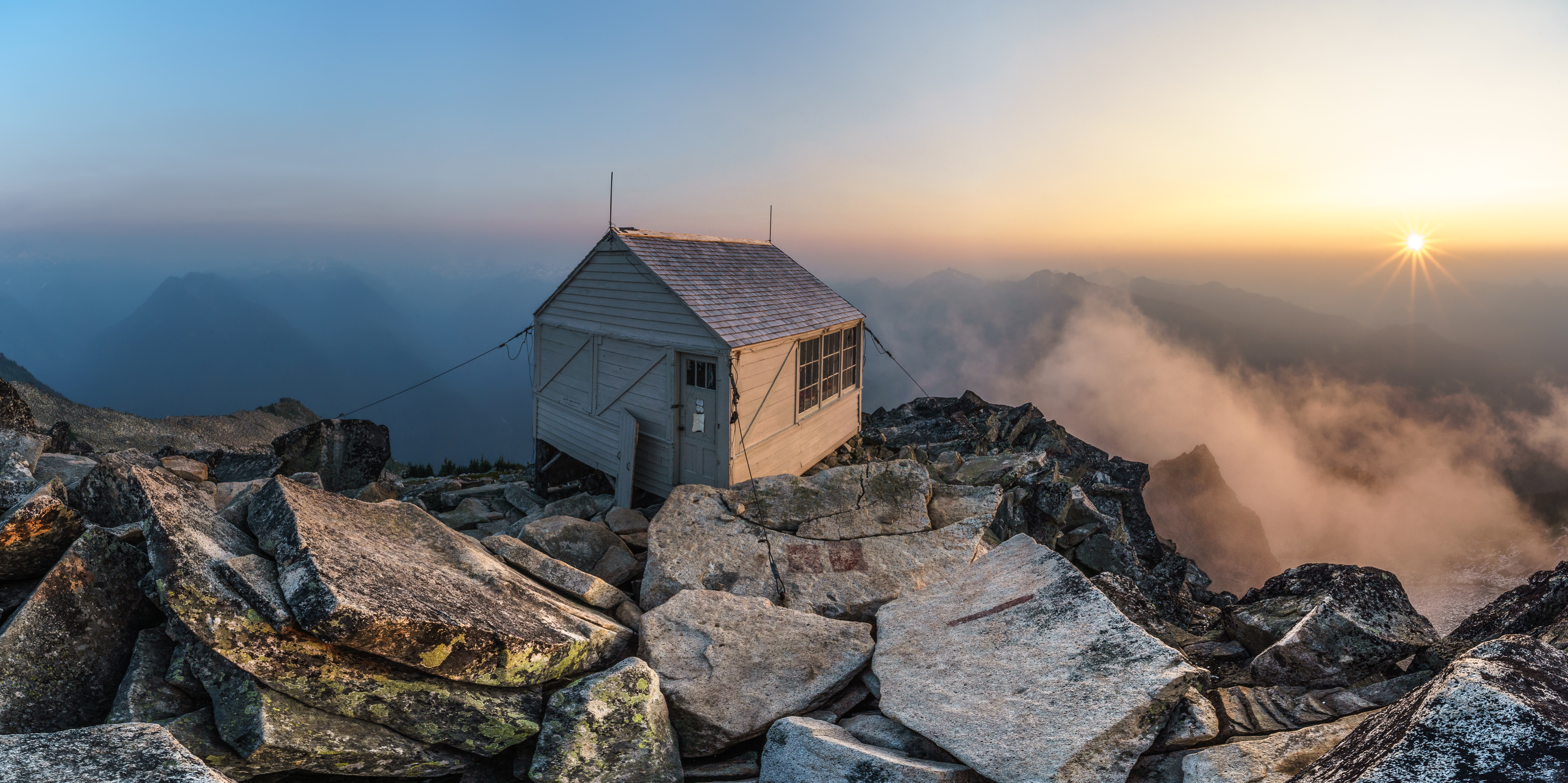
Hidden Lake Peak Fire Lookout

Structure - ID #87001184
North Cascades National Park overlooking the Cascade Pass area
Historic Significance: Event, Architecture/Engineering
Area of Significance: Architecture, Conservation, Politics/Government
Period of Significance: 1931-1958
Owner: Federal
Historic Function: Government
Historic Sub-function: Fire Station
Current Function: Government
Current Sub-function: Fire Station
North Cascades National Park 10 miles (16 km) east of Marblemount, Washington
Elevation 6,890 feet (2,100 m)

== Access ==
The trailhead for Hidden Lake Trail #745 to the top of Hidden Lake Peak Lookout is located at the end of five mile long Forest Service Road #1540, which junctions 9.5 miles up the Cascade River Road from Marblemount. The steep 4.5 miles (7.2 km) trail, with a 2,900-foot (880 m) elevation gain, starts in forest then transitions to wonderful wildflower filled meadows before climbing high into heather and rock gardens. The summit provides views of the peaks of the Ptarmigan Traverse, the stratovolcanoes Glacier Peak and Mount Baker, and other giants such as Forbidden Peak, Eldorado Peak, and Snowking Mountain.

== Gallery ==
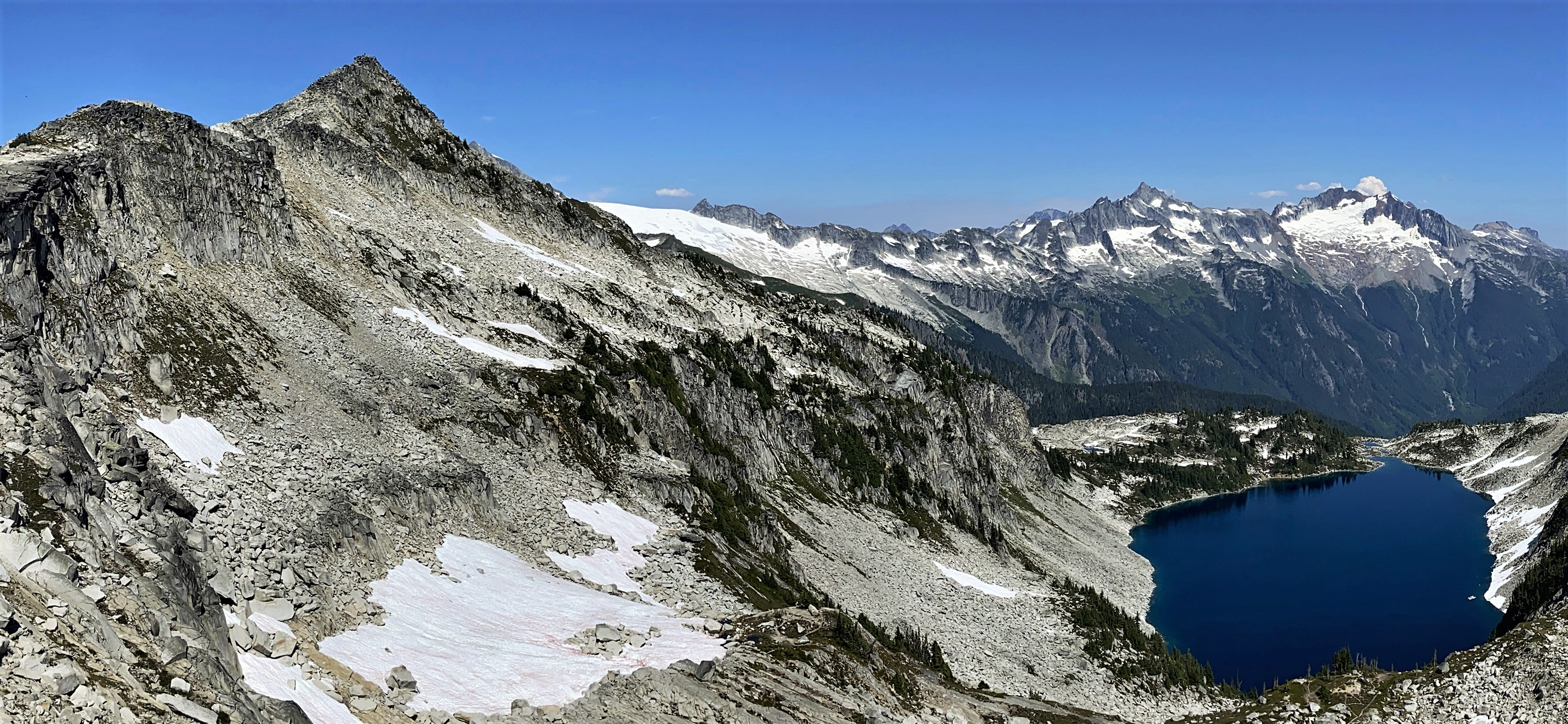
Hidden Lake Peak and Hidden Lake

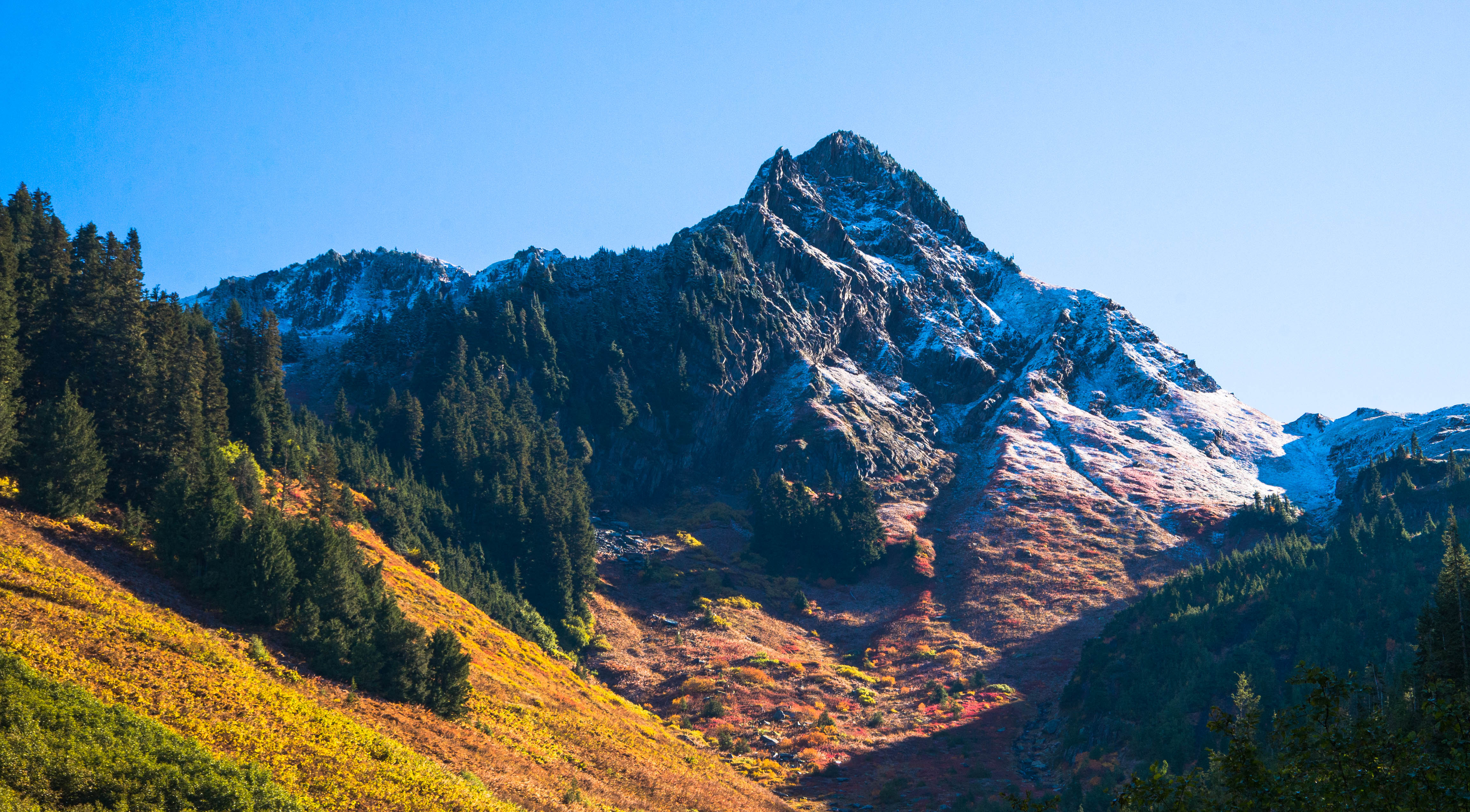
One of the northern Hidden Lake Peaks

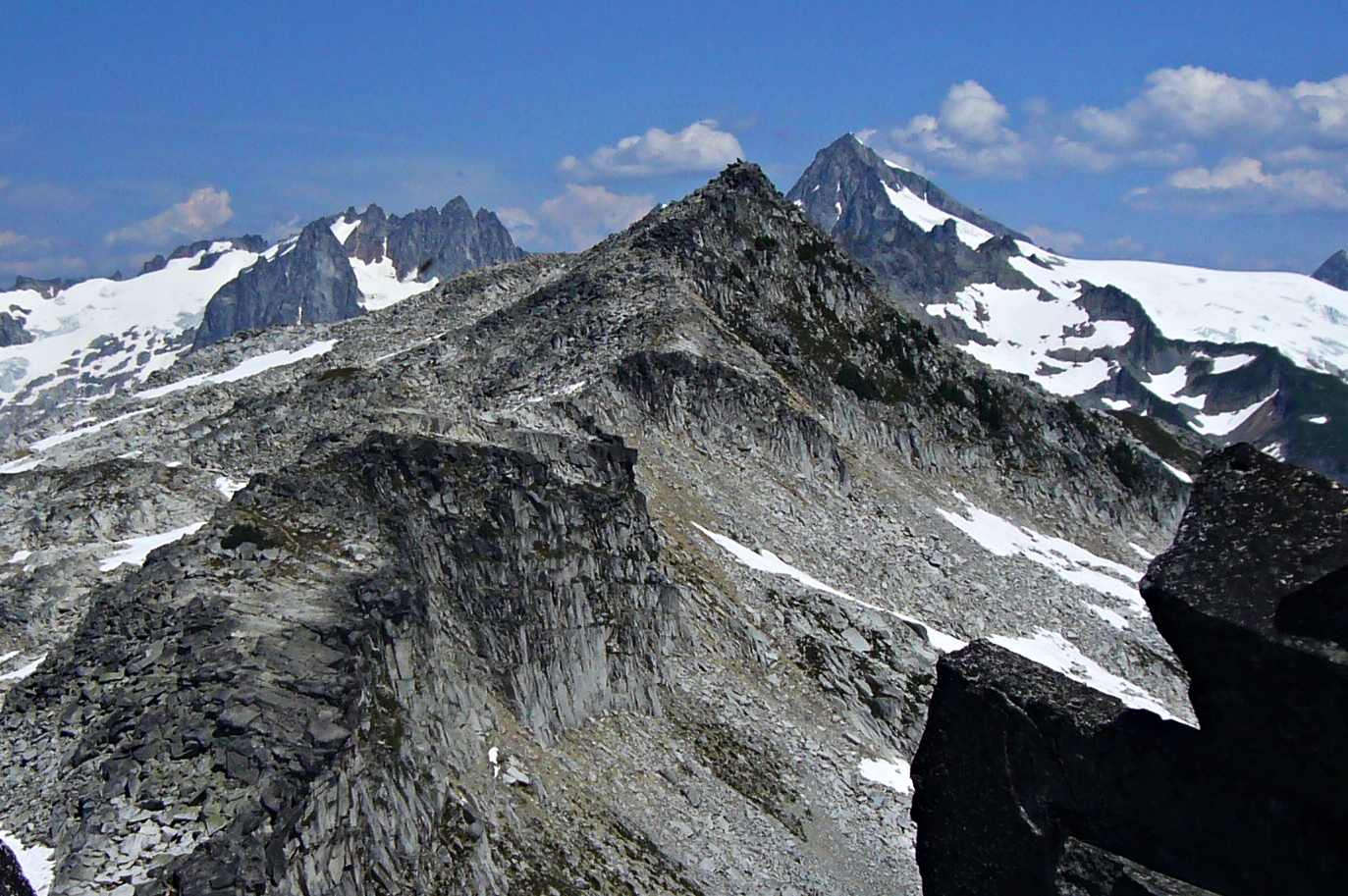
The highest of the Hidden Lake Peaks seen from the lookout with Dorado Needle (left) and Eldorado Peak (right)

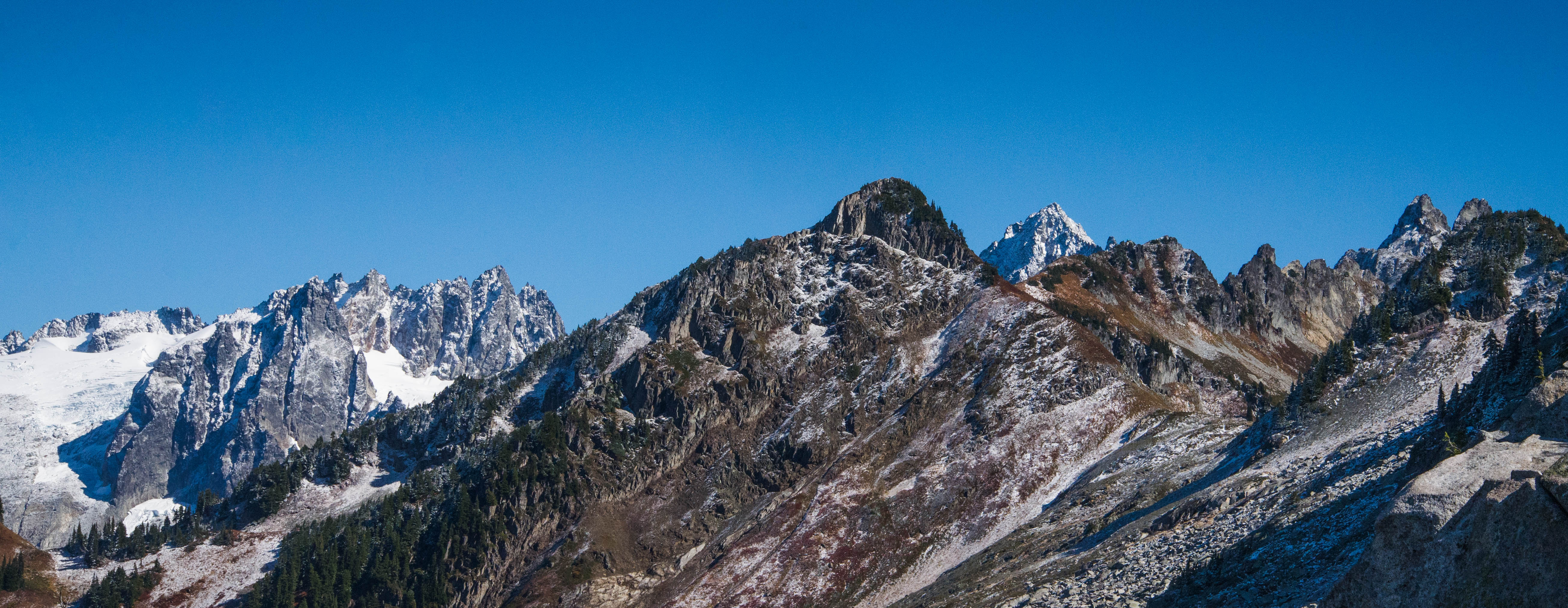
Hidden Lake Peaks with Early Morning Spire and Dorado Needle (left)

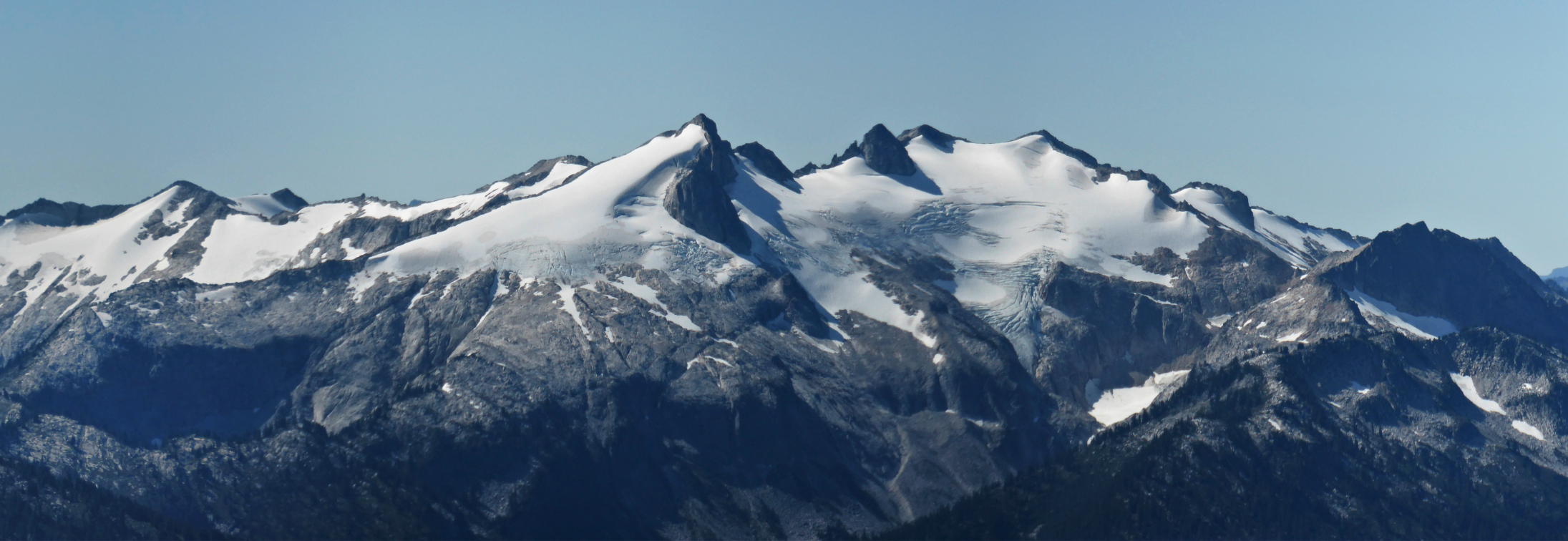
Snowking Mountain seen from Hidden Lake Peak

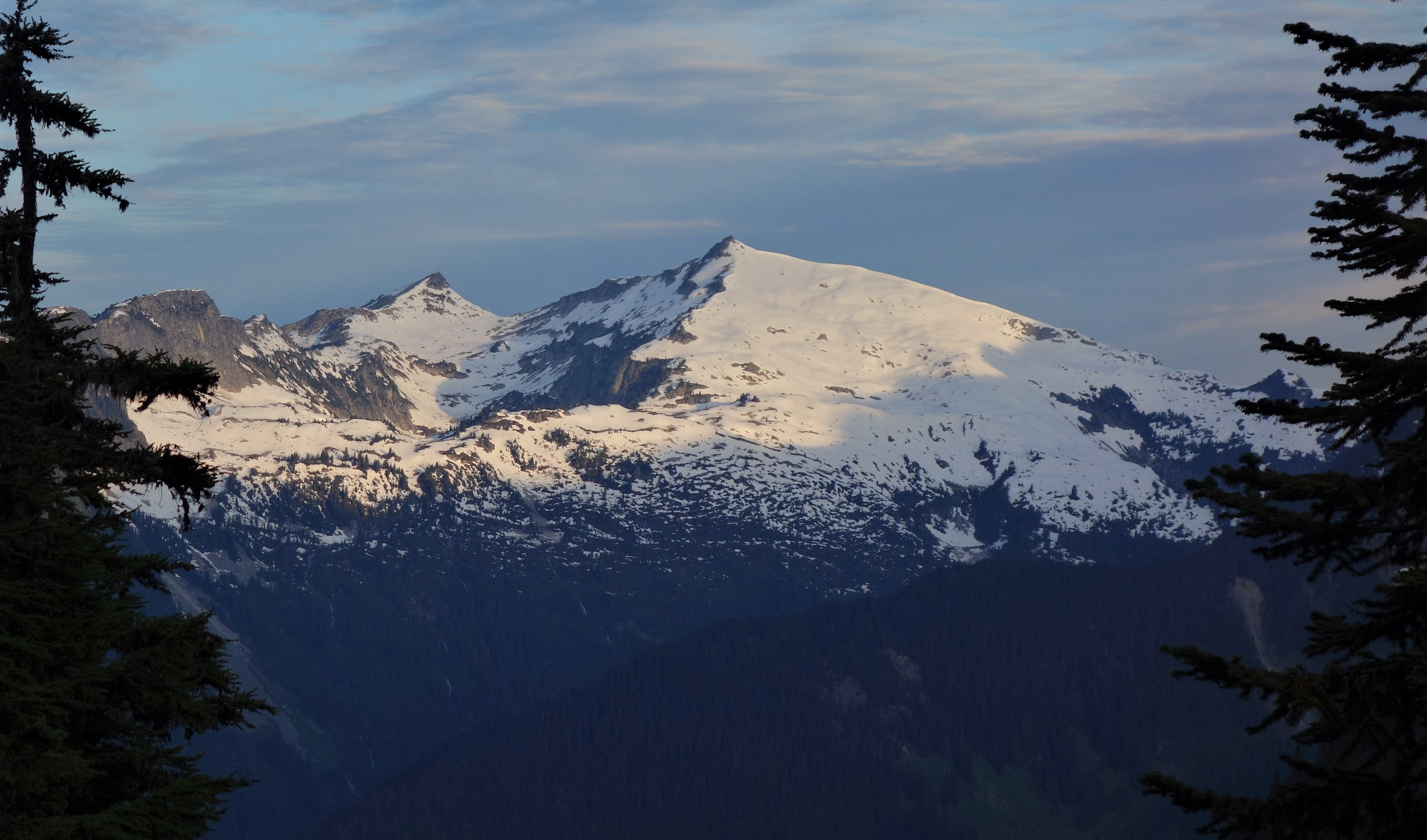
Hidden Lake Peaks, east aspect

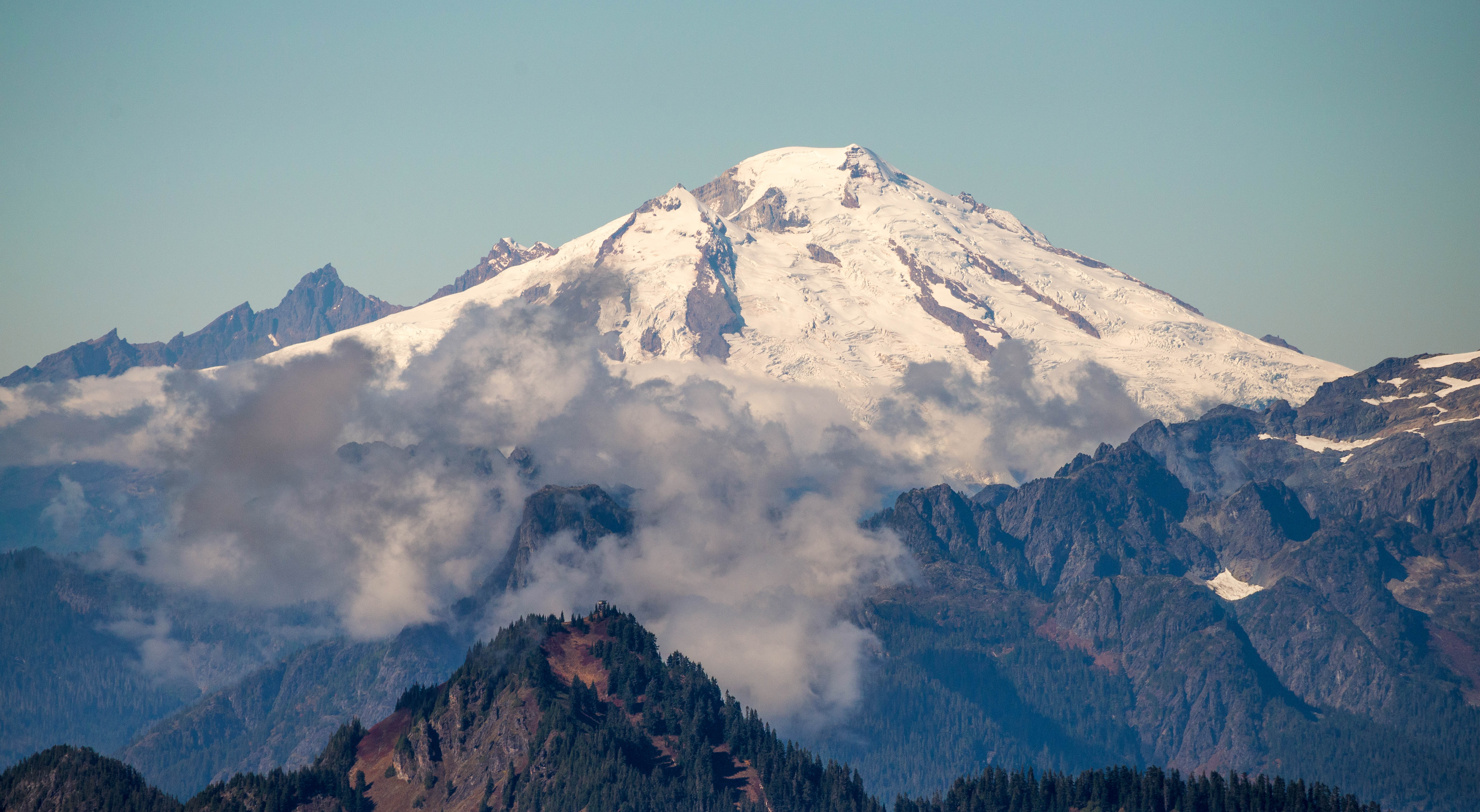
Mt. Baker seen from Hidden Lake Peaks

== See also ==
- Geography of the North Cascades
- Geology of the Pacific Northwest
