= Sauk Mountain =

Mountain Summit, Skagit County of Washington State

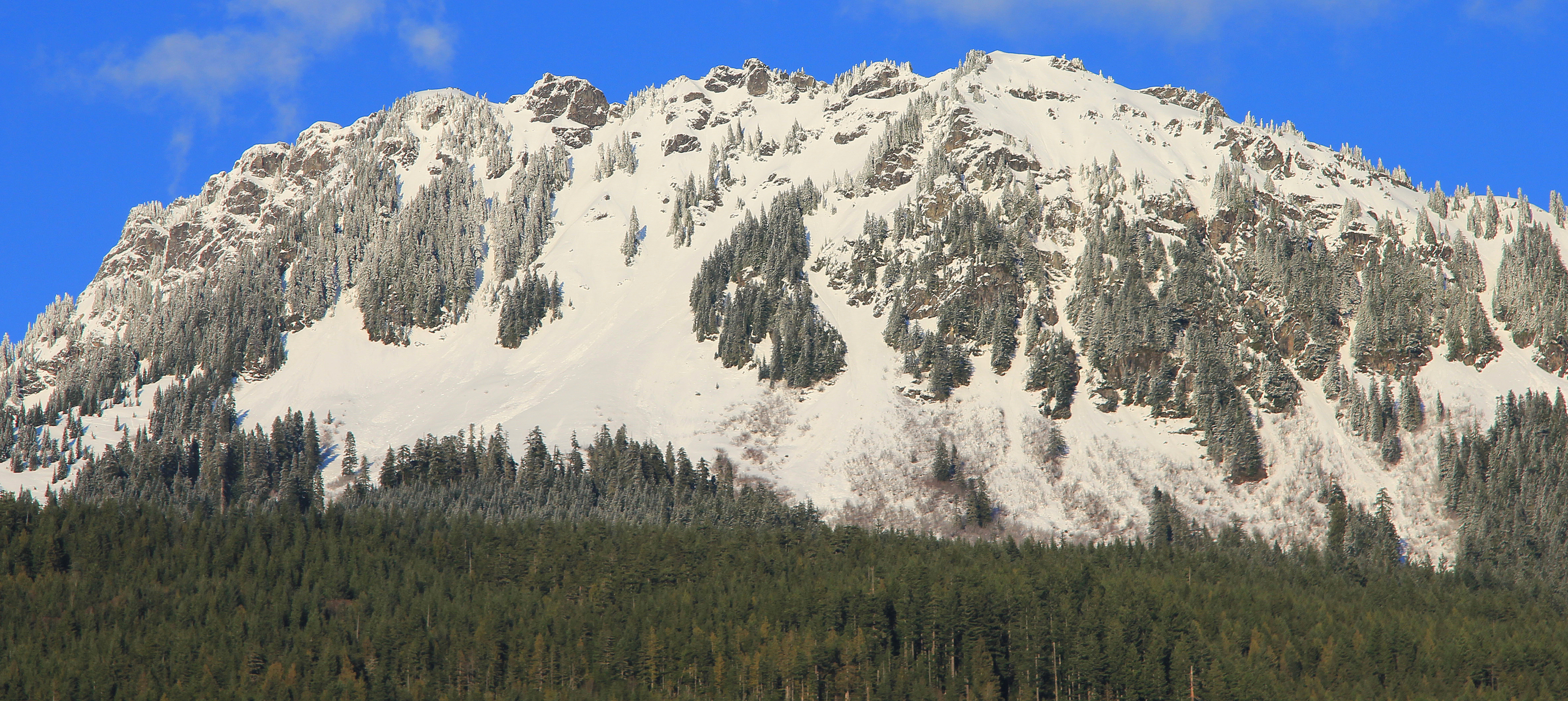
- Sauk Mountain, west aspect

Highest point
- Elevation: 5,545 ft (1,690 m)
- Prominence: 1,621 ft (494 m)
- Parent peak: Mount Watson
- Isolation: 8.06 mi (12.97 km)
- Coordinates: 48°31′23″N 121°36′04″W

Naming
- Native name: dxʷgʷiʔt (Lushootseed)

Geography
- Location within Washington (state) Location within the United States
- Interactive map of Sauk Mountain
- Country: United States
- State: Washington
- County: Skagit
- Parent range: North Cascades
- Topo map: USGS Sauk Mountain

Geology
- Rock type: Greenschist

Climbing
- First ascent: 1895 by G. O. Smith
- Easiest route: Sauk Mountain Trail and scrambling

Sauk Mountain is a 5,545-foot (1,690-metre) mountain summit located in Skagit County of Washington state. It is situated immediately north of Rockport State Park and the North Cascades Highway, on land managed by the Mount Baker-Snoqualmie National Forest. Part of the North Cascades, Sauk Mountain is positioned west of the crest of the Cascade Range, approximately nine miles east of Concrete, Washington, and 17 miles north of the town of Darrington. The nearest higher peak is Helen Buttes, 5.86 miles (9.43 km) to the northeast. A popular two-mile trail provides hikers with good views from the craggy summit of Mount Baker, Mount Shuksan, Mount Chaval, and the Picket Range. Precipitation runoff from Sauk Mountain drains into tributaries of the Skagit River.

The mountain's name, "Sauk" comes from its position immediately north of the confluence of the Sauk River with the Skagit River, which in turn comes from the Sauk people, a people indigenous to the Sauk River area. The name for the mountain in their language, Lushootseed, is dxʷgʷiʔt.

== Climate ==
Sauk Mountain is located in the marine west coast climate zone of western North America. Most weather fronts coming off the Pacific Ocean move northeast toward the Cascade Mountains. As fronts approach the North Cascades, they are forced upward by the peaks of the Cascade Range (orographic lift), causing them to drop their moisture in the form of rain or snowfall onto the Cascades. As a result, the west side of the North Cascades experiences high precipitation, especially during the winter months in the form of snowfall. Because of maritime influence, snow tends to be wet and heavy, resulting in high avalanche danger. During winter months, weather is usually cloudy, but, due to high pressure systems over the Pacific Ocean that intensify during summer months, there is often little or no cloud cover during the summer

== Geology ==
The North Cascades features some of the most rugged topography in the Cascade Range with craggy peaks and ridges, deep glacial valleys, and granite spires. Geological events occurring many years ago created the diverse topography and drastic elevation changes over the Cascade Range leading to the various climate differences.

The history of the formation of the Cascade Mountains dates back millions of years ago to the late Eocene Epoch. With the North American Plate overriding the Pacific Plate, episodes of volcanic igneous activity persisted. In addition, small fragments of the oceanic and continental lithosphere called terranes created the North Cascades about 50 million years ago.

During the Pleistocene period dating back over two million years ago, glaciation advancing and retreating repeatedly scoured the landscape leaving deposits of rock debris. The U-shaped cross section of the river valleys is a result of recent glaciation. Uplift and faulting in combination with glaciation have been the dominant processes which have created the tall peaks and deep valleys of the North Cascades area.

== Gallery ==
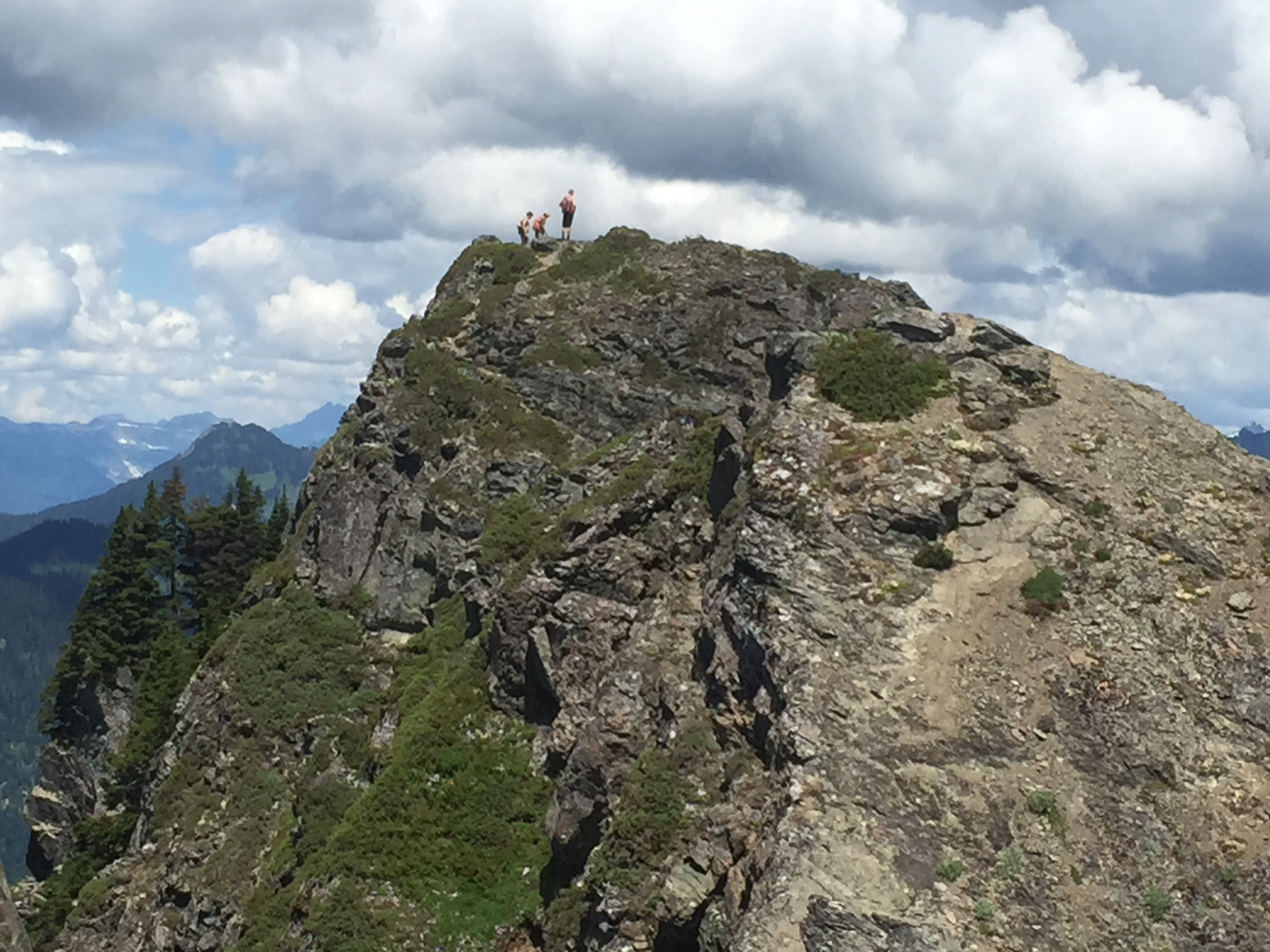
One of Sauk's summits

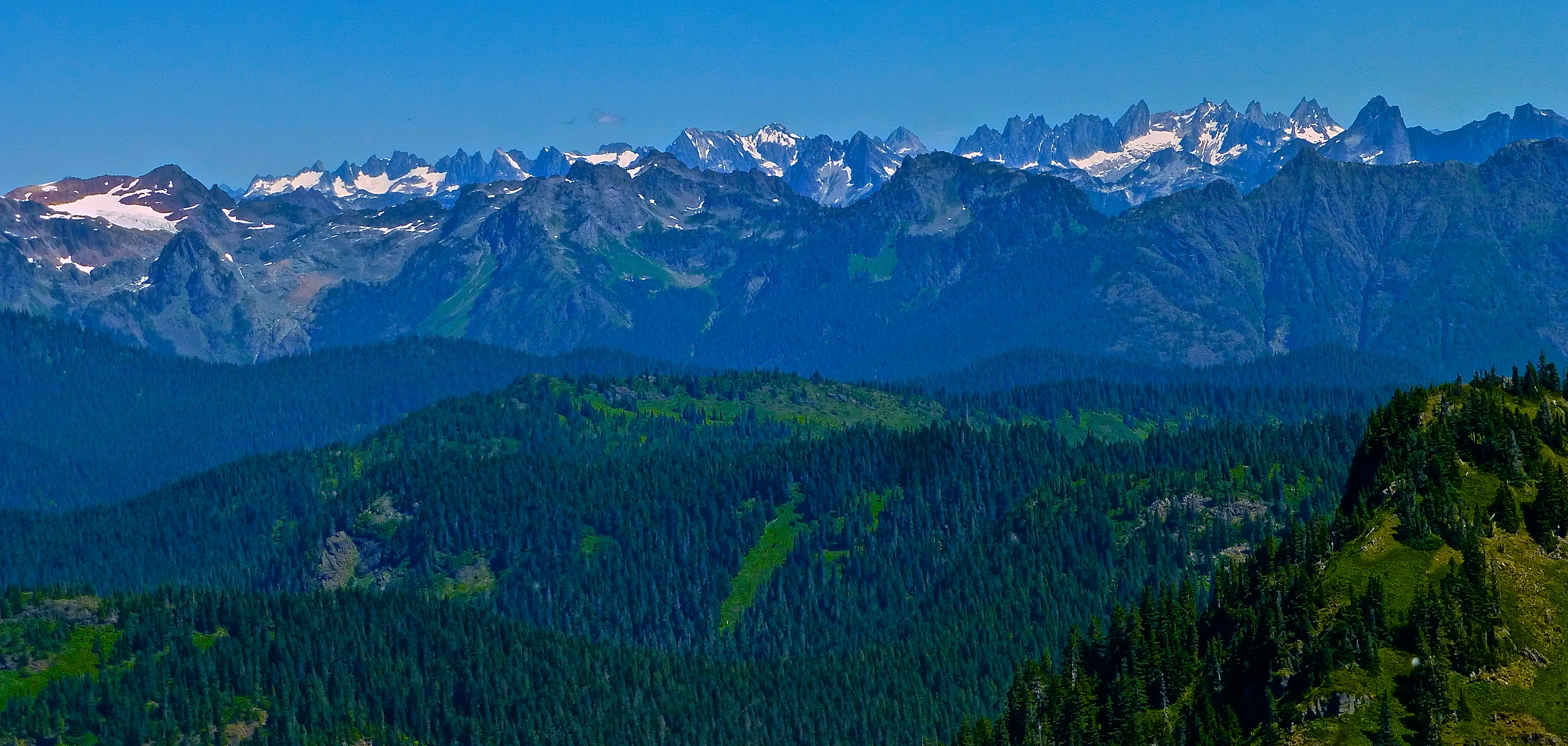
Sauk's view of Picket Range

== See also ==
- Geography of Washington (state)
- Geology of the Pacific Northwest
