= Rockport State Park (Washington) =

State park in the U.S. state of Washington

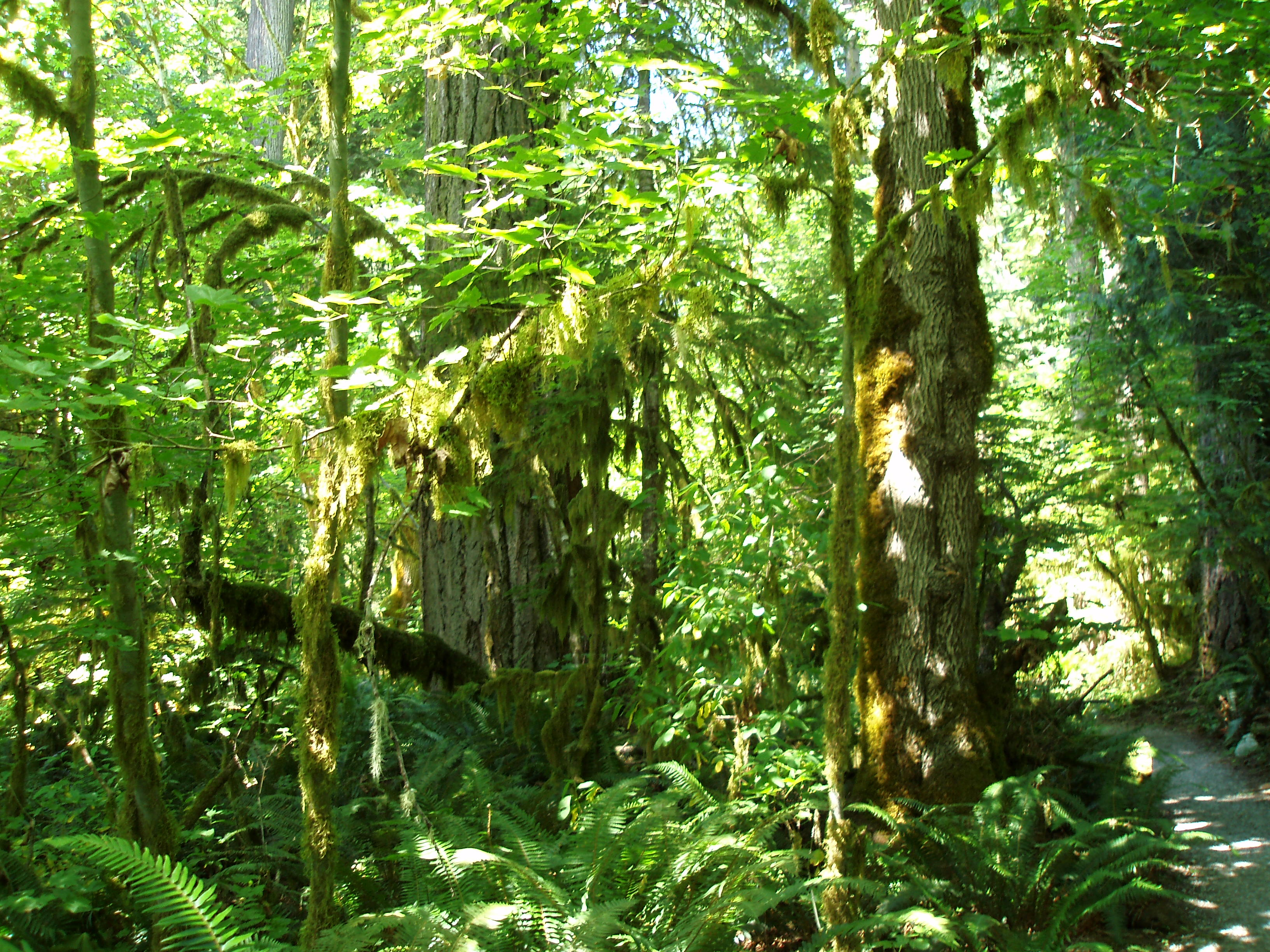

- Location within Washington (state) Location within the United States
- Location: Skagit County, Washington, United States
- Coordinates: 48°29′31″N 121°36′26″W
- Area: 632 acres (256 ha)
- Elevation: 469 ft (143 m)
- Established: 1961
- Administrator: Washington State Parks and Recreation Commission
- Visitors: 58,663 (in 2024)
- Website: Rockport State Park

Rockport State Park is a 632-acre (256 ha) public recreation area at the foot of Sauk Mountain in Skagit County, Washington. The state park is notable for its nearly 600 acres (240 ha) of old-growth forest. The park offers five miles of hiking trails including the Sauk Mountain Trail and the Evergreen Trail which traverses the old-growth forest.

== Climate ==
The park is located in the marine west coast climate zone of western North America. Most weather fronts originate in the Pacific Ocean, and travel northeast toward the Cascade Mountains. As fronts approach, they are forced upward by the peaks of the Cascade Range (Orographic lift), causing them to drop their moisture in the form of rain or snowfall onto the Cascades. As a result, the west side of the North Cascades experiences high precipitation, especially during the winter months in the form of snowfall. During winter months, weather is usually cloudy, but, due to high pressure systems over the Pacific Ocean that intensify during summer months, there is often little or no cloud cover during the summer.
