= Snowking Mountain =

Mountain in Washington (state), United States

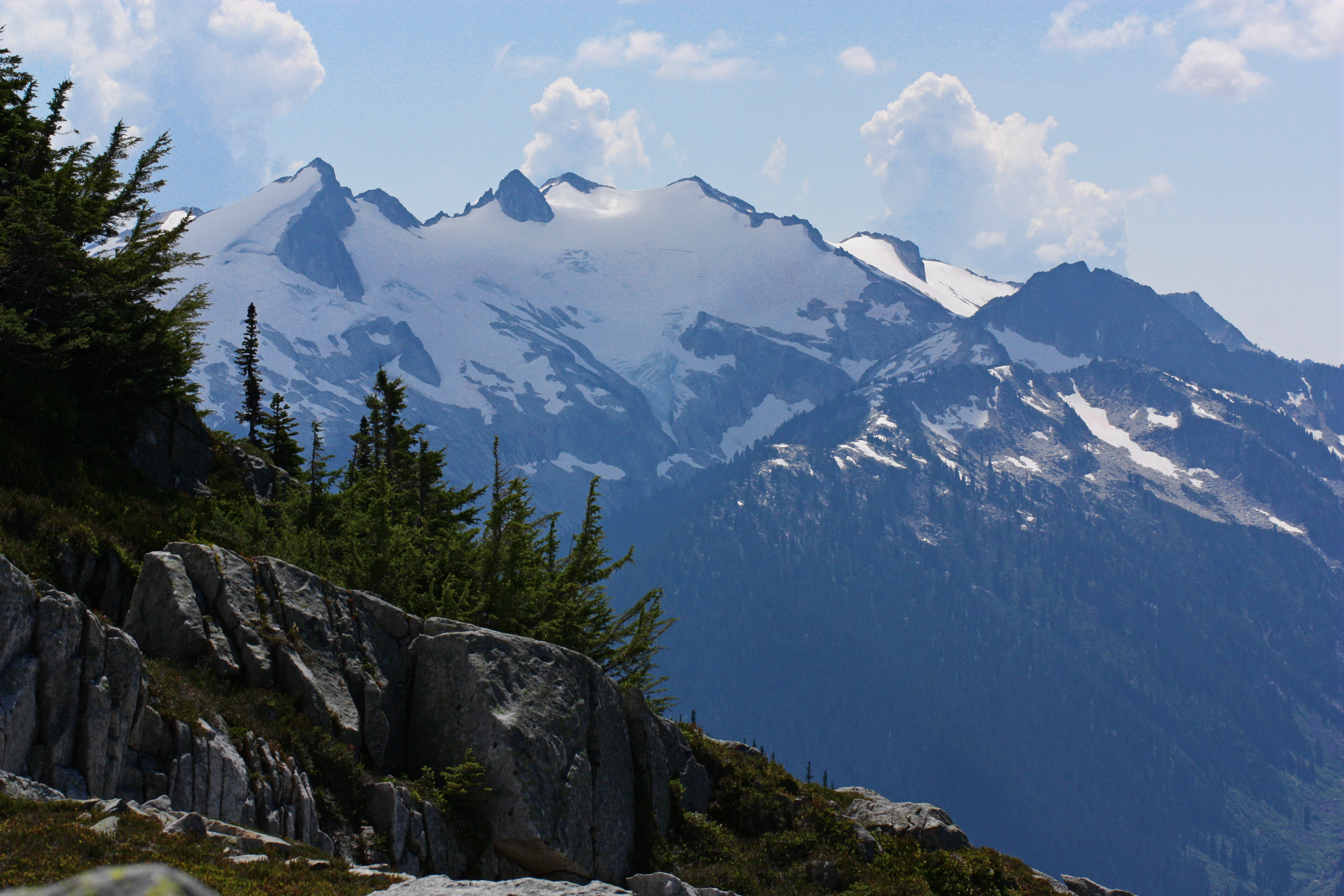
- Snowking Mountain showing north aspect

Highest point
- Elevation: 7,433 ft (2,266 m)
- Prominence: 1,593 ft (486 m)
- Parent peak: Mount Misch
- Isolation: 5.74 mi (9.24 km)
- Coordinates: 48°24′30″N 121°16′42″W

Geography
- Location within Washington (state) Location within the United States
- Interactive map of Snowking Mountain
- Country: United States
- State: Washington
- County: Skagit
- Protected area: Glacier Peak Wilderness
- Parent range: North Cascades
- Topo map: USGS Snowking Mountain

Climbing
- Easiest route: Alpine Scrambling

Snowking Mountain is a 7,433-foot (2,266-metre) summit located in Skagit County of Washington state. Situated within the Glacier Peak Wilderness, Snowking Mountain is positioned west of the crest of the North Cascades, approximately 18 miles northeast of the town of Darrington. It is set within the Glacier Peak Wilderness, on land managed by Mount Baker–Snoqualmie National Forest. Snowking has two subsidiary peaks, West Peak (7,425 ft), and Middle Peak (7,400 ft). A broad unnamed glacier known colloquially as Snowking Glacier rests on the north face. Downslope of that glacier are Snowking Lake, Found Lake, and Cyclone Lake. Mount Tommy Thompson is three miles to the northwest, and the nearest higher neighbor is Mount Misch, 5.75 miles (9.25 km) to the southeast. Precipitation runoff from Snowking Mountain drains into tributaries of the Skagit River.

== Climate ==
Snowking Mountain is located in the marine west coast climate zone of western North America. Most weather fronts coming off the Pacific Ocean travel northeast toward the Cascade Mountains. As fronts approach the North Cascades, they are forced upward by the peaks of the Cascade Range (orographic lift), causing them to drop their moisture in the form of rain or snowfall onto the Cascades. As a result, the west side of the North Cascades experiences high precipitation, especially during the winter months in the form of snowfall. Because of maritime influence, snow tends to be wet and heavy, resulting in high avalanche danger. During winter months, weather is usually cloudy, but, due to high pressure systems over the Pacific Ocean that intensify during summer months, there is often little or no cloud cover during the summer.

== Geology ==
The North Cascades features some of the most rugged topography in the Cascade Range with craggy peaks and ridges, deep glacial valleys, and granite spires. Geological events occurring many years ago created the diverse topography and drastic elevation changes over the Cascade Range leading to the various climate differences.

The history of the formation of the Cascade Mountains dates back millions of years ago to the late Eocene Epoch. With the North American Plate overriding the Pacific Plate, episodes of volcanic igneous activity persisted. In addition, small fragments of the oceanic and continental lithosphere called terranes created the North Cascades about 50 million years ago.

During the Pleistocene period dating back over two million years ago, glaciation advancing and retreating repeatedly scoured the landscape leaving deposits of rock debris. The U-shaped cross section of the river valleys is a result of recent glaciation. Uplift and faulting in combination with glaciation have been the dominant processes which have created the tall peaks and deep valleys of the North Cascades area.

== Gallery ==
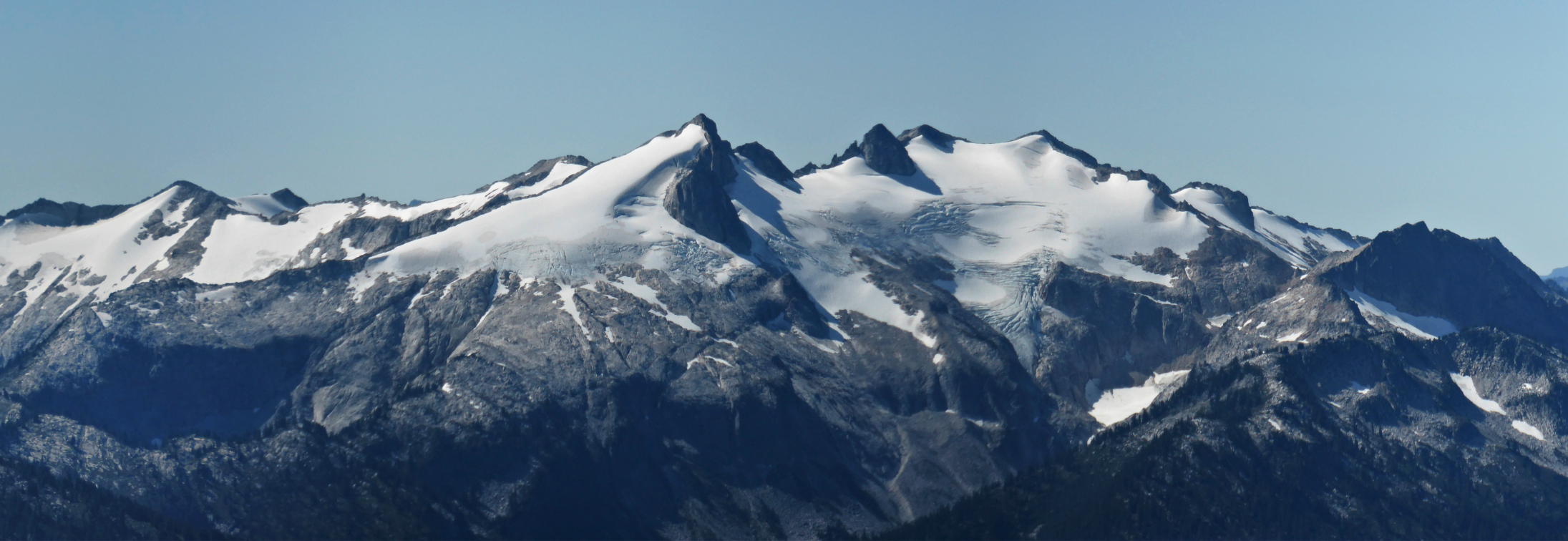
Snowking Mountain seen from Hidden Lake Peaks

Panorama from Snowking Mountain
