= Sheffield Pike =

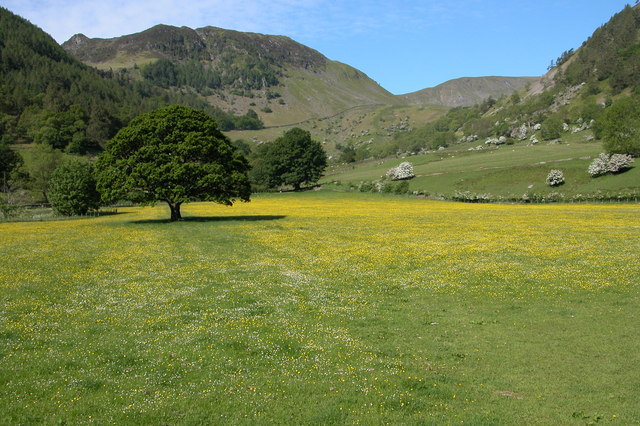
- Sheffield Pike seen from Glencoyne

Highest point
- Elevation: 675 m (2,215 ft)
- Prominence: 91 m (299 ft)
- Parent peak: Great Dodd
- Listing: Hewitt, Nuttall, Wainwright
- Coordinates: 54°33′18″N 2°58′43″W

Geography
- Location within the Lake District
- Location: Cumbria, England
- Parent range: Lake District, Eastern Fells
- OS grid: NY368182
- Topo map: OS Explorer OL5

Sheffield Pike (possibly meaning "the peak above the sheep fold") is a fell in the English Lake District, a prominent intermediate top on one of the eastern ridges of Stybarrow Dodd. It separates and stands high above the Glencoyne and Glenridding valleys, on the eastern side of the Helvellyn range in the Eastern Fells and it looks down onto Ullswater.

== Topography ==
A broad ridge runs east from the summit of Stybarrow Dodd, across a grassy saddle to the subsidiary top of White Stones, the summit of Green Side (795 m / 2,608 ft), where it turn to the north-east to Hart Side and Watermillock Common. The south-east shoulder of Green Side drops about 200 m (660 ft) down a slope which has been quarried and damaged by mining activities beneath to the depression of Nick Head (584 m / 1,916 ft). From here the ridge rises 91 m (299 ft) to the top of Sheffield Pike (675 m / 2,215 ft).

Two lower ridges descend to the east of Sheffield Pike. The south-east shoulder, below Heron Pike, drops to a grassy col and then rises to Glenridding Dodd, the final top on the ridge before Ullswater. The north-east shoulder drops through Glencoyne Wood and past Moss Crag to Ullswater. The secluded little valley of Mossdale lies between these two lower ridges.

Broadly oval in plan, Sheffield Pike separates the Glencoyne and Glenridding valleys, rising high above both. Each flank is steep, the Glenridding Screes on the south side particularly so, and the upper slopes on both sides have substantial outcrops of steep crags. East of the summit is a second top named Heron Pike (612 metres / 2,008 ft), a rock turret backed by a couple of tiny tarns. (This should not be confused with the Heron Pike that forms part of the Fairfield horseshoe, although it appears that, by coincidence, both Heron Pikes are exactly the same height.)

Standing between two valleys and at the head of a third, the northern slopes of Sheffield Pike are drained by Glencoyne Beck, the southern slopes by Glenridding Beck, and the eastern side by Mossdale Beck.

== Summit ==
The undulating summit plateau of Sheffield Pike has marshy ground and small tarns in places between rocky outcrops, with rough grass and heather. A broad cairn on top of an outcrop of rock marks the summit. Two iron posts, one on Heron Pike and the other above Nick Head, are inscribed “H 1912” on one side and “M 1912” on the other. These mark the boundary between the Howard estate of Greystoke and the Marshall estate of Patterdale. The summit cairn also carries an old stone boundary marker with the H and M initials as well as a cryptic E.R. and the date 1830.

The summit overlooks Glencoyne, but being set back from both the southern and eastern sides of the fell better views may be had from other places. The cairn above Black Crag, or the top of Heron Pike, both give better views of Ullswater, and a well-used sheep path above the crags along the south side of the fell gives the best views of upper Glenridding, backed by Catstye Cam and Helvellyn.

== Ascents ==
Most of the fell, above the Greenside Road and away from the site of the old Greenside Mine, is Open Access land.

Ascents can begin from Glenridding village or from Glencoyne on the track behind Seldom Seen. In either case the route may use either of the two cols, east or west of Sheffield Pike. From Glenridding a track known as The Rake leads to the eastern col, or the track past the former Greenside Mine leads to Nick Head, the western col. The latter route is no longer the industrial nightmare that AW Wainwright complained of in his 1955 guide-book when the mine was still working, but the spoil heaps and some of the mine buildings are still there.

Sheffield Pike can also be included in walks that take in Glenridding Dodd first, and then proceed either to Hart Side for a circuit of Glencoyne, or to Stybarrow Dodd and Helvellyn for a much longer horseshoe of Glenridding.

== Geology ==
Virtually all the rocks of Sheffield Pike are part of the Borrowdale Volcanic Group, formed on the margin of an ancient continent during a period of intense volcanic activity, roughly 450 million years ago in the Ordovician Period.

Within that group, nearly all the rocks on the fell belong to the Birker Fell Andesite Formation. These rocks are part of a thick succession of andesite sheets which now outcrop in a wide band around the western and northern sides of the Lake District. These sheets were formed by successive eruptions of mobile andesitic lava from shallow-sided volcanoes

Between the individual lava flows may be beds of volcaniclastic sandstone, sedimentary deposits formed from the erosion of the volcanic rocks, and the map shows a small deposit of this near the summit of Sheffield Pike.

Two minor igneous intrusions occur on the fell. A basalt dyke of similar age to the volcanic rocks crosses Nick Head, and a later microgranite dyke of Devonian age runs near the top of the crags on the south side of the fell. This was probably associated with the later stages of the emplacement of the granite batholith which underlies the Lake District.

Also associated with the granite batholith was the creation of mineral veins in parts of the Lake District. The richest known lead vein of all was found crossing the south-east shoulder of Green Side, running in a north–south direction.

Mining at Greenside Mine began during the eighteenth century by driving levels into the side of Green Side, but in 1853 a new level was begun from the present entrance to the mine at Lucy's Tongue beneath Nick Head. This was driven north and west for 16 years to intersect the Greenside vein, and allowed deeper levels of the vein to be exploited. Over its lifetime the mine produced 2,400,000 tons of ore, finally closing in 1962.

Considerable evidence of mining remains with extensive spoil heaps on the lower slopes of Sheffield Pike. Part of the mine buildings have been converted into a Youth Hostel. The mine was still working when Alfred Wainwright prepared his Pictorial Guide to the Lakeland Fells.

== Names ==
Sheffield Pike. This name is unexplained. Its first known use is by the Ordnance Survey in 1859. One possibility is that it reflects the influence of the Howard family at Greystoke, the Dukes of Norfolk, who also owned estates in Sheffield, though there is no direct evidence for this explanation. Another possibility is that the original name was something like Sheepfold Pike, and that the pronunciation became corrupted, though again there is no evidence for this. These two explanations need not be mutually exclusive.

Heron Pike was called Herring Pike in nineteenth century guide-books; both names seem equally unlikely. Probably a corruption of Old English erne, 'eagle', plus pike.

== Image gallery ==
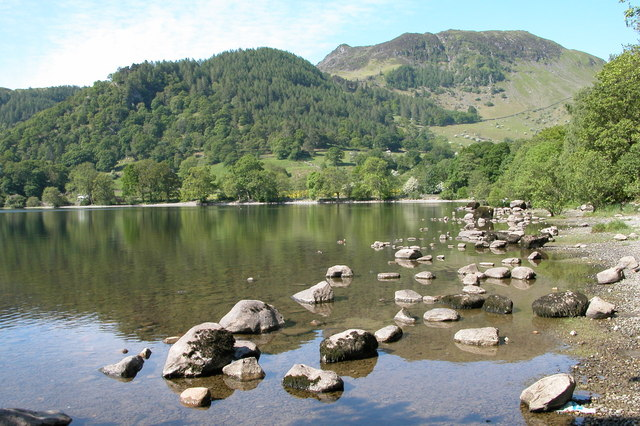
Glenridding Dodd and Sheffield Pike seen from the shores of Ullswater

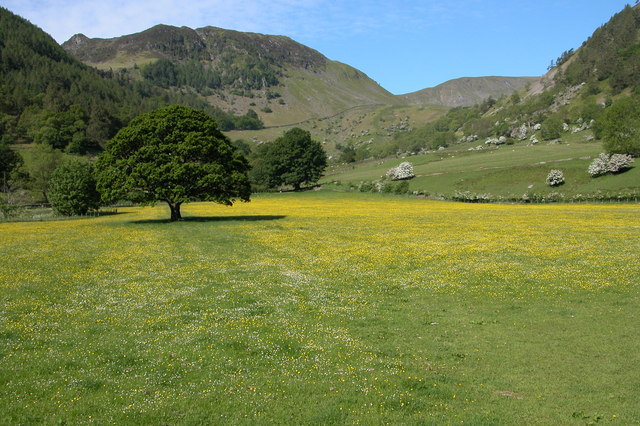
Sheffield Pike seen from Glencoyne

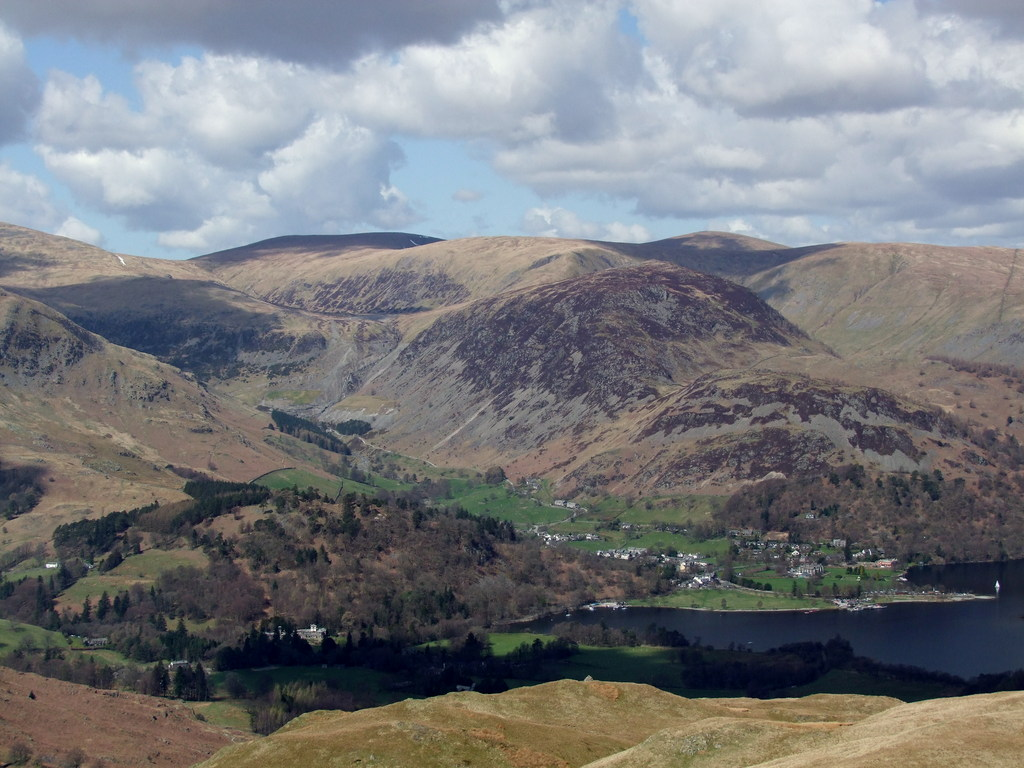
The east ridge of Stybarrow Dodd above Glenridding, seen from Angletarn Pikes

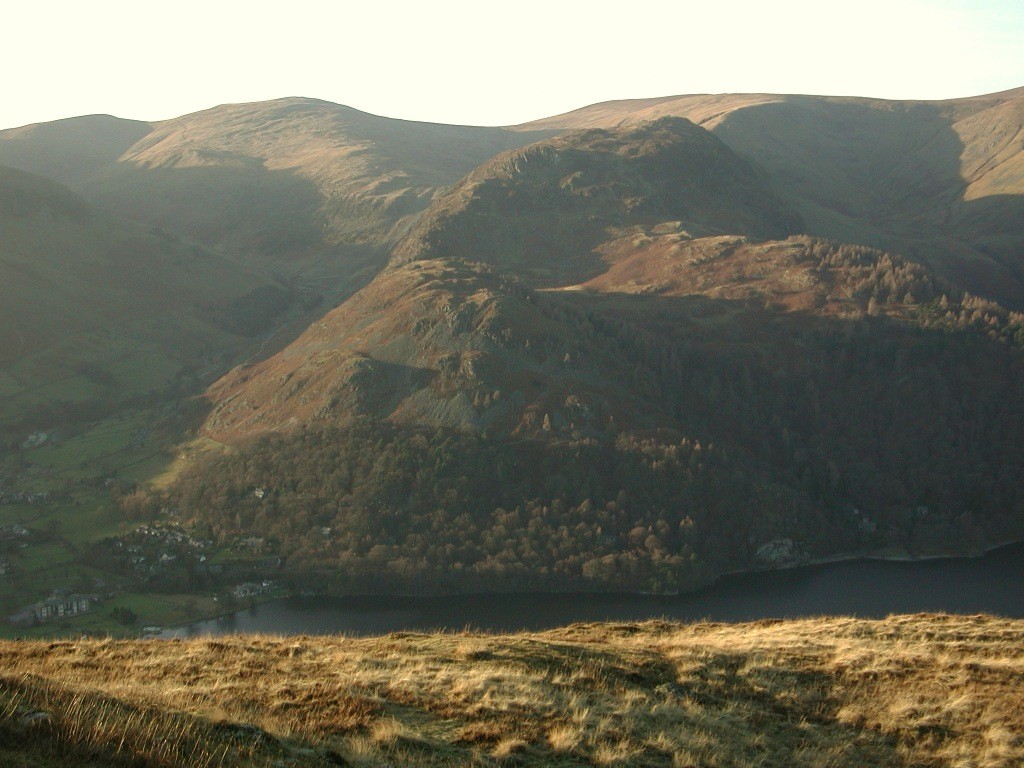
Glenridding Dodd, Heron Pike and Sheffield Pike, seen from Place Fell

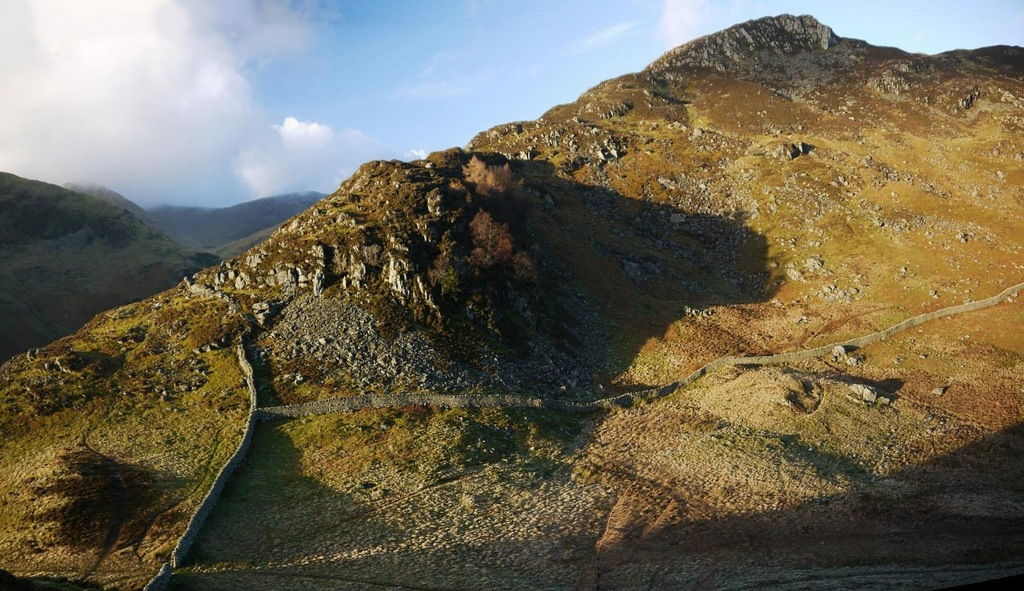
The south-east shoulder of Sheffield Pike with Heron Pike

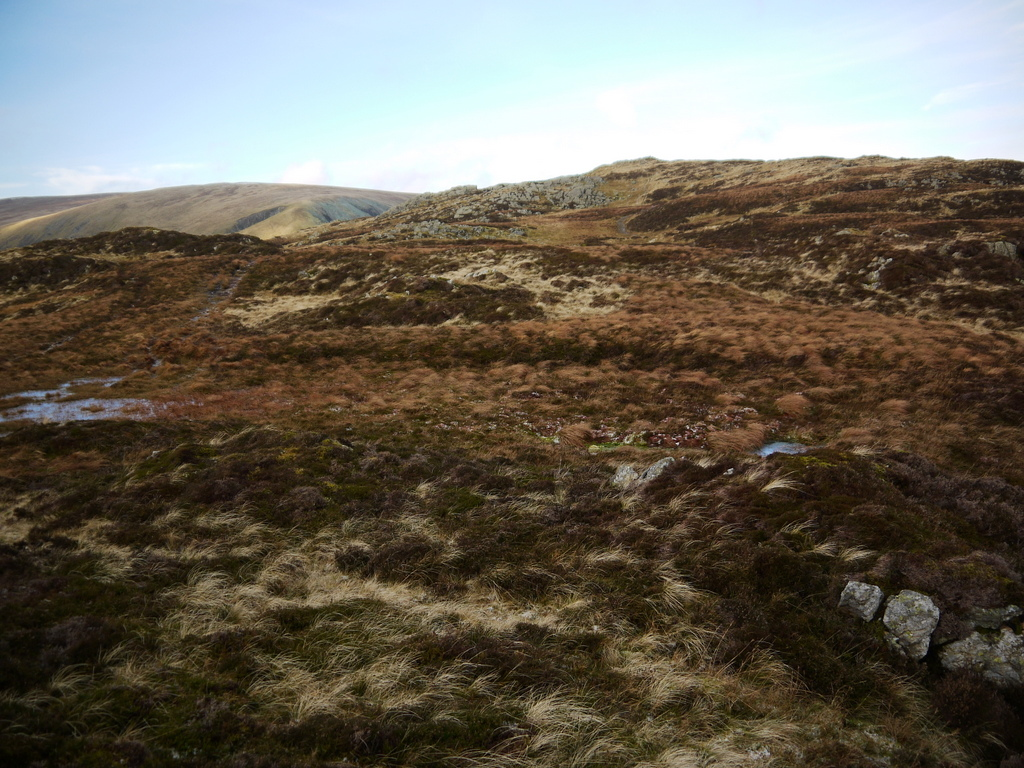
The summit plateau on Sheffield Pike

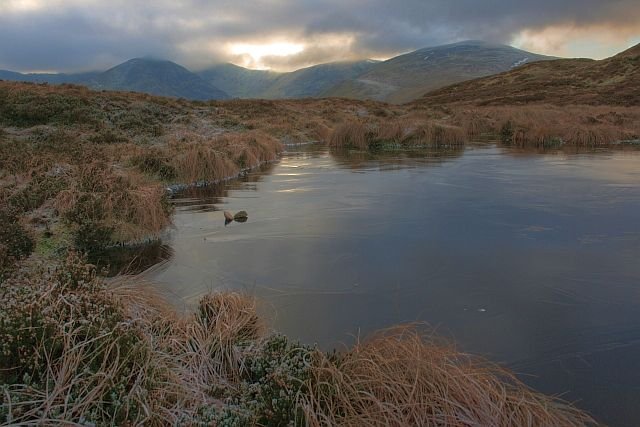
A tarn on Sheffield Pike

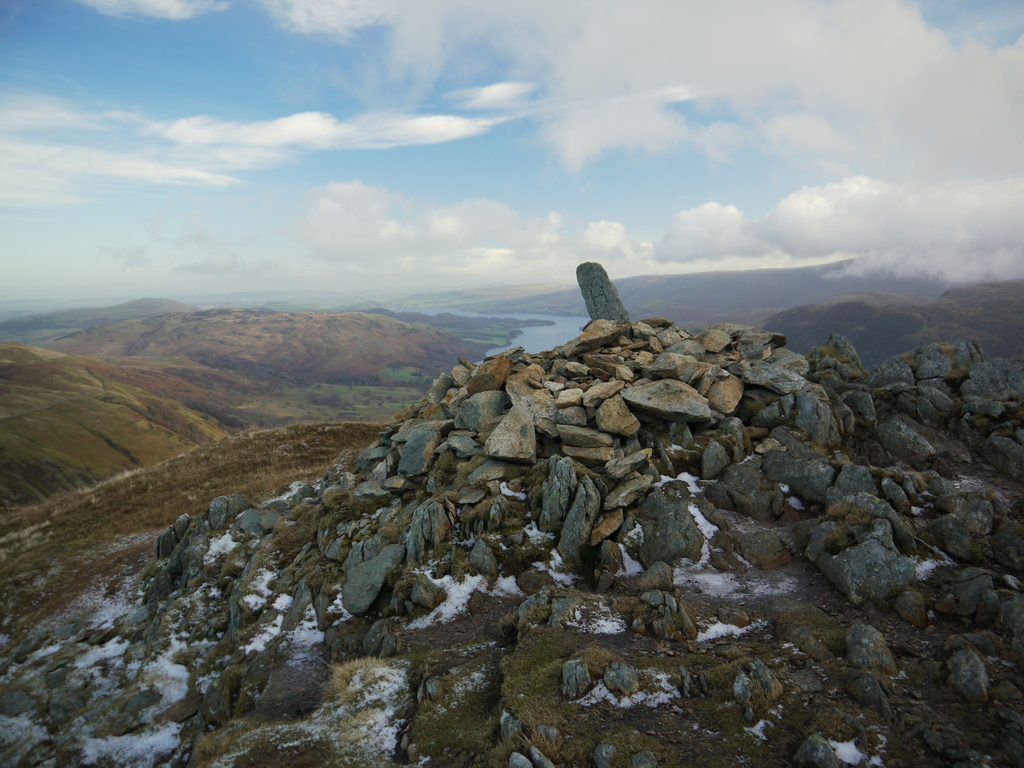
The summit cairn on Sheffield Pike, with stone boundary marker, and Ullswater beyond

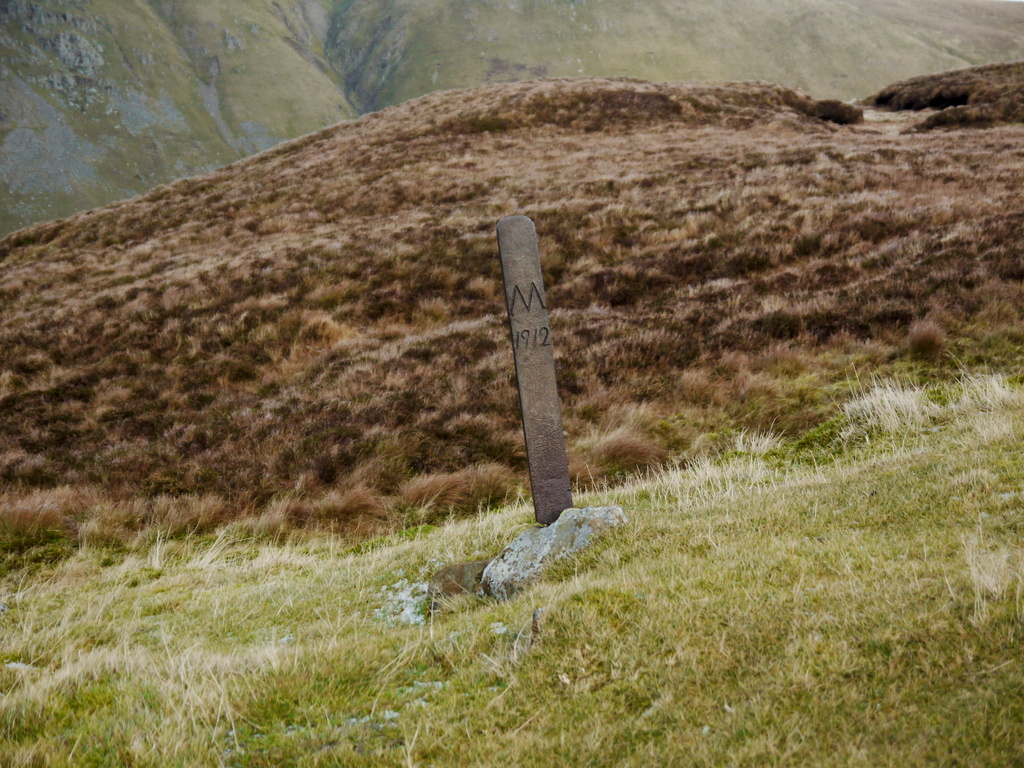
Iron boundary marker on Sheffield Pike

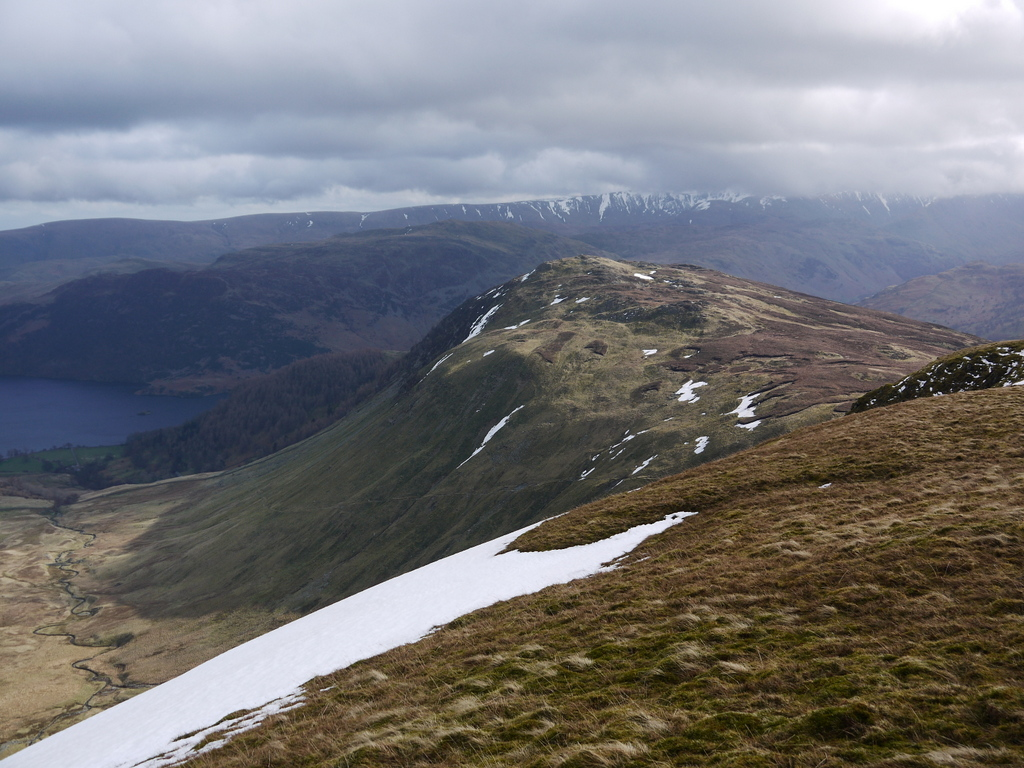
Sheffield Pike, seen on the descent from Green Side

Sheffield Pike, seen from Hart Side
