= Watson's Dodd =

Mountain in the Lake District, Cumbria, England

Watson’s Dodd
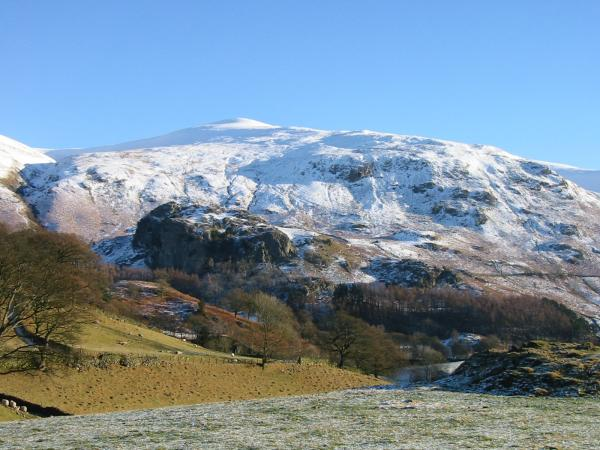
- Watson’s Dodd from the west, with Castle Rock in front of the steep craggy end of the fell

Highest point
- Elevation: 789 m (2,589 ft)
- Prominence: 11 m (36 ft)
- Parent peak: Great Dodd
- Listing: Wainwright
- Coordinates: 54°34′02″N 3°01′43″W

Geography
- Location within the Lake District
- Location: Cumbria, England
- Parent range: Lake District, Eastern Fells
- OS grid: NY336196
- Topo map: OS Explorer OL5

Watson's Dodd is a fell in the English Lake District, a minor rise on the main ridge of the Helvellyn range in the Eastern Fells, but a prominent shoulder on the west side of that range.

At its foot is the imposing crag of Castle Rock, on which rock climbers have developed some 60 named routes.

== Topography ==
Seen from the west, Watson's Dodd is a noticeable shoulder on the Helvellyn ridge, north of Sticks Pass. The summit stands on the main ridge of the Helvellyn range at the point where the south-west ridge of Great Dodd and the north-west ridge of Stybarrow Dodd meet and merge. From this point a shoulder drops into the valley of the How Beck at Legburthwaite. This shoulder, part of the High Fells of St John's Common, is sharply defined by the deep valleys of Mill Gill to its north and Stanah Gill to its south. It slopes gently to around the 500 m contour, and then drops more steeply into the valley over a number of rocky crags. Just before reaching the valley, part of this shoulder rises again to the high, precipitous crag known as Castle Rock.

On the eastern side of the ridge the deep valley of Browndale Beck separates Great Dodd from Stybarrow Dodd, so that Watson's Dodd has no eastern flanks at all other than its triangular summit plateau.

The highest point on Watson's Dodd has an elevation of 789 metres (2,589 ft), a prominence of only 11 metres (36 ft) above the slight depression separating it from Stybarrow Dodd.

Watson's Dodd stands on the main watershed between the Derwent river system to the west, and Ullswater (and the Eden river system) to the east. Streams on the west are now captured by a water leat and diverted into Thirlmere reservoir.

== Castle Rock ==
Standing at the top of the Vale of St John's, the nearly vertical Castle Rock juts out from the hillside with rock faces on three sides. The castle-like profile is made still more picturesque by a garland of mixed woodland around the lower slopes. This rock has attracted the admiring views of visitors since the start of tourism to the Lakes. Thomas West in 1778 referred to the valley ‘nobly terminated by the castle-like rock of St. John’. Jonathan Otley in 1823 knew the rock as ‘the massive rock of Green Crag, sometimes called the Castle Rock of St. John's’. The Scottish lawyer and novelist Sir Walter Scott, wrote his romantic narrative-poem The Bridal of Triermain in 1812. In this, Castle Rock appears as the setting for the Enchanted Castle from which the hero, Sir Roland de Vaux of Triermain, must rescue the maiden, Gyneth. Triermain was the name of a fiefdom in the barony of Gilsland in north-east Cumberland; a pele-tower near Birdoswald still bears the name.

The association with Walter Scott's poem has sometimes led Castle Rock to be called Castle Rock of Triermain, especially by rock climbers in order to distinguish it from another Castle Rock in Gloucestershire.

Climbers have discovered and named over 60 routes up the rock. The precipitous North Crag (75 metres / 246 feet high) was first climbed by Jim Birkett on April Fools' Day, 1939, by a route called Overhanging Bastion. Since 2011 the North Crag has been considered dangerous because a large crack has opened up at the top creating the potential for a massive rockfall. South Crag (35 metres / 110 foot} high) is less steep, sunnier and quicker-drying, and holds the less difficult routes.

The summit of Castle Rock has an elevation of 339 metres (1,112 ft), with a prominence of 29 metres (95 ft) from the fellside behind it.

== Summit ==
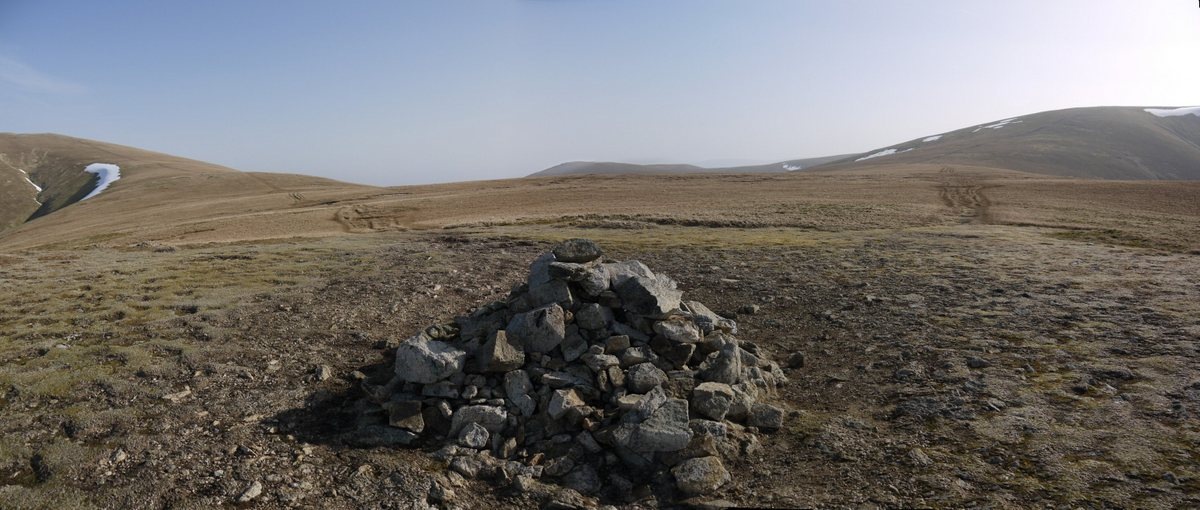
The summit of Watson's Dodd, seen from the cairn, with Great Dodd (left) and Stybarrow Dodd (right)

The summit of Watson's Dodd is a grassy triangular plateau which slopes gently to the east and is bounded by paths on all three sides. Its highest point, at the western apex of the triangle, is marked by a small cairn.

The view from the summit is ‘sumptuous’. Standing to the west of the main ridge, the summit gives a panoramic view from Blencathra and Skiddaw in the north, round to the Coniston group in the south. The view extends over Thirlmere to the central fells, and is bounded by the western and northwestern fells. On a clear day the hills of south-west Scotland are also visible.

== Ascents ==
Routes to the top begin from the B5322 road, where parking is available at Legburthwaite or at Stanah village hall. There are no marked paths up the fellside. Keeping to the crest of the ridge (after avoiding the initial rocky crags, or after visiting Castle Rock if wished) leads unfailingly to the summit cairn.

The summit may also be visited by following the well-used paths along the main Helvellyn ridge, though many ridge walkers appear to bypass the summit.

== Geology ==
The rocks of Watson's Dodd are all part of the Borrowdale Volcanic Group, formed on the margin of an ancient continent during a period of intense volcanic activity, roughly 450 million years ago in the Ordovician Period.

Within that group, the bulk of the rocks forming the fell belong to the Birker Fell Andesite Formation. These rocks are among the earliest of the volcanic rocks of the Borrowdale Volcanic Group, and are part of a thick succession of andesite sheets which now outcrop in a wide band around the western and northern sides of the Lake District. These sheets were formed by successive eruptions of mobile andesitic lava from shallow-sided volcanoes.

Between the individual lava flows may be beds of volcaniclastic sandstone, sedimentary deposits formed from the erosion of the volcanic rocks. The geological map shows small deposits of this on the fellside, as well as some lapilli tuff resulting from a more explosive eruption.

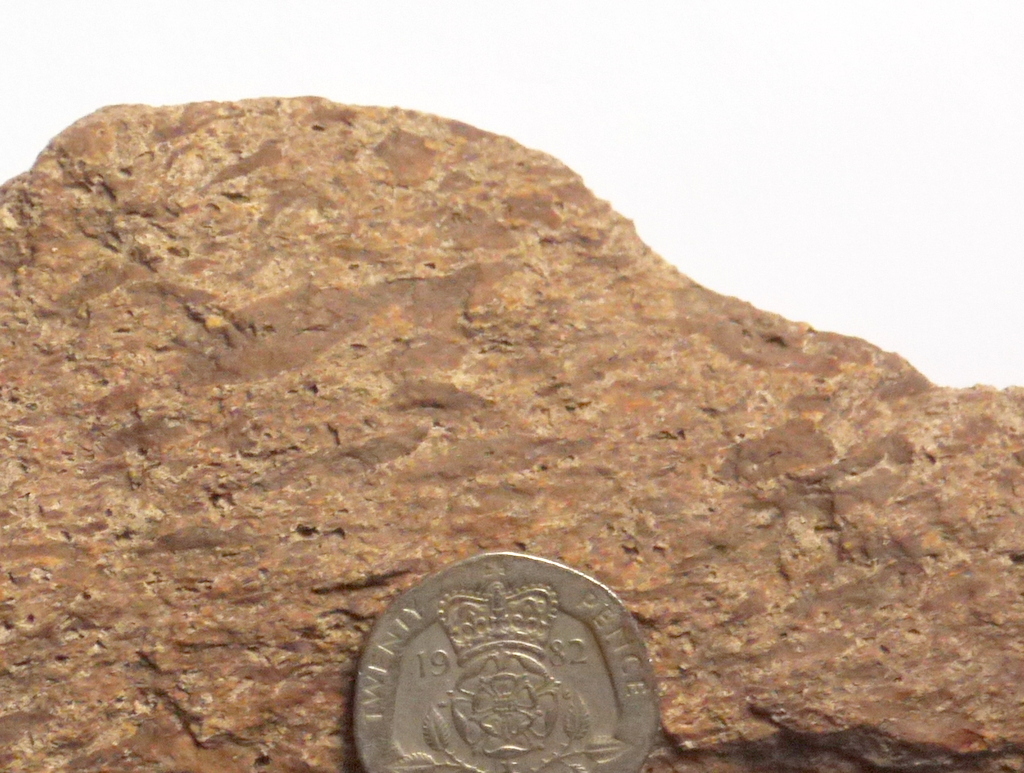
A piece of welded ignimbrite of the Thirlmere Tuff Member, showing flattened lapilli - found on the path between Great Dodd and Stybarrow Dodd

After the eruptions of the Birker Fell Formation the composition of the erupting magma changed from andesitic to dacitic, and as a result the nature of the volcanism became more explosive. In the area to the north of Sticks Pass the Birker Fell andesites are overlain by the Lincomb Tarns Tuff Formation. This formation is one of the most widespread of the volcanic rocks of the Lake District; it seems that the whole district was buried beneath at least 150 m of densely welded ignimbrite, a rock formed from pyroclastic flows of very hot gas and rock. This formation must represent a series of eruptions of truly exceptional magnitude, accompanying the formation of a volcanic caldera, probably in the area around where Helvellyn stands today.

On Watson's Dodd this formation is represented by two members. The Tarn Crags Member makes up Castle Rock, as well as a thin layer higher up the fellside at about the 650 m contour. It is a coarse-grained dacitic lapilli tuff. Above this thin layer are rocks of the Thirlmere Tuff Member, which covers the top of the fell. First is an area of volcaniclastic breccia, which forms a series of small rocky outcrops on the fellside, and above this is a thick sheet of welded rhyo-dacitic lapilli tuff in which the individual pieces of semi-molten lava (the lapilli) were flattened under the weight of deposits above them. This rock weathers to a white or pink colour, but it is covered by the smooth grassy turf characteristic of Great Dodd, Watson's Dodd and Stybarrow Dodd, all of which are covered by the same sheet.

== Names ==
Watson's Dodd. Dod or dodd is a dialect word of unknown origin, but is common in hill names in the Lake District and the Scottish Borders for bare rounded summits, either free standing or subsidiary shoulders to higher neighbours. The Watson whose name this fell commemorates is unknown. There may (or may not) be a connection with Watson's Park in the same parish of St John's. If so, since that name is first recorded in 1734, Watson must have lived no later than the early eighteenth century.

== Image gallery ==
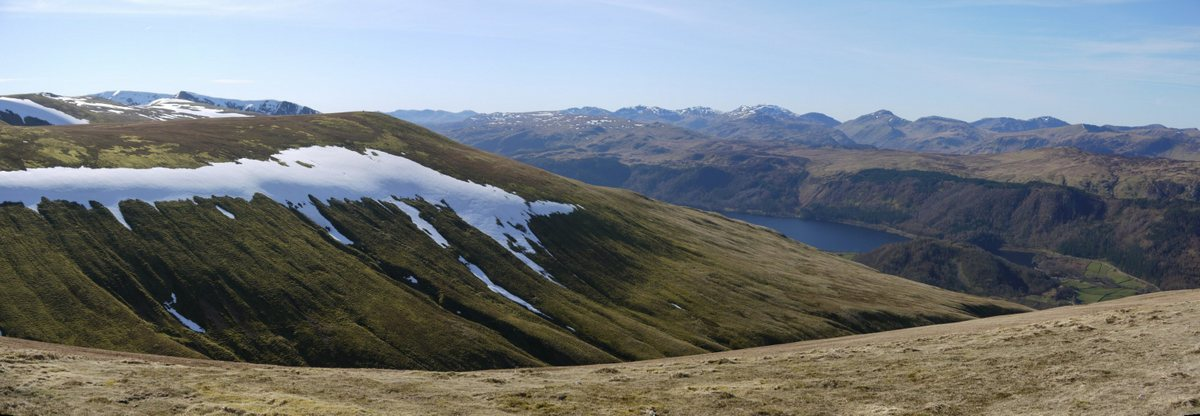
Watson’s Dodd, seen from the west ridge of Great Dodd, across Mill Gill

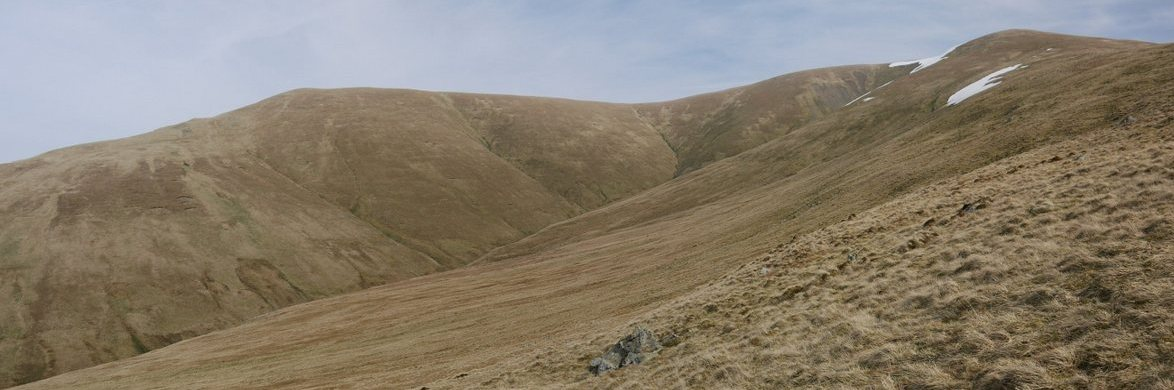
Watson’s Dodd, seen from the west ridge of Stybarrow Dodd, across Stanah Gill

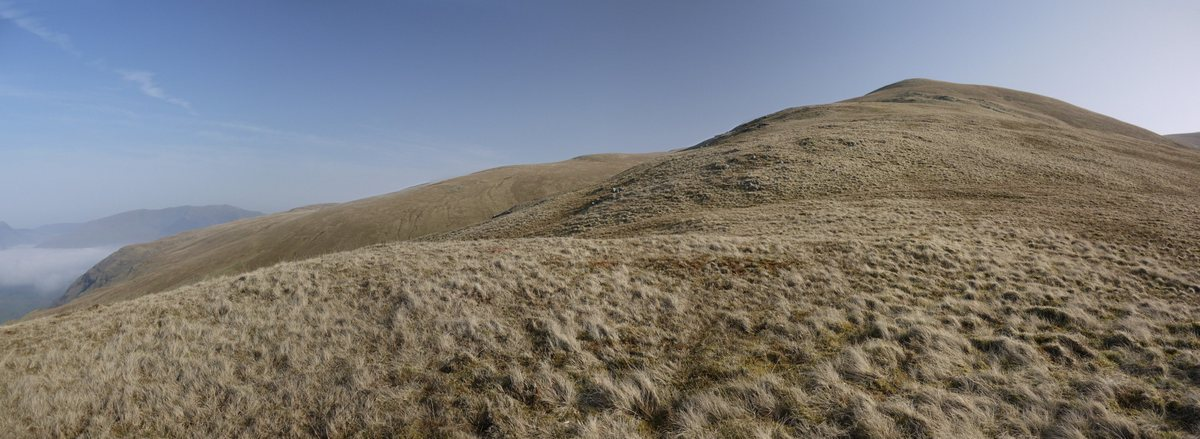
Looking up the west ridge of Watson’s Dodd
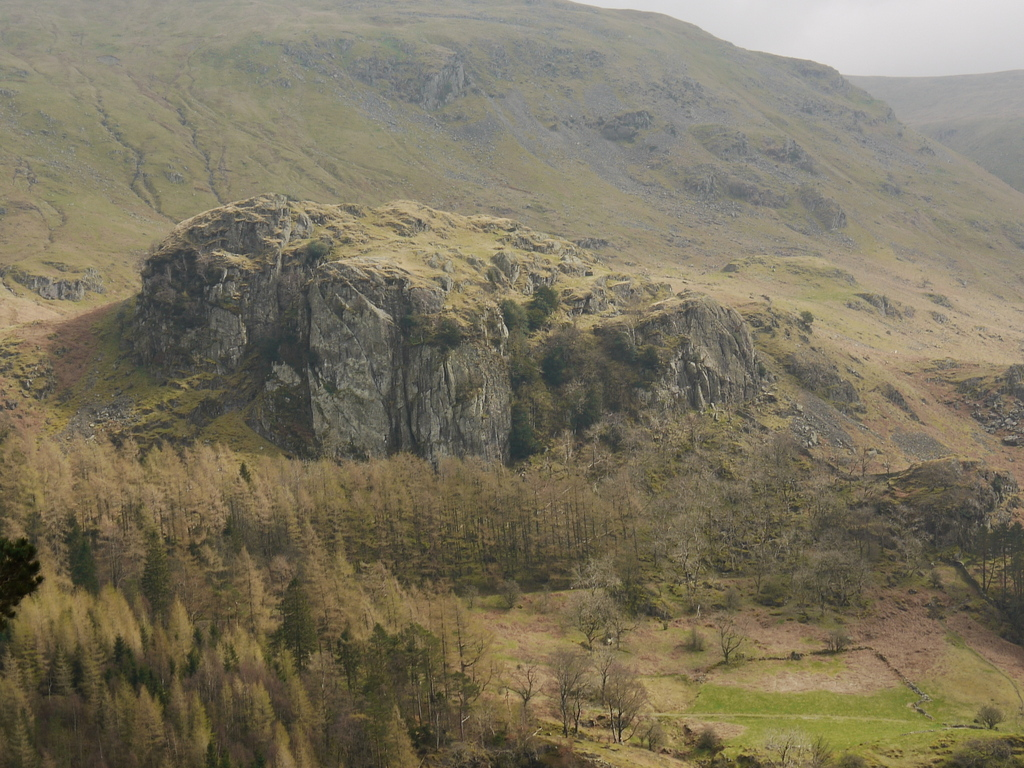
Castle Crag, with North Crag in the centre and South Crag to the right of the trees

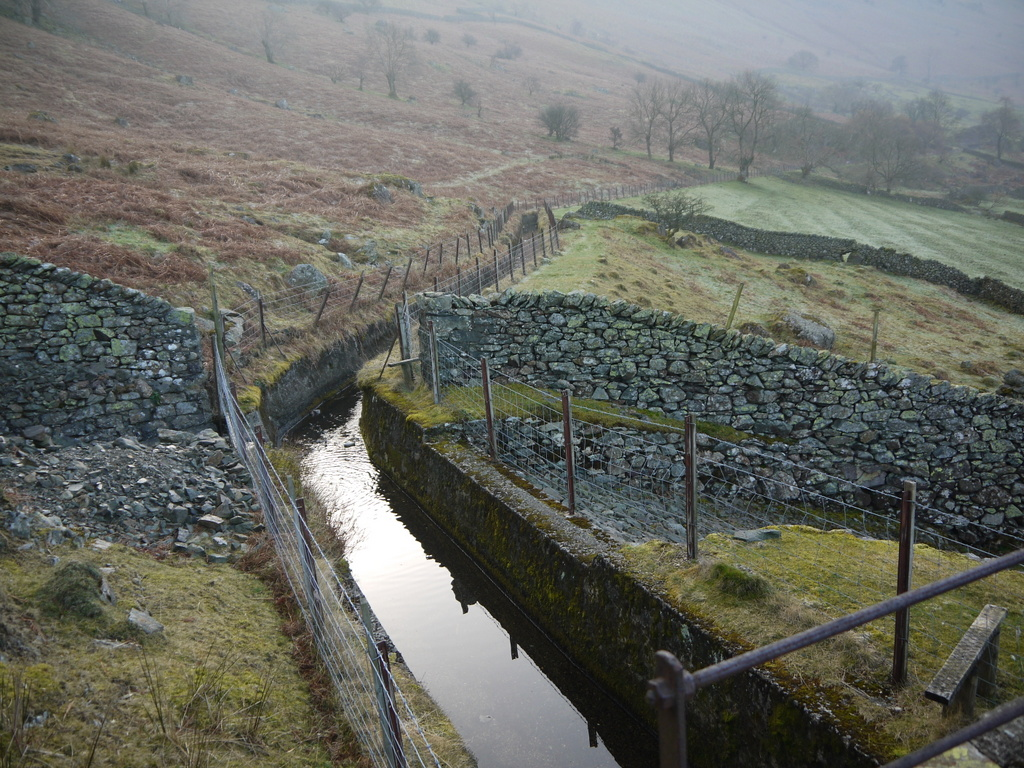
The water leat below Watson's Dodd

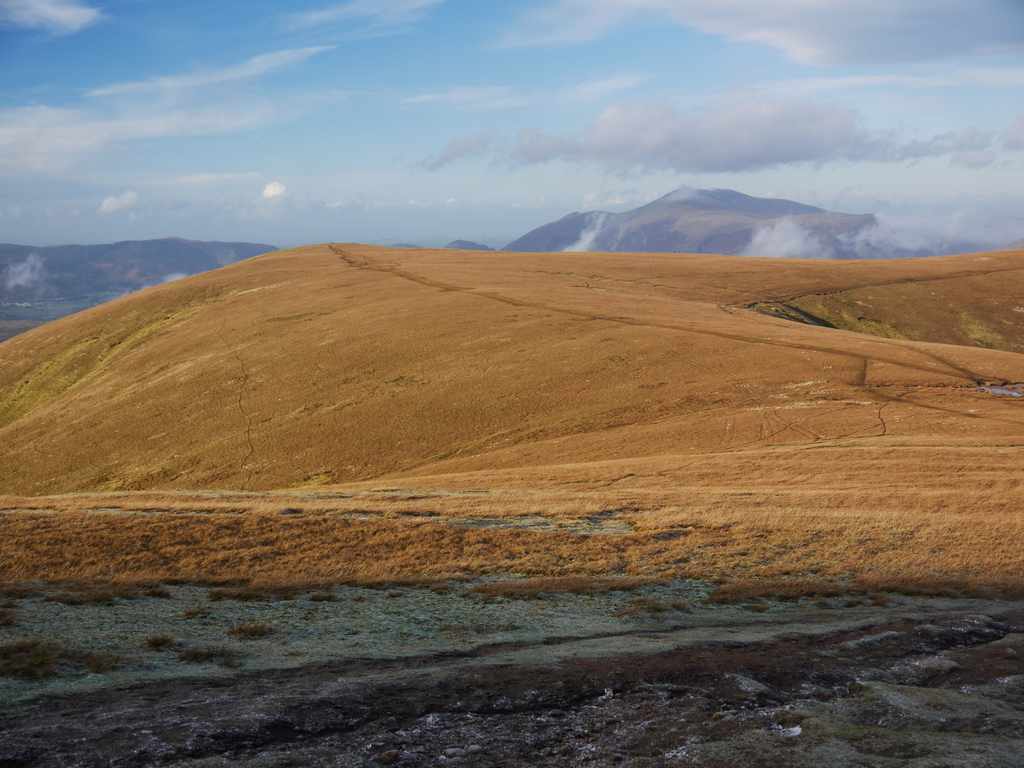
Watson's Dodd seen from Stybarrow Dodd. The slight col is to the far right.

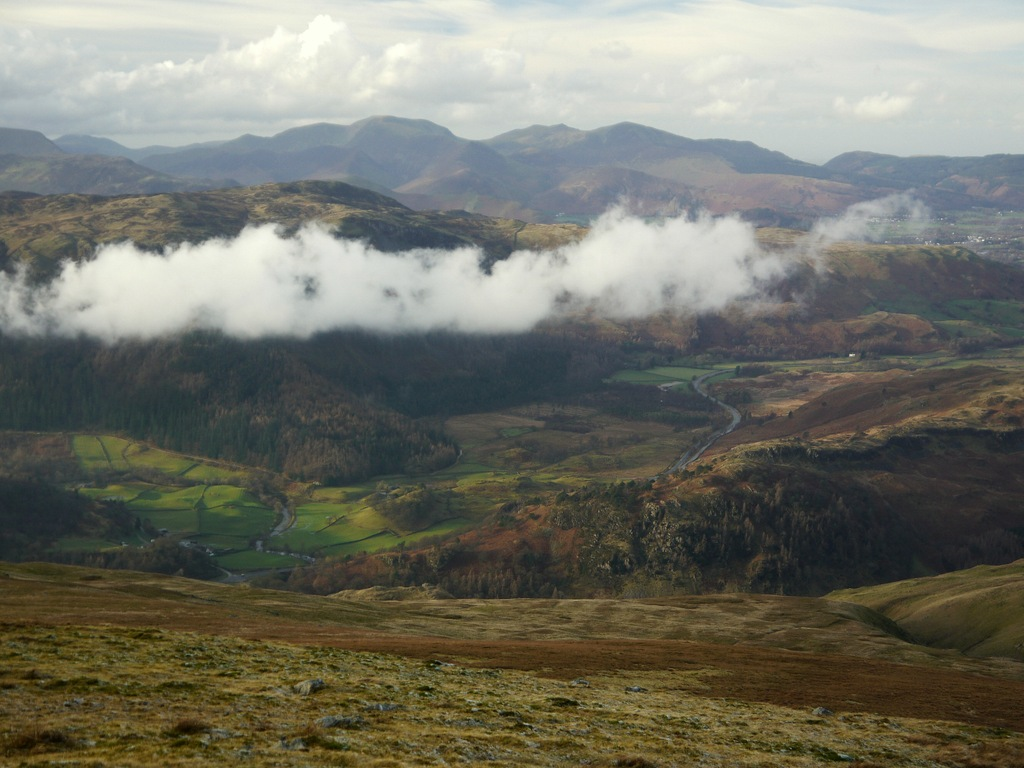
View towards the northwestern fells from Watson's Dodd

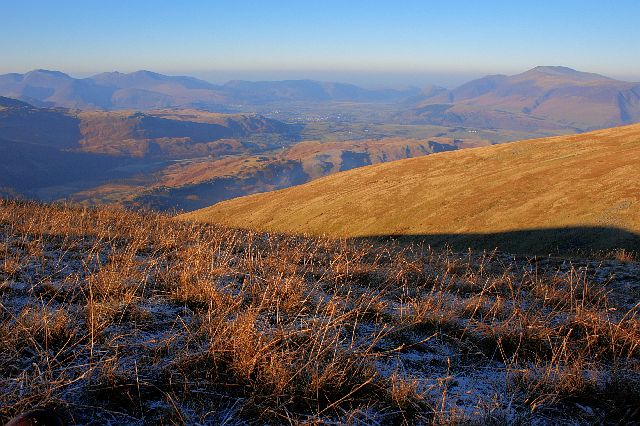
View towards Keswick and Bassenthwaite Lake from Watson's Dodd
