= Hart Side =

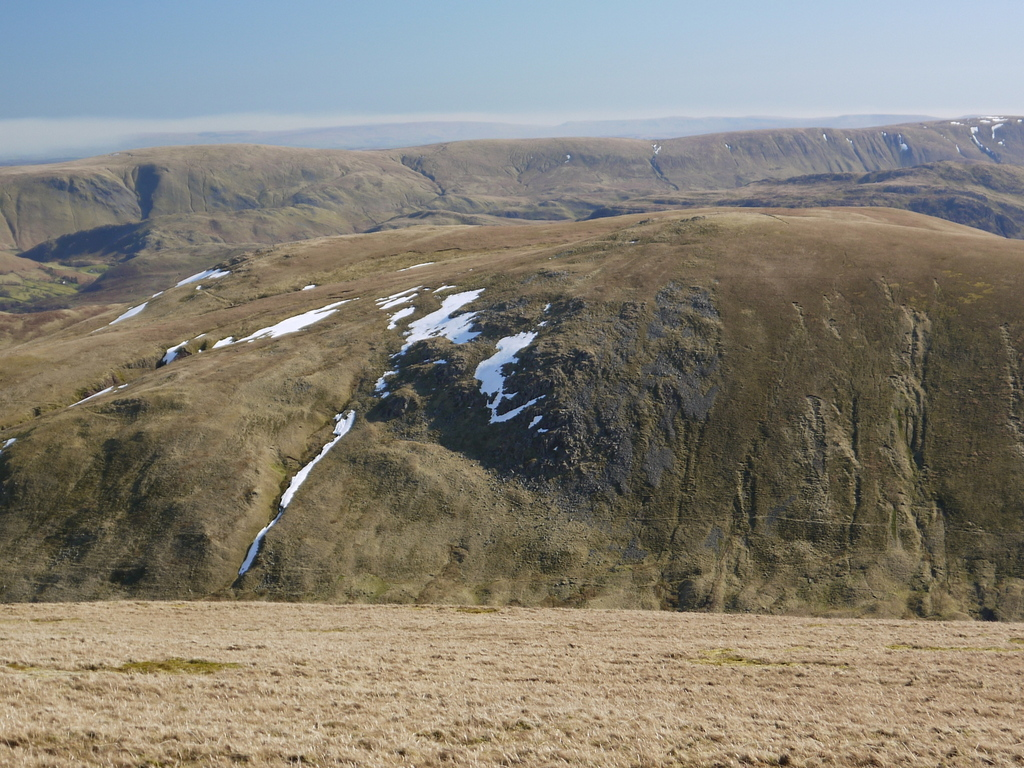
- Hart Side seen from Great Dodd

Highest point
- Elevation: 756 m (2,480 ft)
- Prominence: 75 ft (23 m)
- Parent peak: Green Side
- Listing: Nuttall, Wainwright
- Coordinates: 54°34′10″N 2°59′35″W

Geography
- Location within the Lake District
- Location: Cumbria, England
- Parent range: Lake District, Eastern Fells
- OS grid: NY359198
- Topo map: OS Explorer OL5

Hart Side (the hill side frequented by harts) is a subsidiary top on one of the east ridges of Stybarrow Dodd, which is a mountain (or fell) in the English Lake District, west of Ullswater on the main Helvellyn ridge in the Eastern Fells. With a height of 2,480 feet (760 m) Hart Side rises above the col separating it from Green Side by 75 feet (23 m).

Some guide-book writers have treated Hart Side as a distinct fell, and have devoted a separate chapter to it. The same writers have treated the lower Watermillock Common as part of (or associated with) the fell. Other writers have simply focussed on routes to and between the many individual tops here and throughout Lakeland.

Hart Side and Green Side are the two ends of a ridge which is composed of andesite rock, a sequence of lava flows from ancient volcanoes. A lead vein in the Green Side end of the ridge was exploited by the most successful lead mine in the Lake District until it closed in 1962.

== Topography ==
The east ridge of Stybarrow Dodd falls about 262 feet (80 m) to a broad col from which the ground rises again. From this point the combined Hart Side and Green Side ridge has a smooth, rounded, grassy top and winds for some 1 1/2 miles (2.4 km) to the north-east. After rising 98 feet (30 m) to White Stones, the summit of Green Side (2,608 feet; 795 m), it loses 203 feet (62 m) of height before rising again from a broad, gentle col, but regains only 75 feet (23 m) to the summit of Hart Side (2,480 feet; 756 m).

At this point the ridge turns abruptly to the south of east and after losing roughly 66 feet (20 m) again it rises to a broad, rounded, unnamed grassy swelling with a height of about 2,428 feet (740 m). A north-east shoulder of this swelling ends with steeper gradients on all sides and a scattering of broken crags ahead. This shoulder was named Birkett Fell in 1963, but it has just 6 1/2 feet (2.0 m) prominence above the ridge it terminates.

This ridge of Stybarrow Dodd continues to the east as Watermillock Common after a further drop of over 656 feet (200 m).

To the north and west of the Hart Side and Green Side ridge, and to the east of Birkett Fell, grassy slopes drop into Deepdale, with an outcrop of rock just beneath the Hart Side summit, called Hart Crag, and the broken crags beneath Birkett Fell. This Deepdale should not be confused with the valley of the same name near Patterdale. These sides of the ridge are drained by Aira Beck into Ullswater.

Much steeper crags line the south of Hart Side and the east of Green Side. This is Glencoyne Head, where a corrie glacier formed during the final phase of the last ice age and created these steep cliffs. These slopes drain into Glencoyne and then to Ullswater.

To complete the picture, the south side of Green Side also falls steeply and over rocky crags in places into the valley of Stick's Gill (East), which also drains into Ullswater via the Glenridding Beck.

== Summit ==
The summit of Hart Side is mainly grassy but with a scattering of rocky boulders showing through the grass. Some small cairns have been built on it, and there is another cairn some 164 feet (50 m) north of the summit, but the most unusual features are a long east–west trench which has been dug a few yards to the south, and a shallow hollow measuring 23 by 13 feet (7 by 4 m) just to the north. The trench was probably dug by prospectors looking for an extension to the vein being mined beneath Green Side, and the hollow may have been the site of some shelter. A vigorous programme of exploration, both underground and on the surface, was begun in 1947 when it was clear that the Greenside Mine could not last much longer, but nothing was found. In Alfred Wainwright's 1955 drawing the trench looks much cleaner and fresher than it is today

The view from the summit is restricted both by the higher ridge to the west, and by intervening land to the east which conceals most of Ullswater. There are distant glimpses of Catstye Cam and Helvellyn, a closer view of Great Dodd and Stybarrow Dodd across Deepdale, and even a glimpse of Scafell Pike through the gap between Green Side and Stybarrow Dodd.

A much better viewpoint for Ullswater and the east is found at Birkett Fell, where there is a cairn built from stones carried up from the shores of Ullswater by members of the Outward Bound School in Watermillock. The cairn carries a stone plaque with the name of the fell, which was named in honour of Lord Birkett of Ulverston and in recognition of the part played by him in preventing Ullswater from being made into a reservoir.

== Ascents ==
The whole of the Hart Side and Green Side ridge, of Watermillock Common, and much of Glencoyne is now Open Access land.

Several routes lead to the top of Hart Side from the north-east. From the car park at High Row an ascent can be made via Dowthwaitehead and Birkett Fell. From Dockray, or the two car parks on the A5091 road (which serve Aira Force), ascents can be made via Watermillock Common (or the slopes to the south of it) and Birkett Fell.

From the south an ascent is possible via the south-east shoulder of Green Side, above the old Greenside lead mine, or a steep, pathless ascent can be made from the old Miners’ Balcony Path around the head of Glencoyne beside Deepdale Slack and between the crags.

Hart Side may also be visited as part of a circuit of Deepdale which takes in the three Dodds.

== Geology ==
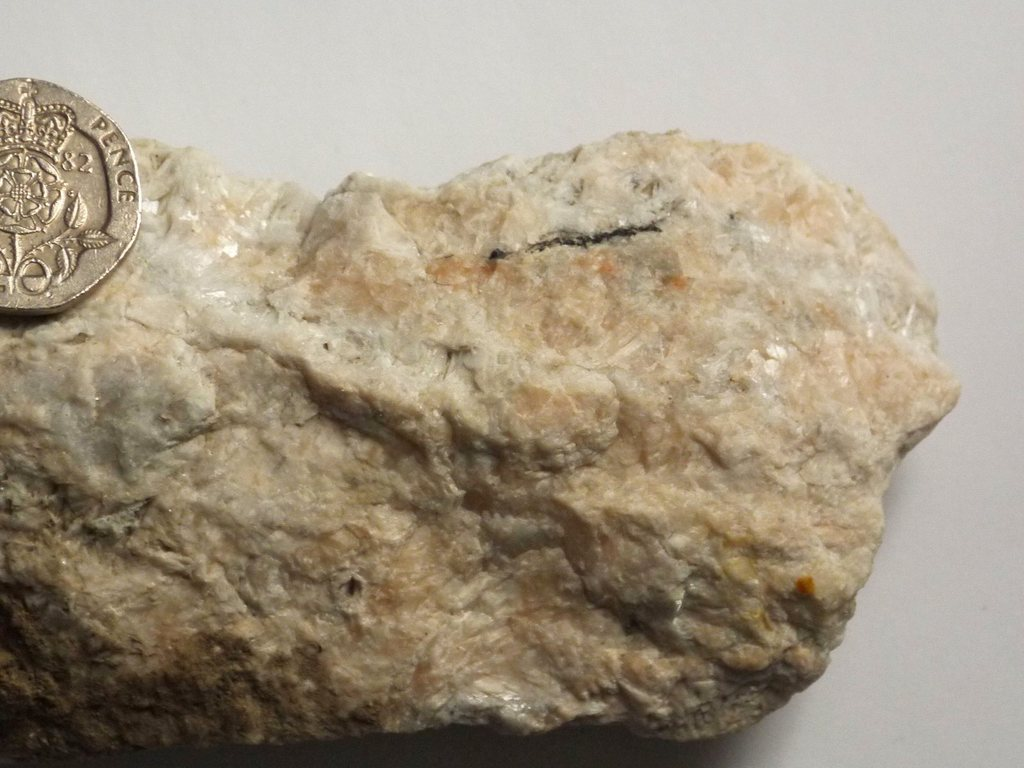
A piece of baryte, from the spoil heap outside the Glencoyne entrance to the Greenside Mine

The rocks of Hart Side and Green Side are all part of the Borrowdale Volcanic Group, formed on the margin of an ancient continent during a period of intense volcanic activity, roughly 450 million years ago in the Ordovician Period.

Virtually all the rocks on the fell belong to the Birker Fell Andesite Formation. This was formed predominantly by eruptions of mobile andesitic lava from shallow-sided volcanoes. These rocks are part of a thick succession of lava sheets found around the western and northern sides of the Lake District.

Some microgranite dykes were later intruded into the andesite which now forms the crags of Glencoyne Head. These are of early Devonian age and were probably associated with the later stages of the emplacement of the granite batholith which underlies the Lake District.

Also associated with the granite batholith was the creation of mineral veins in parts of the Lake District. The richest known lead vein of all was found crossing the south-east shoulder of Green Side. This, the Greenside Lead Vein runs in a north–south direction and dips steeply to the east at 70°. It was up to 59 feet (18 m) wide in the highest workings of the Greenside Mine, but averaged about 8 feet (2.4 m) wide in deeper workings. The vein contained galena in a mixture of quartz and smashed rock. Galena (lead sulphide) is an ore of lead. The ore from Greenside also yielded 10 oz of silver per ton of lead. Higher levels of the vein also contained quantities of baryte (barium sulphate), although at the time this had no commercial value. Very small amounts of blende (zinc sulphide) and chalcopyrite (copper-iron sulphide) were found in the deeper levels, but never in recoverable quantities.

The Greenside Mine worked this vein from some time in the 1700s until reserves were exhausted in 1962. The main entrance was in Glenridding at Lucy's Tongue, but an exploratory level was driven into the cliffs at the top of Glencoyne, from just below the Miners' Balcony Path. In 1955 this was incorporated into an emergency back exit from the mine. Alfred Wainwright found the hole, but thought it was just a cave.

Underlying the andesite lavas of the Borrowdale Volcanic Group are the mudstones of the Skiddaw Group of rocks. These were encountered in the lowest workings of the Greenside Mine, some 3,000 feet (910 m) beneath the surface of the fell. The lead vein the miners were following became barren on encountering these rocks.

== Watermillock Common ==
Watermillock Common
- Common Fell
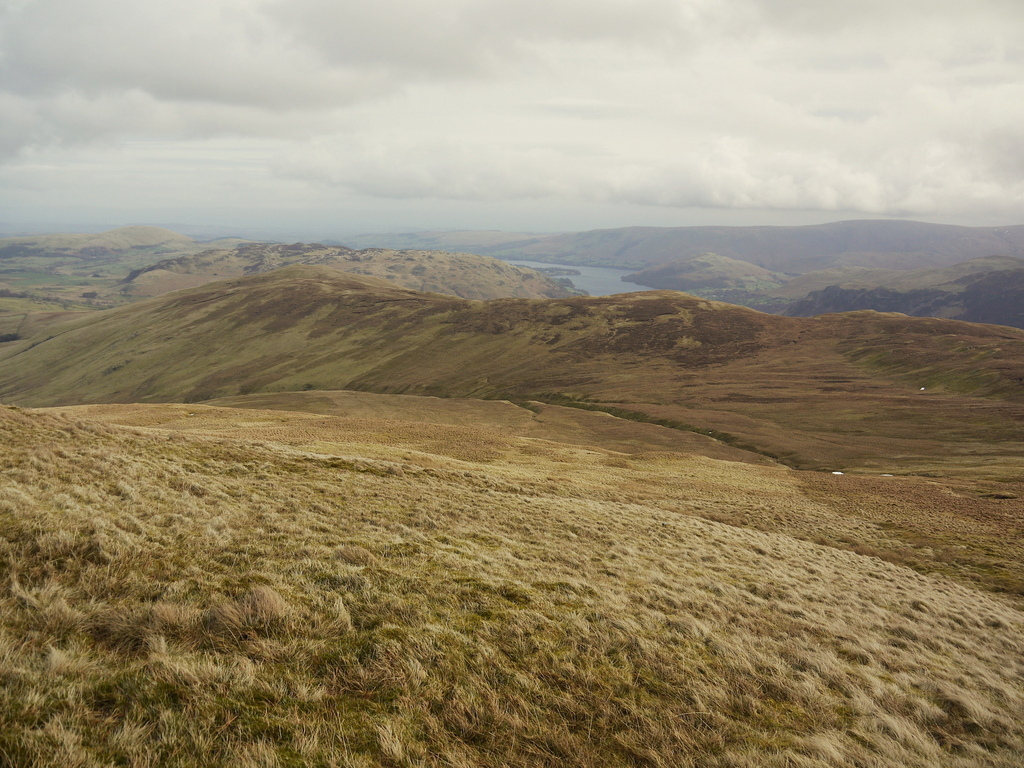
- Watermillock Common seen from Birkett Fell

Highest point
- Elevation: 1,814 ft (553 m)
- Prominence: 49 ft (15 m)
- Parent peak: Hart Side

Geography
- OS grid: NY 379197

Watermillock Common (The unenclosed common grazing land of Watermillock parish) is a ridge of high land which rises 1,312 feet (400 m) above Ullswater. It is the end part of one of the long eastern ridges of Stybarrow Dodd, and lies 656 feet (200 m) lower than the Hart Side part of the ridge.

Topography: This part of the ridge runs roughly north-east for about 1 3/4 miles (2.8 km) from the Brown Hills at the foot of Hart Side. The ridge is drained on its northern and eastern sides by Aira Beck, while its south-eastern slopes drain directly into Ullswater. Aira Beck has cut a steep gorge between Watermillock Common and Gowbarrow Fell, which continues the line of high ground further east.

Summits and views: The highest point on Watermillock Common is Swineside Knott 1,814 feet (553 m), a rounded grassy mound but with some rocks protruding, especially on its steep eastern side. Swineside Knott has what has been claimed to be "the most sumptuous view" of Ullswater; certainly it is the most extensive view, from the head of the lake (and the fells on either side of Patterdale beyond that) to the foot of the lake at Pooley Bridge.

Common Fell at 1,811 feet (552 m) is only 3 feet (0.91 m) lower than Swineside Knott, but is more centrally placed on the ridge and so feels more like its natural summit. It consists of a number of rounded grassy mounds. A small cairn has been built on the highest one, but a remarkable glacial erratic boulder is perched on one of the other mounds. Common Fell gives good views to the north and east.

Two lower tops at the east end of the ridge are Round How (1,270 feet; 390 m) and Bracken How (1,214 feet; 370 m), both rounded grassy mounds punctuated with some rock and with small cairns on top.

Ascents: Apart from the lower slopes beside Aira Beck, around Dockray and alongside Ullswater, Watermillock Common is Open Access land. Paths across the common begin from the village of Dockray and from the two car parks on the A5091 road. One writer has claimed the ridge top near Common Fell "can be more of a wade than a walk", but this was not found to be so early in 2014 after an unusually wet winter.

Geology: The oldest rocks found on the Watermillock Common ridge occur on the lower south eastern slopes (above Ullswater) where faulting has brought to the present surface an inlier of mudstone from the Tarn Moor Formation, the latest part of the Skiddaw Group. These mudstones were deposited in deep seas about 470 million years ago during the Ordovician period.

The remainder of the ridge consists of andesite rocks of the Birker Fell Andesite Formation. These rocks are a succession of sheets of andesite lava flows which came from shallow-sided volcanoes. Here and there the map shows beds of volcaniclastic sandstone or breccia, sedimentary deposits formed from the erosion of the volcanic rocks. Around the summit of Common Fell it shows areas of hyaloclastite, a rock made up of shattered angular fragments and formed by the quenching of lava in water. However, smooth grassy turf covers these rocks from view.

== Names ==
Hart Side takes its name from the fell side, the two English words signifying the hill side frequented by harts. A hart is a fully mature male red deer, at least five years old. The name of the fell is first recorded by the Ordnance Survey in 1867. Panoramas in earlier 19th century guidebooks label the fell as Glen Coin Fell, which may have been an alternative or an earlier name.

Green Side also takes its name from the fell side, the two English words being self-explanatory.

Watermillock Common was the unenclosed grazing land of the parish of Watermillock, which was incorporated into Matterdale parish in 1934. It lay outside the enclosed Gowbarrow deer park, the wall of which may be seen crossing the hill on its south side.

Birkett Fell, previously marked on Ordnance Survey maps of 1867 and 1920 as Nameless Fell was named in 1963 to commemorate Lord Birkett of Ulverston. In 1962, two days before his death, Lord Birkett made his last speech in the House of Lords in which, with the eloquence for which he was famed, he opposed a provision in the Manchester Corporation Bill which would have allowed Ullswater to be made into a reservoir for that city. As a result, that provision was voted out of the bill, to the great delight of many who loved the Lake District.

== Image gallery ==
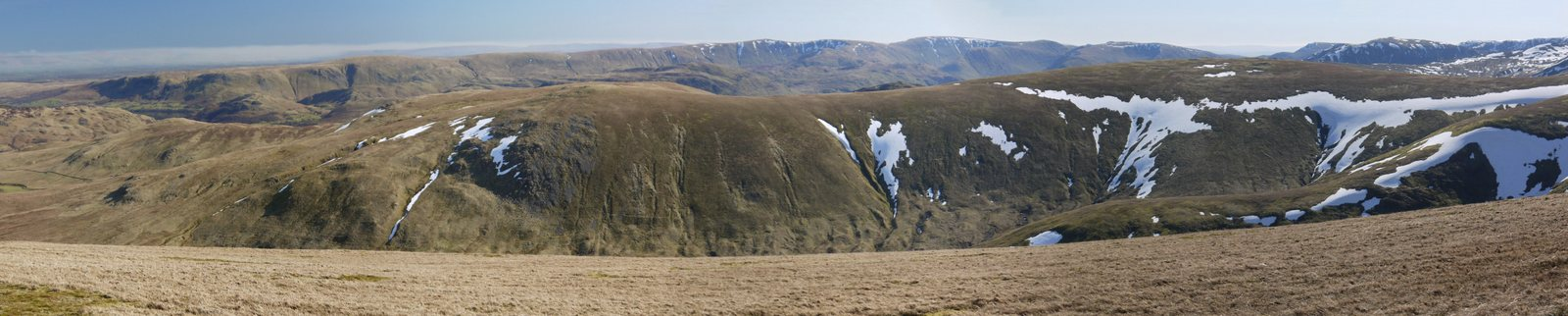
The whole Green Side and Hart Side ridge, with Watermillock Common to the left, seen from Great Dodd
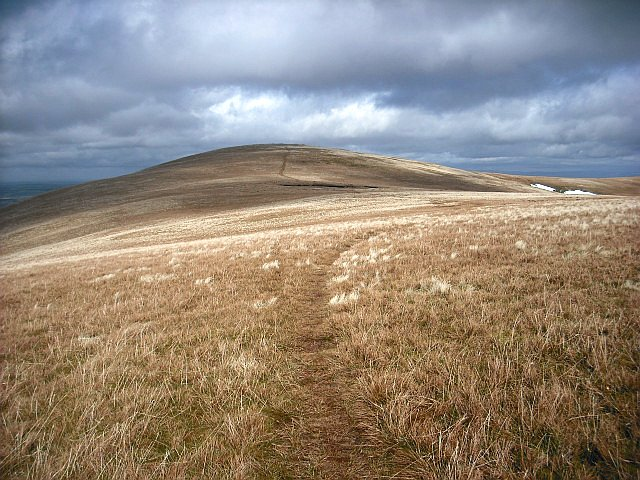
Looking along the ridge from Green Side towards Hart Side

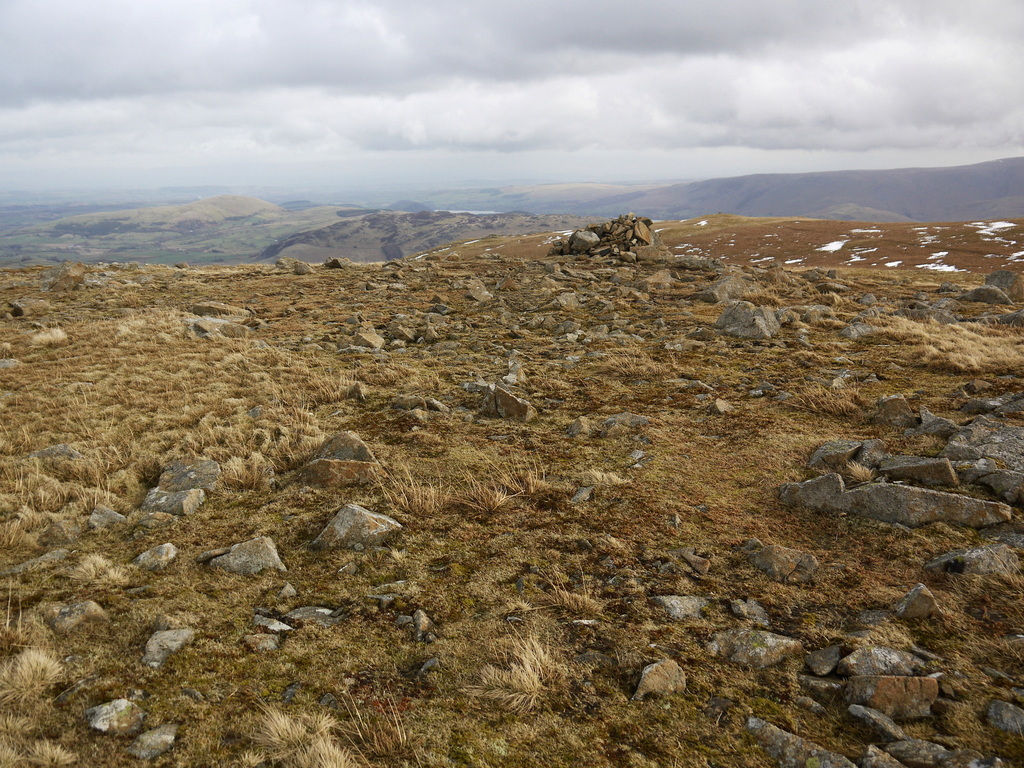
The summit of Hart Side

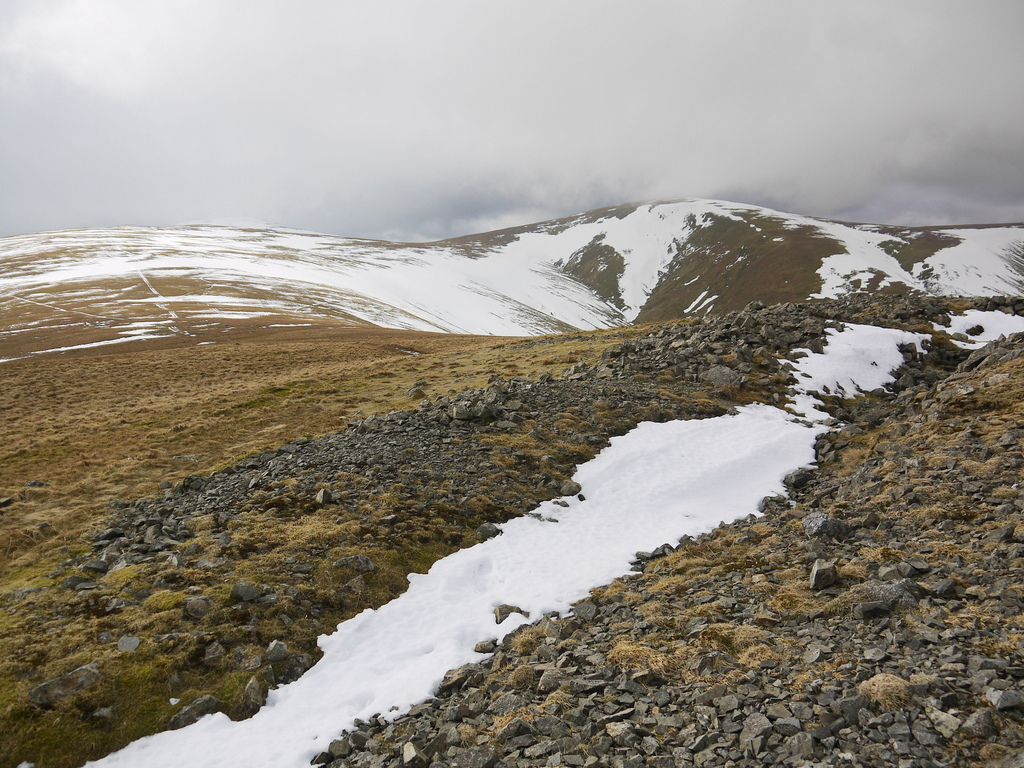
The prospecting trench on the summit of Hart Side, partly filled with snow, with Green Side and Stybarrow Dodd in the distance

Video from the summit

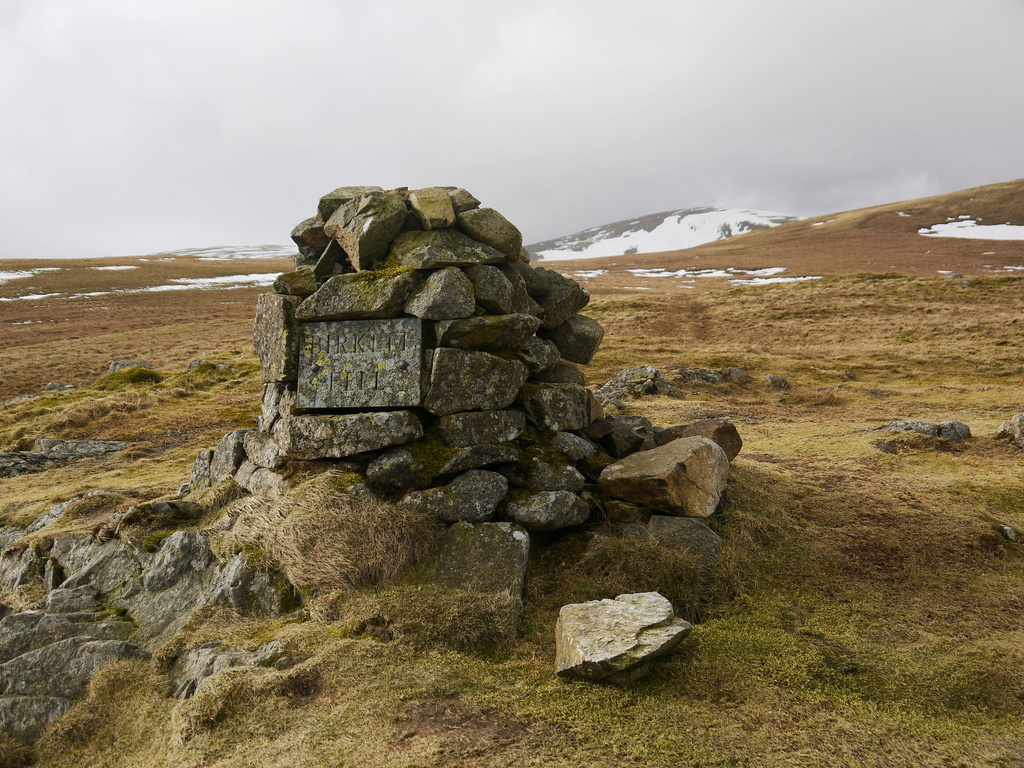
The cairn on Birkett Fell with Stybarrow Dodd beyond

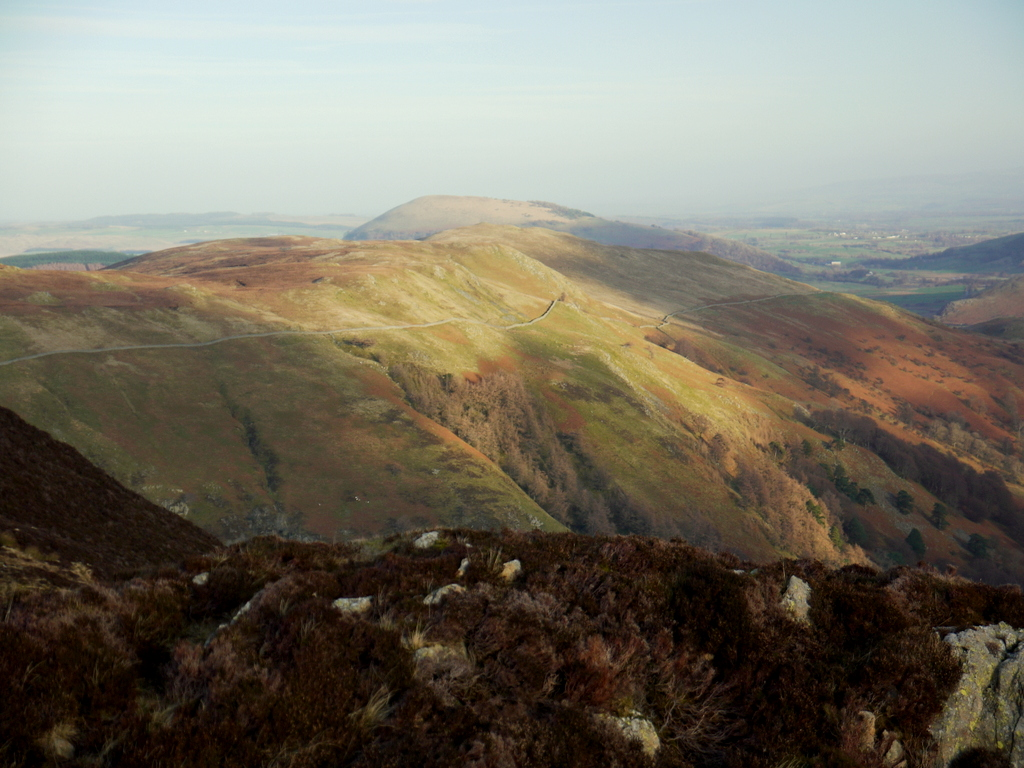
Watermillock Common seen from Heron Pike

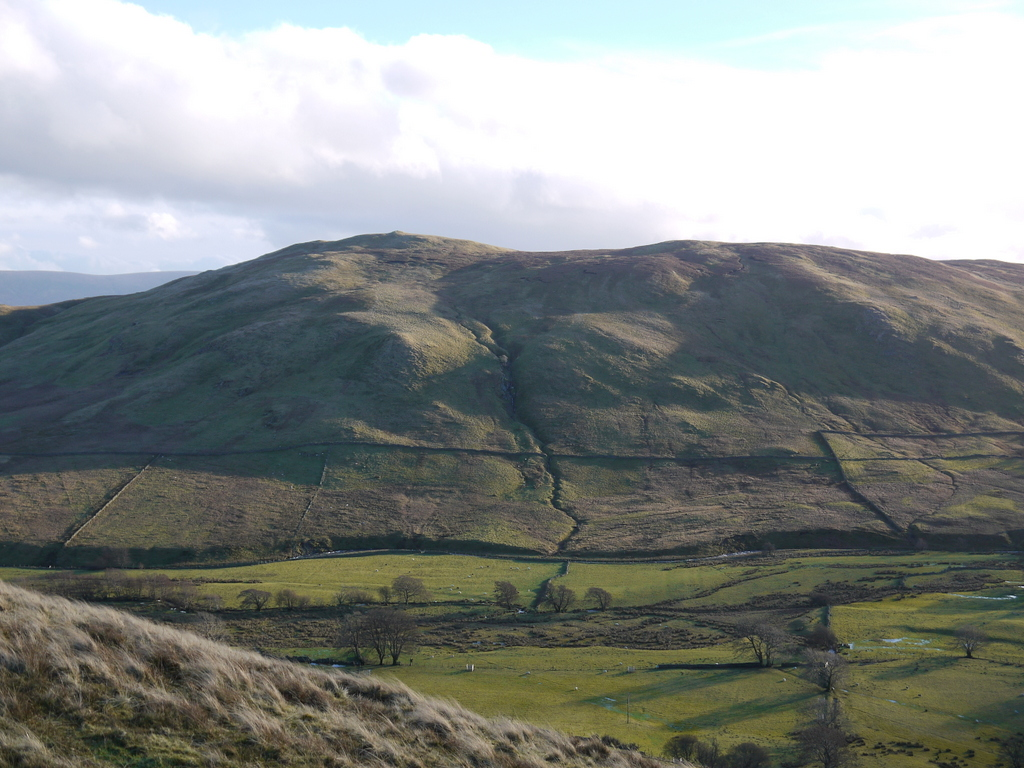
Watermillock Common seen from the north, across the valley of Aira Beck

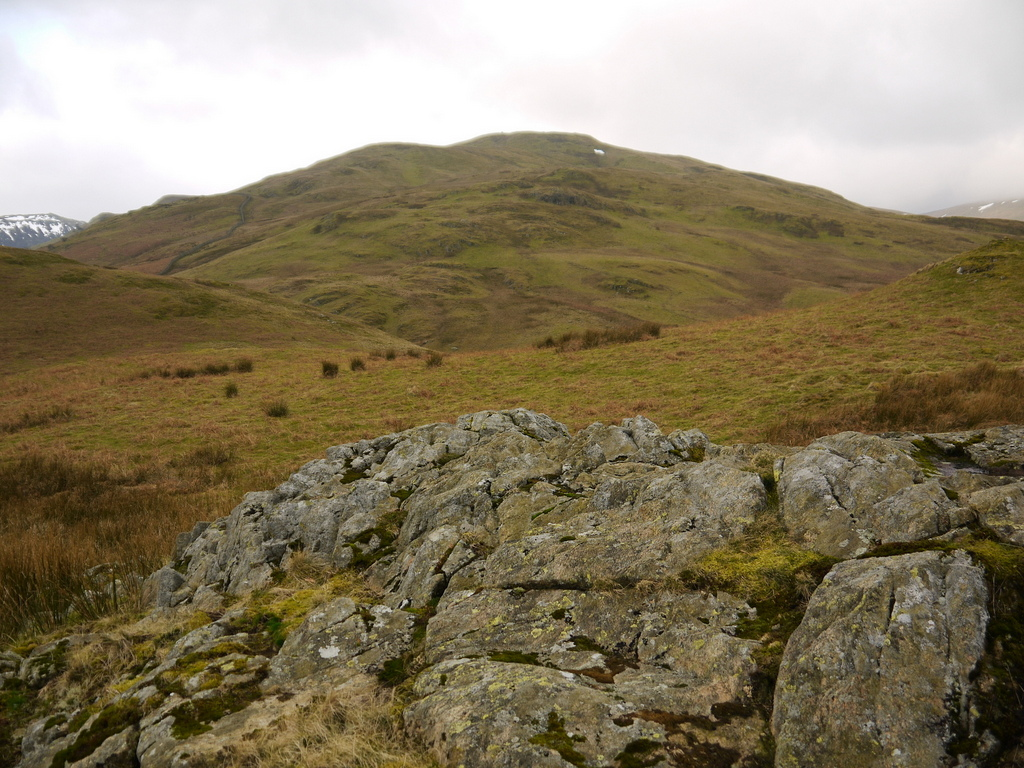
Common Fell on Watermillock Common, seen from Bracken How

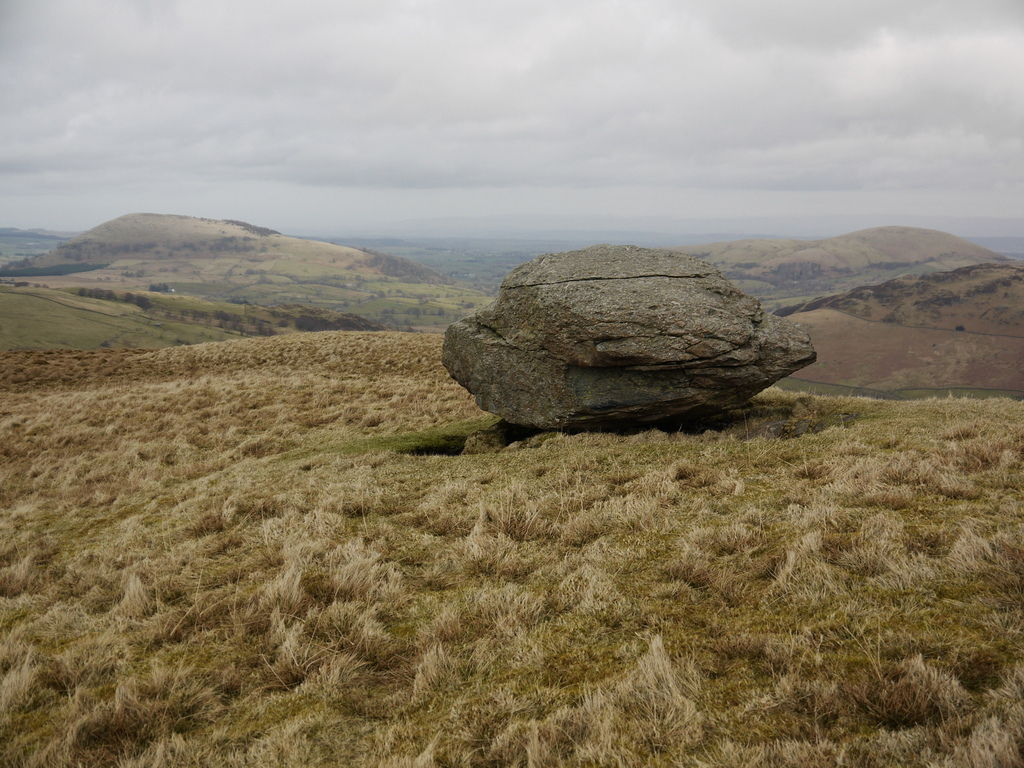
Glacial erratic boulder on Common Fell

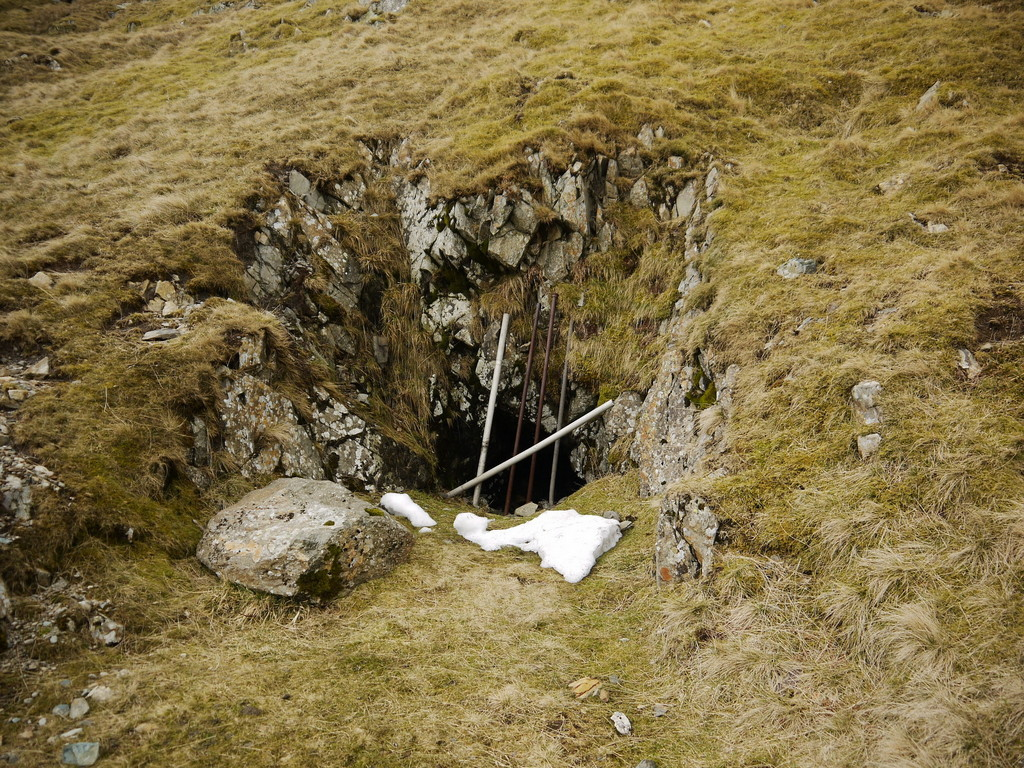
Emergency exit from the Greenside Mine in Glencoyne
