= Stybarrow Dodd =

Fell in the Lake District, Cumbria, England

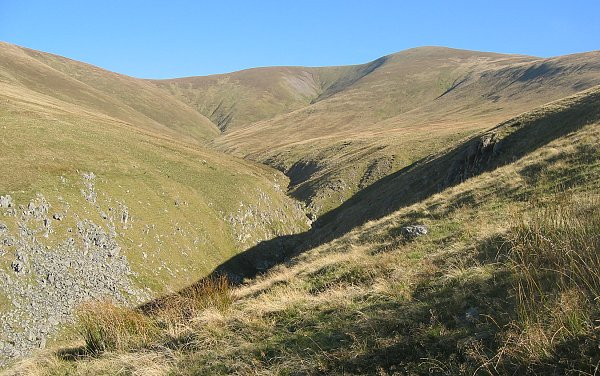
- Stybarrow Dodd and the ravine of Stanah Gill on its western slopes

Highest point
- Elevation: 843 m (2,766 ft)
- Prominence: 68 m (223 ft)
- Parent peak: Great Dodd
- Listing: Hewitt, Wainwright
- Coordinates: 54°33′40″N 3°01′03″W

Geography
- Location within the Lake District
- Location: Cumbria, England
- Parent range: Lake District, Eastern Fells
- OS grid: NY343189
- Topo map: OS Landranger 90, Explorer OL5

Stybarrow Dodd (the hill of the steep path) is a mountain or fell in the English Lake District. It stands immediately north of Sticks Pass on the main ridge of the Helvellyn range in the Eastern Fells, which is situated between the lakes of Thirlmere and the Ullswater.

The summit of Stybarrow Dodd is a smooth, rounded, grassy dome, like those of its two northern neighbours, Watson's Dodd and Great Dodd. Together, these three rather similar fells are sometimes called ‘The Three Dodds’. All three are covered by the same sheet of volcanic rock.

== Topography ==
The summit of Stybarrow Dodd stands on the main ridge of the Helvellyn range, immediately north of Sticks Pass. This ridge runs north–south for about 11 kilometres (7 miles) without dropping below 600 metres (2,000 ft). Stybarrow Dodd occupies just over 1 kilometre (2/3 mile) of this length, from Sticks Pass to the col which connects it to Watson's Dodd and Great Dodd. At this point the ridge is the watershed between the Eden river system to the east and the Derwent river system to the west. The fell rises to 843 metres (2,766 ft), standing nearly 100 metres (330 ft) above Sticks Pass and 68 metres (223 ft) above the col to the north. From its smooth, rounded, grassy summit, four shoulders or ridges extend in different directions.

To the west a generally grassy shoulder runs for about 2 kilometres (1 1/4 miles) down into the valley of the How Beck and to the A591 road. This shoulder is sharply defined by the valleys of Stanah Gill to its north and Sticks Gill (West) and Fisherplace Gill to its south. It slopes gently at first to around the 450 m contour and then more steeply into the valley over a number of rocky crags. The bridleway to Sticks Pass rises over this shoulder. This ridge is drained by two gills just mentioned, which are now captured by a water leat and diverted into Thirlmere Reservoir.

The eastern side of Stybarrow Dodd is more complex and sprawling. Its eastern ridge divides into three parts, with the result that the foot of the mountain stretches along Ullswater from Glenridding to Aira Beck, with two intervening valleys. This side is drained by Aira Beck in Deepdale on the north, by Sticks Gill (East) and Glenridding Beck on the south, and by Glencoyne Beck and Mossdale Beck in the two valleys between the ridges. All of these becks flow directly into Ullswater. There is more detail about each of these ridges and their subsidiary tops on the Hart Side and Sheffield Pike pages.

There are also two short spurs to the north of the main summit. To the north-west one spur leads down to the col which connects the fell to Watson's Dodd and Great Dodd. To the north-east a longer spur called Middle Tongue runs 1.5 kilometres (1 mile) down into Deepdale, between Browndale Beck and Aira Beck.

Stybarrow Dodd and its Subsidiary Tops
| Name | Grid Reference | Height | Prominence | Classification (height and prominence) | Classification (authors’ listings) |
| Stybarrow Dodd | NY 34296 18923 | 843 m | 68 m | Hewitt | Wainwright |
| Green Side | NY 35272 18750 | 795 m | 30 m | Hewitt | Birkett |
| Hart Side | NY 35902 19729 | 756 m | 23 m | Nuttall | Wainwright |
| Birkett Fell | NY 36456 19801 | 725 m | 2 m | | Birkett |
| Swineside Knott | NY 37909 19718 | 553 m | 15 m | | Birkett |
| Brown Hills | NY 37758 19410 | 551 m | 11 m | | Birkett |
| Common Fell | NY 38236 20460 | 552 m | 18 m | | Birkett |
| Round How | NY 39181 20817 | 387 m | 26 m | | Birkett |
| Bracken How | NY 39293 21056 | 373 m | 21 m | | Birkett |
| Sheffield Pike | NY 36911 18181 | 675 m | 91 m | Hewitt | Wainwright |
| Glenridding Dodd | NY 38052 17557 | 442 m | 45 m | | Wainwright |

== Sticks Pass ==
Sticks Pass, to the south of Stybarrow Dodd, crosses the Helvellyn ridge at a height of about 745 metres (2,444 ft), the highest pass in the Lake District crossed by a bridleway. Now used only by fellwalkers, it once provided a regular connection between the communities on either side of the Helvellyn range. The becks flowing to either side of the pass are both named Sticks Gill on Ordnance Survey maps. Alfred Wainwright first added the terms East and West to distinguish them

The route to the pass starts from Stanah in the west and rises over the west ridge of Stybarrow Dodd. It remains to the north of both Sticks Gills, so that most of its length is carried by Stybarrow Dodd. In 1928 the route was still marked by a number of sticks, from which it was supposed that the pass had been named. By the 1950s these sticks had vanished.

== Summit ==
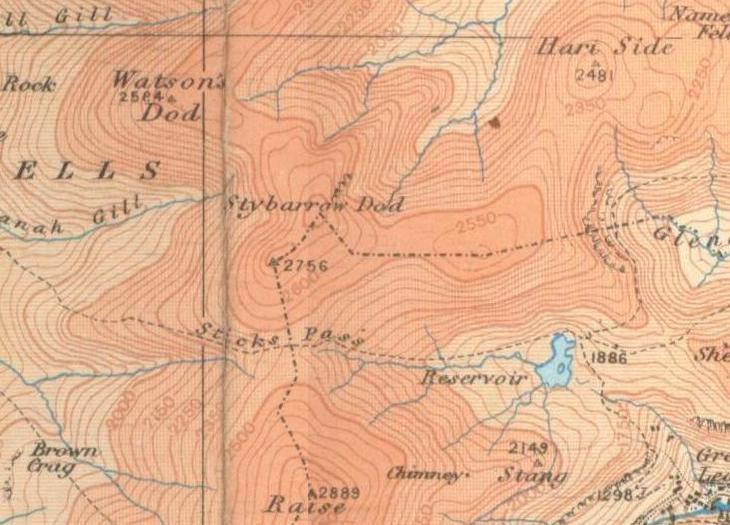
1925 map of the summit area of Stybarrow Dodd and surrounding features

There is a short grassy summit ridge with a separate top and a small cairn at each end. The path lead to the south-western top but the highest point is 300 metres (1,000 ft) to the north-east, a quiet place, out of sight of the ridge path which passes it lower down. It is marked by a small cairn which incorporates an upright piece of slate. Further to the north-east are an occasional pool and the fallen remains of a wall Wainwright saw a ‘very loose estate-boundary iron post’, which is no longer present. It may well have been another like the ones found on Sheffield Pike. The only exposed rock is Deepdale Crag, just east of the fallen wall, though this is ‘hardly more than a short stony slope’.

The south-western summit is only three metres (10 ft) lower, but lies on the ridge path, and is marked by a small cairn. In the 1950s it was this point that sported the upright piece of slate, and whose height was recorded on the Ordnance Survey map, as 2,756 feet (840 m).

Although the north-east top gives an extensive all-round panorama of Lakeland fells, the gentle rounded top of the fell occupies all the foreground. The lower south-west top offers almost as wide a view but without the flat foreground.

== Ascents ==
The whole of the fell, above the intake walls (walls surrounding the land ‘taken in’ to agricultural enclosures) to both east and west, is Open Access land. Much of the eastern side is owned by the National Trust.

From the west there is access to the fell from Stanah on the bridleway to Sticks Pass. From the east, ascents can be made from Glenridding, via Greenside Road and the Sticks Pass bridleway, or via the Sheffield Pike and Green Side ridge. From the north-east ascents can begin from Dockray or High Row, either along the Hart Side ridge or through the rather wet valley of Deepdale.

The summit of Stybarrow Dodd may also be reached from the path along the Helvellyn ridge. A popular walk known as ‘The Dodds’ combines the three summits of Stybarrow Dodd, Watson's Dodd and Great Dodd, often involving a circuit of Deepdale from High Row or Dockray.

== Geology ==
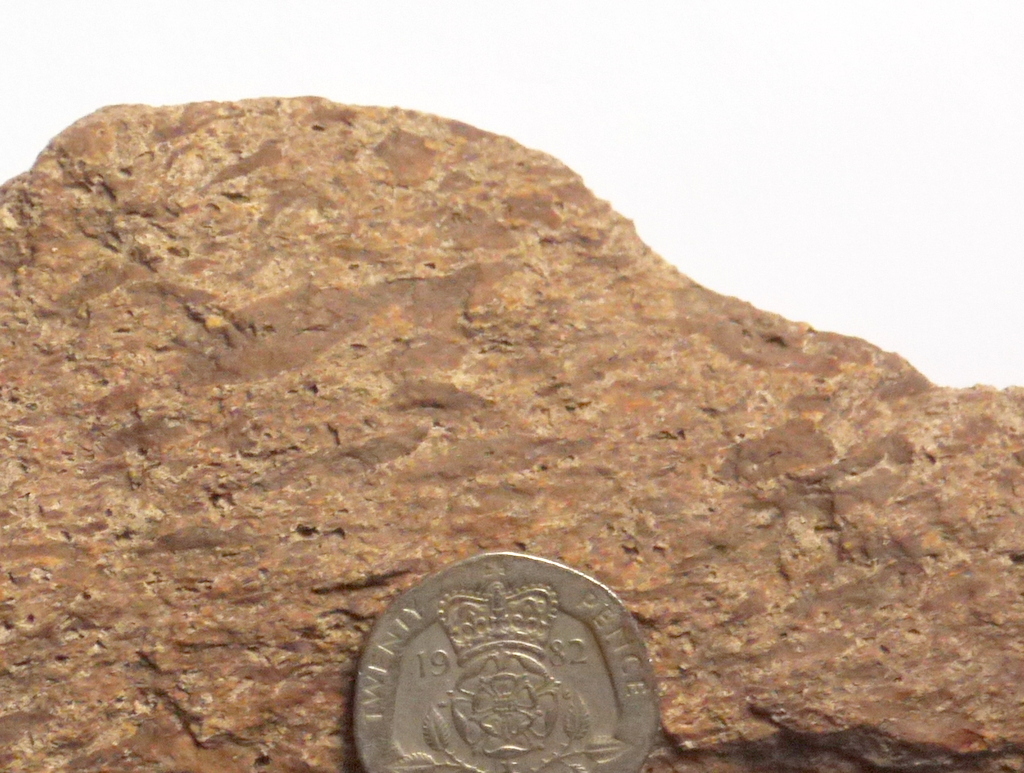
A piece of welded ignimbrite of the Thirlmere Tuff Member, showing flattened lapilli - found on the path between Great Dodd and Stybarrow Dodd

The rocks of Stybarrow Dodd are all part of the Borrowdale Volcanic Group (BVG), formed on the margin of an ancient continent during a period of intense volcanic activity, roughly 450 million years ago in the Ordovician Period.

Within that group, the bulk of the rocks forming the fell and its ridges belong to the Birker Fell Andesite Formation. These rocks are among the earliest of the volcanic rocks of the BVG, and are part of a thick succession of andesite sheets which now outcrop in a wide band around the western and northern sides of the Lake District. These sheets were formed by successive eruptions of mobile andesitic lava from shallow-sided volcanoes. The composition of the erupting magma varied from time to time, with basaltic andesite occurring in a number of places. Individual lava flows may be separated by beds of volcaniclastic sandstone, sedimentary deposits formed from the erosion of the volcanic rocks.

The geological map shows basaltic andesite near Fisher Place, low on the west ridge of Stybarrow Dodd, as well as small amounts of volcaniclastic deposits on the same ridge.

After the eruptions of the Birker Fell Formation the composition of the erupting magma changed from andesitic to dacitic, and as a result the nature of the volcanism became more explosive. A large caldera volcano was built in the area where Scafell and the Langdale Pikes stand today. The caldera was at least 15 kilometres (9.3 miles) across, and as the caldera collapsed, much more than 400 cubic kilometres (96 cubic miles) of magma were erupted. At the close of this volcanic activity, the caldera was filled with sedimentary deposits, represented today by the Seathwaite Fell Sandstone Formation, a sequence of bedded volcaniclastic sandstone and siltstone strata. However, deposition was not confined to the old caldera, and to the east of Thirlmere this formation rests directly on the Birker Fell andesites.

On the west ridge of Stybarrow Dodd, the geological map shows a thin deposit of the Seathwaite Fell Sandstone around the 700 m contour.

Another caldera volcano then formed in a new area. In the area to the north of Sticks Pass, the Birker Fell andesites (and the small area of Seathwaite Fell Sandstone) are overlain by the Lincomb Tarns Tuff Formation. This formation is one of the most widespread of the volcanic rocks of the Lake District; it seems that the whole district was buried beneath at least 150 metres (490 ft) of densely welded ignimbrite, a rock formed from a pyroclastic flow of very hot gas and rock. This formation must represent a series of eruptions of truly exceptional magnitude, accompanying the formation of a volcanic caldera, probably in the area around what is now Helvellyn.

On Stybarrow Dodd this formation is represented by rocks of the Thirlmere Tuff Member, which covers the top of the fell with a thick sheet of welded rhyo-dacitic lapilli tuff in which the individual pieces of semi-molten lava were flattened under the weight of deposits above them. This rock weathers to a white or pink colour, but it is covered by the smooth grassy turf characteristic of Great Dodd, Watson's Dodd and Stybarrow Dodd, all of which are covered by the same sheet.

== Names ==
Stybarrow Dodd. Dodd seems to have been a later addition to the fell's name, which was recorded as Stibarro (1589), Stybrow (1794) and Stybarrow (as late as 1800), although Stiveray Dod is also found from about 1692. Probably 'hill of the steep-path,’ named after the path over Sticks Pass on its flanks, from the dialect word sty(e) ‘a steep path’ and berg (which often becomes barrow in place-names) from either the Old English berg, ‘a hill’ or Old Norse berg ‘a mountain.’

Dod or dodd is a dialect word of unknown origin, but common in hill names in the Lake District and the Scottish Borders for bare rounded summits, either free standing or subsidiary shoulders to higher neighbours.

== Image gallery ==
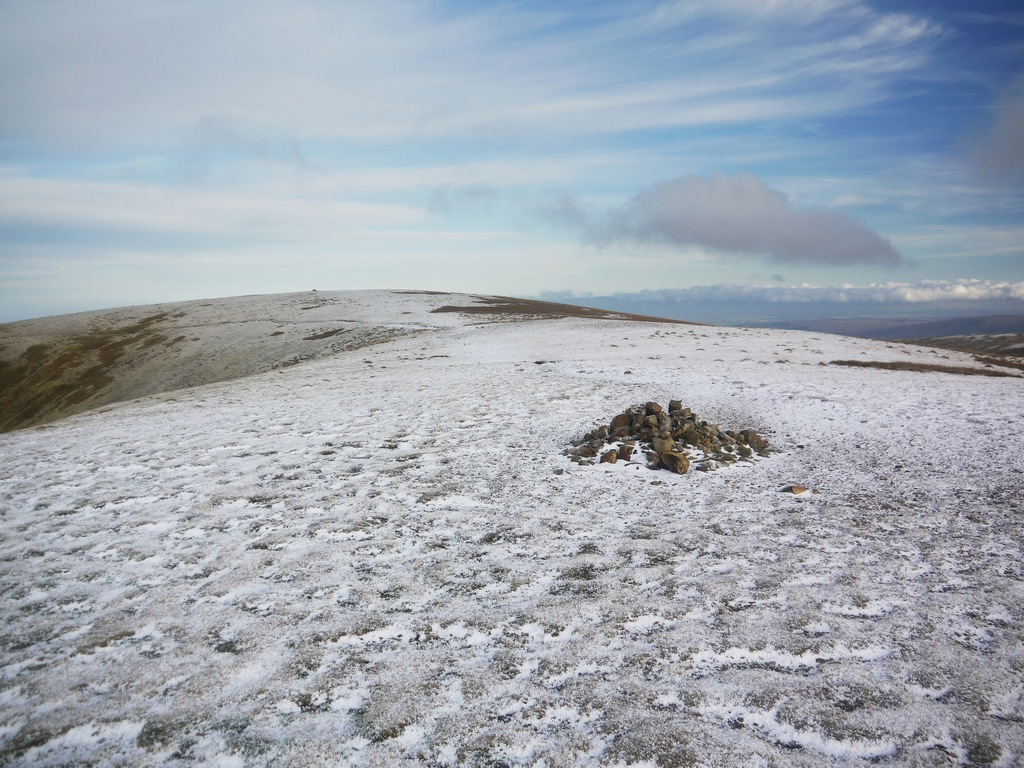
Looking along the summit ridge, from the cairn on the south top. The north top is on the skyline

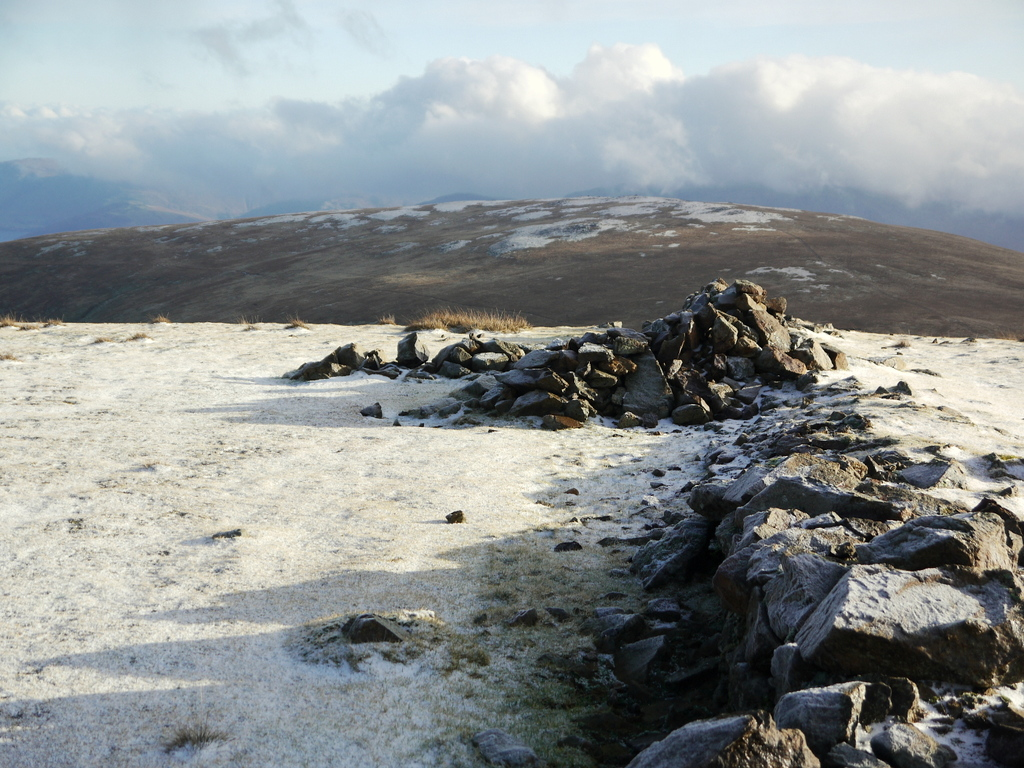
Broken-down wall on the summit of Stybarrow Dodd

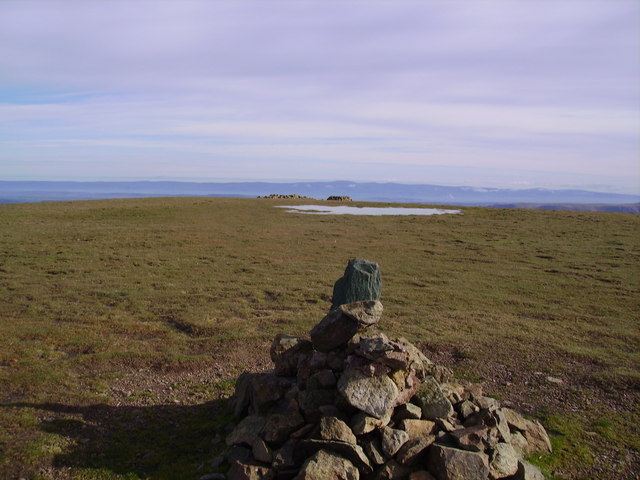
Cairn on the north top of Stybarrow Dodd incorporating the slate marker. Beyond is the intermittent pool, and the remains of the wall

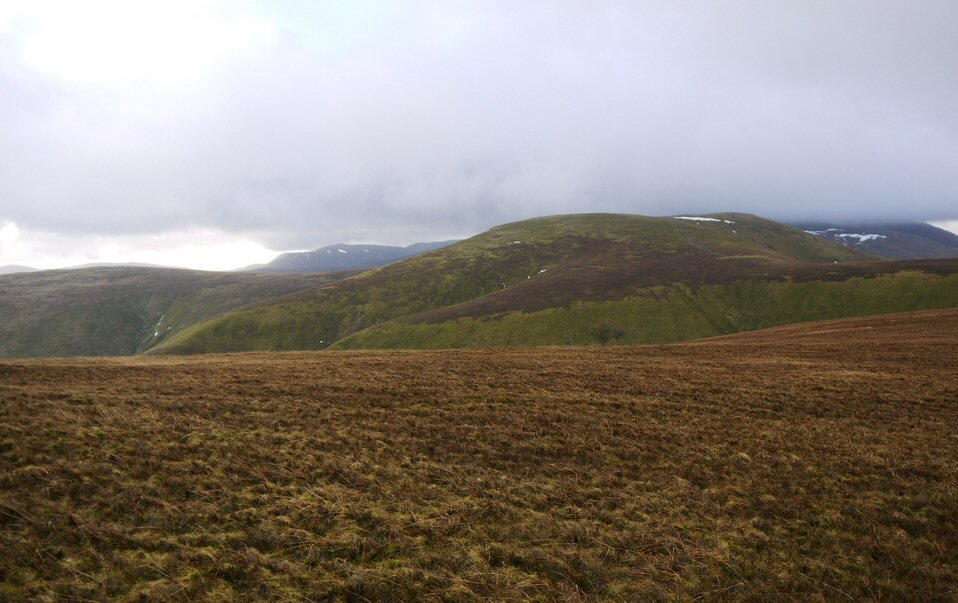
Stybarrow Dodd, seen from Great Dodd, with Green Side to the left
