= Glenridding Dodd =

Fell in the English Lake District

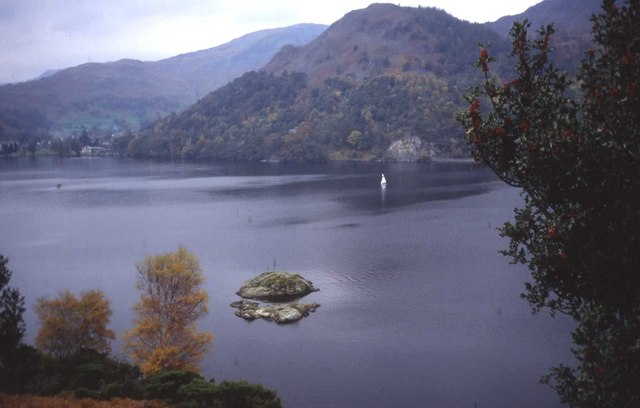
- Glenridding Dodd, seen from the other side of Ullswater, showing Stybarrow Crag by the shore

Highest point
- Elevation: 442 m (1,450 ft)
- Prominence: 45 m (148 ft)
- Parent peak: Sheffield Pike
- Listing: Wainwright
- Coordinates: 54°32′56″N 2°57′30″W

Geography
- Location within the Lake District
- Location: Cumbria, England
- Parent range: Lake District, Eastern Fells
- OS grid: NY381175
- Topo map: OS Explorer OL5

Glenridding Dodd (the rounded hill above Glenridding) is a small fell in the English Lake District, at the end of a ridge descending from the Helvellyn range in the Eastern Fells. It stands above the village of Glenridding and on the western shore of Ullswater. Although small and not of great elevation, its top is a fine viewpoint for Ullswater and for the fells clustered round the valleys above Patterdale.

== Topography ==
Glenridding Dodd is the final subsidiary top on the east ridge of Stybarrow Dodd. It takes the form of a short east-west ridge above the village of Glenridding. To the east the ridge falls steeply and terminates in the precipitous rock face of Stybarrow Crag beside the A592 road on the shore of Ullswater. To the west a col separates it from the south-east ridge of Sheffield Pike. To the north it is bounded by Mossdale Beck, and to the south by the village of Glenridding, and Glenridding Beck. The lower slopes on the south and east sides are wooded with deciduous trees (the Stybarrow Oaks), and on the north side larch trees reach almost to the summit

Glenridding Dodd is a small fell measuring only 1 km in length and less than that in width, and its highest point rises to only 442 m. Yet it is a fine viewpoint over Ullswater, nearly 300 m below.

== Summit ==
The top of Glenridding Dodd is a short ridge, with patches of heather, rocky knolls and marshy hollows. The highest point, at the western end, is marked by a small cairn, but better views of Glenridding and almost the whole of Ullswater may be had from the eastern end of the ridge where the ground falls steeply away, just above the 400 m contour. For a low fell the view is "delightful." Beyond Glenridding are the claw-shaped end of Birkhouse Moor, and Keldas, its subsidiary top closer to the lake. Further south, the fells clustered around the valleys above Patterdale are seen.

A stone boundary marker, just west of the summit, is inscribed with the letters M (on the side facing Glenridding) and H (on the side facing Glencoyne). This marked the boundary between the lands of the Marshall family of Patterdale and the Howard family of Greystoke.

== Ascents ==
Much of the land above the village of Glenridding, including the Stybarrow Oaks, is privately owned, but above the wall the fell is Open Access land.

Ascents can begin from Glenridding, with its large pay-and-display car park, up the path known as The Rake, or from the lay-by on the A592 road immediately north of Stybarrow Crag, beside Mossdale Beck. Both paths meet at the wall across the col to the west of the summit. A short climb from here leads to the summit.

Alfred Wainwright noted that it had once been a much more popular ascent for the sake of its views, but that old paths had become overgrown and neglected in his day.

== Geology ==
The rocks of Glenridding Dodd are all part of the Borrowdale Volcanic Group, formed on the margin of an ancient continent during a period of intense volcanic activity, roughly 450 million years ago in the Ordovician Period.

All the rocks on the fell belong to the Birker Fell Andesite Formation. This was formed predominantly by eruptions of mobile andesitic lava from shallow-sided volcanoes. These rocks are part of a thick succession of lava sheets found around the western and northern sides of the Lake District.

Among these andesitic lavas were some small quantities of dacitic lavas, formed when more viscous (more silica-rich) magma was erupted. Such dacitic rock is found on the lower parts of the southern and eastern slopes of the fell (but not including Stybarrow Crag).

== Names ==
The name Glenridding Dodd is recorded from 1823 onwards. Glenridding is probably 'the valley full of bracken', from Cumbric glinn (or possibly Irish Gaelic gleann), 'glen, valley' and the Cumbric equivalent of the Welsh rhedyn, 'fern, bracken.' Dod or dodd is a dialect word of unknown origin, but common in hill names in the Lake District and the Scottish Borders for bare rounded summits, either free standing or subsidiary shoulders to higher neighbours.

Mossdale is 'boggy valley' from the dialect word moss (from Old Norse mosi or Old English mos), 'bog', and the dialect word dale (from Old Norse dalr), 'valley.'

The Rake is 'the track' from the dialect word rake, 'track.' This is used elsewhere in the Lake District for a narrow path on a hill.

Bleas Crag may be 'the dark crag' from the dialect work blea (from Old Norse blár), 'dark,' plus crag.

== Image gallery ==
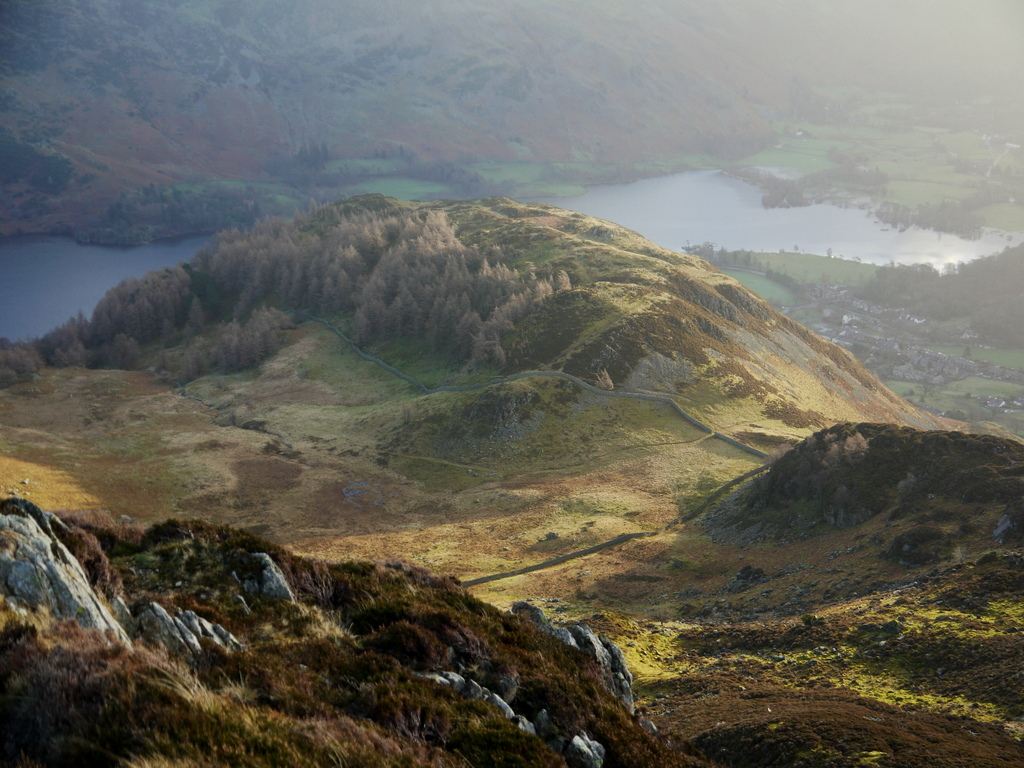
Looking down onto Glenridding Dodd from the summit of Heron Pike

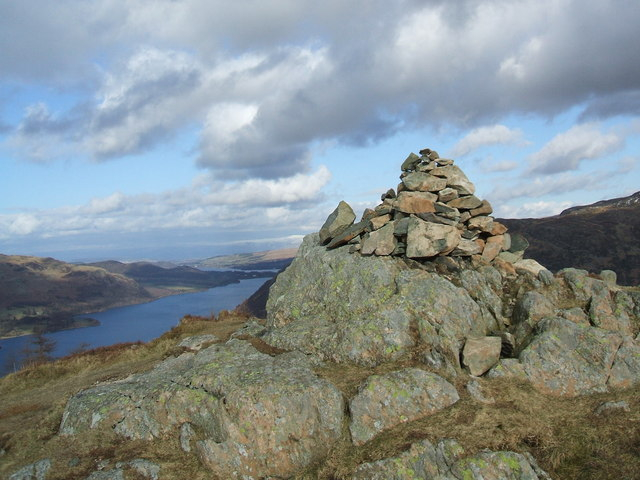
Cairn on the summit of Glenridding Dodd

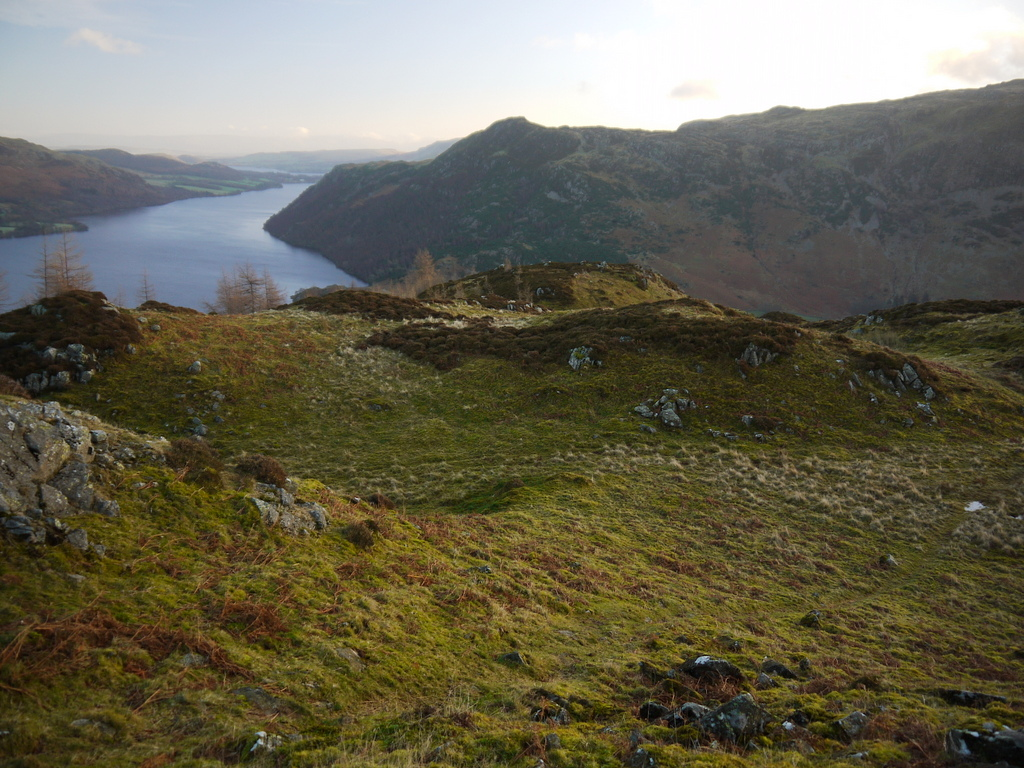
Rocky knolls on the summit ridge of Glenridding Dodd

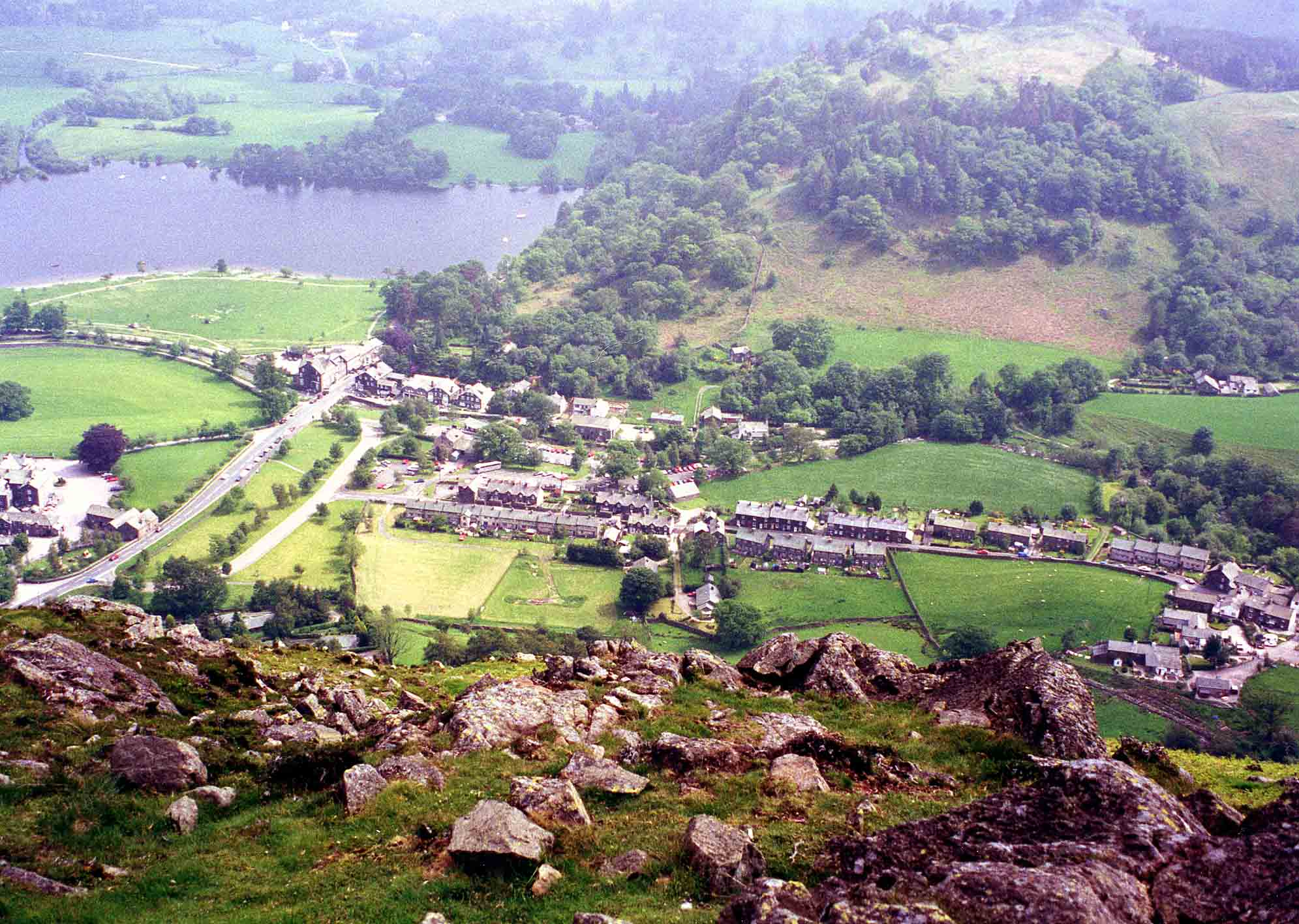
Looking down onto Glenridding village from the summit
