= Great Dodd =

Mountain in the English Lake District, Cumbria, England

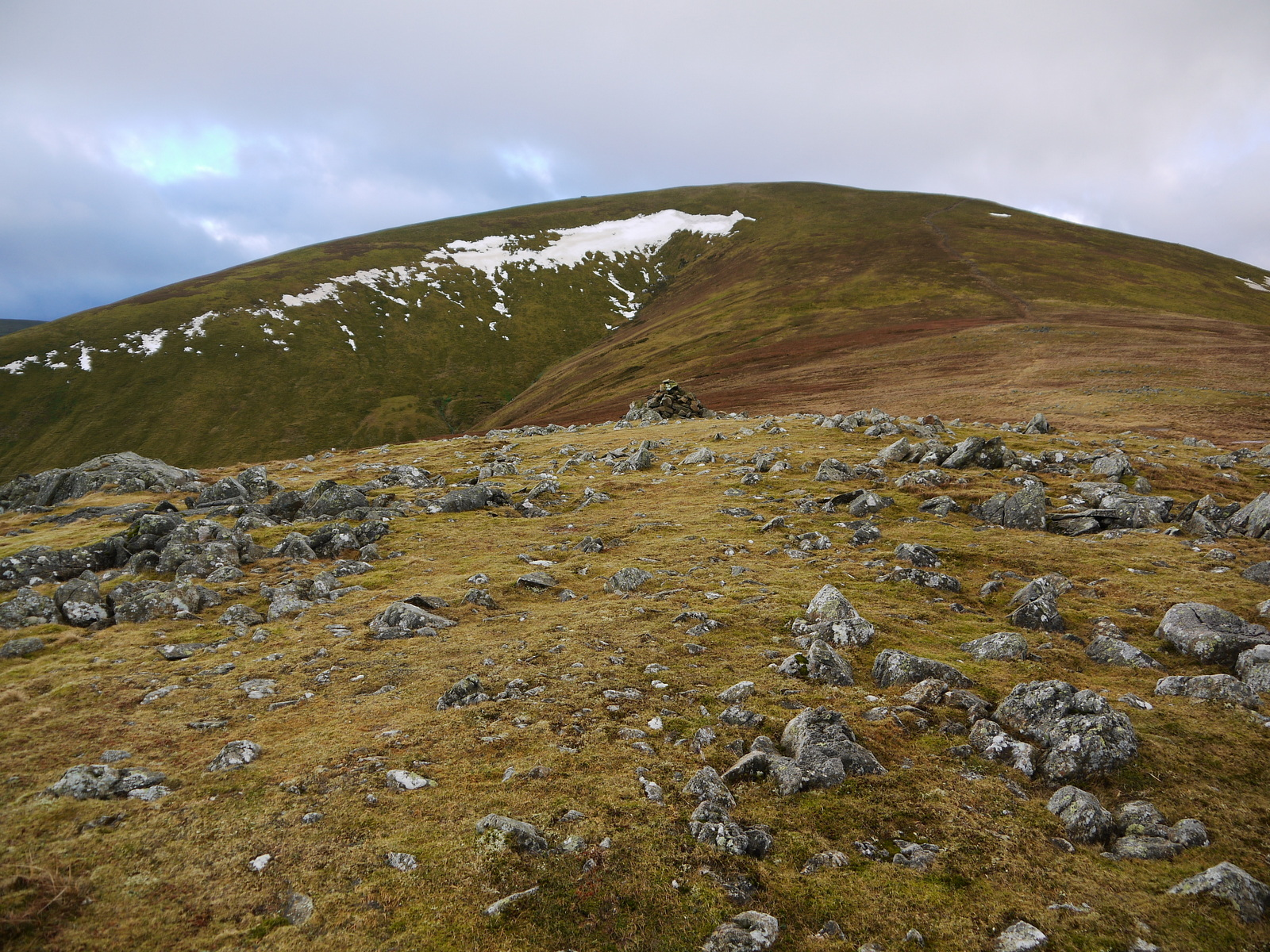
- The summit dome of Great Dodd, seen from Randerside

Highest point
- Elevation: 857 m (2,812 ft)
- Prominence: 109 m (358 ft)
- Parent peak: Helvellyn
- Listing: HuMP, Hewitt
- Coordinates: 54°34′31″N 3°01′10″W

Geography
- Location within the Lake District
- Location: Cumbria, England
- Parent range: Lake District, Eastern Fells
- OS grid: NY342205
- Topo map: OS Explorer OL5, Landranger 90

Great Dodd (meaning: big round hill) is a mountain or fell in the English Lake District. It stands on the main ridge of the Helvellyn range, a line of mountains which runs in a north–south direction between the lakes of Thirlmere and Ullswater in the east of the Lake District. Great Dodd, with a height of 857 metres (2,812 ft) is the highest of the fells in this range to the north of Sticks Pass.

Walkers may approach Great Dodd from either High Row near Dockray to the east, or from Legburthwaite to the west – or along the main ridge track from either north or south. Scramblers with climbing skills may be attracted to three gill climbs on the western side of the mountain.

The summit of Great Dodd is a smooth, grassy, rounded dome, like its two southern neighbours, Watson's Dodd and Stybarrow Dodd. Together, these three are sometimes called ‘The Three Dodds’. These three are made of volcanic rocks of the Borrowdale Volcanic Group, and the tops of all three are covered by the same sheet of rock, which was formed in a series of huge volcanic explosions accompanying the formation of a volcanic caldera about 450 million years ago.

Two attempts were made to mine mineral veins in the rocks of Great Dodd, but neither attempt was successful.

== Topography ==
Three ridges lead from the rounded summit of Great Dodd.

The west ridge leads over the shoulder called Little Dodd, and then turns north-west to the rocky pinnacle of Calfhow Pike and to the col separating Great Dodd from Clough Head. Calfhow Pike would have little significance in more rugged areas of the Lake District, but here in the midst of smooth green slopes it is a conspicuous landmark visible for miles around. Although it has little prominence, it is a pleasant top giving good views of the surrounding grassy slopes and the valleys below.

A short south-west ridge leads to Watson's Dodd, where it merges with the north-west ridge of Stybarrow Dodd to drop into the valley at Legburthwaite.

To the north-east a long ridge leads to the subsidiary stony top of Randerside (729 metres; 2,392 ft). From there it broadens into Matterdale Common, becoming steadily wetter underfoot, before splitting into two on either side of Groove Beck. The more southerly ridge heads over High Brow (575 metres; 1,886 ft), fringed by Dowthwaite Crag which broods over the road-end settlement of Dowthwaitehead. The further tops of Low How (497 metres; 1,631 ft) and Cockley Moor (455 metres; 1,493 ft) are passed before this branch of the ridge peters out in extensive conifer plantations, and then the ground climbs again to Great Mell Fell. The northern branch of the ridge is edged by Wolf Crags above the Old Coach Road, beyond which a wide grassy moor sweeps north across Sandbeds Moss and Flaska to the A66 road and the dismantled Penrith to Keswick railway.

Great Dodd stands on the watershed between the Eden river system to the east and the Derwent river system to the west.

Its western slopes used to drain into St John's Beck, a tributary of the River Greta, which in turn joins the River Derwent at Keswick. When Thirlmere Reservoir was constructed in the late 19th century, two of Great Dodd's western streams, Ladknott Gill and Mill Gill, were captured by a water leat and diverted into the new reservoir.

The northern slopes of Great Dodd drain either into Mosedale and Mosedale Beck or into Trout Beck. These also flow into the River Greta (via the River Glenderamackin) and then to the Derwent.

However, the eastern and southern slopes of Great Dodd drain into Deepdale and Aira Beck, which flows into Ullswater. The lake drains into the River Eamont, which then joins the River Eden near Penrith.

The beck in Deepdale undergoes a number of name changes. Beginning as Browndale Beck as it flows through the hanging valley of Deepdale, it becomes Rush Gill as it drops to Dowthwaitehead, and is then called Aira Beck. This is the head stream for the famous waterfall of Aira Force, a popular tourist sight.

Similarly, Groove Beck, which rises on Matterdale Common, the north-east ridge of Great Dodd, becomes Thornsgill Beck and then Trout Beck, before joining the River Glenderamackin.

There are no tarns on Great Dodd, and very few exposures of rock. Small crags do line the lower western slopes above St John's in the Vale. Lad Knott is the most prominent of these, and the deep ravine of Mill Gill also exposes the rock. On the north-east ridge Randerside, Wolf Crags and Dowthwaite Crag all display the rocks.

Great Dodd and its Subsidiary Tops
Name	Grid Reference	Height	Prominence	Classification (height and prominence)	Classification (authors’ listings)
Great Dodd	NY 34203 20528	857 m	109 m	HuMP, Hewitt	Wainwright, Birkett
Little Dodd	NY 33804 20420	785 m	0 m		Birkett
Calfhow Pike	NY 33073 21133	660 m	9 m		Birkett
Randerside	NY 34870 21062	729 m	9 m		Birkett
High Brow	NY 36777 21406	575 m	24 m		Birkett
Low How	NY 37445 21515	497 m	18 m		Birkett
Cockley Moor	NY 38123 22525	455 m	38 m		
Unnamed top	NY 36400 22200	541 m	17 m		Birkett

== Routes ==
Nearly all of Great Dodd (above the intake walls in the valleys) is Open Access land. The north-east ridge is part of Matterdale Common, owned by the National Trust.

Ascents of Great Dodd can begin either from Legburthwaite to the west, or from High Row (near Dockray) to the east. Parking is available at both places.

From Legburthwaite several routes are possible. A path above the ravine of Mill Gill, on its north side, leads to the cairn on Little Dodd. Ladknott Gill can be followed upwards. Or the old shepherds’ path leads from above Fornside to Calfhow Pike. There is no public access to this from Fornside, but it can be reached by following the intake wall north from Mill Gill.

For scramblers with climbing skills and a rope, three gills on the west side of Great Dodd are accessible: Mill Gill, Beckthorns Gill and the deeply recessed Sandbed Gill. Walkers should keep out of the gills themselves.

From High Row the direct route leads up the north-east ridge, over Low How, High Brow and Randerside. Alternative routes begin by following the Old Coach Road, either to the path alongside Groove Beck and up Randerside, or into Mosedale from near the Mariel Bridge and up to Calfhow Pike. This unsurfaced road provides a fine walking route from Dockray around the northern end of the Helvellyn range to the Vale of St John. The close up view of Wolf Crags is particularly good.

Great Dodd may also be included in a circular walk around Deepdale known as The Dodds. Or it may be included in a ridge walk, along the main Helvellyn ridge. The ridge path in either direction is broad and clear, with a shortcut contouring to the west of Great Dodd's summit which suggests that many ridge walkers bypass the summit.

== Summit ==
The summit area of Great Dodd is a short rounded ridge, covered with grass but with many stones lying among it, and with the highest point at the north-west end where there is a cairn. This was not present in 1955 when Alfred Wainwright published his Pictorial Guide. The original cairn is a substantial affair, about 100 metres (330 ft) south of the highest point, and it incorporates a wind shelter.

Confusingly, the Ordnance Survey 1:50,000 scale Landranger map gives a spot height of 856 m at the south-eastern shelter cairn, while the 1:25,000 Explorer map gives a height of 857 m at the north-eastern cairn.

There is a good view all round, though this lacks foreground when seen from the summit because of the gently rounded nature of the fell. Better views may be had by walking a short distance from the summit in any direction. Much of the Lake District, the hills of south-west Scotland, the Eden Valley and the Pennine Hills may be seen on a clear day.

Another small cairn lies part way down the western slope on the path to Clough Head, marking the minor top of Little Dodd.

== Geology ==
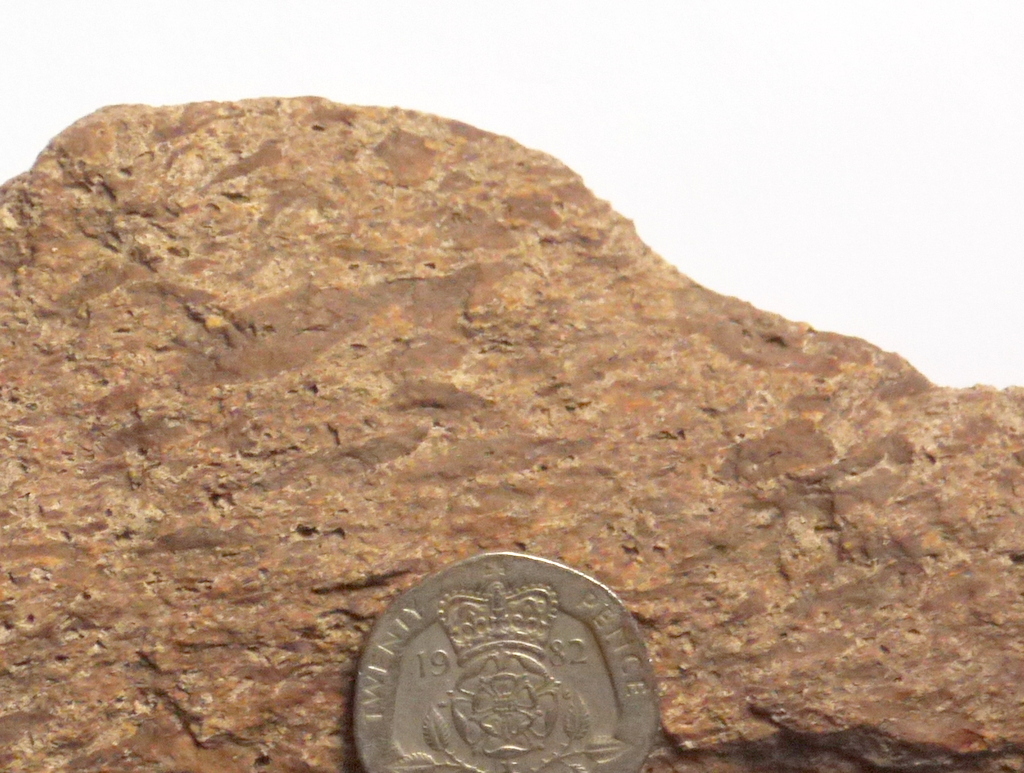
A piece of welded ignimbrite of the Thirlmere Tuff Member, showing flattened lapilli — found on the path between Great Dodd and Stybarrow Dodd

The rocks of Great Dodd are all part of the Borrowdale Volcanic Group, formed on the margin of an ancient continent during a period of intense volcanic activity, roughly 450 million years ago in the Ordovician Period.

Within that Group, the bulk of the rocks forming the fell belong to the Birker Fell Andesite Formation. These rocks are among the earliest of the volcanic rocks of the Borrowdale Volcanic Group, and are part of a thick succession of andesite sheets which now outcrop in a wide band around the western and northern sides of the Lake District, and probably underlie much of the other volcanic rocks. These sheets were formed by successive eruptions of mobile andesitic lava from shallow-sided volcanoes. The composition of the erupting magma varied from time to time, with domes of more viscous dacite occurring in a number of places. Calfhow Pike, Randerside and High Brow are all shown as dacite on the geological map.

Individual lava flows may be separated by beds of volcaniclastic sandstone, sedimentary deposits formed from the erosion of the volcanic rocks and deposited by streams, floods and possibly wind. The geological map shows a number of areas of volcaniclastic sandstone on the western slopes of Great Dodd, above Beckthorns and Fornside.

After the eruptions of the Birker Fell Formation, the composition of the erupting magma changed from largely andesitic to predominantly dacitic, and as a result the nature of the volcanism became more explosive.

A number of caldera volcanoes were formed. In the area to the north of Sticks Pass the Birker Fell andesites are overlain by the Lincomb Tarns Tuff Formation. This formation is one of the most widespread of the volcanic rocks of the Lake District; it seems that the whole district was buried beneath at least 150 metres (490 ft) of densely welded ignimbrite, a rock formed from a pyroclastic flow of very hot gas and rock. This formation must represent a series of eruptions of truly exceptional magnitude, accompanying the formation of a volcanic caldera probably in the area around what is now Helvellyn.

On Great Dodd this formation is represented by rocks of the Thirlmere Tuff Member, which covers the top of the fell with a thick sheet of welded rhyo-dacitic lapilli tuff in which the individual pieces of semi-molten lava were flattened under the weight of deposits above them. This rock weathers to a white or pink colour, but it is covered by the smooth grassy turf characteristic of Great Dodd, Watson's Dodd and Stybarrow Dodd, all of which are covered by the same sheet.

Towards the end of, or after the cessation of the volcanic activity, a large granite batholith was emplaced beneath the volcanic rocks of the Lake District. Associated with the granite batholith was the creation of numerous mineral veins.

There is evidence of historic mining activity in two locations on Great Dodd in efforts to exploit such mineral veins. Fornside Mine on the western slopes consisted of two levels, one of which shows signs of copper ore, the other was on a barren quartz vein. At the base of Wolf Crags there are the remains of a short level 30 metres (98 ft) long on a poor quartz vein. There are no historical records of this level. It may be assumed that both mines were commercial failures.

== Names ==
Great Dodd may originally have been Dodd Fell, the name shown on Donald's map of 1771 and Ford's map of 1839, though it is not known in pre-18th century sources. It did not need to be distinguished from its neighbours since Stybarrow Dodd seems to have been known in earlier times simply as Stybarrow, and Watson's Dodd is probably only an 18th-century name.

Dod or dodd is a dialect word of unknown origin, but common in hill names in the Lake District and the Scottish Borders for bare rounded summits, either free standing or subsidiary shoulders to higher neighbours.

Calfhow Pike was referred to as Calfhou in a 13th-century source, and pyke of Cauvey in the 16th century. This appears to be ‘the peak of Calf Hill’, from Old English pīc, a peak, and how (from the Old Norse haugr), a hill. The name here probably refers to deer calving.

Randerside was first recorded by the Ordnance Survey in 1867. Without earlier sources it is unclear whether side here simply means ‘hillside’ or comes from an earlier Old Norse sætr, "shieling", or sæti, "seat". A different Randerside in Cumbria was Randolfsete in 1285, "Randolf’s shieling."

== See also ==
- List of hills in the Lake District
- List of fells in the Lake District
