= Loyalty =

Faithfulness or devotion to a person, country, group, or cause

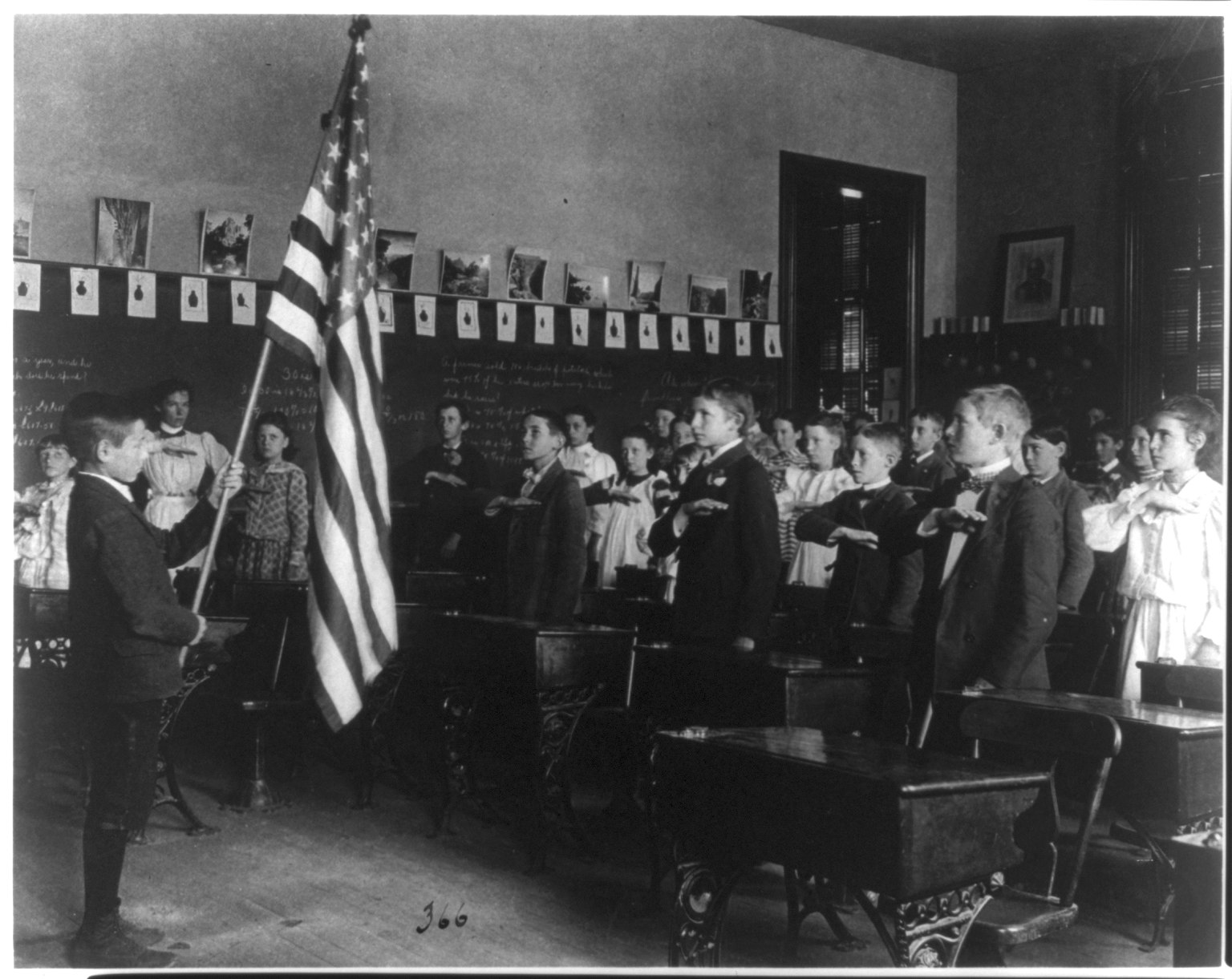
Schoolchildren reciting the Pledge of Allegiance to the United States flag

Loyalty is a devotion to a country, philosophy, group, or person. Philosophers disagree on what can be an object of loyalty as some argue that loyalty is strictly interpersonal and only another human being can be the object of loyalty. The definition of loyalty in law and political science is the fidelity of an individual to a nation, either one's nation of birth, or one's declared home nation by oath (naturalization).

== Historical concepts ==
The Encyclopædia Britannica Eleventh Edition defines loyalty as an "allegiance to the sovereign or established government of one's country" and also "personal devotion and reverence to the sovereign and royal family". It traces the word "loyalty" to the 15th century, noting that then it primarily referred to fidelity in service, in love, or to an oath that one has made. The meaning that the Britannica gives as primary, it attributes to a shift during the 16th century, noting that the origin of the word is in the Old French loialte, that is in turn rooted in the Latin lex, meaning "law". One who is loyal, in the feudal sense of fealty, is one who is lawful (as opposed to an outlaw), who has full legal rights as a consequence of faithful allegiance to a feudal lord. Hence the 1911 Britannica derived its (early 20th century) primary meaning of loyalty to a monarch.

"Loyalty" is the most important and frequently emphasized virtue in Bushido. In combination with six other virtues, which are Righteousness (義 gi), Courage (勇 yū), Benevolence, (仁 jin), Respect (礼 rei), Sincerity (誠 makoto), and Honour (名誉 meiyo), it formed the Bushido code: "It is somehow implanted in their chromosomal makeup to be loyal". In the Gospel of Matthew, Jesus states, "No one can serve two masters; for a slave will either hate the one and love the other, or be devoted to the one and despise the other. You cannot serve God and wealth". On the other hand, the "Render unto Caesar" of the synoptic gospels acknowledges the possibility of distinct loyalties (secular and religious) without conflict, but if loyalty to man conflicts with loyalty to God, the latter takes precedence.

== Modern concepts ==
Josiah Royce presented a different definition of the concept in his 1908 book The Philosophy of Loyalty. According to Royce, loyalty is a virtue, indeed a primary virtue, "the heart of all the virtues, the central duty amongst all the duties". Royce presents loyalty, which he defines at length, as the basic moral principle from which all other principles can be derived. The short definition that he gives of the idea is that loyalty is "the willing and practical and thoroughgoing devotion of a person to a cause". Loyalty is thoroughgoing in that it is not merely a casual interest but a wholehearted commitment to a cause.

Royce's view of loyalty was challenged by John Ladd, professor of philosophy at Brown University, in the article on "Loyalty" in the first edition of the Macmillan Encyclopedia of Philosophy (1967). Ladd observed that by that time the subject had received "scant attention in philosophical literature". This he attributed to "odious" associations that the subject had with nationalism, including Nazism, and with the metaphysics of idealism, which he characterized as "obsolete". However, he argued that such associations were faulty and that the notion of loyalty is "an essential ingredient in any civilized and humane system of morals".

Anthony Ralls observes that Ladd's article is that Encyclopaedia's only article on a virtue, . Ladd asserts that, contrary to Royce, causes to which one is loyal are interpersonal, not impersonal or suprapersonal. He states that Royce's view has "the ethical defect of postulating duties over and above our individual duties to men and groups of men. The individual is submerged and lost in this superperson for its tends to dissolve our specific duties to others into 'superhuman' good". Ronald F. Duska, the Lamont Post Chair of Ethics and the Professions at The American College, extends Ladd's objection, saying that it is a perversion of ethics and virtue for one's self-will to be identified with anything, as Royce would have it. Even if one were identifying one's self-will with God, to be worthy of such loyalty God would have to be the summum bonum, the perfect manifestation of good.

Ladd himself characterizes loyalty as interpersonal, i.e., a relationship between a lord and vassal, parent and child, or two good friends. Duska states that this characterization leads to a problem that Ladd overlooks. Loyalty may certainly be between two persons, but it may also be from a person to a group of people. Examples of this, which are unequivocally considered to be instances of loyalty, are loyalty by a person to his or her family, to a team that he or she is a member or fan of, or to his or her country. The problem is that it then becomes unclear whether there is a strict interpersonal relationship involved, and whether Ladd's contention that loyalty is interpersonal—not suprapersonal—is an adequate description. Ladd considers loyalty from two perspectives: its proper object and its moral value.

John Kleinig, professor of philosophy at City University of New York, observes that over the years the idea has been treated by writers from Aeschylus through John Galsworthy to Joseph Conrad, by psychologists, psychiatrists, sociologists, scholars of religion, political economists, scholars of business and marketing, and—most particularly—by political theorists, who deal with it in terms of loyalty oaths and patriotism. As a philosophical concept, loyalty was largely untreated by philosophers until the work of Josiah Royce, the "grand exception" in Kleinig's words. Kleinig observes that from the 1980s onwards, the subject gained attention, with philosophers variously relating it to professional ethics, whistleblowing, friendship, and virtue theory. Additional aspects enumerated by Kleinig include the exclusionary nature of loyalty and its subjects.

=== Object of loyalty ===
Ladd and others, including Milton R. Konvitz and Marcia W. Baron, disagree about the proper object of loyalty—what it is possible to be loyal to. Ladd considers loyalty to be interpersonal: the object of loyalty is always a person. In the Encyclopaedia of the History of Ideas, Konvitz states that the objects of loyalty encompass principles, causes, ideas, ideals, religions, ideologies, nations, governments, parties, leaders, families, friends, regions, racial groups, and "anyone or anything to which one's heart can become attached or devoted". Baron agrees with Ladd, inasmuch as loyalty is "to certain people or to a group of people, not loyalty to an ideal or cause". She argues in her monograph, The Moral Status of Loyalty, that "[w]hen we speak of causes (or ideals) we are more apt to say that people are committed to them or devoted to them than that they are loyal to them". Kleinig agrees with Baron, noting that a person's earliest and strongest loyalties are almost always to people, and that only later do people arrive at abstract notions like values, causes, and ideals. He disagrees, however, with the notion that loyalties are restricted solely to personal attachments, considering it "incorrect (as a matter of logic)".

Loyalty to people and abstract notions such as causes or ideals is considered an evolutionary tactic, as there is a greater chance of survival and procreation if animals belong to loyal packs.

Immanuel Kant constructed the basis for an ethical law via the concept of duty. Kant began his ethical theory by arguing that the only virtue that can be unqualifiedly good is a good will. No other virtue has this status because every other virtue can be used to achieve immoral ends (for example, the virtue of loyalty is not good if one is loyal to an evil person). The good will is unique in that it is always good and maintains its moral value even when it fails to achieve its moral intentions. Kant regarded the good will as a single moral principle that freely chooses to use the other virtues for moral ends.

=== Multiplicity, disloyalty, and whether loyalty is exclusionary ===
Stephen Nathanson, professor of philosophy at Northeastern University, states that loyalty can be either exclusionary or non-exclusionary; and can be single or multiple. Exclusionary loyalty excludes loyalties to other people or groups; whereas non-exclusionary loyalty does not. People may have single loyalties, to just one person, group, or thing, or multiple loyalties to multiple objects. Multiple loyalties can constitute a disloyalty to an object if one of those loyalties is exclusionary, excluding one of the others. However, Nathanson observes, this is a special case. In the general case, the existence of multiple loyalties does not cause a disloyalty. One can, for example, be loyal to one's friends, or one's family, and still, without contradiction, be loyal to one's religion, or profession.

=== Other dimensions ===
In addition to number and exclusion as just outlined, Nathanson enumerates five other "dimensions" that loyalty can vary along: basis, strength, scope, legitimacy, and attitude:

basis
Loyalties may be constructed on the basis of unalterable facts that constitute a personal connection between the subject and the object of the loyalty, such as biological ties or place of birth (a notion of natural allegiance propounded by Socrates in his political theory). Alternatively, they may be constructed from personal choice and evaluation of criteria with a full degree of freedom. The degree of control that one has is not necessarily simple; Nathanson points out that whilst one has no choice as to one's parents or relatives, one can choose to desert them.

strength
Loyalties can range from supreme loyalties, that override all other considerations, to merely presumptive loyalties, that affect one's presumptions, providing but one motivation for action that is weighed against other motivations. Nathanson observes that strength of loyalty is often interrelated with basis. "Blood is thicker than water" is an aphorism that explains that loyalties that have biological ties as their bases are generally stronger.

scope
Loyalties with limited scope require few actions of the subject; loyalties with broad or even unlimited scopes require many actions, or indeed to do whatever may be necessary in support of the loyalty. Loyalty to one's job, for example, may require no more action than simple punctuality and performance of the tasks that the job requires. Loyalty to a family member can, in contrast, have a very broad effect upon one's actions, requiring considerable personal sacrifice. Extreme patriotic loyalty may impose an unlimited scope of duties. Scope encompasses an element of constraint. Where two or more loyalties conflict, their scopes determine what weight to give to the alternative courses of action required by each loyalty.

legitimacy
This is of particular relevance to the conflicts among multiple loyalties. People with one loyalty can hold that another, conflicting, loyalty is either legitimate or illegitimate. In the extreme view, one that Nathanson ascribes to religious extremists and xenophobes for examples, all loyalties bar one's own are considered illegitimate. The xenophobe does not regard the loyalties of foreigners to their countries as legitimate while the religious extremist does not acknowledge the legitimacy of other religions. At the other end of the spectrum, past the middle ground of considering some loyalties as legitimate and others not, according to cases, or plain and simple indifference to other people's loyalties, is the positive regard of other people's loyalties.

attitude
The subjects of the loyalties have attitudes towards other people (note that this dimension of loyalty concerns the subjects of the loyalty, whereas legitimacy, above, concerns the loyalties themselves). People may have one of a range of possible attitudes towards others who do not share their loyalties, with hate and disdain at one end, indifference in the middle, and concern and positive feeling at the other.

== In relation to other subjects ==
=== Patriotism ===
Nathanson observes that loyalty is often directly equated to patriotism. He states that this is a false equality; while patriots exhibit loyalty, it is not conversely the case that all loyal persons are patriots. He provides the example of a mercenary soldier, who exhibits loyalty to the people or country that pays him. Nathanson points to the difference in motivations between a loyal mercenary and a patriot. A mercenary may well be motivated by a sense of professionalism or a belief in the sanctity of contracts. A patriot, in contrast, may be motivated by affection, concern, identification, and a willingness to sacrifice.

Nathanson contends that patriotic loyalty is not always a virtue. A loyal person can, in general be relied upon, and hence people view loyalty as virtuous. Nathanson argues that loyalty can, however, be given to persons or causes that are unworthy. Moreover, loyalty can lead patriots to support policies that are immoral and inhumane. Thus, Nathanson argues, patriotic loyalty can sometimes rather be a vice than a virtue, when its consequences exceed the boundaries of what is otherwise morally desirable. Such loyalties, in Nathanson's view, are erroneously unlimited in their scopes, and fail to acknowledge boundaries of morality.

=== Employment ===
The faithless servant doctrine is a doctrine under the laws of a number of states in the United States, and most notably New York State law, pursuant to which an employee who acts unfaithfully towards his employer must forfeit all of the compensation he received during the period of his disloyalty.

=== Whistleblowing ===
Several scholars, including Duska, discuss loyalty in the context of whistleblowing. Wim Vandekerckhove of the University of Greenwich points out that in the late 20th century saw the rise of a notion of a bidirectional loyalty—between employees and their employer. (Previous thinking had encompassed the idea that employees are loyal to an employer, but not that an employer need be loyal to employees.) The ethics of whistleblowing thus encompass a conflicting multiplicity of loyalties, where the traditional loyalty of the employee to the employer conflicts with the loyalty of the employee to his or her community, which the employer's business practices may be adversely affecting. Vandekerckhove reports that different scholars resolve the conflict in different ways, some of which he does not find to be satisfactory. Duska resolves the conflict by asserting that there is really only one proper object of loyalty in such instances—the community—a position that Vandekerckhove counters by arguing that businesses are in need of employee loyalty.

John Corvino, associate professor of philosophy at Wayne State University takes a different tack, arguing that loyalty can sometimes be a vice, not a virtue, and that "loyalty is only a virtue to the extent that the object of loyalty is good" (similar to Nathanson). Vandekerckhove calls this argument "interesting" but "too vague" in its description of how tolerant an employee should be of an employer's shortcomings. Vandekerckhove suggests that Duska and Corvino combine, however, to point in a direction that makes it possible to resolve the conflict of loyalties in the context of whistleblowing, by clarifying the objects of those loyalties.

=== Marketing ===
Businesses seek to become the objects of loyalty in order to retain customers. Brand loyalty is a consumer's preference for a particular brand and a commitment to repeatedly purchase that brand. So-called loyalty programs offer rewards to repeat customers in exchange for being able to keep track of consumer preferences and buying habits.

A similar concept is fan loyalty, an allegiance to and abiding interest in a sports team, fictional character, or fictional series. Devoted sports fans continue to remain fans even in the face of a string of losing seasons.

== In animals ==
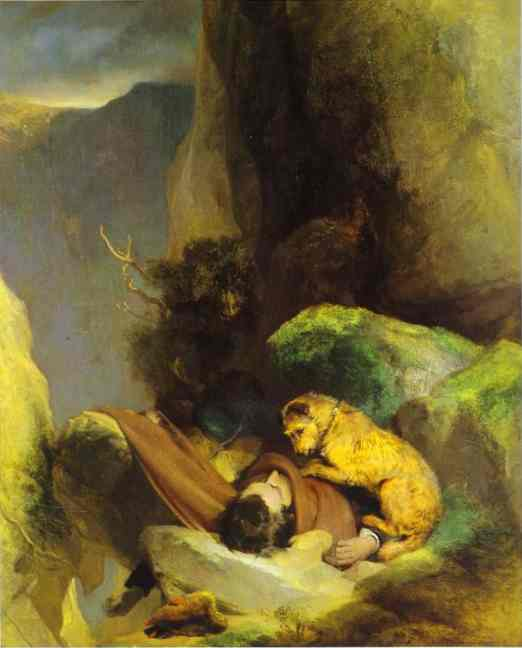
Foxie, guarding the body of her master Charles Gough, in Attachment by Edwin Landseer, 1829

Animals as pets may display a sense of loyalty to humans. Famous cases include Greyfriars Bobby, a Skye terrier who attended his master's grave for fourteen years; Hachikō, an Akita dog who returned to the place he used to meet his master every day for nine years after his death; and Foxie, the spaniel belonging to Charles Gough, who stayed by her dead master's side for three months on Helvellyn in the Lake District in 1805 (although it is possible that Foxie had eaten Gough's body).

In the Mahabharata, the righteous King Yudhishthira appears at the gates of Heaven at the end of his life with a stray dog he had picked up along the way as a companion, having previously lost his brothers and his wife to death. The god Indra is prepared to admit him to Heaven, but refuses to admit the dog, so Yudhishthira refuses to abandon the dog, and prepares to turn away from the gates of Heaven. Then the dog is revealed to be the manifestation of Dharma, the god of righteousness and justice, and who turned out to be his deified self. Yudhishthira enters heaven in the company of his dog, the god of righteousness. Yudhishthira is known by the epithet Dharmaputra, the lord of righteous duty.

== Misplaced ==
Misplaced or mistaken loyalty refers to loyalty placed in other persons or organisations where that loyalty is not acknowledged or respected, is betrayed, or taken advantage of. It can also mean loyalty to a malignant or misguided cause.

Social psychology provides a partial explanation for the phenomenon in the way "the norm of social commitment directs us to honor our agreements... People usually stick to the deal even though it has changed for the worse". Humanists point out that "man inherits the capacity for loyalty, but not the use to which he shall put it... may unselfishly devote himself to what is petty or vile, as he may to what is generous and noble".

== See also ==
- Filial piety – Virtue and practice in Chinese classics and society at large
- Pietas – Ancient Roman virtue
