= Spider Glacier =

Spider Glacier may refer to:

- Spider Glacier (Phelps Ridge, Washington)
- Spider Glacier (Spider Mountain, Washington)
