= Raise (Lake District) =

Fell in the Lake District, Cumbria, England

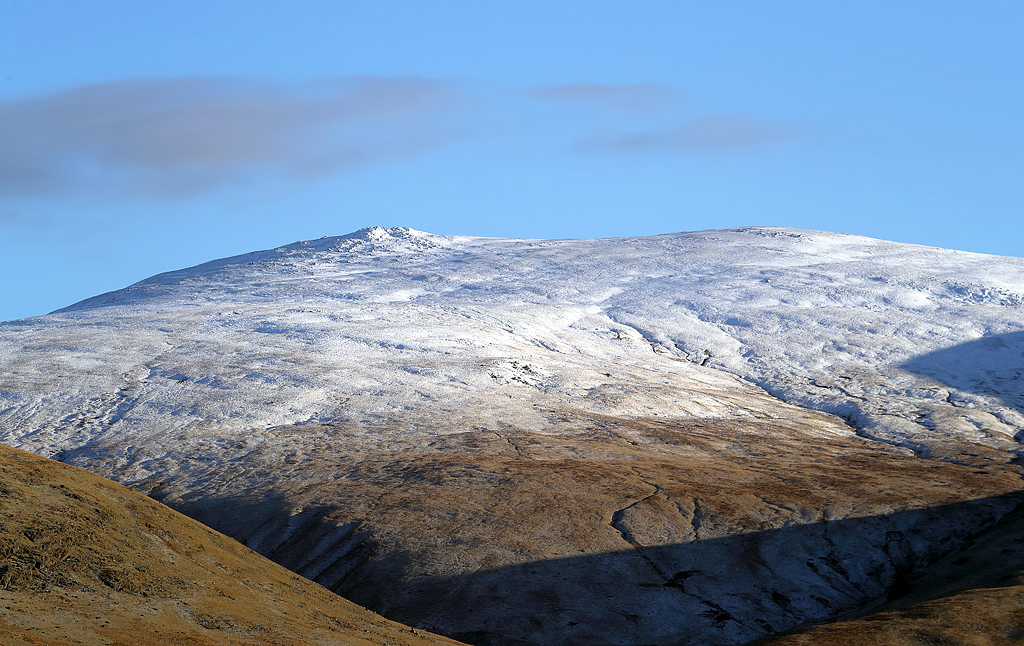

Highest point
- Elevation: 883 m (2,897 ft)
- Prominence: c. 88 m
- Parent peak: Helvellyn
- Listing: Hewitt, Wainwright, Nuttall
- Coordinates: 54°32′49″N 3°00′50″W

Geography
- Location within the Lake District
- Location: Cumbria, England
- Parent range: Lake District, Eastern Fells
- OS grid: NY342174
- Topo map: OS Landranger 90

Raise is a fell in the English Lake District. It stands on the main spine of the Helvellyn range in the Eastern Fells, between Thirlmere and Ullswater.

== Topography ==
The Helvellyn range runs broadly north–south for about 7 miles (11 km), remaining above 2,000 feet (610 m) its entire length. Raise is near the centre of this ridge, with Stybarrow Dodd to the north and White Side to the south. As with many of these fells, Raise displays smooth grassy slopes on the west and rougher ground to the east. Here however the contrast is much less marked than further south around Helvellyn and Nethermost Pike.

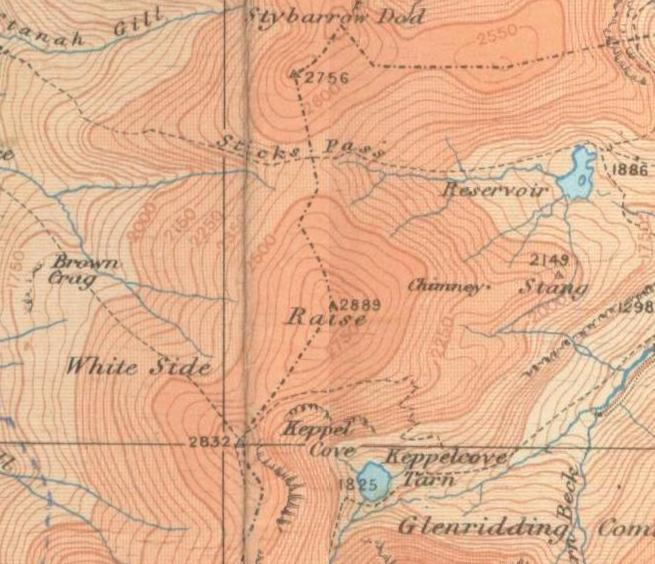
Map showing Raise and surrounding features from 1925.

Unusually for such a high fell, the slopes of Raise do not have a toehold at valley level on either side. In the west the boundary streams of Sticks Gill (West) and Brund Gill meet just below White Side's Brown Crag. As Fisherplace Gill they descend a further thousand feet to the valley, and originally turned north to join St John's Beck. All of this changed as part of the Thirlmere reservoir scheme in 1894, when a water race was constructed to carry most of the water into the lake. To the east the fell is also squeezed out at height by its neighbours, failing to reach the shore of Ullswater. Raise has a short eastern ridge, Stang, descending between Sticks Gill (East) and Glenridding Beck, but these streams combine above the site of the old Greenside Mine to leave Sheffield Pike and Birkhouse Moor overlooking Glenridding.

To the north of Raise the pedestrian route of Sticks Pass crosses the ridge at a height of 2,445 feet (745 m), this being the highest pass in the District crossed by a regular bridleway. Now of use purely to hillwalkers, it once provided the only connection between the communities on either side of the Helvellyns. The name is believed to be taken from the guideposts originally used to mark the route. The becks flowing from either side of the pass summit are both officially named Sticks Gill, the '(East)' and '(West)' having been added by Alfred Wainwright in his Pictorial Guide to the Lakeland Fells and utilised by later guidebook writers. To the north, beyond the pass, the ground rises again to Stybarrow Dodd and all here is grass.

== Mining history ==
South of Raise the ridge swings a little to the west, crossing an unnamed col on the way to White Side. The eastern face of this ridge is gouged deeply by Kepple Cove, a corrie whose back wall is named Red Screes. Kepple Cove once contained an artificial tarn, although today the bed is merely marshy except after heavy rain. The water from the tarn was used in a hydroelectric scheme to drive electric winding gear at Greenside Mine. Commissioned in 1891, this was the first such system in the country. It continued in use until the night of 29 October 1927 when the Kepple Cove dam burst during a heavy storm, leaving an 80 ft (24 m) wide gap in the earthworks. The resulting wave passed down the valley and through Glenridding village, flooding buildings and causing extensive damage. The breached dam can still be seen today.

A further tarn serving Greenside Mine was created in Sticks Gill (East) by the construction of a stone barrage. Called Top Dam, this was still in existence in the 1950s but is now a dry bed. There are other signs of mining activity on the Stang ridge, in particular the stone smelter flue. Prominently marked 'chimney' on Ordnance Survey maps, the flue ran over half a mile up the fellside to a stone chimney at about 2,250 ft (690 m). There are also the remains of a number of leats, artificial channels to divert streams to the thirsty mine. Stang now carries the marks of a more modern industry, with the Lake District's only permanent ski-tow installed on the northern slope. There is some rock outcropping on the eastern slopes of Raise, particularly at Stang End above the Glenridding Beck.

== Geology ==
Geologically, the summit of Raise is part of the Birker Fell Formation of plagioclase-phyric andesite lava, with pyroclastic breccia to the south west. There are also substantial areas of gravel drift.

== Summit ==
Alone among the northern Helvellyns, Raise has a summit area of outcropping rock, an island amid the sea of grass. A little to the east of the top is a rock tor which would be insignificant elsewhere, but in these surroundings draws the eye. A path follows the ridge, with a surfeit of cairns to the south. The view is extensive with all of the major fells being seen. Thirlmere can also be brought into view by walking a few yards to the west.

== Ascents ==
The main routes of ascent are via Sticks Pass, starting from either Legburthwaite or Glenridding. More direct climbs from the west can be made by following Fisherplace Gill and then striking up across the pathless prairie as required. From the east there is a path rising directly up the Stang ridge and a further old route zig-zags up from Glenridding Beck beside Kepple Cove.

== Ski Club ==
The Lake District Ski Club, operate a Poma-style ski lift from pylons on Raise when weather conditions are suitable for skiing or snowboarding. The lift is some 360 m (1,180 ft) long, and the runs are in a natural snow bowl called Savages Gulley where snow drifts form. The Lake District Ski Club had operated for 75 years by 2011, and recently expanded their facilities to include the "Powder room" lavatory facilities attached to the engine hut.
