= Catstye Cam =

Mountain in the English Lake District, Cumbria, England

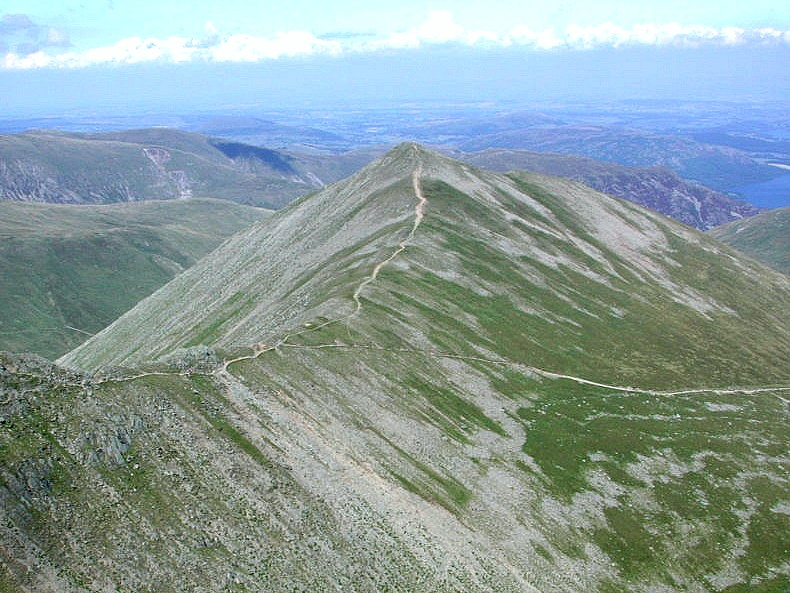

Highest point
- Elevation: 890 m (2,920 ft)
- Prominence: 63 m (207 ft)
- Parent peak: Helvellyn
- Listing: Hewitt, Nuttall, Wainwright
- Coordinates: 54°32′00″N 3°00′33″W

Geography
- Location within the Lake District Location within the former Eden District
- Location: Cumbria, England
- Parent range: Lake District, Eastern Fells
- OS grid: NY348158
- Topo map: OS Landranger 90, Explorer OL5

Catstye Cam is a fell in the English Lake District. It is an outlier of Helvellyn in the Eastern Fells.

== Name ==
The name of the fell is also given as 'Catstycam', a spelling preferred by Alfred Wainwright in his influential Pictorial Guide to the Lakeland Fells. A third variant, 'Catchedicam', is also quoted by him. Other guidebooks such as Collins Landranger and Birkett follow Wainwright with 'Catstycam', although the maps of the Ordnance Survey always use 'Catstye Cam'.

== Topography ==
The Helvellyn range runs broadly north to south for about 7 miles, remaining above 2,000 feet (600 m) throughout its length. Helvellyn itself sits near the centre of this ridge and displays the characteristic form of many of these fells, namely smooth grassy slopes to the west and shattered rock to the east. Helvellyn sends out two eastward arêtes, razor-thin ridges between deep mountain corries. The southerly spur is Striding Edge, easily the most famous ridge in the district, and its northern partner is Swirral Edge. From the summit plateau of Helvellyn a rough slope drops to the start of Swirral Edge, and this narrow ridge curves gracefully down and then back up over half a mile, terminating at Catstye Cam.

Taking on the classic mountain shape of a pyramid, Catstye Cam draws the eye in any view where the overtopping bulk of Helvellyn is hidden behind. As Wainwright said "If Catstycam stood alone, remote from its fellows, it would be one of the finest peaks in Lakeland. It has nearly, but not quite, the perfect mountain form with true simplicity in its soaring lines, and a small pointed top, a real summit that falls away on all sides". Even with the connection to Helvellyn, Catstye Cam still has a prominence of over 200 feet (60 m) due to the pronounced bow of Swirral Edge. High Spying How on Striding Edge, by comparison, is nothing but a rock turret, an independent peak in almost no-one's estimation.

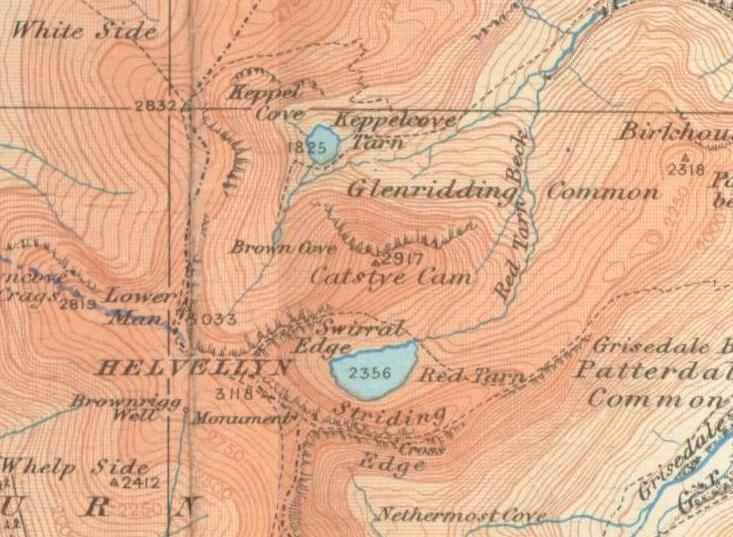
Map showing Catstye Cam and surrounding features from 1925.

East of the summit the ridge declines quickly to Red Tarn Beck, whilst there is a third ridge to the north west, giving Catstye Cam a triangular plan. To the north, between the two descending ridges, is an area of crag. The other two faces are steep but smooth.

South of Catstye Cam, nestling between the encircling arms of Helvellyn's two edges, is Red Tarn. This pool is named for the colour of the surrounding screes rather than its water, and contains brown trout and schelly, a fresh-water herring. The depth of Red Tarn is now about 80 feet (24 m), although in the mid-19th century it was dammed with boulders to increase capacity. This was carried out to provide additional water to the Greenside Mine in Glenridding, the water race still visible as it crosses the slope of Birkhouse Moor.

A second tarn once existed in Brown Cove to the north at Catstye Cam, but this is now reduced to a couple of small pools widening the stream. Brown Cove Tarn was another creation of the Greenside mine, a stone faced dam being built in about 1860. The dam is still in place but water now leaks through the base, the extended tarn-bed a smooth patch of luxuriant turf. A water leat passing beneath the north face of Catstye Cam to Red Tarn Beck can still be traced although it is now in ruins. Water from Brown Cove and Red Tarn unites at the base of the east ridge to form Glenridding Beck, flowing on through the village to Ullswater.

== Geology ==
The principal rock type is the dacitic lapilli tuff of the Helvellyn Formation.

== Summit ==
The summit of Catstye Cam is small and neat, bearing only a tiny cairn. The view is extensive and even the looming Helvellyn only adds to the drama by showing its eastern face in close detail. Striding Edge is also seen in profile across Red Tarn, lines of pilgrims frequently queueing at the bottlenecks. By contrast Catstye Cam is often almost completely deserted.

== Ascents ==
Catstye Cam is normally climbed from Glenridding, either by its east or north west ridges. Both are steep, but there are no technical difficulties. A fair path also climbs via Red Tarn to the midpoint of Swirral Edge, from where a brief detour back to the summit can be made. By far the best option is a circular tour via Striding and Swirral Edges. This takes in Birkhouse Moor, Helvellyn and Catstye Cam, one of the most breathtaking walks in the country.

The fastest known time of getting to the summit of Catstye Cam from Red Tarn was set by Jonathan Jarman of Tewkesbury, Gloucestershire on 11th July 2025. He made it to the summit in 9 minutes and 55 seconds by taking a direct route straight from Red Tarn.

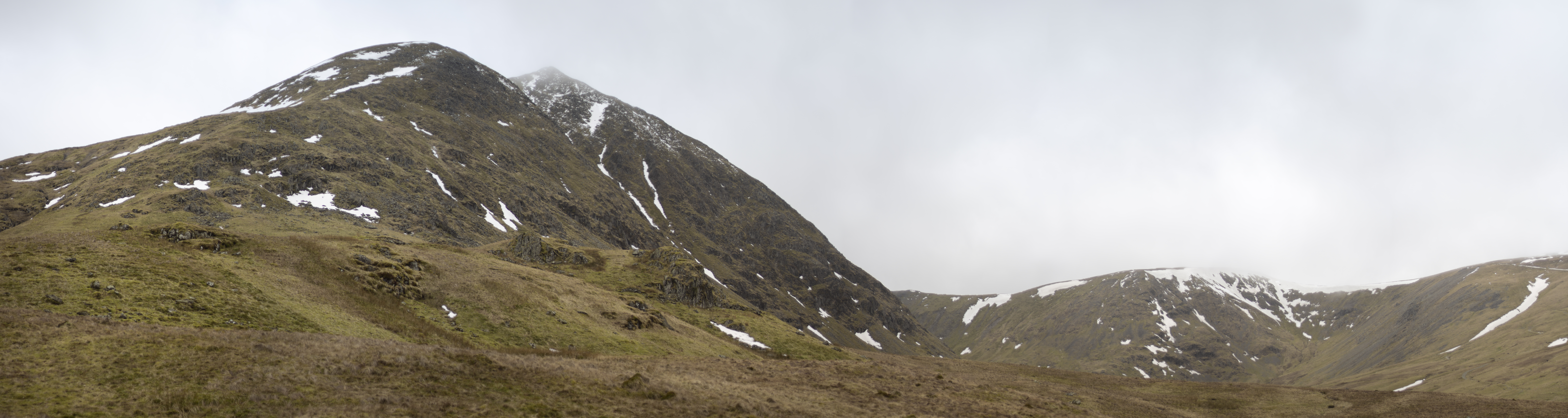
A panoramic image of Catstye Cam, on the approach from Glenridding following Red Tarn Beck (not pictured). White Side can be seen to the right, overlooking Keppel Cove.
