= Charles Gough (artist) =

English painter

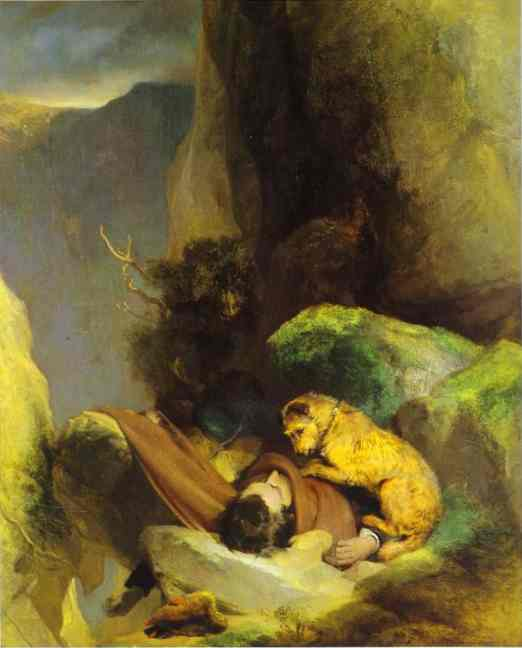
- 1829 painting, Attachment, by Edwin Landseer, imagining the scene of Gough's death
- Born: 1784
- Died: April 1805 (aged 20–21); Red Tarn, Helvellyn, Lake District

Charles Gough (1784 – April 1805) was an artist of the early English romantic movement in the 18th and 19th centuries. He did not achieve significant fame in his lifetime, but after his mysterious death in 1805, he became seen as a martyr, and an icon of the romantic vision. The story of his death was visualised by some of the leading poets and artists of the period.

== Death ==
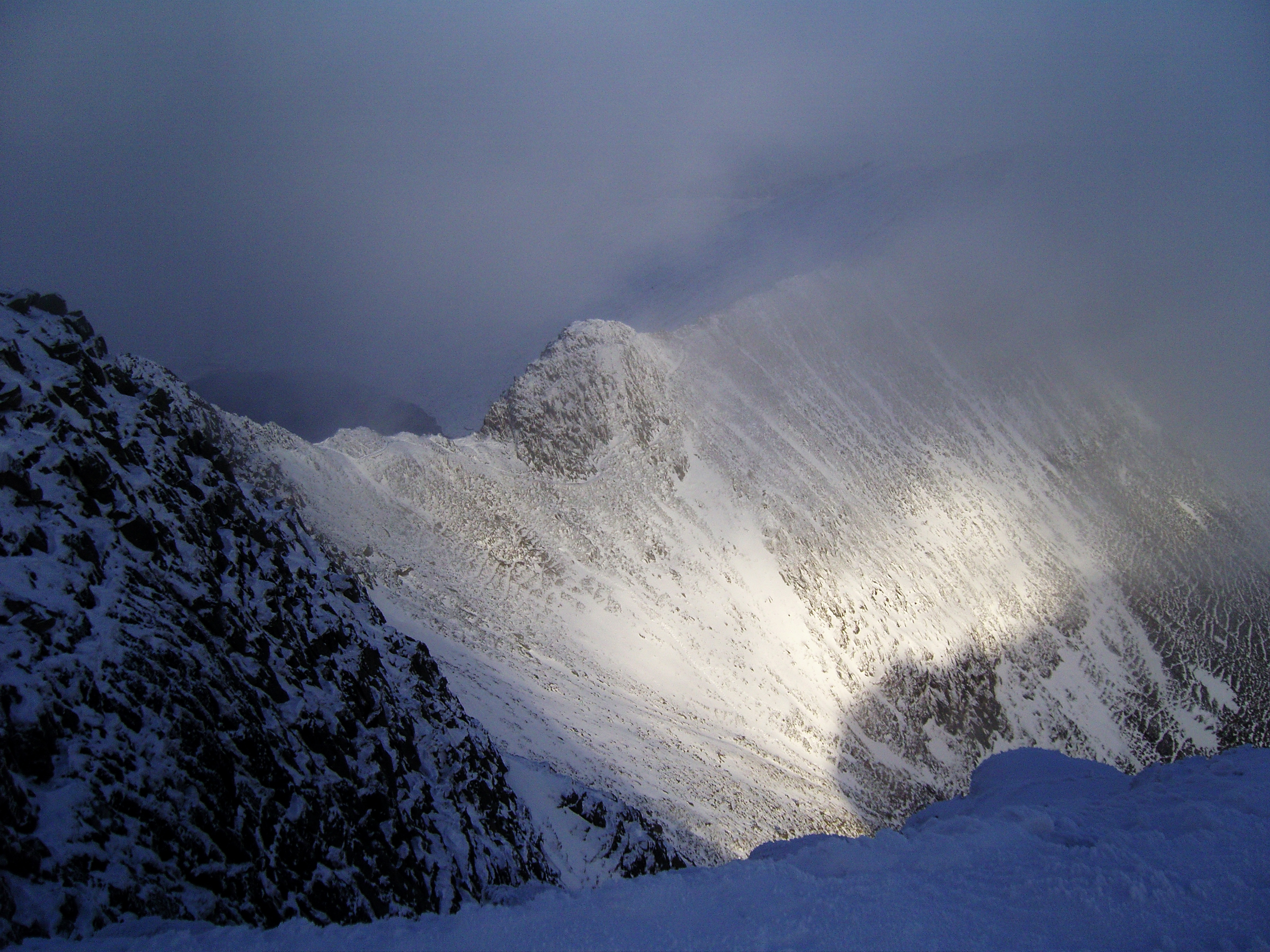
Striding Edge is a sharp arête providing an adventurous route up Helvellyn.

Gough was a tourist visiting the Lake District from Manchester in April 1805, when on 17 April he decided to walk over Helvellyn to Grasmere. He took his dog, Foxie, with him and set off via Striding Edge. He was never seen alive again. Three months later on 27 July a shepherd heard barking near Red Tarn, and on investigating, discovered Foxie beside the body of her master. The shepherd summoned assistance, and a crowd returned to the scene. They collected skeletal remains and some of Gough's belongings, which included fishing tackle, a gold watch, silver pencil and two Claude glasses. Also recovered was Gough's hat, which had been split in two. From this it was surmised that he had fallen to his death from Striding Edge. Foxie was found to have not only survived the months beside her dead master, but had also given birth to a puppy, which died shortly afterwards. The healthy dog and the skeletal remains of Gough led a Carlisle newspaper to report that

The bitch had pupped in a furze near the body of her master, and, shocking to relate, had torn the cloaths from his body and eaten him to a perfect skeleton.

Another report suggested that Gough had been eaten by ravens.

Mystery surrounded the circumstances of Gough's death, not only as to how he had died but why he had attempted the dangerous ascent of Helvellyn without a guide. Gough had been contracted by a local artist to copy drawings, but was renowned for being adventurous to the point of taking dangerous risks. Thomas Clarkson, who had met him reported afterwards that Gough was a "venturesome person" whose headstrong nature had caused the local shepherds alarm". Gough was to have been guided by a man who was a volunteer in the local militia, but who was busy on parade that day. Gough's body was subsequently buried in the Quaker graveyard in Tirril near Penrith, Cumbria.

== Impact ==
The nature of Gough's death, in search of the romantic ideal and subsequently guarded by his dog inspired both poets and artists to interpret the scene and so elevate Gough to the level of a martyr to the romantic vision. Such interpretations stressed man's bond with nature, as represented by the faithful dog contrasted with the wildness and savagery of the landscape that caused his death. Francis Danby and Edwin Landseer painted the scene, Landseer titling his Attachment. The painting was exhibited at the Royal Academy in 1830, accompanied by the poem Hellvellyn, written about the death by Sir Walter Scott. William Wordsworth also produced a poem describing the scene, entitled Fidelity. Wordsworth lived in the lakes, and had brought both Scott and the chemist Humphry Davy to see the spot where Gough's body was found.

Gough's demise was investigated by Simon Morley in The Unfortunate Tourist of Helvellyn, and is commemorated today in an ale brewed by the Tirril Brewery entitled 'Charles Gough's Old Faithful'.
