= Helvellyn range =

Part of the Eastern Fells in the English Lakes District

The Helvellyn range is the name given to a part of the Eastern Fells in the English Lake District, "fell" being the local word for "hill". The name comes from Helvellyn, the highest summit of the group.

The Helvellyn range forms a ridge extending for about 10 km, at no point dropping below 600 m. The ridge runs in a north–south direction, with Patterdale on the eastern side and the Thirlmere valley to the west. The village of Threlkeld lies directly to the north, below the northernmost point on the ridge, Clough Head.

Generally, the slopes above Thirlmere are steep and grassy, whilst the Patterdale side exhibits rockier features, due to cirque glaciation on the north east side of the ridge.

== List of peaks ==
The majority of the peaks in the range lie directly on the north–south axis, although there are some outliers on the eastern side of the ridge.

- Clough Head (726 m)
- Great Dodd (856 m)
- Watson's Dodd (789 m)
- Stybarrow Dodd (843 m)
  - Green Side (795 m)
  - Hart Side (756 m)
  - Sheffield Pike (675 m)
- Raise (883 m)
- White Side (863 m)
- Helvellyn Lower Man (925 m)
- Helvellyn (950 m)
  - Catstye Cam (890 m)
  - Striding Edge (863 m)
  - Birkhouse Moor (718 m)
- Nethermost Pike (891 m)
- High Crag (884 m)
- Dollywaggon Pike (858 m)

South of Dollywaggon Pike the land drops to a height of 574 m by the side of Grisedale Tarn at the head of Grisedale, before rising again to Seat Sandal. Dollywaggon Pike is usually considered to mark the southernmost peak of the Helvellyn range, although the term is sometimes used more broadly to include Fairfield and the other peaks north of Ambleside.
