= Spider Glacier (Spider Mountain, Washington) =

Glacier in Washington, United States

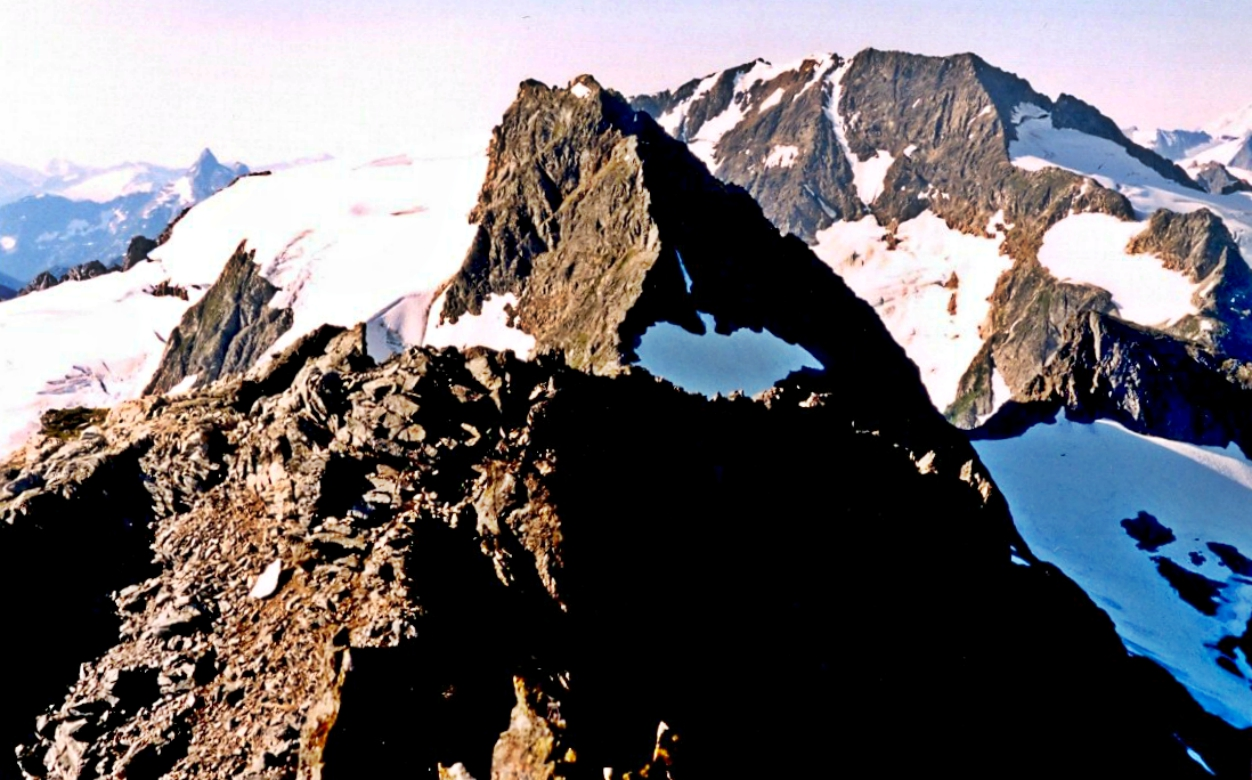
- Spider Glacier below the arête of Spider Mountain in the right background, with Hurry-up Peak in the foreground

- Location within Washington (state)
- Type: Mountain glacier
- Location: Chelan County, Washington, U.S.
- Coordinates: 48°24′49″N 121°01′54″W
- Length: .30 mi (0.48 km)
- Terminus: Barren rock/icefall
- Status: Retreating

Spider Glacier is in Wenatchee National Forest in the U.S. state of Washington and is to the north of Spider Mountain. Spider Glacier is .30 mi (0.48 km) long and extends for .90 mi (1.45 km) across the north face of Spider Mountain. Spider Glacier is separated by an arête from Middle Cascade Glacier to the west.

This Spider Glacier is not to be confused with another of the same name nearby, Spider Glacier (Phelps Ridge, Washington).

== See also ==
- List of glaciers in the United States
