= White Side =

Fell in the Lake District, Cumbria, England

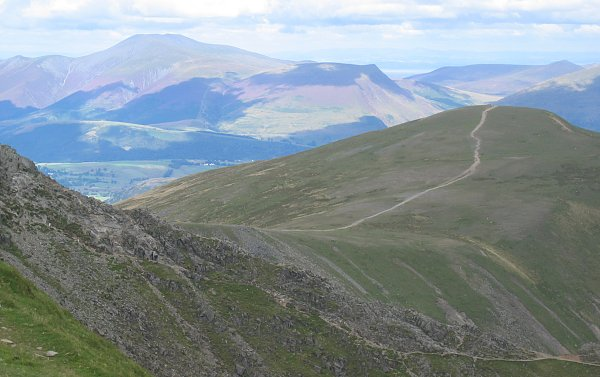
- White Side is the green hill in the foreground. By Ann Bowker.

Highest point
- Elevation: 863 m (2,831 ft)
- Prominence: 42 m (138 ft)
- Parent peak: Raise
- Listing: Hewitt, Wainwright, Nuttall
- Coordinates: 54°32′25″N 3°01′35″W

Geography
- Location within the Lake District
- Location: Cumbria, England
- Parent range: Lake District, Eastern Fells
- OS grid: NY337166
- Topo map: OS Landranger 90, Explorer OL5

White Side is a fell in the English Lake District. It is situated to the east of Thirlmere and to the west of Glenridding valley. This places White Side in the Helvellyn range of the Eastern Fells, with Raise to the north and Helvellyn Lower Man to the south, both of which are of greater height.

== Name ==
Strictly the name White Side refers to the western slope of a nameless summit. However it is often applied to the whole fell for convenience as was done by Alfred Wainwright. He gave White Side the status of a separate fell, a position followed by other guidebook writers. Wainwright suggested that the fell name could have come from the quartz found on the western slope.

== Topography ==
The western and eastern faces of White Side are quite different in appearance. The eastern face is predominantly crag and scree falling abruptly to Keppel and Brown Coves. In contrast the western face falls gently to Thirlmere, the upper parts being mainly grass. The lower parts do provide some rock, such as Brown Crag, but these are generally outcrops rather than true crags.

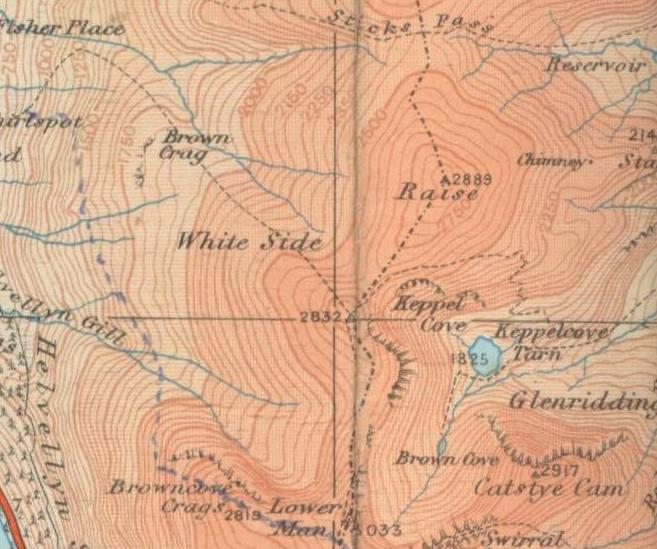
Map showing White Side and surrounding features from 1925.

A great steep-sided hollow is gouged out of the eastern face, just north of the summit. This is the corrie of Kepple Cove, backed by Red Screes. Kepple Cove once contained an artificial tarn, although today the bed is merely marshy except after heavy rain. The water from the tarn was used in a hydroelectric scheme to drive electric winding gear at Greenside Mine. Commissioned in 1891, this was the first such system in the country. It continued in use until the night of 29 October 1927 when the Kepple Cove dam burst during a heavy storm, leaving an 80 ft (24 m) wide gap in the earthworks. The resulting wave passed down the valley and through Glenridding village, flooding buildings and causing extensive damage. The breached dam can still be seen today.

South of Kepple Cove, between the southern ridge of White Side and Catstye Cam is Brown Cove. This also held an artificial tarn, but this is now reduced to a couple of small pools widening the stream. Brown Cove Tarn was another creation of the Greenside mine, a stone faced dam being built in about 1860. The dam is still in place but water now leaks through the base, the extended tarn-bed a smooth patch of luxuriant turf. A water leat passing beneath the north face of Catstye Cam to Red Tarn Beck can still be traced although it is now in ruins. There are also the remains of a level driven into the headwall of Brown Cove, a stone arched entrance leading to an 80-yard (73 m) tunnel. Water from Brown and Kepple Coves unites with the outflow of Helvellyn's Red Tarn to form Glenridding Beck, flowing on through the village to Ullswater.

The western slopes of White Side are bounded by Helvellyn and Brund Gills, both of which originally flowed north to the Vale of St John. With the construction of the Thirlmere reservoir scheme in 1884 these streams were diverted to feed the lake a cutting being made through the low ridge which runs parallel to the shore.

== Summit ==
The summit bears a small cairn in a sea of grass with the main ridge path crossing the highest point. Other than north and south where higher fells intervene, the view is good. The subsidiary top of Brown Crag (2,000 feet, 610 m) on the western face also provides fine views of Skiddaw and The Dodds.

== Ascents ==
Ascents from the west begin at Swirls or Thirlspot. The Old Pony or White Stones Routes to Helvellyn can be used to give a start before branching off to White Side. Alternatively a more direct path from behind Fisher Place makes straight for the summit. From Glenridding in the east a bridleway zig-zags up beside Kepple Cove to reach the ridge not far from the top. It is also possible to take a direct (and steep) line direct from Brown Cove Dam.
