= Helvellyn =

Mountain in the English Lake District

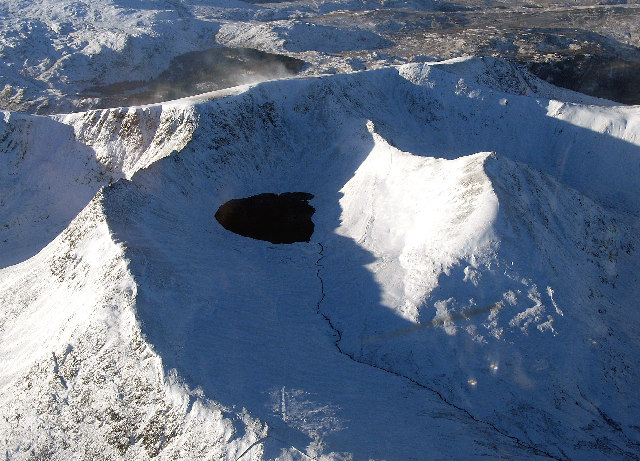
- Helvellyn from the air in December. Red Tarn (centre) is flanked by Striding Edge (left) and Swirral Edge

Highest point
- Elevation: 950 metres (3,116 ft)
- Prominence: 712 m (2,336 ft)
- Listing: Furth, Marilyn, Hewitt, Nuttall, Historic County Top, Wainwright, Birkett
- Coordinates: 54°31′38″N 3°00′58″W

Naming
- English translation: Pale yellow moorland
- Language of name: Cumbric

Geography
- Location within the Lake District Location within the former Allerdale Borough Location within the former Eden District
- Location: Cumbria, England
- Parent range: Lake District, Eastern Fells
- OS grid: NY342151
- Topo map: OS Landrangers 90, Explorer OL5

Helvellyn (/hɛlˈvɛlɪn/; possible meaning: pale yellow moorland) is a mountain in the English Lake District, the highest point of the Helvellyn range, a north–south line of mountains to the north of Ambleside, between the lakes of Thirlmere and Ullswater.

Helvellyn is the third-highest point both in England and in the Lake District, and access to Helvellyn is easier than to the two higher peaks of Scafell Pike and Scafell. The scenery includes three deep glacial coves and two sharp-topped ridges on the eastern side (Striding Edge and Swirral Edge). Helvellyn was one of the earliest fells to prove popular with walkers and explorers; beginning especially in the later 18th century. Among the early visitors to Helvellyn were the poets Samuel Taylor Coleridge and William Wordsworth, both of whom lived nearby at one period. Routes up the mountain permit approach from many directions.

However, traversing the mountain is not without dangers; over the last two hundred years there have been a number of fatalities. The artist Charles Gough is more famous for his death on Striding Edge in 1805 than for what he achieved in his life. Among the human feats upon the mountain, one of the strangest was the landing and take-off of a small aeroplane on the summit in 1926.

Since 2020, the summit of Helvellyn including both Striding and Swirral Edges and the wider Glenridding Common have been managed by the John Muir Trust, a wild places conservation charity in partnership with the Lake District Park Authority.

== Topography ==
=== General description ===
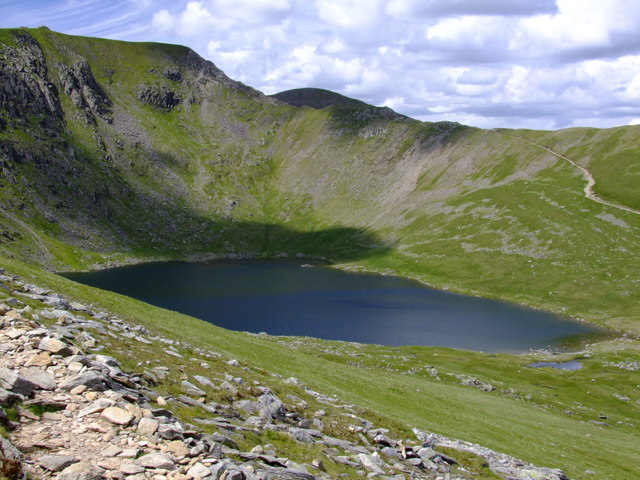
The eastern side of Helvellyn: Looking down onto Red Tarn from Striding Edge, with the summit of Helvellyn and Swirral Edge beyond

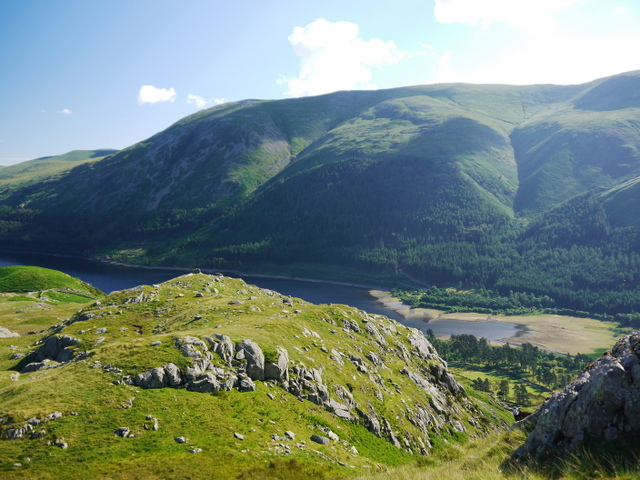
The western side of Helvellyn: Helvellyn Screes and Whelp Side seen over Thirlmere from the Wythburn Fells

The volcanic rocks of which the mountain is made were formed in the caldera of an ancient volcano, many of them in violently explosive eruptions, about 450 million years ago during the Ordovician period. During the last ice age these rocks were carved by glaciers to create the landforms seen today.

Since the end of the last ice age, small populations of arctic-alpine plants have survived in favourable spots on rock ledges high in the eastern coves. A species of alpine butterfly rare in Britain, the mountain ringlet, lives on and around Helvellyn. Mineral veins, some with deposits of the lead ore galena, exist within Helvellyn's rocks, but attempts to find sufficient quantities of lead to be worth mining have failed.

The top of Helvellyn is a broad plateau, trending roughly from northwest to southeast for about a kilometre between Lower Man and the start of Striding Edge. Throughout this distance it remains more than 900 m (3,000 ft) high. To the west the mountain is rounded, its shape before glaciation: the ground drops gently at first but then more steeply down to Thirlmere, whereas on the eastern side deep glacial coves, each backed by high cliffs, are separated by spectacular sharp ridges or arêtes. The middle of these coves contains Red Tarn. The reason for this east–west contrast has been debated.

Like much of the main ridge of the range, Helvellyn stands on the watershed between Thirlmere and the Derwent river system to the west, and Ullswater and the Eden river system to the east. Streams on the west side drain directly into Thirlmere, apart from Helvellyn Gill which flows into a parallel valley to the east of Great How and empties into St John's Beck. A leat captured the water of Helvellyn Gill, taking it into Thirlmere reservoir.

A never-failing spring called Brownrigg Well exists 90 m (300 ft) below the summit of Helvellyn, about 500 m (550 yd) due west of the highest point, at the head of Whelpside Gill at 2,800 feet. In the nineteenth century a leat was constructed to direct the water of this spring into the gill to its north to serve the needs of the Helvellyn Mine further down. This leat has now fallen into disuse. The gill it led to is not named on any map, but some authors have referred to it as Mines Gill.

A shoulder of the mountain, Whelp Side, between Whelpside Gill and Mines Gill, is largely grassy though with a few crags and boulders, and with coniferous plantations on its lower slopes around the reservoir. North of Mines Gill are the Helvellyn Screes, a more craggy stretch of hillside, beneath the north-west ridge, with a loose scree covering in places.

The deep coves on the rocky eastern side of Helvellyn drain into Ullswater. Water from Brown Cove and Red Tarn unite below Catstye Cam to form Glenridding Beck, which flows through Glenridding village to the lake, while Nethermost Cove drains into Ullswater via Grisedale Beck and Patterdale village.

Red Tarn, enclosed between Striding Edge and Swirral Edge, is about 25 m (82 ft) deep, but in the mid-nineteenth century a dam was built to increase its capacity and supply the needs of the Greenside Mine near Glenridding. That dam has now gone, and the tarn has returned to its natural size. It contains brown trout and schelly, a species of whitefish found in only four bodies of water in the Lake District.

A second reservoir was built around 1860 in Brown Cove, between Swirral Edge and Lower Man, along with one further down the valley in Keppel Cove. These provided water to generate hydroelectric power for the lead mine. The dam in Keppel Cove is still in place, but water now leaks through its base. The remains of the dam in Brown Cove can be seen, but again water leaks freely through it. It is unclear whether there ever was a natural tarn in Brown Cove. Guidebook writers before 1860 refer only to Keppel Cove Tarn to the north of Swirral Edge.

=== Ridges ===
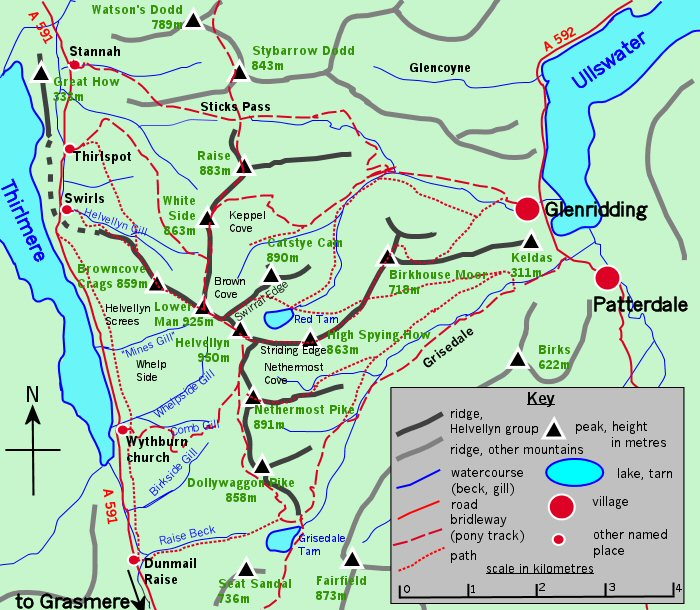
Sketch map of the topography of Helvellyn, with access routes Click to enlarge

A total of five ridges diverge from the summit ridge of Helvellyn at different points. The northwest ridge continues from Lower Man over Browncove Crags, becoming almost insignificant when it reaches the shore of Thirlmere, yet still separating the valley of Helvellyn Gill from the reservoir, before finally rising again to the wooded height of Great How at its terminus. The north ridge, the main ridge of the range, descends from Lower Man, passing over White Side and Raise to Sticks Pass, then over Stybarrow Dodd and Great Dodd to terminate at Clough Head.

The northeast ridge is Swirral Edge, a sharp arête which joins the summit ridge at a point half-way along, and which terminates in the shapely pyramid of Catstye Cam. The east ridge is another sharp arête known as Striding Edge. This joins the summit ridge at its southern end, not far from Helvellyn's summit. It passes over the subsidiary top of High Spying How and leads to Birkhouse Moor before descending to its final top, Keldas, beside the south end of Ullswater. The south ridge continues the main ridge of the Helvellyn range over Nethermost Pike, High Crag and Dollywagon Pike to terminate at Grisedale Tarn.

The former county boundary between Cumberland and Westmorland lay along the Helvellyn Ridge.

=== Subsidiary tops ===
Helvellyn and its subsidiary tops
Name	Grid reference	Height	Prominence	Classification (height and prominence)	Classification (authors' listings)
Helvellyn	NY 34246 15110	950 m (3,120 ft)	712 m (2,336 ft)	Furth, Marilyn, Hewitt, Nuttall, Historic County Top	Wainwright, Birkett
Lower Man	NY 33745 15543	925 m (3,035 ft)	18 m (59 ft)	Nuttall	Birkett
Browncove Crags	NY 33218 15682	859 m (2,818 ft)	3 m (9.8 ft)		
Great How	NY 31378 18719	333 m (1,093 ft)	136 m (446 ft)	HuMP	Birkett
Catstye Cam	NY 34812 15822	890 m (2,920 ft)	63 m (207 ft)	Hewitt, Nuttall	Wainwright, Birkett
High Spying How	NY 35062 14922	863 m (2,831 ft)	28 m (92 ft)	Nuttall	
Birkhouse Moor	NY 36342 15975	718 m (2,356 ft)	9 m (30 ft)	Nuttall	Wainwright, Birkett
Keldas	NY 38515 16300	311 m (1,020 ft)	35 m (115 ft)		

== Routes ==
The whole of Helvellyn, above the conifer plantations to the west and the intake walls surrounding the valleys of Glenridding and Grisedale to the east, is Open Access land. In January 2018 Helvellyn was named 'Britain's Best Walk' in an ITV show presented by Julia Bradbury.

Routes up Helvellyn can begin from the villages of Glenridding or Patterdale to the east, Grasmere to the south, or from a number of places along the A591 road to the west, and can follow any of the mountain's five ridges, or the ridges of its neighbours, as well as some of the gills and shoulders on the west side of the range. Walkers can choose between many routes.

=== The eastern ridges ===
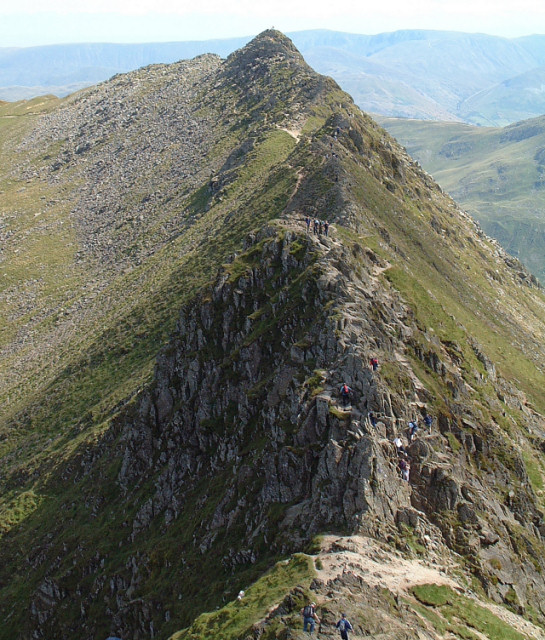
Looking down onto Striding Edge and towards High Spying How

Striding Edge is a popular route which involves some scrambling, linking the summit ridge of Birkhouse Moor to Helvellyn's summit by what becomes a sharp arête. It begins at Hole-in-the-Wall and then stretches for over 1.5 km (1 mi) to the Helvellyn summit plateau. This starting point is accessible from both Glenridding and Patterdale. Hole-in-the-Wall used to be a prominent gap in the stone wall on the top of the ridge where a gate was missing. Today the gap has been filled in and a ladder stile crosses the wall. From here the initial part of the ridge is relatively rounded and has a solid path running along the right-hand side. This changes upon reaching High Spying How, the highest point on the ridge — 863 m (2,831 ft). At this point a narrow path continues close to the top of the ridge, which becomes increasingly narrow, and scramblers often follow the very top of the arête. The path on the right-hand side continues until near the end of the ridge where it switches over to the left-hand side. Scramblers who continue on the top of the ridge are forced to descend an awkward short gully down from the final rock tower to rejoin the path. At this point the ridge connects with the main Helvellyn massif. Reaching the summit plateau involves a steep walk or scramble up about 80 m (260 ft) of rough rocky terrain, known as The Abyss by W. A. Poucher, author of a popular series of mountain guide books between 1940 and the late 1960s. From the top of this climb the summit is only 200 m (220 yd) away.

Striding Edge is a notorious accident spot among hikers and scramblers. In winter conditions the climb from Striding Edge up to the summit plateau can involve crossing steep icy ground and a snow cornice, and can be the most dangerous part of the walk. Without an ice axe or crampons this presents a serious obstacle. In January 2008 two walkers died after falling from the ridge in separate incidents. Another walker died after falling from Striding Edge in May 2008. Over the August Bank Holiday weekend in 2017, Patterdale Mountain Rescue attended a fatal fall from Striding Edge on the Saturday and helped rescue a seriously injured walker and his dog on the Sunday.

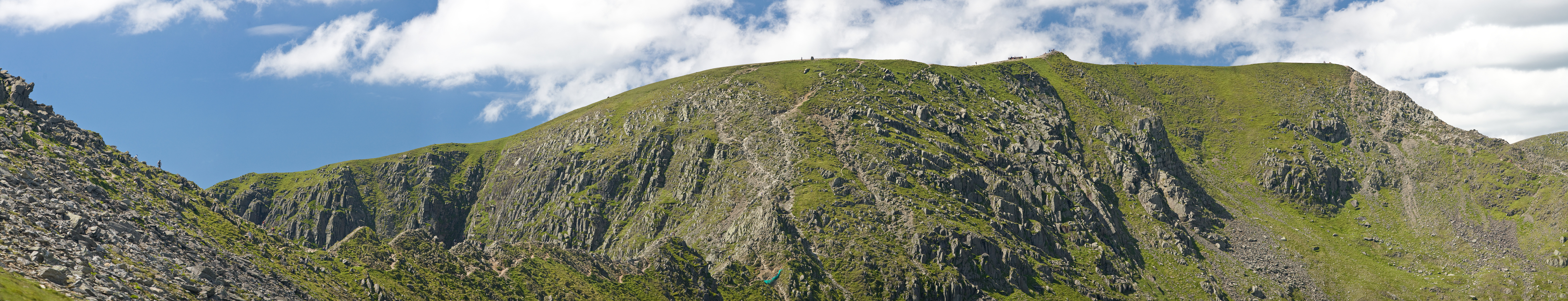
A panoramic view of Helvellyn with Striding Edge on the left, the steep scramble to the summit, the summit ridge with the small summit knoll, and the descent to Swirral Edge on the right.

Swirral Edge offers a shorter scramble along a similar sharp arête. The main path to it comes up from Red Tarn, which is linked by a surprisingly level path to Hole-in-the-Wall, making this ridge equally accessible from Patterdale as from Glenridding. The ridge walk can be extended to include the summit of Catstye Cam.

Nethermost Pike has an east ridge which gives an alternative route to Helvellyn from Grisedale, overlooked by many walkers. It can be combined with a scramble on Eagle Crag, or this part can be bypassed by taking the path to Nethermost Cove before joining the ridge.

=== Other approaches from the east ===
From Patterdale, route of 11.5 km or 7 1/4 mi follows the track up Grisedale to the tarn, and then takes the old pony track up the south ridge of Helvellyn. The second part of this route runs well away from the crags on the side of the ridge.

From Glenridding a similar long but safe and easy walk (11.5 km or 7 1/4 mi) follows Greenside Road, past the old lead mine and towards Keppel Cove. This track, another old pony track, then zigzags up the fellside to join the main ridge path at the col between Raise and White Side.

=== The south ridge ===
Grisedale Tarn is the starting point for the south ridge of Helvellyn, and may be reached from Grasmere or Patterdale, or from Dunmail Raise by a path alongside Raise Beck. Above the tarn the old pony track zigzags up the fellside, and takes a route away from crags on the side of the ridge, and avoiding all the intermediate tops. In suitable weather conditions, another possible route is to follow the edge of the crags as closely as possible, over the tops of Dollywagon Pike, High Crag and Nethermost Pike.

=== The western approaches ===
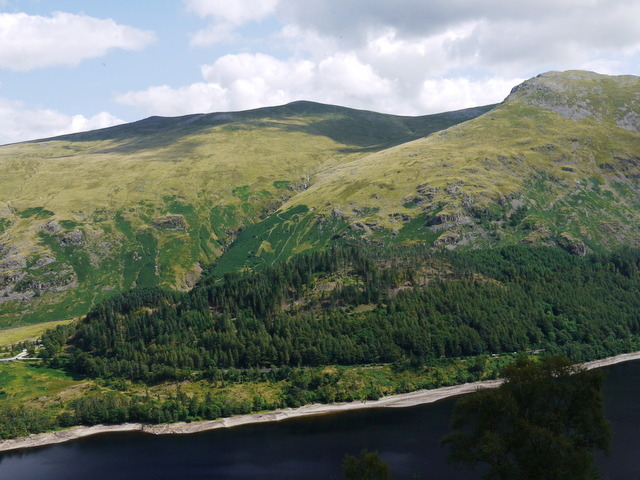
Helvellyn Gill and Browncove Crags (with Raise and White Side beyond), seen from Fisher Crag above Thirlmere

Shorter and quicker routes to the top of Helvellyn begin from several points along the A591 road along the west side of the mountain. Two of these may be combined to create a circular walk.

Stannah at Legburthwaite is the starting point for the bridleway to Sticks Pass, from which Helvellyn can be approached along the main ridge track from the north.

From Thirlspot two routes lead up Helvellyn. The old pony route took a very safe and steady route for the benefit of early visitors, who took horses and a guide from the inn. The route traverses the flank of White Side to join the ridge at the col just below Lower Man. The other route, known as the White Stones Route, originally marked by stones painted white, crosses the fellside at a lower level and fords Helvellyn Gill to join the path from Swirls.

Swirls is the start of the most direct route to the top of Helvellyn, "the modern pedestrian highway" which has been paved where necessary. It zigzags up the fellside above Helvellyn Gill, over Browncove Crags and joins the main ridge at Lower Man.

Several routes begin at Wythburn church. A bridleway winds up the fellside, over Comb Crags and traverses the slopes of Nethermost Pike to arrive on the ridge at Swallow Scarth, the col just below Helvellyn. Other routes from Wythburn follow Comb Gill or Whelpside Gill, or Middle Tongue between these two gills. The shortest route of all follows the gill past the old lead mine, perhaps better used as a descent. Wainwright warned walkers with weak ankles to avoid it.

=== Longer routes ===
Helvellyn may be included in a traverse of the full length of the Helvellyn range in either direction, but with a greater sense of climax when starting from the north. Most of the ridge track is a bridleway. This may begin (and finish) at Mill Bridge near Grasmere.

Helvellyn can be included in a circular walk from Patterdale: up Striding Edge, down to Grisedale Tarn and back over St Sunday Crag.

=== Climbing routes ===
Helvellyn is a popular area for winter climbing in the Lake District. The steep headwall above Red Tarn contains several graded routes, clustered around the prow-shaped buttress on the right-hand side of the face, known to climbers as Viking Buttress, and in a couple of gullies which lead to the summit. Helvellyn's west slope includes Spots of Time, the first grade 9A (V17) boulder problem in the United Kingdom. It was first ascended by Aidan Roberts in 2024, with Will Bosi confirming the grade later that year.

Nethermost Cove has some routes, including a large gully between Striding Edge and the back of the cove.

Browncove Crags on the western side of the mountain has some north-facing routes. These are easier to access from a car park, and they can be linked with the Red Tarn routes.

== Fell top assessors ==
The Lake District National Park Authority employs two "Fell top assessors" during the winter months, usually between December and March. Working alternate weeks, one of these walks up Helvellyn each day during that period to check the weather, snow and walking conditions. Their report and daily photograph appear on Weatherline, the Lake District weather forecast website and phone line service, which includes a local weather forecast from the Met Office. The fell top assessors also put their assessments and photos on Twitter.

== Summit ==
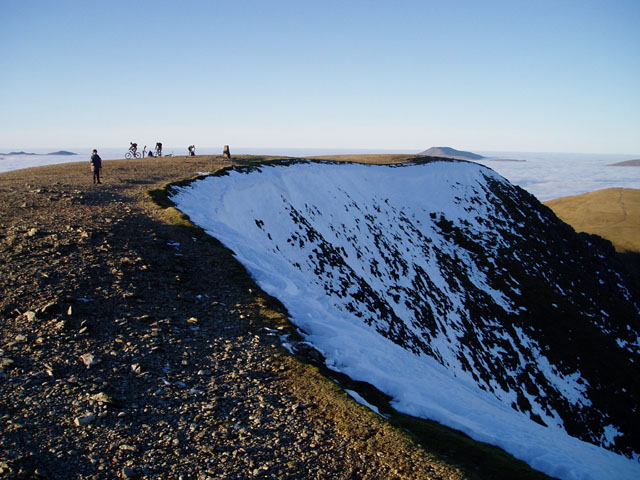
The top of Helvellyn, looking north-west from the summit cairn

The summit of Helvellyn takes the form of a broad plateau, sloping gently to the south-west, but dropping abruptly to the north-east into Red Tarn cove. So smooth and large is this summit that a small aeroplane was able to land on it in 1926 (see History below). The highest point, 950 m (3,120 ft) above sea level, is the top of a small rocky knoll, marked by a loose cairn. In former times this knoll used to be known as Helvellyn High Man (or Higher Man.) To the north is an Ordnance Survey trig point, slightly lower than the summit at 949 m (3,114 ft).

The subsidiary top, Helvellyn Lower Man, is about 700 m (770 yd) to the north-west. Its summit is small compared to the plateau of Helvellyn, but it offers better views to the north-west, as the ground falls steeply away from it on that side.

== History ==
=== Tourism ===
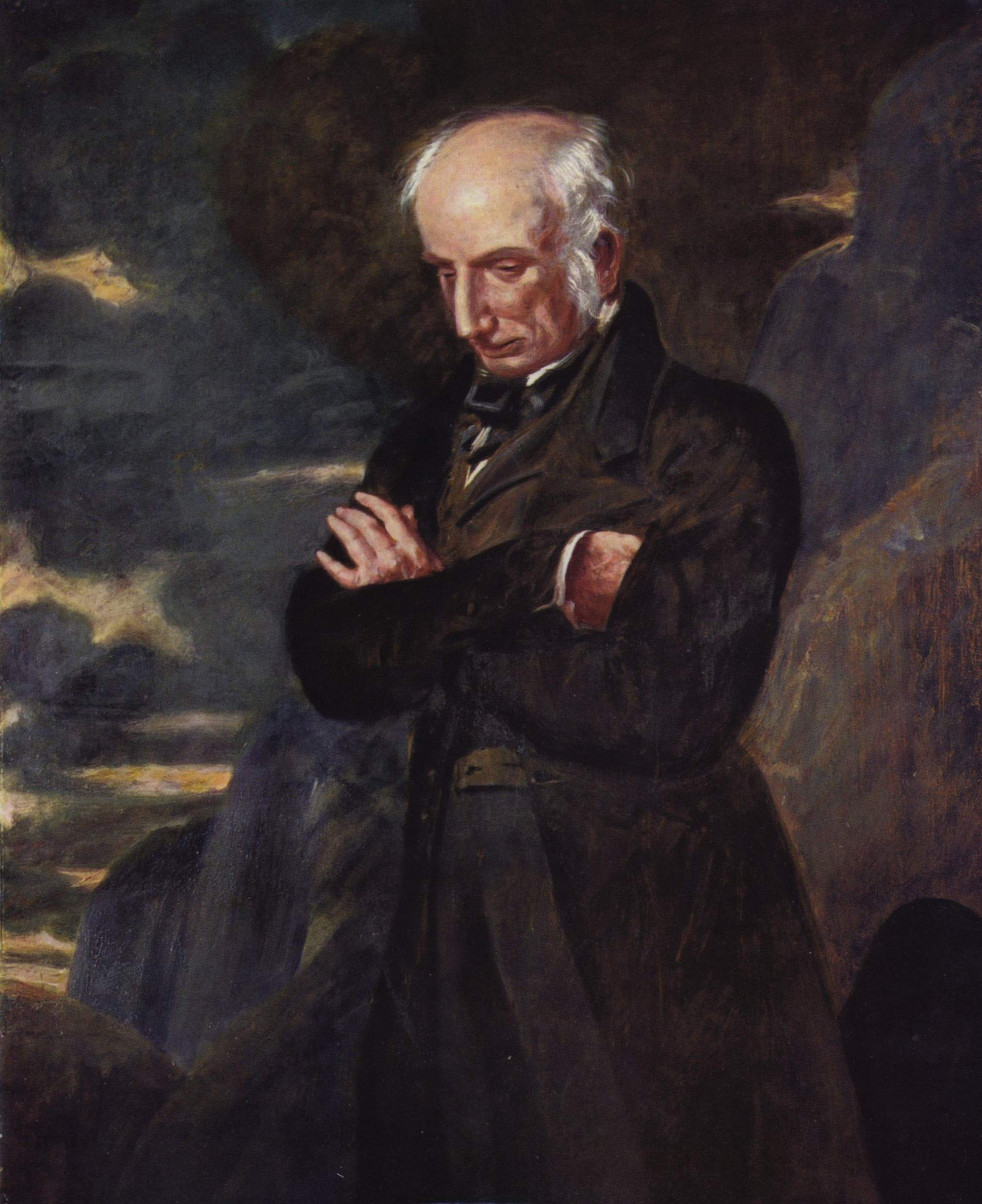
Wordsworth on Helvellyn (1842) by Benjamin Robert Haydon

For centuries shepherds have walked over Helvellyn in the course of their work. Since the late eighteenth century that people have visited the mountain for pleasure or recreation. One of the earliest accounts of an ascent of Helvellyn for the pleasure of doing so is contained in James Clarke's guidebook of 1787. He quotes the account of an unnamed gentleman from Penrith who wanted to eat his dinner on Midsummer Day while sitting in a snowdrift on top of Helvellyn. The man left home at two in the morning, rode to Glencoyne and left his horse at a house in the valley there. He started to walk up the mountain at between four and five in the morning and after five hours hot and hard work he reached the snow and the summit. The snow was covered with dust so he had to dig for clean snow to eat with his dinner. He returned by a different route, reaching Glencoyne ten hours after leaving it.

Poets and artists were among the early visitors to Helvellyn at the beginning of the nineteenth century. Samuel Taylor Coleridge did a lot of fellwalking during the years when he lived near Keswick. In August 1800, barely a month after moving there, he went to visit his friends William and Dorothy Wordsworth in Grasmere, taking a route over Helvellyn and arriving at ten in the evening. A few days later William Wordsworth with his brother John and their friend Mr Simpson made a trip up Helvellyn, setting out after breakfast and returning home at ten that evening. A year later, in October 1801, William and his sister Dorothy rode to Legburthwaite (to the inn at Thirlspot) and then to the top of Helvellyn before returning the same way. Dorothy recorded that it had been a glorious day. They had mists both above and below them, but the sun shone through and their views extended from the Scottish mountains to the sea at Cartmel. Wordsworth's poem, Inmate of a mountain dwelling (1816), celebrating the captivating power of the old mountain, was dedicated "To ... on her first ascent to the summit of Helvellyn." John Keats speaks of Wordsworth "on Helvellyn's summit, wide awake..." in a sonnet that celebrates the poet and other artists. A portrait of Wordsworth, deep in thought among the clouds on the summit of Helvellyn, was painted by Benjamin Robert Haydon in 1842, an example of romanticism in portraiture.

An early casualty of the mountain was the artist Charles Gough, who slipped and fell from Striding Edge in April 1805. Three months later a shepherd heard a dog barking near Red Tarn and went to investigate. He found Gough's skeleton, his hat split in two, and his dog still in attendance. Initial newspaper reports that the dog had survived by eating the remains of her dead master were quickly forgotten. Gough became regarded as a martyr to the romantic ideal, and his dog Foxie was celebrated for her attachment and fidelity to her long-dead master. William Wordsworth and Sir Walter Scott both wrote poems about the scene; Francis Danby and Edwin Landseer both painted it. A memorial stone to Gough was erected on Helvellyn in 1890 and quotes part of Wordsworth's poem "Fidelity". Another fatality on Striding Edge in 1858 is commemorated by the Dixon Memorial. Robert Dixon from Patterdale was killed while following English Foxhounds on the ridge.

A small tourist industry began to grow up around the mountain, with inns providing ponies and guides as well as accommodation for the visitors, and guidebooks being published for visitors. Jonathan Otley's guidebook of 1823 described the view from the summit and claimed it gave a more complete view of the Lake District than any other point. William Ford, in his guidebook of 1839 recommended the Horse Head Inn at Wythburn as a good place to stay and where a guide could be hired "at a moderate charge"; he went on to describe the climb up Whelp Side and the view from the top. Harriet Martineau in 1855 described the ascent from Patterdale. Ponies could be taken as far as Red Tarn, where there were stakes to tether them while undertaking the final part on foot via Swirral Edge. "Though trying to unnaccustomed nerves," she said, "there is no real danger"; the other ridge "is always fool-hardy to do", and "every one knows" the story of Charles Gough. She mentioned three routes from the west: one by Grisedale Tarn, one from the Nag's Head at Wythburn, "the shortest, but by far the steepest," and a third from Legburthwaite (that is, from the inn at Thirlspot.) An advertisement in her book, placed by the King's Head Inn at Legburthwaite, claimed "A guide always in readiness at this inn."

=== Aeroplane landing ===
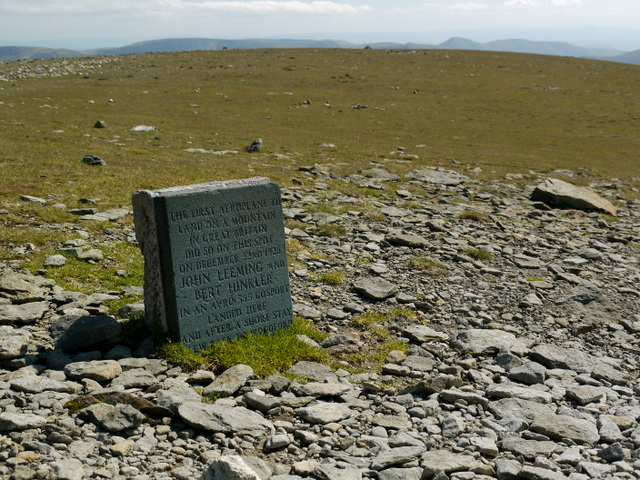
Monument on Helvellyn commemorating the first aeroplane landing there

In 1926 a small aeroplane landed on the summit plateau of Helvellyn and took off again. The plane was an Avro 585 Gosport, a two-seater biplane flown by Bert Hinkler, a test pilot who worked for A V Roe, the plane's manufacturers, at Woodford Aerodrome near Manchester. A ground party had cleared and marked a landing strip. Attempts on 15 December and on 21 December were abandoned. On 22 December Hinkler, accompanied by John F. Leeming, president of the Lancashire Aero Club, made another attempt. The landing was no problem. On the steep slope and with a strong headwind the plane stopped quickly. Professor E. R. Dodds witnessed the landing. The uphill take-off was more difficult and the plane dived off the edge of the summit with insufficient airspeed, but picked up speed as it dived, narrowly missing Striding Edge, to return to Manchester.

A stone tablet on Helvellyn, 40 yards (37 m) south of the shelter, commemorates this landing.

=== Wild camping ===
Many people have camped on Helvellyn, summer and winter, often near Red Tarn which gives good views of Striding Edge, Swirral Edge, and the summit of Helvellyn itself. Although camping in England is illegal without the permission of the landowner, there is a tradition of wild camping in the Lake District. This has often been tolerated so long as people have camped unobtrusively, for no more than one night, and have left no trace of their campsite behind.

Due to the north–south orientation of the summit plateau, the gradual western slope, and the prevailing south-westerly winds in the region, the summit of Helvellyn is often subject to extremely strong and consistent wind. This leads to frequent rescues by local Mountain Rescue teams of wild campers who have been unprepared for the resultant cold, often wet, conditions, or due to tents being physically damaged by the wind.

== Ecology ==
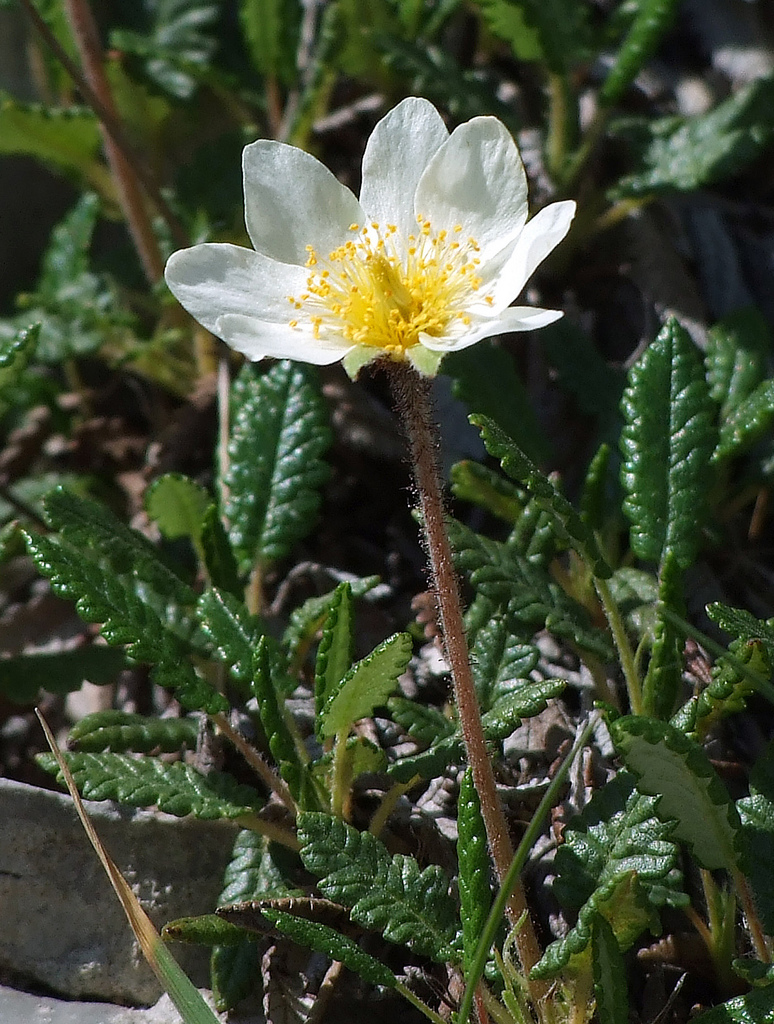
Mountain avens (Dryas octopetala) an alpine species which survives on Helvellyn

Mountain birds around Helvellyn include the raven (Corvus corax), which has now become common. Peregrine falcons (Falco peregrinus), buzzards (Buteo buteo) and ring ouzels (Turdus torquatus) have all bred in the immediate area. Skylarks (Alauda arvensis) and wheatears (Oenanthe oenanthe) are frequently encountered. At one time eagles (probably Aquila chrysaetos) soared over the mountain and bred on the steep cliffs above Red Tarn, but even in Wordsworth's day they had gone, having been persecuted to extinction.

The three coves to the east of Helvellyn are important sites for remnant populations of arctic-alpine plants. Species such as downy willow (Salix lapponum), mountain avens (Dryas octopetala), alpine mouse-ear (Cerastium alpinum), alpine meadowgrass (Poa alpina) and others have been able to survive in these coves since the last glaciation through a combination of rocks rich in basic minerals, a harsh micro-climate and inaccessibility to grazing sheep on cliff ledges. However, these populations are small and are not reproducing well. Natural England has introduced a recovery plan for them.

Red Tarn, a classic corrie tarn, is a high-elevation tarn with low nutrient levels and poor in the number of species it supports. Characteristic vegetation zones include a water-starwort (Callitriche) in shallower areas and the alga Nitella flexilis in deeper water and around the inlet. Other species include a pondweed (Potamogeton) which grows in 2–3 m (7–10 ft) of water and the rush Juncus bulbosus.

Grassland on the Helvellyn range has been heavily overgrazed for many years, yet it supports a diversity of acid grassland species including sheep's fescue (Festuca ovina) on the summit ridge, matgrass (Nardus stricta) on the middle slopes, and fescue-bent swards on the lower slopes. The Nardus grasslands are the haunt of the scarce mountain ringlet butterfly (Erebia epiphron). Acidic flushes (areas of water seepage) with their carpets of sphagnum mosses are common. Less common are basic flushes, which support a greater diversity of species.

The summit and the eastern side of the mountain are part of the Helvellyn & Fairfield Site of Special Scientific Interest (SSSI). This covers an area of 2,418.8 hectares (5,977 acres) and was designated in 1975 because of the area's geological and biological features.

== Geology ==
=== Solid geology ===
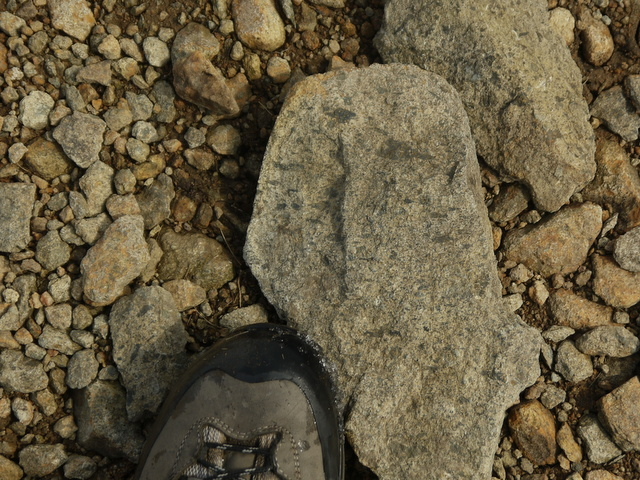
Pieces of lapilli tuff from the Helvellyn Tuff Formation, found on Catstye Cam, showing dark-coloured, flattened lapilli in the rocks

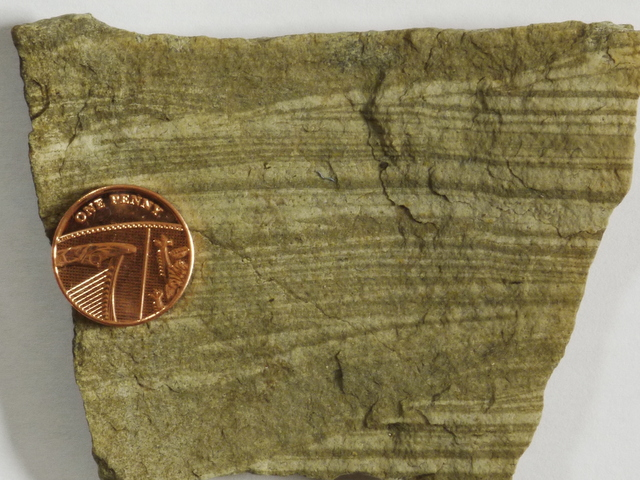
Finely laminated sandstone of the Deepdale Sandstone Formation, found near the summit of Helvellyn

All the rocks of Helvellyn are part of the Borrowdale Volcanic Group, formed on the margin of an ancient continent during a period of intense volcanic activity during the Ordovician period, roughly 450 million years ago. Helvellyn lies within a geological structure which is interpreted as evidence of a volcanic caldera. This is a semi-circular series of faults which sweep eastwards to encompass Helvellyn, Patterdale, Deepdale and Fairfield, and which abut against a major north–south fault to the west (along the line of the A591 road).

This caldera was formed by an eruption of exceptional magnitude which produced a series of pyroclastic flows, fast moving currents of hot gas and rock, which buried the whole district of roughly 500 km^{2} (190 sq mi) beneath at least 150 m (490 ft) (in places up to 800 m (2,600 ft) of ignimbrite). This succession of ignimbrites is known as the Lincomb Tarns Tuff Formation, the most widespread volcanic formation in the Lake District. The eruption of such a huge quantity of magma emptied the magma chamber beneath the volcano and led to the collapse of the overlying rocks to form the caldera.

The lowest and oldest rocks on Helvellyn are those of this Lincomb Tarns Tuff Formation, which outcrop along the western side, up to roughly the 550 m (1,800 ft) contour on Whelp Side. The lowest part of the formation here is the densely welded lapilli tuff of the Thirlmere Member, in which the individual pieces of semi-molten lava were flattened under the weight of deposits above them. Contemporaneous movement on the caldera's boundary fault has produced a thick deposit of breccia above the Helvellyn Screes and on Browncove Crags. The Thirlmere Member is overlain by a deposit of volcaniclastic sandstone, the Raise Beck Member, deposited in water during a break in the volcanism, but succeeded by further thick ignimbrite deposits.

Above these ignimbrites are found sedimentary rocks of the Esk Pike Sandstone Formation. These were deposited in water, probably in a caldera lake, as the volcanic rocks weathered and were eroded. Structures in these rocks suggest the faults were still active and the caldera was still subsiding. Layers of tuff and lapilli tuff indicate some ongoing volcanism. Higher still on Helvellyn, as well as in the coves to the east and covering Swirral Edge and Catstye Cam, are rocks of the Helvellyn Tuff Formation. This consists of up to 400 m (1,300 ft) of ignimbrite, representing another series of pyroclastic flows. This Helvellyn Tuff is found only within the boundary faults of the caldera, and mainly in its western half. The highest surviving rocks on Helvellyn, found on the summit plateaux of Helvellyn itself and of Nethermost Pike, and along the crest of Striding Edge, are the volcaniclastic sandstones of the Deepdale Sandstone Formation. Again, this formation is confined to the limits of the caldera, and represents another return to erosion and sedimentary deposition within a caldera lake, though with layers of pyroclastic rock showing that the volcanism had not entirely finished.

=== Glaciation ===
During the Late Devensian glaciation, which occurred 28,000 to 14,700 years Before Present (BP), the whole of northern England was covered by an ice sheet. Helvellyn was one of a small number of nunataks which protruded above the ice. A short period of glacial conditions returned between 12,650 and 11,550 years BP, known in Britain as the Loch Lomond Stadial (and elsewhere as the Younger Dryas stadial), when the Gulf Stream current ceased to flow past the British Isles. Small cirque and valley glaciers formed in north and east facing valleys, including Grisedale and the coves on the east side of Helvellyn. The results are seen in moraines of unsorted boulder gravel in the valleys, the spectacular coves with steep headwalls, and the sharp arêtes formed where the rock was eroded on both sides between adjacent glaciers. Glacial conditions ended suddenly, 11,550 years BP, when the Gulf Stream current was re-established. Periglacial processes in seasonal freeze-thaw conditions, both present and past, have produced sorted stone stripes and solifluction lobes and sheets on the summit ridge of Helvellyn. These are one reason why the area was included in the Helvellyn & Fairfield SSSI.

== Mining ==
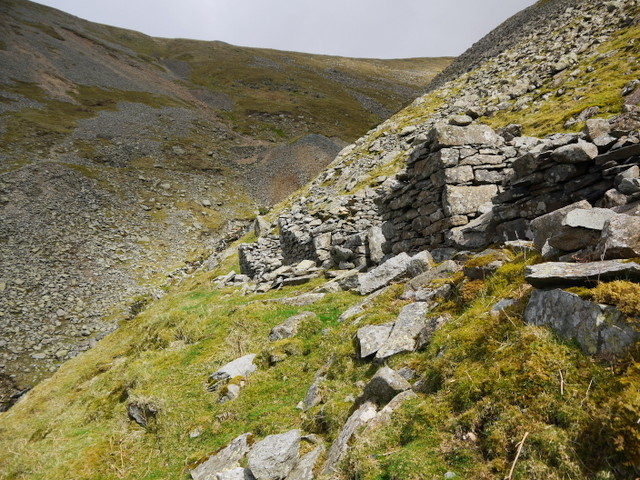
Remains of a building at Helvellyn Mine, with spoil heaps beyond the gill

Two unsuccessful attempts to find lead ore in economic quantities on Helvellyn have been made. Brown Cove Mine was high up at the head of Brown Cove, where some disused spoil heaps remain, with a couple of levels, one of which ran about 70 m (80 yd) into the mountainside.

Helvellyn Mine or Wythburn Mine opened in 1839 by the gill between Whelpside and Helvellyn Screes. It was operated by a succession of different owners, driving five levels through mostly barren rock to explore three mineral veins. It finally closed in 1880 when Manchester Corporation acquired the land for the Thirlmere reservoir. Only a few hundred tons of galena came out of the mine; probably insufficient to cover its costs.

Little can be seen of the levels now for the entrances were destroyed when the mine closed, but several spoil heaps remain, one covering the gill, along with the old miners' path which zigzags up the hillside, a self-acting incline to lower ore to the dressing floor, and the old winding-drum house. The narrow leat which once diverted water from Brownrigg Well into the gill beside the mine may be seen much higher up the fellside.

== Names and etymology ==
Helvellyn. The earliest known record of the name dates from 1577, but early records are spelling variations of the modern name (such as Helvillon, Helvelon or Hell Belyn) rather than any help with the etymology. Various attempts to interpret the name have been made in the past. Some, led by the present spelling, possibly wrongly thought the final syllable was the Welsh word llyn, "lake" which has various historic spellings including 'lin' and 'lynn'. Richard Coates in 1988 proposed a Celtic derivation from the deduced Cumbric word hal, "moorland", and velin, the Cumbric equivalent of the Welsh word melyn meaning "yellow." Hel is a Welsh word meaning to gather, drive or hunt, and helfa (historically spelt helva) has been used to describe a portion of mountain from which sheep are collected.

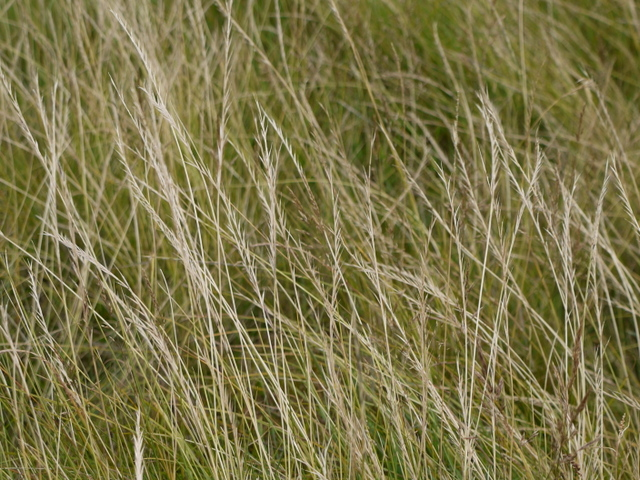
Nardus stricta, a pale-coloured grass

Recent place-name studies have accepted the "yellow moorland" derivation, but have struggled to understand how Helvellyn can be regarded as a yellow mountain. Colour, in the Celtic languages, is perceived differently from the way it is seen and described in modern English. For example, in Scottish Gaelic the spectrum of colours was "pastel rather than primary, gentle rather than bold." Colours were related to a landscape context in which blues, greens, greys and whites in particular were both more diverse and more differentiated than in English. People who relied on the system of transhumance for their livelihood gained the ability to assess the nutritional value of upland grasses from a distance before moving their stock to a summer shieling, and used appropriate colour terms for grasses which would become progressively more green as the spring advanced. Yellow, at least in Gaelic hill names, is not a bright colour. It describes hills which are distinguished by grasses such as Nardus stricta and Deschampsia flexuosa, both of which appear pale and bleached in winter. These grasses are common on the Helvellyn range, in an area where transhumance used to be practiced. Nardus stricta in particular is an unpalatable and unproductive grass, and the Flora of Cumbria specifically notes a possible connection between areas of late snow cover and Nardus grassland at high elevations in the Helvellyn range.

Lower Man. The mountain has two tops, which used to be distinguished as Helvellyn Low Man (or Lower Man) and Helvellyn High Man (or Higher Man). Both are drawn and labelled on a panoramic view of the range found in Jonathan Otley's guidebook of 1823.

Striding Edge. An edge in mountain place-names is a steep escarpment, on either one side or (as here) on both sides. The first reference to Striding Edge was by Walter Scott in 1805 as Striden-edge. A map of 1823 called it Strathon Edge. It is possible that "Striding Edge" has replaced an earlier name, now lost.

Swirral Edge may be either "The precipitous ridge that causes giddiness" or "The precipitous ridge where the wind or snow swirls around." An edge is a steep escarpment, as above. Swirrel, a dialect variation of "swirl" has two possible explanations. It can be used to mean "giddiness, vertigo", but it can be used of a place in the mountains where wind or snow swirls around.

== Panorama ==
The following Wainwrights are visible from the summit on a clear day (distances in miles):

1. Stybarrow Dodd, 1.4°, 2.3m
2. Raise, 2.8°, 1.4m
3. Souther Fell, 4.5°, 8.7m
4. Hart Side, 20.1°, 3.0m
5. Great Mell Fell, 27.7°, 7.2m
6. Sheffield Pike, 41.6°, 2.5m
7. Little Mell Fell, 41.7°, 7.5m
8. Catstycam, 44.2°, 0.6m
9. Gowbarrow Fell, 44.4°, 5.8m
10. Hallin Fell, 62.3°, 6.4m
11. Arthur's Pike, 64.4°, 8.2m
12. Bonscale Pike, 66.0°, 7.5m
13. Birkhouse Moor, 69.0°, 1.4m
14. Place Fell, 73.5°, 4.1m
15. Loadpot Hill, 75.1°, 7.4m
16. Wether Hill, 83.4°, 7.1m
17. The Nab, 89.0°, 5.8m
18. Angletarn Pikes, 91.9°, 4.5m
19. High Raise (Martindale), 98.3°, 6.7m
20. Rest Dodd, 98.6°, 5.7m
21. Brock Crags, 99.9°, 4.9m
22. Birks, 101.0°, 2.5m
23. Rampsgill Head, 101.9°, 6.5m
24. Kidsty Pike, 102.9°, 6.8m
25. The Knott, 103.8°, 6.1m
26. High Street, 110.9°, 6.7m
27. Gray Crag, 111.1°, 5.8m
28. Hartsop Dodd, 114.6°, 4.8m
29. Harter Fell (Mardale), 115.5°, 8.2m
30. Thornthwaite Crag, 118.7°, 6.4m
31. St Sunday Crag, 121.9°, 2.0m
32. Red Screes, 138.6°, 5.2m
33. Hart Crag, 144.9°, 2.9m
34. Fairfield, 152.9°, 2.4m
35. Great Rigg, 162.5°, 3.1m
36. Nethermost Pike, 166.7°, 0.6m
37. Dollywaggon Pike, 167.0°, 1.3m
38. White Side, 345.1°, 1.0m
39. Watson's Dodd, 351.6°, 2.8m
40. High Pike (Caldbeck), 352.6°, 12.4m
41. Clough Head, 353.2°, 4.6m
42. Bowscale Fell, 356.1°, 9.6m
43. Bannerdale Crags, 356.6°, 8.6m
44. Carrock Fell, 359.2°, 11.5m
45. Great Dodd, 359.4°, 3.3m

== Sources ==
- Pearsall, W. H.; Pennington, Winifred (1973). The Lake District: A Landscape History (First ed.). London: Collins: The New Naturalist.
