= Middle Cascade Glacier =

Glacier in the state of Washington

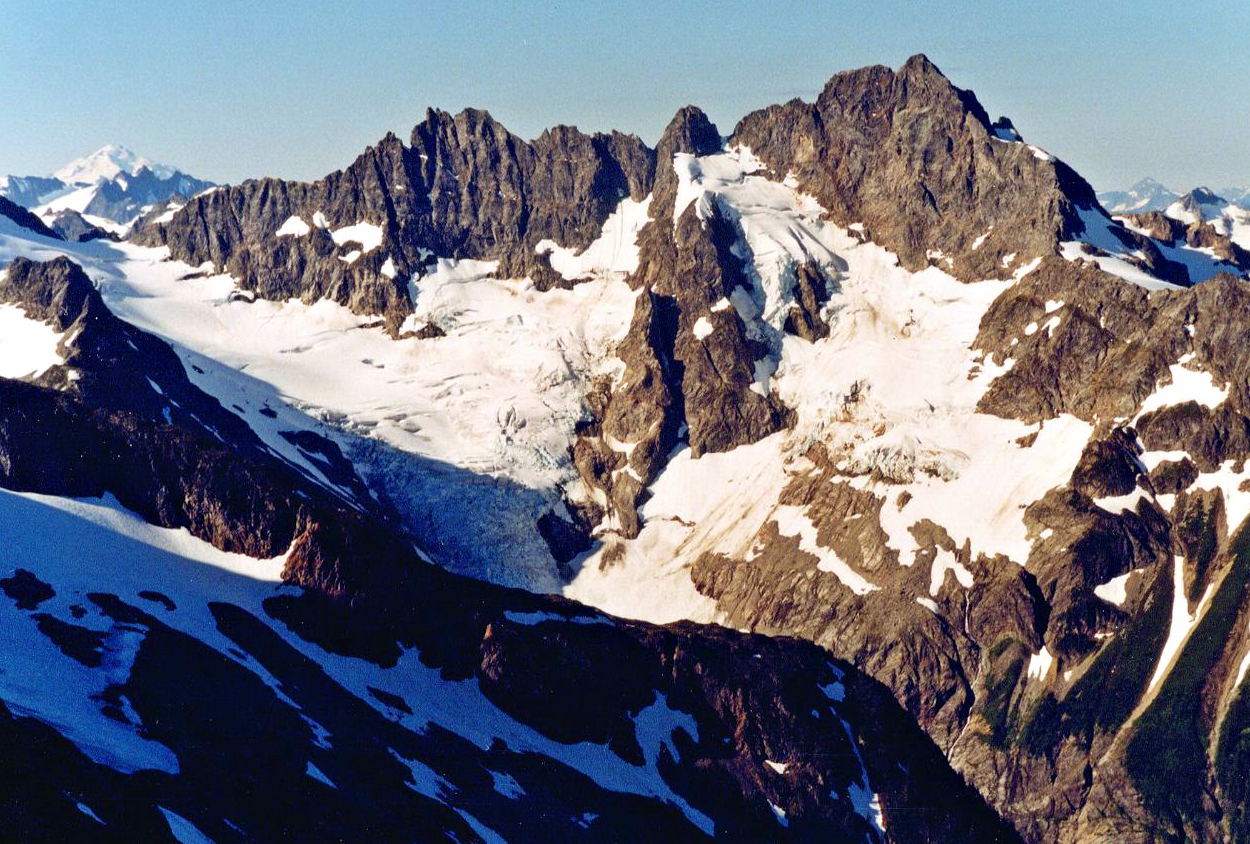
- Middle Cascade Glacier on Mount Formidable

- Location within Washington (state)
- Type: Mountain glacier
- Location: Skagit County, Washington, U.S.
- Coordinates: 48°25′11″N 121°03′16″W
- Length: 1.20 mi (1.93 km)
- Terminus: Icefall
- Status: Retreating

Middle Cascade Glacier is in Wenatchee National Forest in the U.S. state of Washington and is to the north of Spider Mountain and east of Mount Formidable. Middle Cascade Glacier has a significant icefall that is thinning and may eventually separate the upper section of the glacier from the lower. Middle Cascade Glacier retreated 260 m (850 ft) between 1979 and 2005. The smaller Spider Glacier is just southeast of Middle Cascade Glacier.

== See also ==
- List of glaciers in the United States
