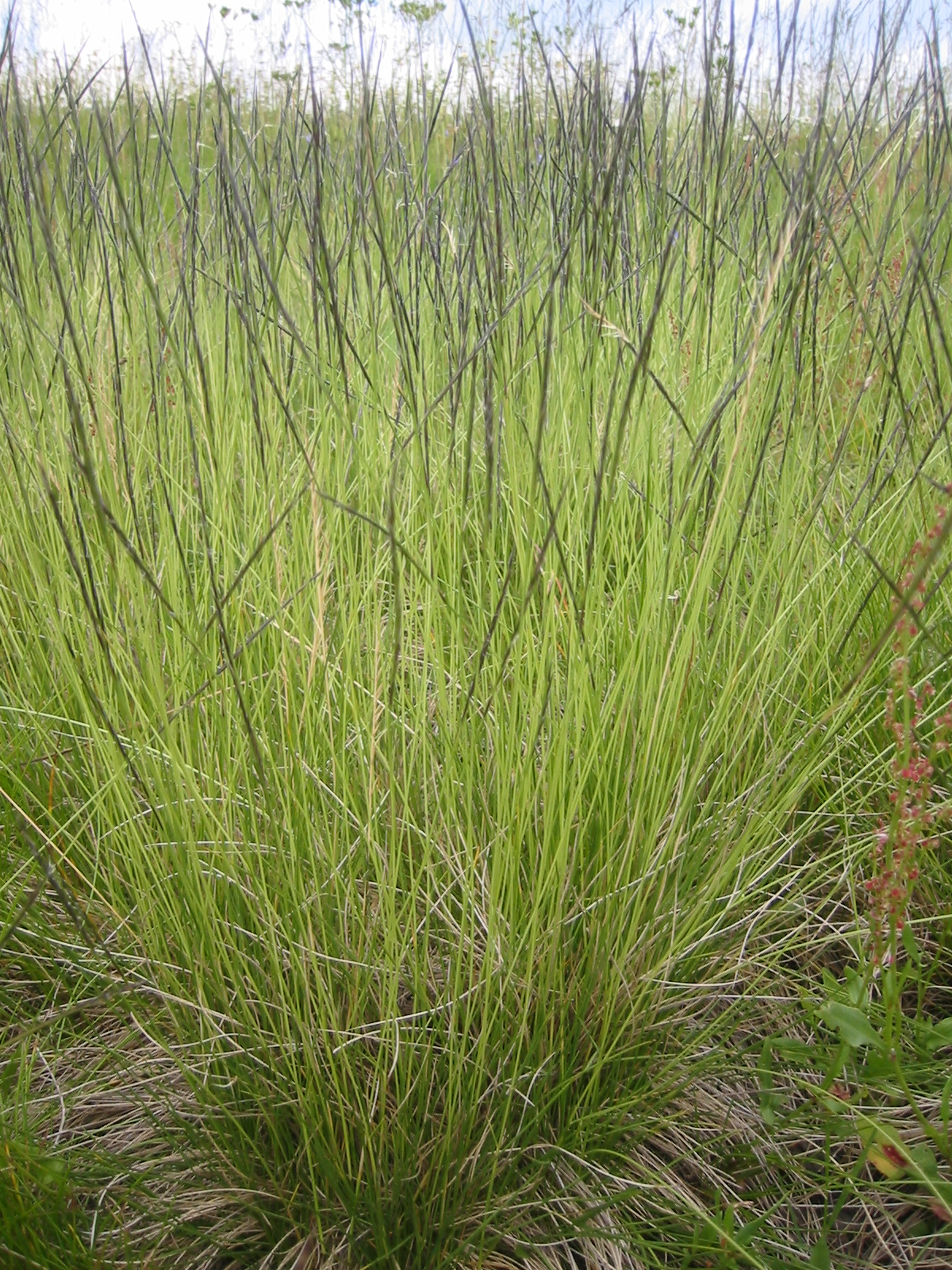

Scientific classification
- Kingdom: Plantae
- Clade: Tracheophytes
- Clade: Angiosperms
- Clade: Monocots
- Clade: Commelinids
- Order: Poales
- Family: Poaceae
- Clade: BOP clade
- Subfamily: Pooideae
- Supertribe: Nardodae
- Tribe: Nardeae; W. D. J. Koch
- Genus: Nardus; L.
- Species: N. stricta

Binomial name
- Nardus stricta L.

Synonyms
- Natschia Bubani; Natschia stricta (L.) Bubani; Nardus glabriculmis Sakalo; Nardus stricta var. glabriculmis (Sakalo) Tzvelev

= Nardus =

Matgrass

Genus of grasses

Nardus is a genus of plants belonging to the grass family, containing the single species Nardus stricta, known as matgrass. It is placed in its own tribe Nardeae within the subfamily Pooideae. The name derives from ancient Greek nardos (νάρδος) from the earlier Akkadian lardu. It is not to be confused with spikenard, Nardostachys jatamansi.

== Distribution and ecology ==
Nardus stricta is native to Eurasia (from Iceland and the Azores to Mongolia), North Africa (Algeria, Morocco), and northeastern North America (Greenland, eastern Canada, and the northeastern United States).

Nardus stricta occurs on heath, moorland, hills, and mountains on nutrient poor acidic sandy to peaty soils and is strongly calcifuge, avoiding calcareous soils. It can occur from low elevations to over 1,000 metres (3,300 ft), becoming a community-dominant in late snow patches on mountains. Nardus stricta may also become a dominant species in habitats grazed by cattle or sheep because it is tough and unpalatable.

It flowers from June until August. Apomixis is found to be common in this plant, with extensive colonies often proving to be a single clone.

== Description ==
Culms are erect and 25–60 centimetres (10–20 in) long, with grey-green leaf-blades filiform and involute, ranging from 4–30 cm (2–10 in) long by 0.5–1 millimetre (0.02–0.04 in) wide, i.e. bristle like. The ligules of basal leaves are 0.4–0.8 mm (0.02–0.03 in) long and blunt, while those of culm leaves are longer, up to 2 mm (0.08 in), and more pointed.

The roots and shoots are very closely packed together at the base of the plant producing a white, tough, highly reflective feature. The spikelets are very slender and loosely overlapping in two rows each side of the spikelet axis. Each lemma is tipped with a short awn.
