= Birkhouse Moor =

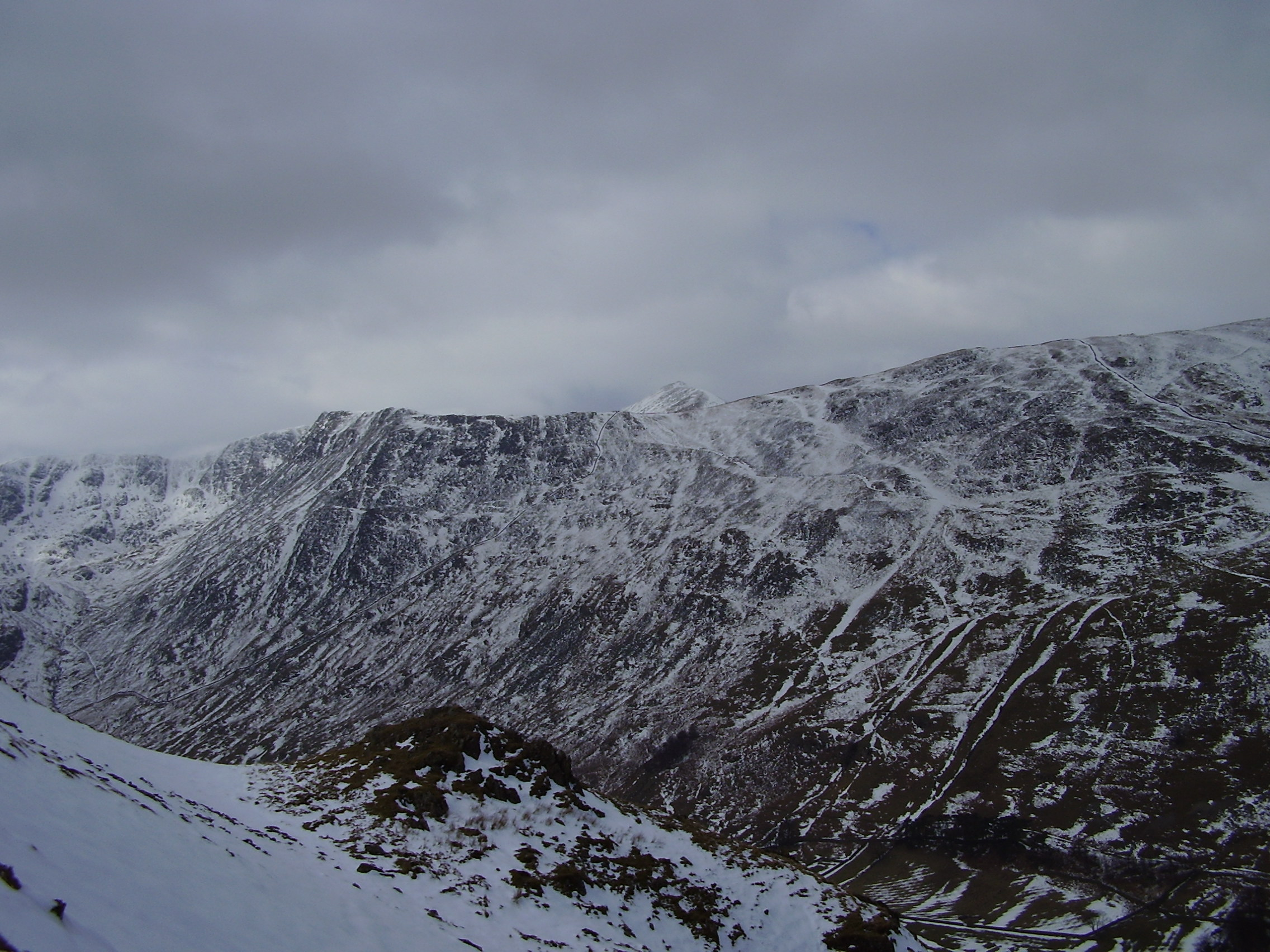
- Striding Edge and Birkhouse Moor (right) from St Sunday Crag

Highest point
- Elevation: 718 m (2,356 ft)
- Prominence: c. 20 m (66 ft)
- Parent peak: Helvellyn
- Listing: Wainwright, Nuttall
- Coordinates: 54°32′07″N 2°59′04″W

Geography
- Location within the Lake District
- Location: Cumbria, England
- Parent range: Lake District, Eastern Fells
- OS grid: NY364160
- Topo map: OS Explorer OL5

Birkhouse Moor is a fell in the English Lake District, an outlier of the Helvellyn range in the Eastern Fells. It is properly an eastern ridge of Helvellyn, but was treated as a separate fell by Alfred Wainwright in his Pictorial Guide to the Lakeland Fells. That convention is followed here.

== Topography ==
Running east from the summit of Helvellyn is Striding Edge, a knife-edged arête which provides the most famous fell-walking in the District. The ridge turns a little to the north at the rocky turret of High Spying How and then drops to a grassy saddle, known as Hole-in-the-Wall. North east of here the ridge broadens into a wide plateau, appearing in plan like a three taloned claw. This plateau, about a mile wide, is Birkhouse Moor. The three talons are the short spurs of Keldas, The Nab and the unnamed northern ridge.

To the south of the Striding Edge–Birkhouse Moor ridge runs the long valley of Grisedale, emptying into the head of Ullswater. There are small pockets of mixed woodland on the lower slopes and above these the valley wall is steep sided with some outcropping rock.

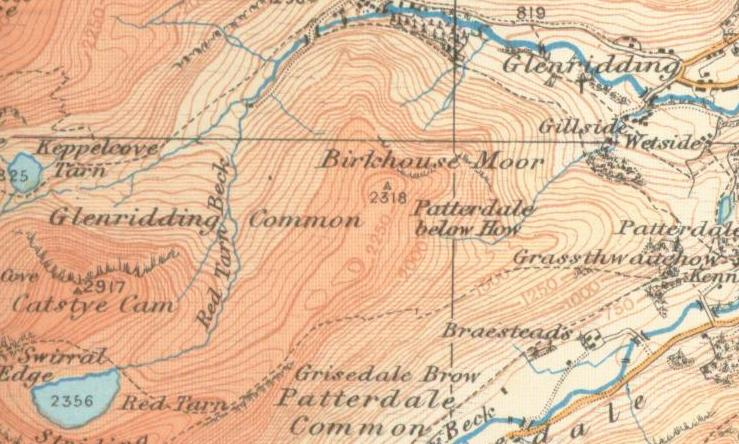
Map showing Birkhouse Moor and surrounding area from 1925.

The northern side of Birkhouse Moor is bounded by the more complex Glenridding valley system. Glenridding Beck has three principal southern tributaries: Mires Beck, Bleacove Beck and Red Tarn Beck. Mires Beck flows from Little Cove, a small corrie separating Keldas and the Nab. Bleacove Beck empties Blea Cove, a short side valley between The Nab and the north ridge. Red Tarn Beck forms the western perimeter of Birkhouse Moor, draining the large tarn of that name nestling beneath the summit of Helvellyn. There is more rock on this side, with Nab Crag rising above Blea Cove and extensive outcropping on all three ridges. There remains evidence on the Glenridding slopes of the former activities of Greenside Mine. Several leats and pipelines can still be traced which once captured the water of these streams for industrial use.

Keldas is separated from the main body of Birkhouse Moor by a small depression containing Lanty's Tarn. This small waterbody gains its name from Lancelot Dobson, an earlier landowner. It was later bought by the owners of Patterdale Hall, the Marshall family, and extended by damming. In addition to fishing, the tarn was used as a source of ice in winter, and the ice house still stands nearby. The summit of Keldas is privately owned but public access is permitted. Standing above the head of Ullswater it provides superb views down the lake, with the ‘Keldas Pines’ giving an excellent foreground for pictures.

== Geology ==
The summit area is composed of the dacitic lapilli tuff of the Helvellyn Formation. The overlying volcaniclastic sandstone of the Deepdale Formation is revealed at Keldas.

== Summit ==
Birkhouse Moor has two summits. The true top is on the main ridge to Striding Edge, which is followed by a stone wall. A cairn has been built a little to the west, but the wall appears to cross the highest point. The north top (2,315 feet; 706 m) lies one-quarter mile (400 m) away at the meeting point of The Nab and the north ridge. A cairn has also been built here and there are good views to the north. Between the two tops is an area of marshy ground with a number of small tarns.

== Ascents ==
Acting as a staging post on the popular ascent of Helvellyn from Patterdale, Birkhouse Moor is crossed by a number of major routes. The ridge can be gained from the Glenridding side via Mires Beck or Lanty's Tarn. From the mouth of Grisedale a path climbs to the Hole-in-the-Wall, with variations allowing the summit to be visited or bypassed. Pathless climbs can also be made up The Nab or the north ridge from Glenridding. The view from the true summit is dominated by Helvellyn and the encircling arms of Striding and Swirral Edges.
