= Red Tarn =

Mountain lake in Cumbria, England

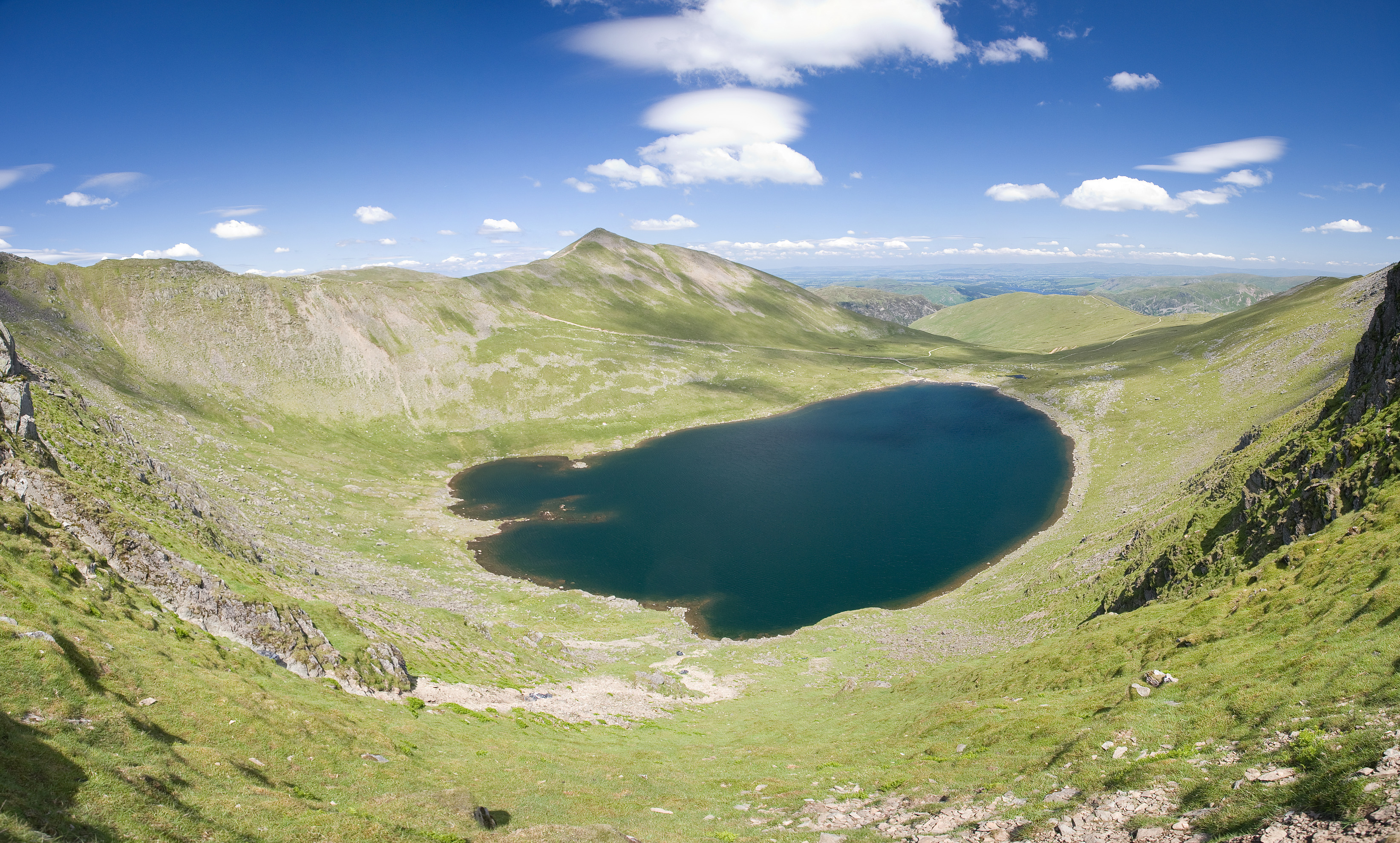
- from the Helvellyn summit

- Location in the Lake District National Park Location in Eden, Cumbria
- Location: Lake District, Cumbria
- Coordinates: 54°31′42″N 3°00′31″W
- Basin countries: United Kingdom
- Max. depth: 25m (82 ft)
- Surface elevation: 718 m (2,356 ft)

Red Tarn is a small lake in the eastern region of the English Lake District, in the county of Cumbria. It is high up on the eastern flank of Helvellyn, beneath Striding Edge and Catstye Cam. Red Tarn was formed when the glacier that carved out the eastern side of Helvellyn had melted. The lake along with three others in Lake District is a habitat for the very rare and endangered Schelly fish. Red Tarn was a dam in the nineteenth century that used boulders that raised the water level some eight or nine feet in order to supply power to the Greenside Mine at Glenridding. Today the tarn is a popular rest stop for hikers and nature goers.

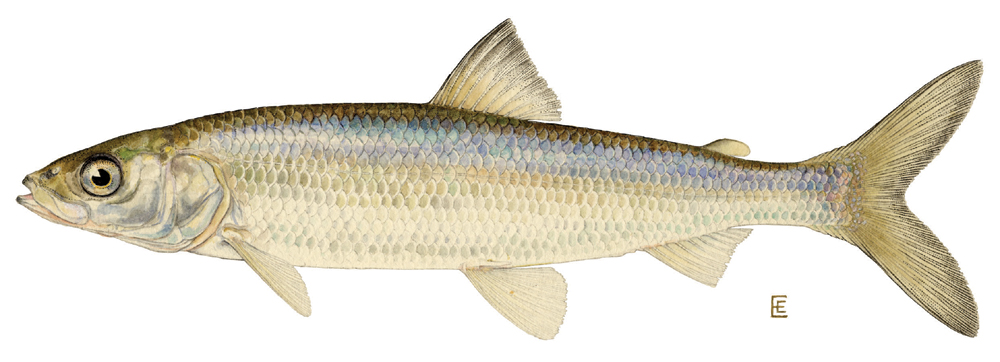
Schelly fish

Glacial Tarn Formation

It lies at an altitude of 718 metres (2,356 feet), with a depth of 25 metres (82 feet).

The tarn is one of two of the same name in the Lake District. A second, much smaller Red Tarn lies between Pike of Blisco and Cold Pike, west of the Langdales.
