= Spider Glacier (Phelps Ridge, Washington) =

Glacier in Washington, United States

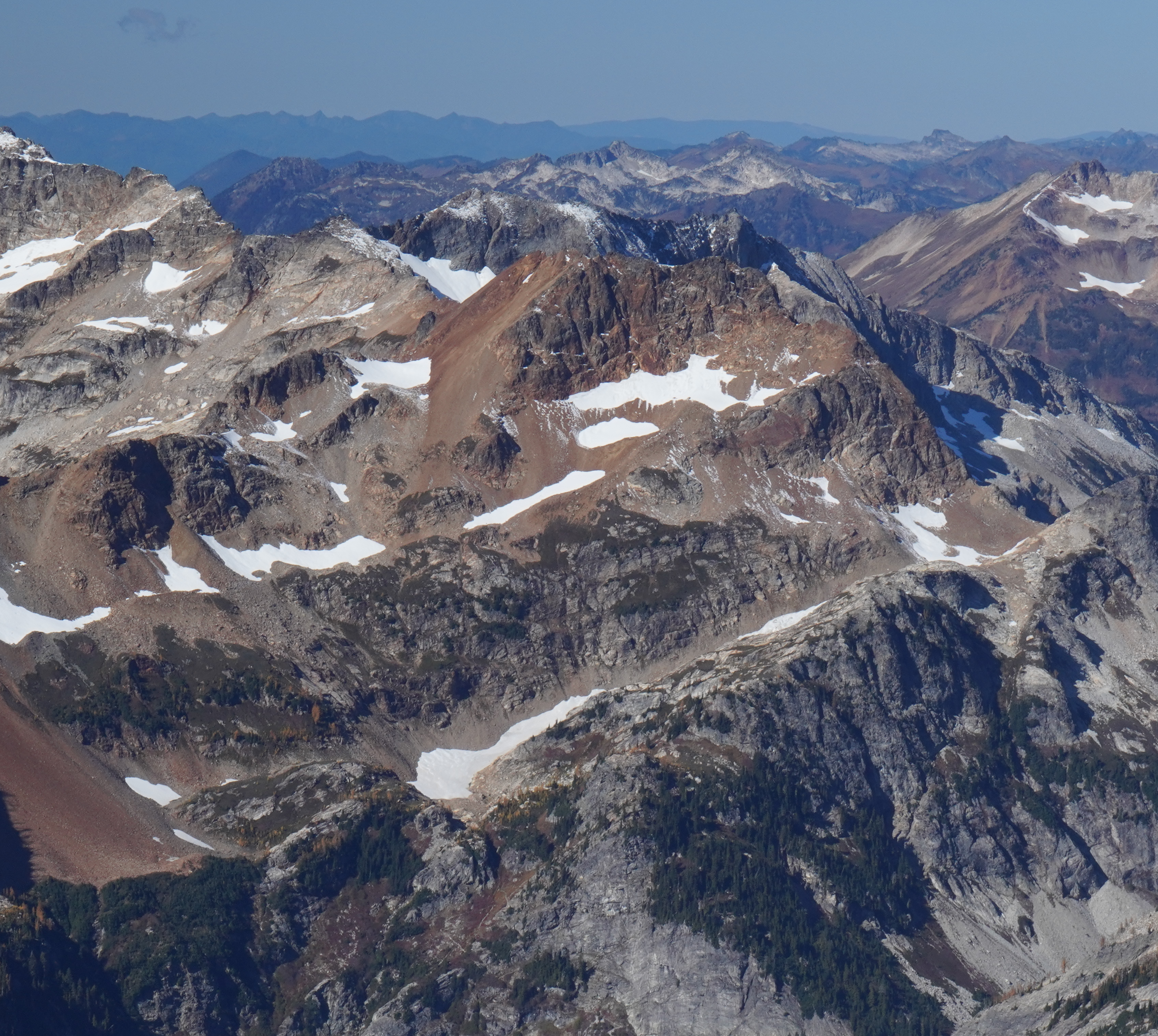
- Spider Glacier (lower foreground) on the slopes of Phelps Ridge viewed from Mount Maude

- Location within Washington (state)
- Type: Mountain glacier
- Location: Chelan County, Washington, U.S.
- Coordinates: 48°09′51″N 120°52′51″W
- Length: .50 mi (0.80 km)
- Terminus: Talus
- Status: Retreating

Spider Glacier is in Wenatchee National Forest in the U.S. state of Washington and is to the east of Phelps Ridge. Spider Glacier is .50 mi (0.80 km) long but very narrow at only 50 ft (15 m) in width. Spider Glacier is .50 mi (0.80 km) southeast of Lyman Glacier.

This Spider Glacier is not to be confused with another of the same name nearby, Spider Glacier (Spider Mountain, Washington).

== See also ==
- List of glaciers in the United States
