= Arête =

Narrow ridge formed by glacial erosion

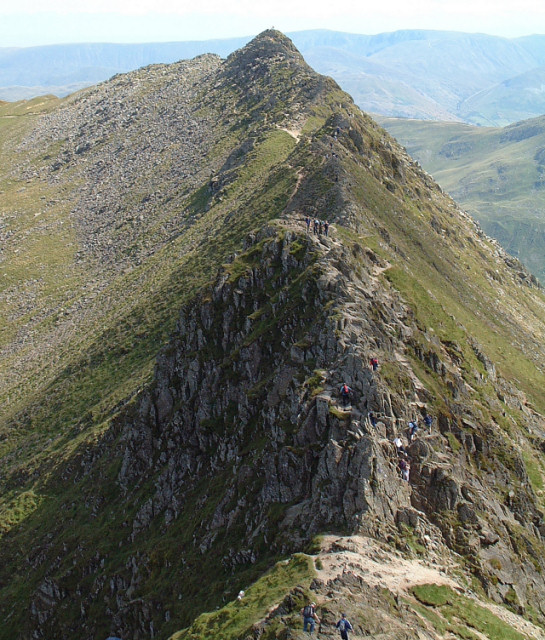
Striding Edge, an arête viewed from Helvellyn with the corrie Red Tarn to the left and Nethermost Cove to the right

An arête (/əˈrɛt/ ə-RET; French: [aʁɛt]) is a narrow ridge of rock that separates two valleys. It is typically formed when two glaciers erode parallel U-shaped valleys. Arêtes can also form when two glacial cirques erode headwards towards one another, although frequently this results in a saddle-shaped pass, called a col. The edge is then sharpened by freeze-thaw weathering, and the slope on either side of the arête steepened through mass wasting events and the erosion of exposed, unstable rock. The word arête is French for "edge" or "ridge"; similar features in the Alps are often described with the German equivalent term Grat.

Where three or more cirques meet, a pyramidal peak is created.

== Cleaver ==
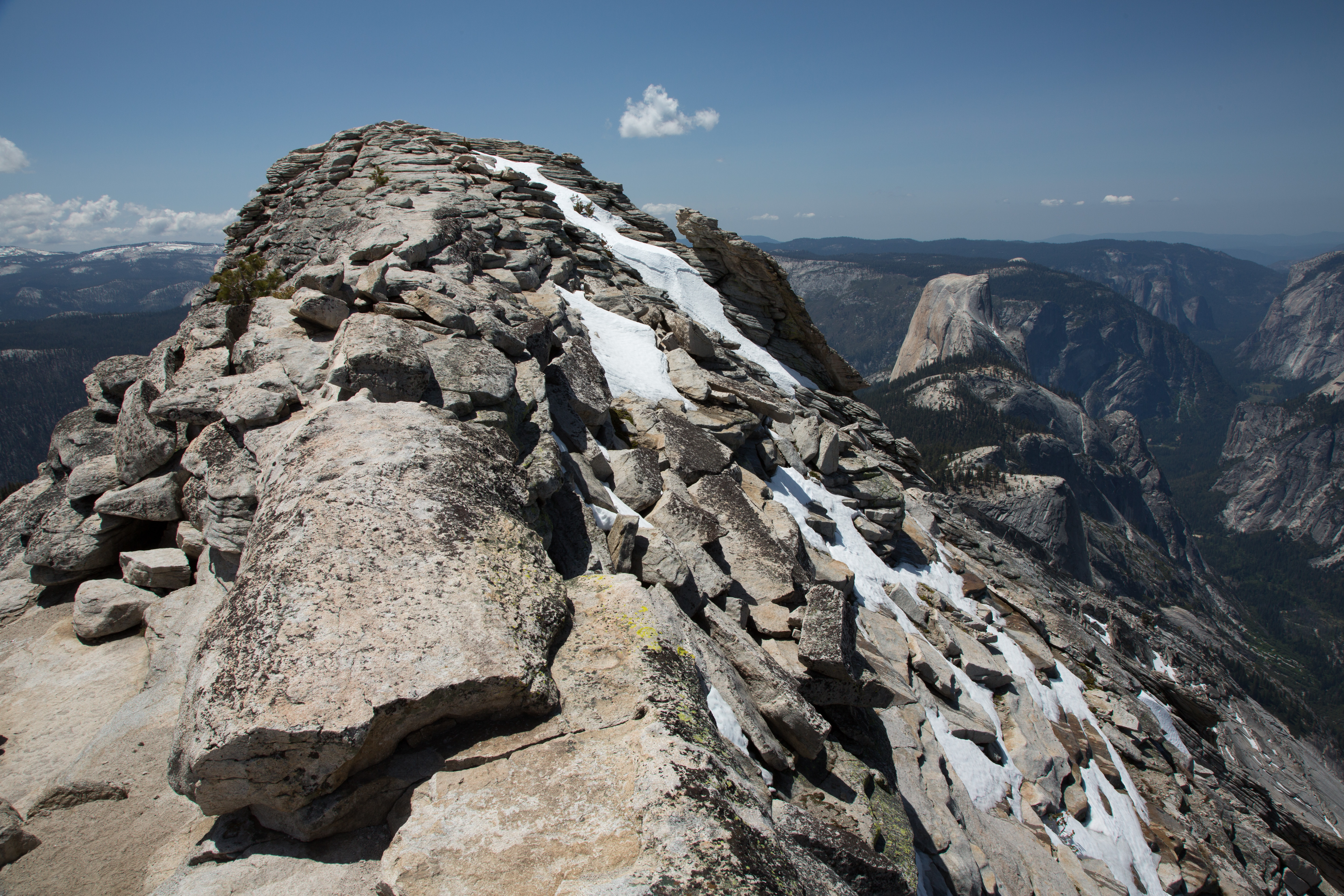
Clouds Rest in Yosemite National Park is an arête.

A cleaver is a type of arête that separates a unified flow of glacial ice from its uphill side into two glaciers flanking, and flowing parallel to, the ridge, analogous to an exposed mid-channel bar in a braided river. Cleaver gets its name from the way it resembles a meat cleaver slicing meat into two parts. A common situation has the two flanking glaciers melting to their respective ends before their courses can bring them back together; the exceedingly rare analogy to which is a situation of two branches of a braided river drying up before recombining.

The location of a cleaver is often an important factor in the choice of climbing routes. For example, following a cleaver up or down a mountain may avoid travelling on or under an unstable glacial, snow, or rock area. This is usually the case on those summer routes to the summit whose lower portions are on the south face of Mount Rainier, where climbers traverse the flats of Ingraham Glacier but ascend Disappointment Cleaver and follow its ridgeline rather than ascend the headwall either of that glacier or (on the other side of the cleaver) of Emmons Glacier.

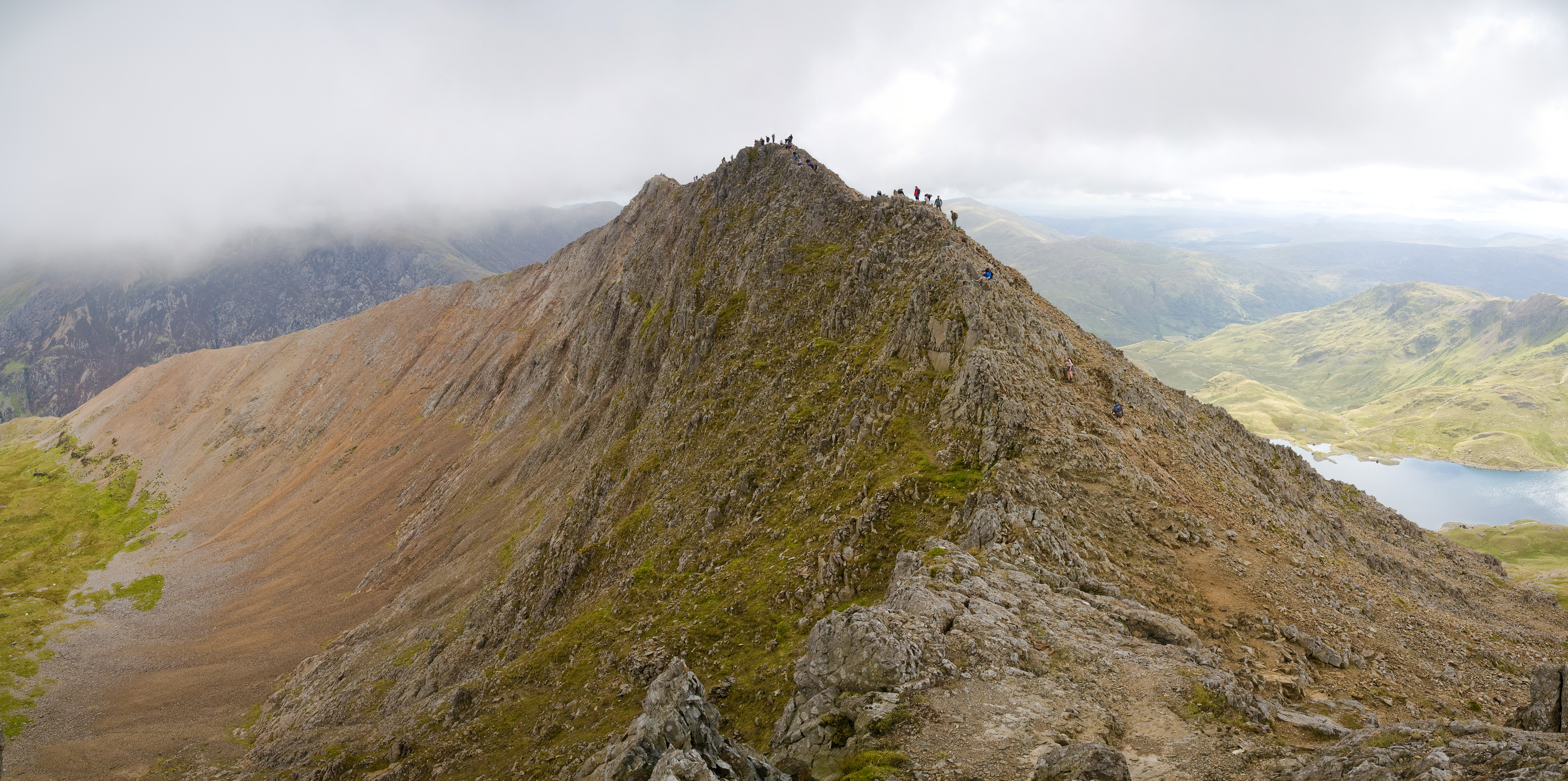
Crib Goch, Snowdonia, is an arête.

== Examples ==
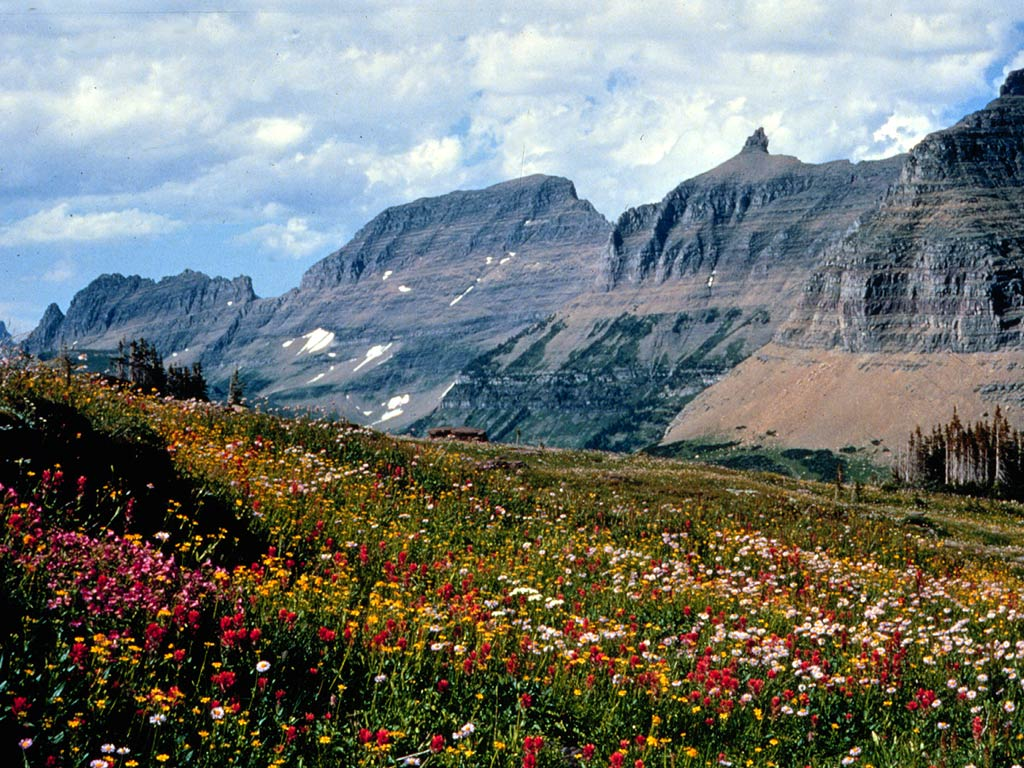
The Garden Wall, an arête in Glacier National Park

Notable examples of arêtes include:

- Beenkeragh Ridge, MacGillycuddy's Reeks, County Kerry, Ireland.
- The Carn Mor Dearg arête on to Ben Nevis, Scotland
- Clouds Rest, in the Sierra Nevada, California
- Crib Goch, in Snowdonia National Park, Wales
- The Garden Wall, in Glacier National Park, Montana (image to right)
- Matthes Crest, in Yosemite National Park, California
- Knife Edge, in Baxter State Park, Maine
- Koncheto, Pirin mountain, Bulgaria
- Mazeno Ridge, Gilgit-Baltistan, Pakistan
- The Minarets, in the Sierra Nevada, California
- The Sawtooth, in the Southern Rocky Mountains
- Strazhite (The guardians), Pirin mountain, Bulgaria
- Striding Edge in the English Lake District
- Trionite (The Saws), Rila mountain, Bulgaria

== See also ==
- Glacial landform – Landform created by the action of glaciers

== Sources ==
- Tarbuck, Edward J.; Lutgens, Frederick K. (2002). Earth: An Introduction to Physical Geography. Upper Saddle River, New Jersey: Prentice Hall. pp. 341–342. ISBN 0-13-092025-8.
