= Dockray, Westmorland and Furness =

Coordinates: 54.586°N 2.941°W

Dockray
- Hamlet
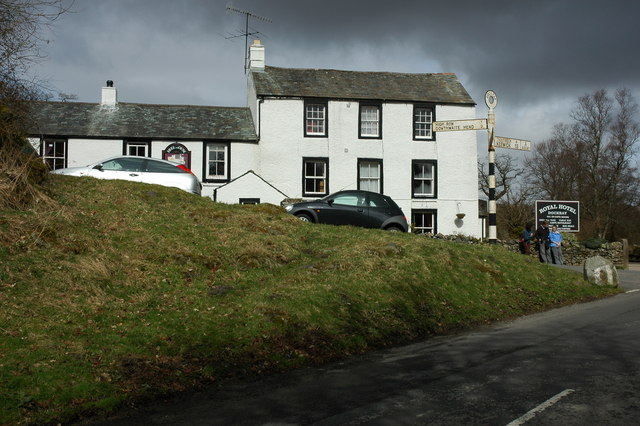
- The Royal Hotel in Dockray

- Location in the former Eden District, Cumbria Location within Cumbria
- OS grid reference: NY393216
- Civil parish: Matterdale
- Unitary authority: Westmorland and Furness
- Ceremonial county: Cumbria
- Region: North West
- Country: England
- Sovereign state: United Kingdom
- Post town: PENRITH
- Postcode district: CA11
- Dialling code: 01768
- Police: Cumbria
- Fire: Cumbria
- Ambulance: North West
- UK Parliament: Penrith and The Border

Dockray (traditionally Dockwray) is a village in the civil parish of Matterdale, in the Westmorland and Furness district of Cumbria, England. In the 2011 census, the parish had 483 residents, roughly an 8% decrease from 526 residents in 2001. Dockray lies approximately eight miles south west of Penrith, and is accessible from the A5091 road.

The village is popular among walkers, mostly to Aira Force, and various fells surrounding the village, most notably Gowbarrow Fell; Alfred Wainwright describes the ascent of Gowbarrow Fell from Dockray, but considers that other ascents are more attractive. The village has no amenities, aside from the Royal Hotel, the local inn and restaurant.

In the Imperial Gazetteer of England and Wales of 1870, Dockwray was described as "a hamlet on the Aira rivulet, adjacent to Matterdale, in Cumberland. It commands a fine view over Ulles-water."

== See also ==
- Listed buildings in Matterdale
