= Ullswater Way =

Waymarked walking route in the English Lake District

Coordinates: 54.611969°N 2.82058°W

The Ullswater Way is a 20-mile (32 km) waymarked walking route around Ullswater in the English Lake District. It was created by a partnership which included The Lake District National Park Authority, the National Trust, Eden District Council, and Ullswater 'Steamers' and was opened on 25 April 2016 by broadcaster and film-maker Eric Robson. The idea of a path circumnavigating the lake had been considered for many years, but the 2015 Cumbria floods which devastated the area gave an incentive for the completion of the project.

The path is recognised by the Long Distance Walkers Association.

The path's symbol, used for waymarking, has a picture of a daffodil; it was on the shore of Ullswater that William Wordsworth saw the flowers which inspired his well-known poem "I Wandered Lonely as a Cloud", often known simply as "Daffodils".

== Route ==
The route is circular and is described anticlockwise from the northernmost point, Pooley Bridge, although it can be walked in either direction from any point, in full or in part. There are connections with buses or boats at several points so the path can be walked as a series of short sections.

From Pooley Bridge the walk passes the Iron Age farmstead of Maiden Castle and Watermillock church, with an optional ascent of Gowbarrow Fell, to reach Aira Force. From here to Glenridding the path is close to the lake shore, passing the spot where Wordsworth saw his inspiring daffodils at Glencoyne Deer Park. The path continues round the south end of the lake and along the more remote eastern shore, passing the hamlet of Sandwick at the foot of Martindale to reach Howtown. Alfred Wainwright described this as "the most beautiful and rewarding walk in Lakeland". The final section offers a low-level option through farmland along the lake shore, or an ascent to The Cockpit, a stone circle on the northern slope of High Street before reaching Pooley Bridge at the end of the lake.

In July 2019 a new walking route, which forms part of the Ullswater Way was launched. The Lowther Castle Loop, is a 7.5 mile circular walk which begins and ends at Lowther Castle and includes points of interest such as the Cop Stone, Askham Hall and the village of Helton

== Poetry Stones ==
In June 2017 three Poetry Stones were unveiled along the route. The stones have been inscribed with lines from the poems of Kathleen Raine, who once lived in Martindale. The stones were carved by Cumbrian artist Pip Hall.
