= Stephen Spring Rice =

Stephen Spring Rice may refer to:

- Stephen Spring Rice (1814–1865), Anglo-Irish civil servant and philanthropist
- Stephen Spring Rice (1856–1902), British civil servant
