= Matterdale =

Civil parish of Cumbria, England

Coordinates: 54.598°N 2.882°W

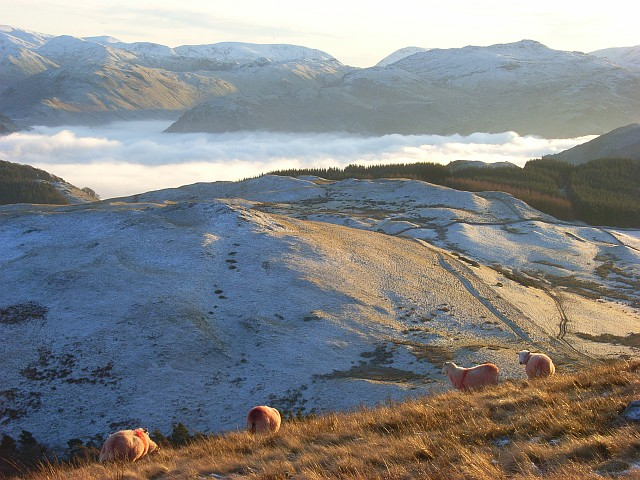
- Sheep on Little Mell Fell

- Location in Eden, Cumbria Location within Cumbria
- Population: 483 (2011)
- OS grid reference: NY4322
- Civil parish: Matterdale
- Unitary authority: Westmorland and Furness
- Ceremonial county: Cumbria
- Region: North West
- Country: England
- Sovereign state: United Kingdom
- Post town: PENRITH
- Postcode district: CA11
- Dialling code: 01768
- Police: Cumbria
- Fire: Cumbria
- Ambulance: North West
- UK Parliament: Westmorland and Lonsdale

Matterdale is a civil parish in the Lake District of Cumbria, England. It lies on the northern shore of Ullswater. The parish includes the settlements of Dockray, Matterdale End, Ulcat row, Watermillock and Wreay. It had a population of 526 in 2001, reducing to 483 at the 2011 Census.

Much of the parish consists of moorland and fells, including Hart Side, Gowbarrow Fell and Little Mell Fell. The "Three Dodds" (Stybarrow Dodd, Watson's Dodd and Great Dodd) lie on the western boundary of the parish. The western part of the parish is drained by Aira Beck, which falls over Aira Force to enter Ullswater. The parish is the setting for James Rebank's 2015 autobiographical book The Shepherd's Life.

== Toponymy ==
Matterdale "is probably 'the valley where bedstraw grows' from old Norse 'maðra' (the cognate of old English 'mæddre') and old Norse 'dalr'..."

== See also ==
- Listed buildings in Matterdale
