= Cecil Spring Rice =

British diplomat and writer

The Right Honourable Sir Cecil Spring Rice GCMG GCVO
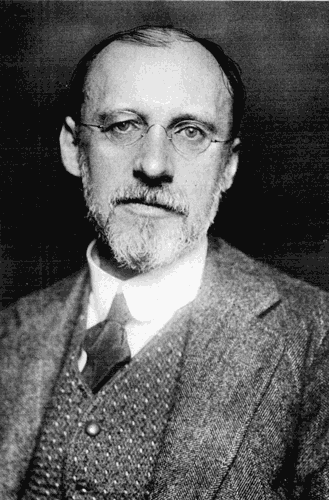

British Ambassador to the United States
- In office 1912–1918
- Monarch: George V
- Prime Minister: H. H. Asquith; David Lloyd George
- Preceded by: James Bryce
- Succeeded by: The Earl of Reading

British Ambassador to Sweden
- In office 1908–1912
- Preceded by: Sir Rennell Rodd
- Succeeded by: Esme Howard

British Ambassador to Persia
- In office 1906–1908
- Preceded by: Sir Arthur Hardinge
- Succeeded by: Sir George Barclay

Personal details
- Born: Cecil Arthur Spring Rice; 27 February 1859 St George Hanover Square, London, England
- Died: 14 February 1918 (aged 58) Ottawa, Ontario, Canada
- Spouse: Florence Caroline Lascelles (m. 1904)
- Children: 2
- Relatives: Thomas Spring Rice, 1st Baron Monteagle of Brandon (grandfather)
- Education: Balliol College, Oxford
- Occupation: Diplomat

Sir Cecil Arthur Spring Rice, GCMG, GCVO (27 February 1859 – 14 February 1918) was a British diplomat who served as British Ambassador to the United States from 1912 to 1918, as which he was responsible for the organisation of British efforts to end American neutrality during the First World War.

He was also a close friend of US President Theodore Roosevelt, and served as best man at his second wedding.

He is best known as the writer of the lyrics of the patriotic hymn "I Vow to Thee, My Country".

== Early life and family ==
Spring Rice was born into an aristocratic and influential Anglo-Irish family. He was the son of a diplomat, The Hon. Charles William Thomas Spring Rice, who was the second son of the prominent Whig politician and former cabinet minister Lord Monteagle of Brandon. Spring Rice's maternal grandfather was the politician William Marshall, and he was a cousin of Frederick Spring. He was the great-grandson of The 1st Earl of Limerick, John Marshall, and George Hibbert. Spring Rice's father died when he was eleven, and he was raised at his mother's family's house at Watermillock on the shore of Ullswater. During his childhood, he was often ill, and he later suffered from Graves' disease, despite maintaining an active lifestyle.

He was educated at Eton and at Balliol College, Oxford, at both of which he was a contemporary and close friend of George Nathaniel Curzon, and at the latter of which he studied under the direction of Benjamin Jowett. Spring Rice rowed for Balliol, and achieved a double first in Classical Moderations (1879) and Literae Humaniores (1881). At Oxford, he was also a contemporary and close friend of John Strachey and Edward Grey. However, Spring Rice contributed, alongside John William Mackail, to the composition of a famous sardonic doggerel about Curzon that was published in The Balliol Masque, and, when British Ambassador to the United States, he was suspected by Curzon of trying to prevent Curzon's engagement to the American Mary Leiter, whom Curzon nevertheless married. However, Spring Rice assumed for a certainty, like many of Curzon's other friends, that Curzon would inevitably become Secretary of State for Foreign Affairs: he wrote to Curzon in 1891, 'When you are Secretary of State for Foreign Affairs I hope you will restore the vanished glory of England, lead the European concert, decide the fate of nations, and give me three months' leave instead of two'.

After completing university, Spring Rice travelled in Europe, where he improved his French, at the time the language of diplomacy. Uncertain about which career to pursue, he took an examination for the Foreign Office and was accepted. Although brought up as an Englishman, Spring Rice maintained a close affinity with Ireland, and he later wrote a poem about his dual Rice (Irish) and Spring (English) roots.

Spring Rice had four sisters and four brothers, two of whom predeceased him: Stephen Spring Rice died in 1902 and Gerald Spring Rice was killed while serving as an officer on the Western Front in 1916.

=== Marriage and issue ===
In 1904, Spring Rice married Florence Caroline Lascelles, the daughter of Sir Frank Cavendish Lascelles and a cousin of the Duke of Devonshire. He had two children with Florence:

- Mary Elizabeth Spring Rice (1906–1994), married Sir Oswald Raynor Arthur in 1935.
- Anthony Theodore Brandon Spring Rice (1908–1954), died unmarried.

== Career ==
=== Early diplomatic career ===
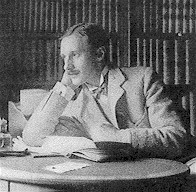
Spring Rice as a young man.

Spring Rice began his career as a clerk in the Foreign Office in 1882. In 1886, he was appointed Assistant Private Secretary to the Foreign Secretary, the Liberal politician Lord Rosebery. Spring Rice was known to be a supporter of the Liberal Party and was sympathetic to the Irish Home Rule movement so he was relieved of his post when the Conservatives came to power later that year. Spring Rice subsequently made the unusual move to the diplomatic service, where he remained for the rest of his life, starting with his first posting to the British legation in Washington, D.C. in 1887.

In 1892 he was posted to Japan, and undertook a tour of Korea with Curzon later that year. While in Japan Spring Rice was instrumental in laying the foundations of the Anglo-Japanese Alliance, which he identified as vital to British interests if Russian expansionism in the region was to be challenged. He left Japan in October 1893 and was posted again to Washington until October 1895, when he was posted to the British embassy in Berlin. During his time in Germany he fell in love with his future wife, Florence Lascelles, the daughter of the then British ambassador. He left Berlin in July 1898, and after spending several months with his family on Ullswater was posted to Constantinople. In May 1899 he was given his first posting to Persia as Secretary of Legation, and he became the British chargé d'affaires in Tehran in March 1900, when the Minister, Sir Mortimer Durand, left for London due to his wife's health. In 1901 Spring Rice was appointed Commissioner of Public Debt in Cairo, where he remained for two years, and in November that year he was promoted to the rank of Secretary of Embassy.

He was appointed First Secretary and Chargé d'Affaires in St. Petersburg in early 1903, and in June of that year began to warn the British government that war between Russia and Japan was becoming increasingly likely. He was still serving in Russia when the Russo-Japanese War began in January 1904, and he corresponded at length with his close friend and confidant President Roosevelt about the United States' mediation in the conflict and the subsequent Treaty of Portsmouth. In January 1905 Lord Lansdowne appointed Spring Rice as the Foreign Office's special representative to the US president. Spring Rice was carrying out the duties of the British ambassador to Russia, who was unwell, during the 1905 Russian Revolution and was involved in the early negotiations which resulted in the Anglo-Russian Entente of 1907.

In September 1906 Spring Rice undertook his first ambassadorial role when he was made British Minister to Persia, before becoming Ambassador to Sweden in 1908.

=== Ambassador to Sweden ===
Upon being appointed ambassador, Spring Rice was instructed by Edward VII to help improve relations between Sweden and Norway following the dissolution of the Union between the two countries in 1905. The primary concern of the British government, however, was the increasingly friendly relations between Sweden and Germany, and the growing diplomatic, cultural and economic influence of Germany in Scandinavia. In a letter to Lord Cranley in May 1909, Spring Rice stated "I suppose you realise that Sweden is in effect a province of Prussia [Germany], not in will but in necessity". He went on to say that "in case of war I think we should regard Sweden as German in effect...". Spring Rice became irritated by what he saw as Sweden's deference to Wilhelm II, and his embassy was involved in an intensifying rivalry between Germany and Britain for control of Sweden's important iron and timber resources. Nonetheless, relations between Sweden and London remained amicable.

In November 1912, after four years in Sweden, it was announced that Spring Rice's next diplomatic posting was to be as ambassador to the United States.

=== Ambassador to the United States ===
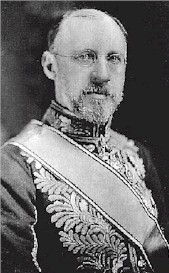
Sir Cecil Spring Rice in court dress.

Spring Rice had long held the ambition of being appointed ambassador to the United States. In his biography of Spring Rice, Stephen Gwynn stated that Spring Rice's main concern, throughout his diplomatic career, was to "improve relations between the two great English-speaking powers". Within the diplomatic service Spring Rice had unique entrée into Washington's corridors of power, and his work alongside President Roosevelt in 1905 led the British government to regard him as a natural choice for ambassador by 1912. The diplomat Sir Ignatius Valentine Chirol observed that Spring Rice's "whole career seems to have been a preparation for the final struggle in Washington".

Within two years of Spring Rice's posting to Washington DC, the First World War had broken out in Europe, and his principal task became that of ending American neutrality. The United States was the largest potential supplier of munitions, arms and food to the United Kingdom and its allies, as well as a potential ally in the war. However, in 1914 public opinion in America favoured neutrality, and Spring Rice had to grapple with the strong anti-British and non-interventionist elements in American politics at the time. Spring Rice also had the complex task of justifying British policies that violated America's rights as a neutral state, such as the monitoring of mail and telegrams and the seizure of contraband at sea. Furthermore, German diplomats under Johann Heinrich von Bernstorff were active in attempting to influence American political opinion against the Allies. Of particular concern to Spring Rice was liaison between German and Irish groups in America, and his embassy was closely involved in gathering intelligence regarding the actions of anti-British spies and informants. He successfully engaged with his many Atlanticist American friends, including Theodore Roosevelt, Henry Stimson and Joseph Hodges Choate, who applied pressure on Woodrow Wilson to abandon neutrality.

In January 1915 Arthur Balfour, the former prime minister, was sent on a mission to convince the United States Congress of Britain's friendship. In a series of meetings, Spring Rice and Consul-General, Sir Courtenay Bennett, were marginalised by the delegation's representatives. Spring Rice and Bennett agreed to support the subsequent Commercial Agreement on the condition that Spring Rice's friend, J. P. Morgan Jr., was appointed as the sole purchasing agent. Spring Rice was able to keep the feeble commission alive, but voiced his concerns that British finances in the United States were reaching a critical point as chaotic credit arrangements by-passed the body set up by parliament to effectuate co-ordination. Spring Rice sent daily wires to London warning that Gold runs would seriously undermine British bank facility, but these were largely ignored. Spring Rice had served as best man at J. P. Morgan's wedding and his influence over the commission was too great for him to be seen as impartial.

As the war went on, Spring Rice's embassy increasingly assumed an advisory role to the many British special delegations which were sent to secure the support of the US government. Spring Rice complained about the limited part he was able to play in the 1915 Anglo-French Financial Commission led by Lord Reading. Spring Rice was also concerned by the large number of private brokers and agents, both with and without official authority, who were operating in the United States on behalf of the government and British businesses. As a result, Spring Rice had to request for the War Office to provide him with an official list of accredited agents, which was reluctantly compiled in late 1914.

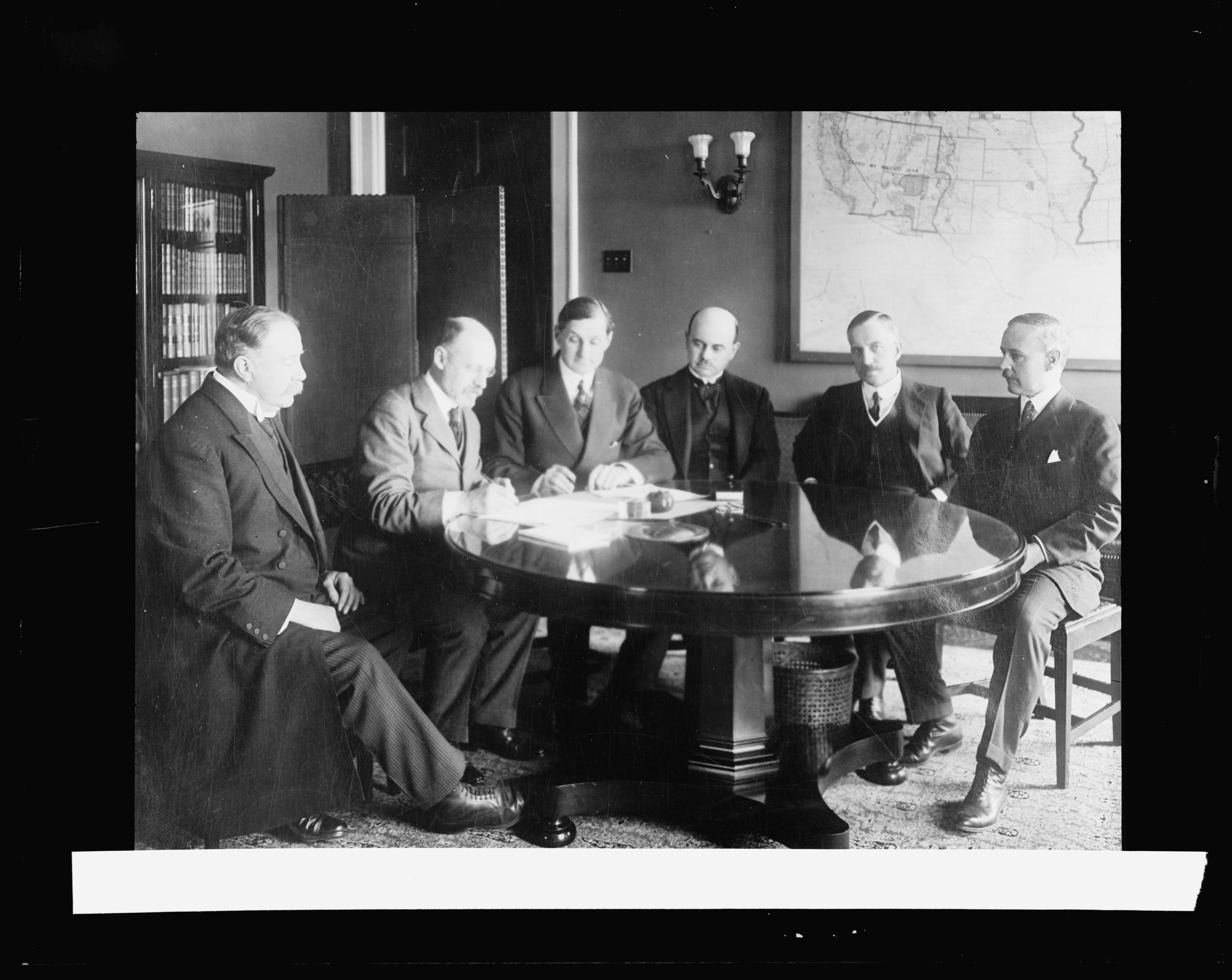
Spring Rice (second from left) signing the third US War Loan to Britain in 1917.

By 1916, the British government was becoming increasingly worried about the Ghadar Party, a US-based political movement which was agitating for rebellion against British rule in India. The American authorities had been reluctant to check the Indian seditionist movement earlier in the war, and fear about the potential political fallout had prevented Spring Rice from pressing the matter diplomatically. However, in February 1916 Spring Rice was ordered to raise the issue with the new US Secretary of State, Robert Lansing. The subsequent Hindu–German Conspiracy Trial uncovered plans to incite an armed revolt in India with German support.

In 1916, Spring Rice constantly sought a reprieve for Roger Casement, citing the danger of protests from Irish Americans, but he also advised political and religious leaders of Casement's "perversion" and the existence of the Black Diaries. In January 1917 he signed the agreement of the third US War Loan to Britain on behalf of his government. Spring Rice's efforts to end US neutrality eventually met with success when the USA entered the conflict on the side of the Allies in 1917. In mid-January 1918, following a disagreement with Lord Northcliffe, the head of the British war mission to America, he was abruptly recalled to London in a one-line telegram. Spring Rice was replaced as ambassador by Lord Reading, who was a direct representative of Britain's war cabinet and had been afforded additional negotiating powers, thus combining the roles previously held by Northcliffe and Spring Rice.

Spring Rice immediately travelled to Canada to begin his journey back to Britain. In Canada, Spring Rice was the guest of his wife's cousin, the Duke of Devonshire, who was at the time serving as Governor General of Canada. Although only 58 and in reasonably good health, Spring Rice unexpectedly died at the viceregal seat, Rideau Hall in Ottawa, a mere three weeks after leaving his post. It is believed that his underlying health condition (Graves' disease) had been exacerbated by exhaustion and stress. It was suggested by his family and close friends that Spring Rice had died of a broken heart following his removal from office, with Henry Cabot Lodge commenting that "the sudden cessation of his work and responsibilities in which his heart was bound up caused him the loss of the will to live". He is buried in Beechwood Cemetery in Ottawa.

=== Assessment of work ===
In The Rise of Theodore Roosevelt, Edmund Morris described Spring Rice as "a born diplomat [who] invariably picked out and cultivated the most important person in any place". He was well respected in London's diplomatic circles, and had a wide network of influential friends in the United States and Britain. The diplomat Sir Malcolm Robertson described Spring Rice as "one of the two or three really brilliant ambassadors whom I have met in thirty years of diplomatic life."

However, Spring Rice's success in turning the earlier close links to the US administration to a relationship of use to his government is debatable. By the end of his appointment, Spring Rice had earned the enmity of his government after becoming paranoid about the threat posed by German spies, and also because of his immense dislike of the many British delegations to Washington that were not under the control of his embassy. Furthermore, Spring Rice's personal connections to many notable Republican politicians was well known, so some members of the Democratic administration of Woodrow Wilson were dubious about trusting him. He was damaged by his association with Roosevelt following the former President's attacks on Wilson for his policy of neutrality and for a lack of military preparedness. Spring Rice found William Jennings Bryan, the Secretary of State, hard to take seriously and disliked having to deal with Edward M. House, Wilson's confidential adviser, who held no official post in the US government. Even so, after his death the British government publicly recognised Spring Rice's extraordinary contribution to the war effort. His untiring attempts to get the United States to join the Allies were evident as well as his success in frustrating the work of the German ambassador, von Bernstorff.

In a speech in the House of Commons in 1919, Lord Robert Cecil said:

"No ambassador has ever had to discharge duties of greater delicacy or of more far reaching importance than fell to his lot. Nor has any ambassador ever fulfilled his task with more unwearied vigilance, conspicuous ability and ultimate success."

== Writings and friendships ==
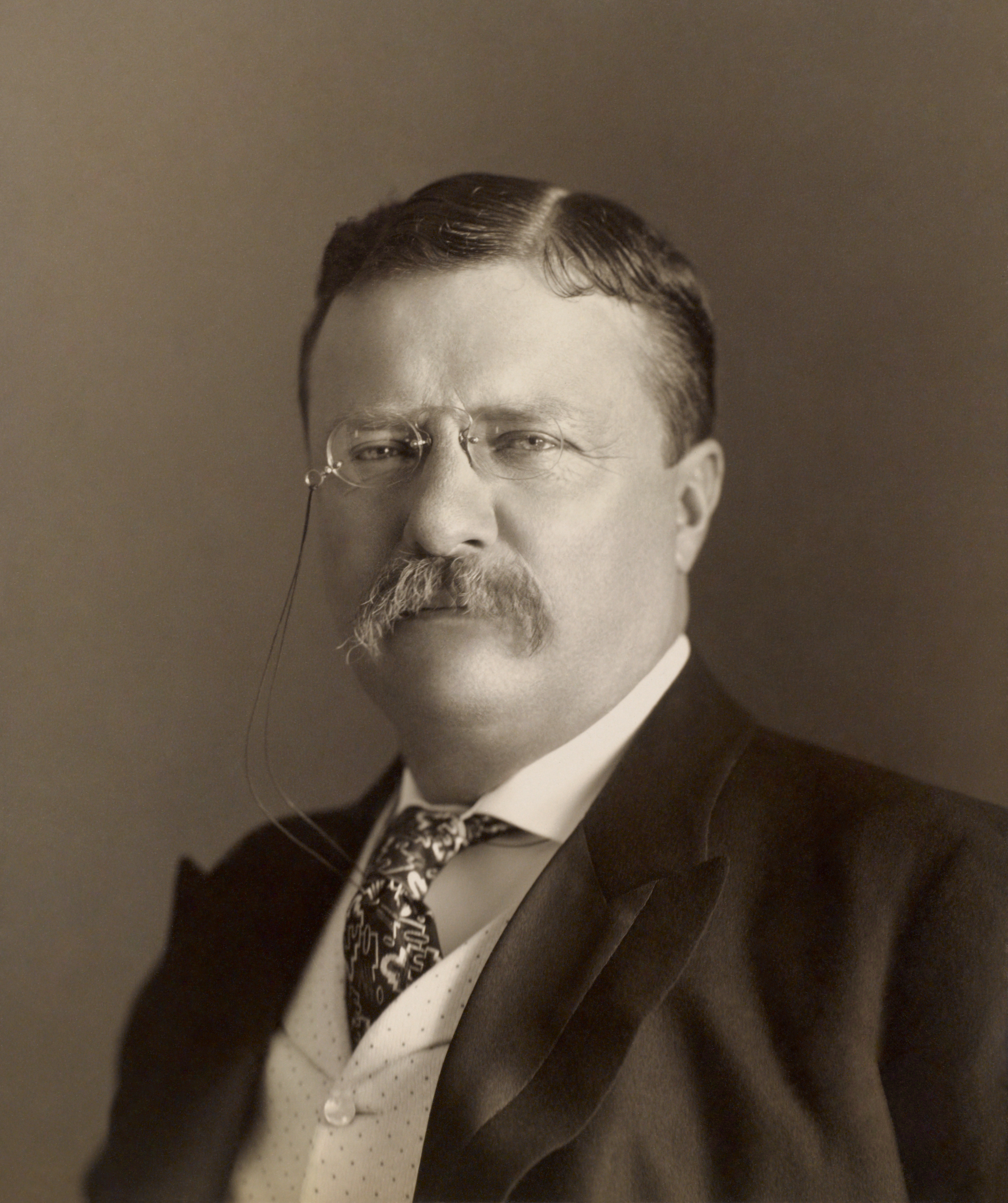
Spring Rice maintained a close friendship with President Theodore Roosevelt and served as best man at his second wedding.

Spring Rice was a poet throughout his adult life. In 1918, he rewrote the words of his most notable poem, Urbs Dei (The City of God) or The Two Fatherlands, to become the text for the hymn I Vow to Thee My Country. The hymn was first performed in 1925, after Spring Rice's death and has since become a widely recognised British anthem. His poetry was published in the 1922 edition of Poems of Today, and has since been published in several other poetry collections.

He became acquainted with Theodore Roosevelt on a trans-Atlantic crossing from New York in 1886, and the two men quickly became close friends and confidants. He has been described as "one of President Theodore Roosevelt's most ardent and loyal admirers" and acted as Roosevelt's best man in Roosevelt's wedding to Edith Carow. Roosevelt became the godfather of Spring Rice's son in 1908. Spring Rice memorably remarked about Roosevelt: "You must always remember that the president is about six". The two men continued to write to each other until Spring Rice's death, and their close relationship undoubtedly added to the latter's diplomatic clout in the US.

He was a close friend of Sir Ignatius Valentine Chirol, a British journalist and later diplomat, and Ronald Munro Ferguson, 1st Viscount Novar, with whom he corresponded for many years. One of his closest political friends was the Irish nationalist, John Dillon; his unwavering sense of duty attempted to overcome his sister's very public espousal of nationalist causes and friendships within the hierarchy of Sinn Féin. The personal moral overtones and private contradictions failed to dent an overwhelming sense of obligation to the British Empire. However it may have informed his uneasy relationship with the Balfour Mission.

A fluent speaker of Persian (as well as German and French), Spring Rice was responsible for translating numerous Persian poems into English. Spring Rice's letters and poems were collected together by his daughter, Lady Arthur, and many are now held by The National Archives. Further papers, relating to his diplomatic postings, and diaries of his travels in Japan, are held by the Churchill Archives Centre.

== Honours and legacy ==
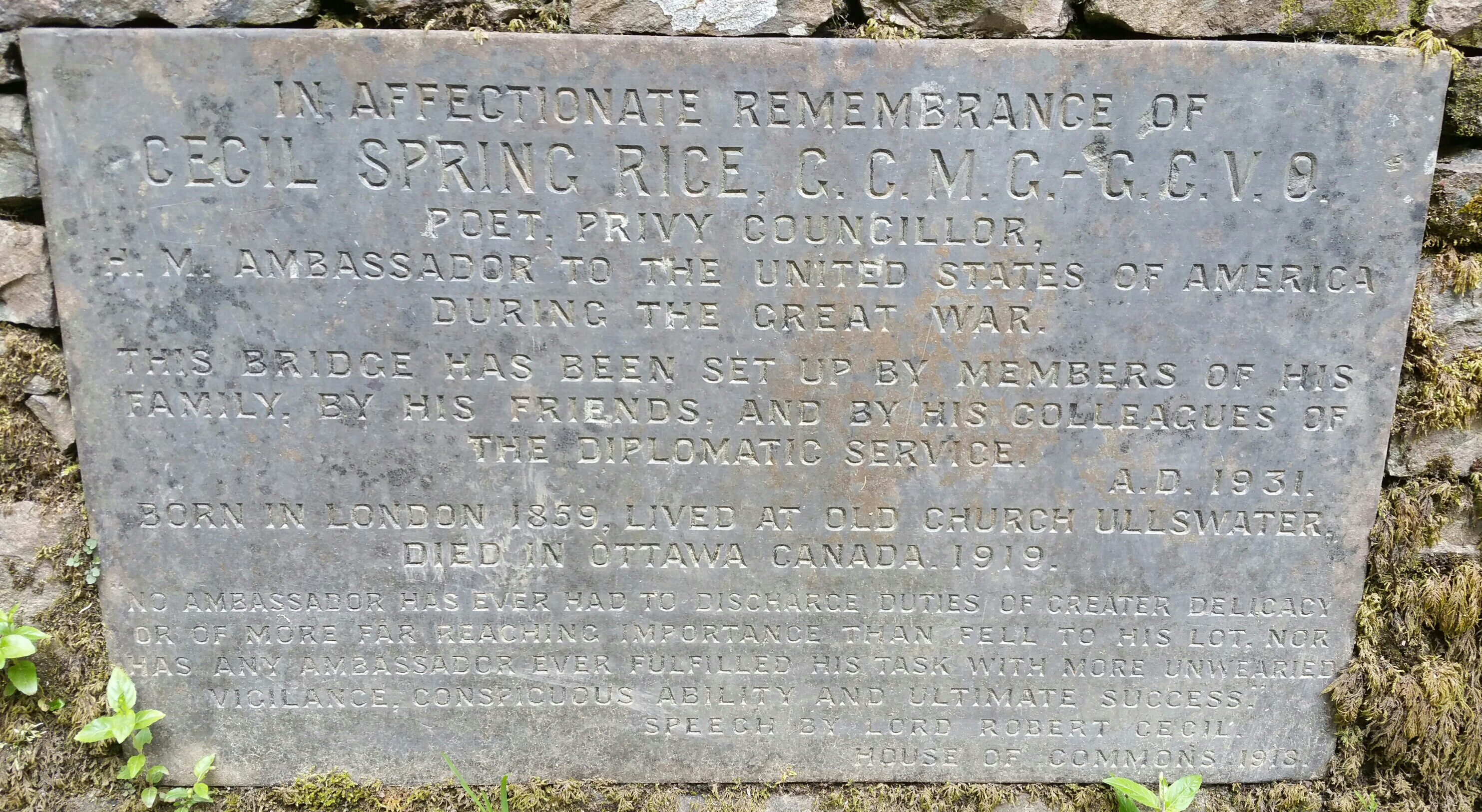
The memorial plaque to Sir Cecil Spring Rice on the lower bridge at Aira Force, Cumbria.

Spring Rice was appointed a Knight Commander Cross of the Order of St Michael and St George on 29 June 1906 and a Knight Grand Cross of the Royal Victorian Order on 17 November 1908. In 1906 he was made a Grand Cordon of Order of the Medjidie. In 1912 he was made a Commander (1st Class) of the Order of the Polar Star and he was made a member of the Imperial Privy Council on 7 March 1913. Spring Rice was going to be offered a peerage upon his return to the United Kingdom, but died before the honour could be proposed.

In his will he left money to Balliol College to found the Cecil Spring Rice Memorial Fund which funds the learning of languages by students who intend to join the diplomatic service. Before his death, Spring Rice gave substantial funds for repairs to be carried out on St Peter and St Paul's Church, Lavenham, the ancestral church of the Spring family.

=== Commemorations ===
Shortly after his death, Spring Rice's family, friends and colleagues erected a bridge to his memory over the waterfall at Aira Force, near his childhood home on Ullswater. All Saints Church, Watermillock, contains a stone memorial tablet to Spring Rice.

In July 2013 a memorial was unveiled by Cecil Spring Rice's granddaughter, Caroline Kenny, at Spring Rice's graveside in Ottawa. The grave was cleaned up and a memorial plaque and ceremony was organised by the then British Consul, Ashley Prime, working in Toronto with support from the Freeman of the City of London (North America). Mount Spring-Rice in British Columbia was named after Spring Rice in 1918 by surveyor Arthur Wheeler.

== See also ==
- Baron Monteagle of Brandon
- "I Vow to Thee, My Country"
- Foreign policy of the Theodore Roosevelt administration
- Foreign policy of the Woodrow Wilson administration

Diplomatic posts
| Preceded by James Bryce | British Ambassador to the United States; 1912–1918 | Succeeded by The Earl of Reading |
| Preceded by Sir Rennell Rodd | British Ambassador to Sweden; 1908–1912 | Succeeded by Esme Howard |
| Preceded by Sir Arthur Hardinge | British Ambassador to Persia; 1906–1908 | Succeeded by Sir George Barclay |
