= All Saints Church, Watermillock =

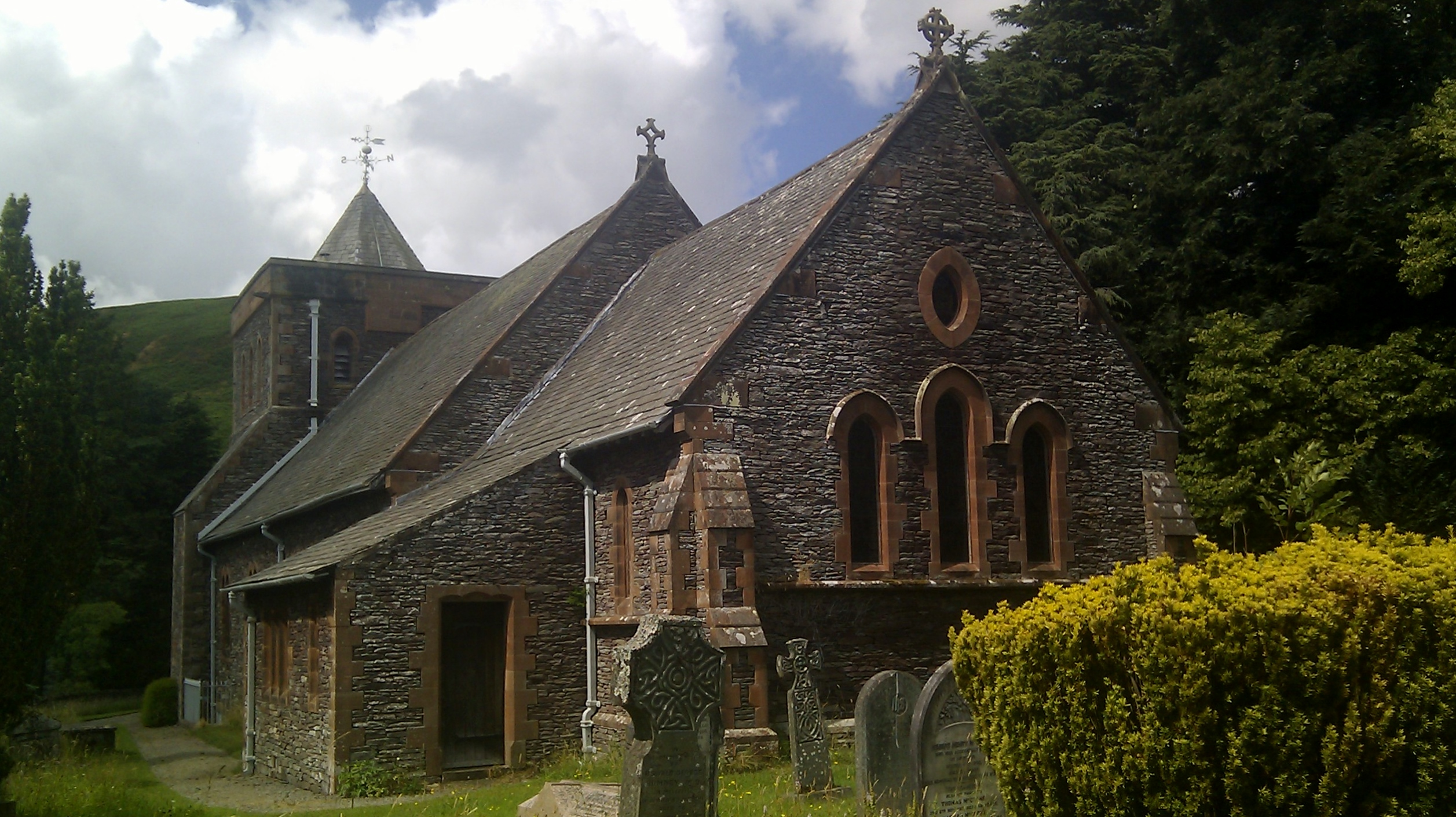
- All Saints Church, Watermillock
- All Saints Church, Watermillock
- 54°35′55″N 2°52′53″W
- OS grid reference: NY 43164 22974
- Location: Watermillock, Cumbria
- Country: England
- Denomination: Church of England

History
- Dedication: All Saints' Day
- Consecrated: 6 January 1882

Architecture
- Heritage designation: Grade II listed
- Architect: C. J. Ferguson
- Completed: 1881
- Construction cost: £2,050

Administration
- Province: York
- Diocese: Diocese of Carlisle
- Archdeaconry: Carlisle
- Deanery: Penrith
- Parish: Watermillock

All Saints Church is a Grade II listed Church of England parish church in the village of Watermillock, Cumbria. It serves the scattered settlement of Watermillock, as well as outlying farms and hamlets on the northern shore of Ullswater.

== History ==
The community's original church, constructed in the 13th century, was located close to the shore of Ullswater on the site of what is now Old Church House. This church was burnt down by Scottish raiders in the 15th century, and a new building was built on the current site and consecrated by Owen Oglethorpe in 1558. In 1880, this church was described as "whitewashed within and without, and walls green with damp. There was a gallery, but no organ, chancel or glass".

The following year, the Tudor church was demolished to be replaced by the current church, constructed of slate and red sandstone. The present nave stands on the foundations of the older church, but the chancel is an addition. In 1884 the church tower was rebuilt to give it its current height. The chancel was built in memory of the Reverend David Pritchard, who was rector from 1876 to 1880. The reredos was installed in 1934, in memory of Mr T.E. Forster. The organ was made by Wilkinson of Kendal in 1888. The choir stalls, pulpit, pews and west end screen, all date from 1881. The communion table was made in 1970.

In 1889, the Spring Rice Window was installed in memory of Lady Farrer (née Evelyn Mary Spring Rice), the widow of Thomas Farrer, 2nd Baron Farrer, who had been born in Watermillock. The church contains stone memorials to Sir Cecil Spring Rice and his brother, Lt. Gerald Spring Rice.

== See also ==
- Listed buildings in Matterdale
