= Stephen Spring Rice (1856–1902) =

Stephen Spring Rice CB
- Born: 28 March 1856; St George Hanover Square, London, England
- Died: 6 September 1902 (aged 46); Dorking, Surrey, England
- Resting place: All Saints Church, Watermillock
- Education: Trinity College, Cambridge
- Occupations: Civil servant; Academic
- Spouse: Julia FitzGerald (m. 1888)
- Children: 2

Stephen Edward Spring Rice CB (28 March 1856 – 6 September 1902) was a British civil servant and academic.

== Background and early life ==
Spring Rice was the son of the Hon. Charles William Thomas Spring Rice, a civil servant in the Foreign Office, and Elizabeth Margaret Marshall. He was the grandson of the Whig politician, Lord Monteagle of Brandon and the brother of the diplomat, Sir Cecil Spring Rice. He was brought up near Watermillock on the shore of Ullswater. Spring Rice was educated at Eton College and Trinity College, Cambridge, and became a fellow of the college in 1879.

== Career ==
He entered HM Treasury in 1878 and was Private Secretary to successive Financial Secretaries to the Treasury between 1881 and 1888. Spring Rice became Private Secretary to Sir William Harcourt when he was Chancellor of the Exchequer for the first time in 1886. In 1894, he became Principal Clerk in the Treasury and was given the additional role of Auditor of the Civil List in 1899.

He was invested as a Companion of the Order of the Bath (CB) and was a contributor to the Encyclopædia Britannica.

== Family ==
Spring Rice married Julia FitzGerald, a daughter of Sir Peter FitzGerald, 19th Knight of Kerry, on 12 January 1888.

Spring Rice died of an illness at Abinger Hall in Dorking on 6 September 1902 at the age of 46 and was buried at All Saints Church, Watermillock. He is also commemorated by a memorial bridge at Aira Force with his brothers Gerald and Cecil.
