= Ulcat Row =

Village in Cumbria, England

Coordinates: 54.595°N 2.919°W

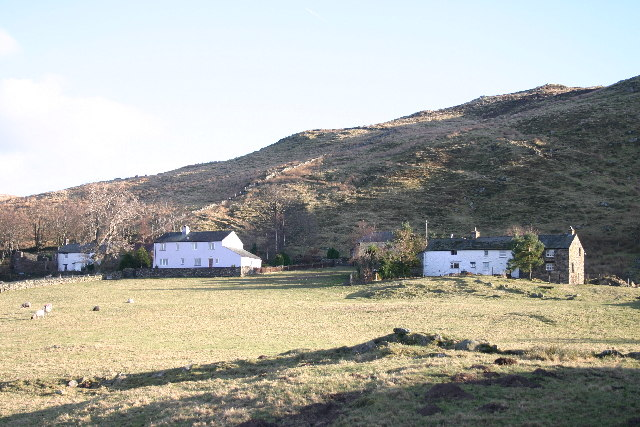
- Ulcat Row

- Location in Eden, Cumbria Location within Cumbria
- OS grid reference: NY406226
- Civil parish: Matterdale
- Unitary authority: Westmorland and Furness
- Ceremonial county: Cumbria
- Region: North West
- Country: England
- Sovereign state: United Kingdom
- Post town: PENRITH
- Postcode district: CA11
- Dialling code: 017684
- Police: Cumbria
- Fire: Cumbria
- Ambulance: North West
- UK Parliament: Westmorland and Lonsdale

Ulcat Row (also Ulcatrow) is a village in the civil parish of Matterdale, in the Westmorland and Furness district, in the county of Cumbria, England. In the 2011 census, the parish had 483 residents, roughly an 8% decrease from 526 residents in 2001. Ulcat Row is located approximately eight miles south west of Penrith. The name originally meant "Owl Cottage Corner".
