= Valentine Chirol =

British journalist, author, historian and diplomat (1852–1929)

Sir Valentine Chirol
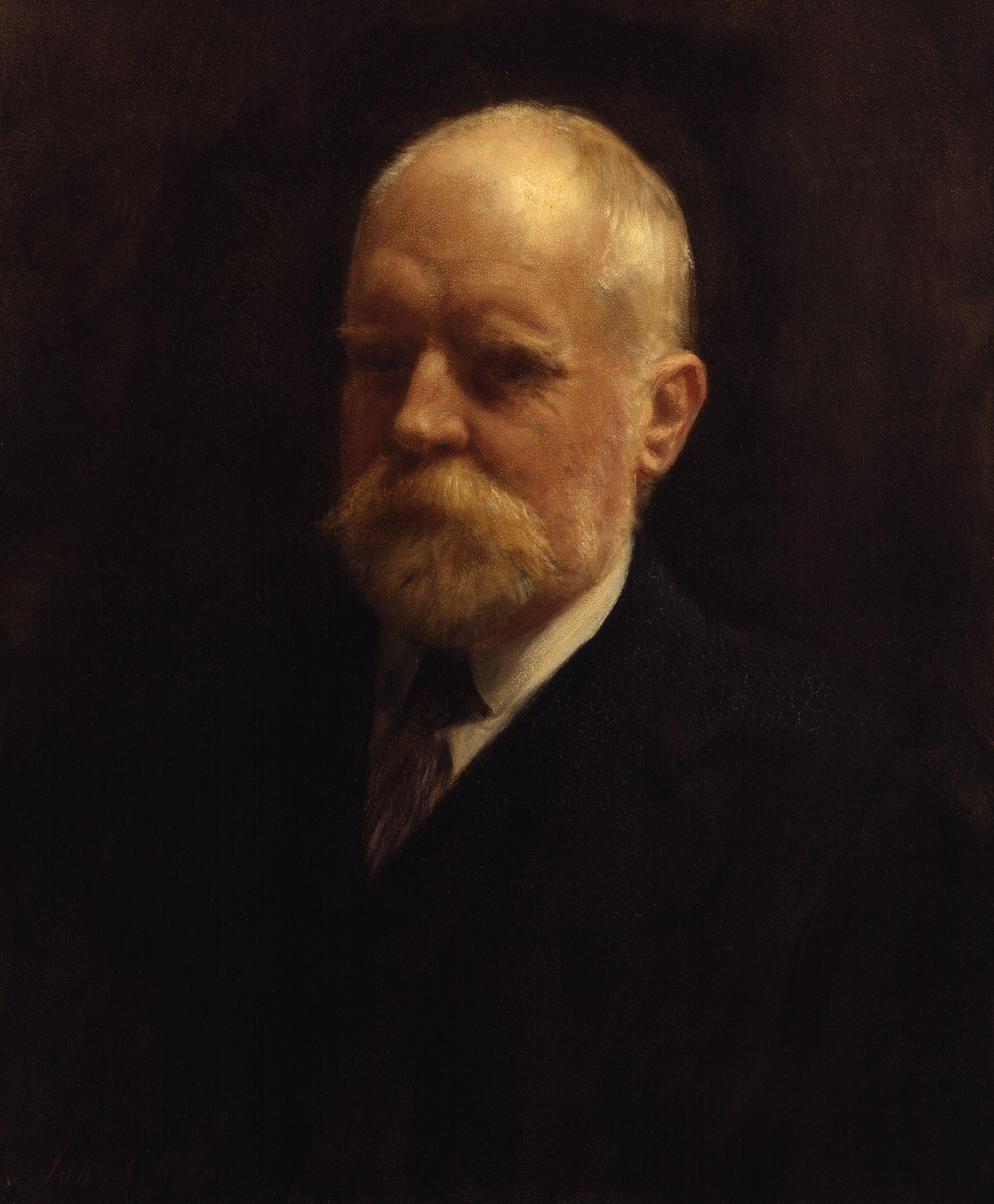
- painted by John Collier at his London studio in 1909.
- Born: 25 May 1852
- Died: 22 October 1929 (aged 77); Carlyle Square, London, England
- Education: University of Paris
- Occupations: Historian, Journalist and diplomat
- Writing career
- Language: English, French and German

Sir Ignatius Valentine Chirol (28 May 1852 – 22 October 1929) was a British journalist, author, historian and diplomat.

== Early life ==
He was the son of the Rev. Alexander Chirol and Harriet Chirol. His education was mostly in France and Germany. Growing up in France with his parents, Chirol lived in the city of Versailles, where he also finished secondary school.

In 1869, the young Chirol, already bilingual, moved to Germany, residing in a small town near Frankfurt am Main. By 1870, the Franco-Prussian War had broken out, which Chirol experienced from both sides. He returned to Paris in 1871, just in time to see the Germans enter the city.

Thanks to his good French and German, he was able to come and go easily passing for a citizen of either side, and he began to acquire his taste for adventure and politics.

Given the chaos in France, the Chirols returned to their family home in Hove. In April 1872, Chirol joined the Foreign Office where he worked for until spring 1876. Unsatisfied with the slow pace of life in the Foreign Office, Chirol returned to travelling where things were much quicker.

Having begun to learn Arabic before he left England, he set off to Egypt arriving in Cairo where he took up residence. In 1879, he set off for Beirut not long after the British had taken control of Cyprus. From there, he travelled inland through Syria with Laurence Oliphant from whom he would later learn to draw. In the Middle East, he took up journalism for the first time, for the Levant Herald, then the leading newspaper in the Near East.

Chirol moved on travelling, to Istanbul and later throughout the Balkans. From the travels came his first book, Twixt Greek and Turk.

== Journalist ==
Chirol began as correspondent and editor of The Times travelling across the globe writing about international events. His first major post was to Berlin in 1892 where he formed many close relationships with the German Foreign Ministry including the Foreign Minister. He lived there until 1896 and reported on Anglo-German relations. Even after returning to London, Chirol travelled back to Berlin and often acted as a backchannel between the English and Germans.

Later, he succeeded Donald Mackenzie Wallace as director of foreign department of The Times in 1899.

Despite being in charge of The Times foreign line, he still managed to travel a great deal. In 1902, he travelled overland to India heading first to Moscow and on to Isfahan, Quetta, Delhi and, finally, Calcutta, where he met with Lord George Nathaniel Curzon. Chirol and Curzon got on quite well, having first met in Cairo in 1895. Chirol was impressed with Curzon's fine governing calling him "a marvellous man for work". Chirol's first visit to India inspired a longtime love for the place to which he would often return throughout his life. Towards the end of his trip, he travelled north to Indore where he stayed with Sir Francis Younghusband.

After returning to London, Chirol continued working on his next book, The Middle Eastern Question, based on a series of 19 articles by Chirol that appeared in The Times in 1902 and 1903. His book helped to bring the term Middle East into common usage. Chirol dedicated the book to his new friend, Curzon, whom he would soon see again. In November 1903 he sailed to Karachi where he boarded a yacht to tour the Persian Gulf with Lord and Lady Curzon. Other notable guests on the voyage included a young Winston Churchill. Chirol returned to London by Christmas and just as the Russo-Japanese War was breaking out. He later travelled to Washington D.C., where he met with Theodore Roosevelt and many members of the US Congress, facilitated by his close friend, Sir Cecil Spring Rice.

After two decades as a journalist he retired from The Times on 21 December 1911 and was knighted shortly thereafter, on 1 January 1912, for his distinguished service as a foreign affairs advisor. He rejoined the Foreign Office as a diplomat and was soon on his way to the Balkans as World War I broke out.

== World War I ==
Travelling through Greece, Macedonia, Bulgaria, Serbia and Romania, Chirol, along with J.D. Gregory, met with foreign officials and heads of state to help convince them to join the Allied side. In addition, he wrote a stern critique of the Foreign Office's failings in the region, including the ongoing quagmire at Gallipoli.

Deprecatory comments in Chirol's book, Indian Unrest, resulted in a civil suit being brought against him in London by Bal Gangadhar Tilak, in the Indian independence movement. Although Tilak ultimately lost the suit, Chirol ended up spending almost two years in India on account of it, missing the bulk of World War I.

== Later life ==
He later travelled to Paris as part of a government delegation whose job it was to work on terms of peace. Though no longer formally with the newspaper, Chirol continued to write articles occasionally and maintained his wide range of journalistic and diplomatic contacts.

In 1924, he travelled to the United States on a lecture tour and he spoke about the growing problems between the Occident and the Orient and warned against American isolationism, which he greatly feared. He spent the remainder of his retired life travelling the world to places like Morocco, Egypt, South Africa and, especially, India. In addition, he published a number of other books.

Chirol died in London in 1929 and was missed by many. Major-General Sir Neill Malcolm called him the "friend of viceroys, the intimate of ambassadors, one might almost say the counsellor of ministers, he was [also] one of the noblest characters that ever adorned British journalism". He was buried in the Brighton Extra Mural Cemetery.

== Bibliography ==
- Twixt Greek and Turk (1881)
- The Far Eastern Question (1896)
- The Middle Eastern Question (1903)
- "Our Imperial Interests in Nearer and Further Asia" . The Empire and the century. London: John Murray. 1905. pp. 728–59.
- Pan-Islamism. Proceedings of the Central Asian Society. London : Central Asian Society. 1906.
- Indian Unrest (1910)
- Serbia and the Serbs (1914)
- Germany and the fear of Russia (1914)
- Cecil Spring Rice: In Memoriam (1919)
- The Legal Proceedings in the Case of Tilak V. Chirol and Another: Before Mr. Justice Darling and a Special Jury, January 29th 1919-February 21st 1919, Volume 2. (1919) with Bal Bangadhar Tilak.
- The End of the Ottoman Empire (1920)
- The Egyptian Problem (1921)
- India; Old and New (1921)
- The Boer War and the International Situation, 1899-1902 (1923)
- Occident and the Orient; lectures on the Harris Foundation (1924)
- Chirol, Valentine; Tsurumi, Yusuke; Salter, James Arthur (1 September 1925). "The Reawakening of the Orient, and Other Addresses". Journal of the British Institute of International Affairs. 4 (5).
- India (1926)
- Fifty years in a changing World (1927)
- With Pen and Brush in Eastern Lands (1929)

== See also ==
- Ernest Mason Satow who mentions Chirol several times in his diaries, 1895–1906.
