= Gowbarrow Fell =

Fell in Cumbria, England

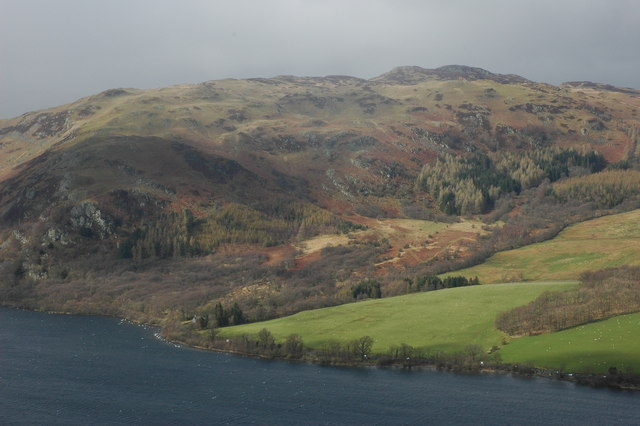
- Gowbarrow Fell, seen from the summit of Hallin Fell, on the other side of Ullswater

Highest point
- Elevation: 481 m (1,578 ft)
- Prominence: 100 m (330 ft)
- Parent peak: Little Mell Fell
- Listing: Wainwright
- Coordinates: 54°35′20″N 2°55′03″W

Naming
- English translation: Windy hill
- Language of name: Old Norse

Geography
- Location within the Lake District
- Location: Cumbria, England
- Parent range: Lake District, Eastern Fells
- OS grid: NY408219
- Topo map: OSExplorer OL5, Landranger 90

Gowbarrow Fell (Windy hill) is a low fell in the English Lake District. It is an outlier of the Eastern Fells, standing to the north of Ullswater, bounded on one side by Aira Beck with its waterfall Aira Force. The waterfall is a popular attraction for visitors to the area.

In previous centuries the fell was part of a medieval hunting-park, Gowbarrow Park, which belonged to the lords of Greystoke. The fell, along with 750 acres of the park, were bought by the National Trust in 1906.

== Topography ==
The fell is a wedge-shaped piece of high ground, about 2 km by 1.5 km in extent. The highest parts are on a short ridge which extends from Norman Crag in the north-west corner (above Thorneythwaite Farm), over Airy Crag, the actual summit (481 m), several other knolls, Green Hill (437 m) and down to Yew Crag in the south-east corner.

A north-east trending ridge parallel to Ullswater continues the high ground over the subsidiary tops of Great Meldrum (437 m), Little Meldrum (404 m) and Watermillock Fell (424 m, unnamed on Ordnance Survey maps) to connect with Little Mell Fell at a col called The Hause (c. 380 m). To the north west another low col (c. 280 m) near Baldhowend Farm connects Gowbarrow Fell to the easterly trending ridge from Great Dodd via High Brow and Cockley Moor.

Gowbarrow Fell is bounded by Aira Beck on the west which separates it from Watermillock Common and the foothills of Hart Side. This flows down from the rolling fells of the Dodds, through the village of Dockray, and then turns south into Ullswater. The beck drops 140 m between Dockray and the lake over a number of waterfalls, including High Force and Aira Force. Aira Force is one of the most photogenic sites in the Lake District. The falls and the main body of the fell are owned by the National Trust. The site has easy access from the A592 road and a series of paths with two stone bridges at the head and foot of the falls make it a popular place with visitors.

To the north the fell is bounded by a basin of low land, drained by tributaries of the Thackthwaite Beck, through the gap between Great and Little Mell Fells, and then via the Dacre Beck into the River Eamont.

To the south the fell is bounded by Ullswater. The southern slopes of the fell are wooded, providing a picturesque backdrop for views over Ullswater. Above this is a fringe of rock, the main feature being Yew Crag at the south-eastern corner of the fell. The woodlands and crags continue eastwards beneath Great and Little Meldrums. The rocky spur of Gate Crags and Birk Crag juts out from Little Meldrum toward the lake. To the east the fell is bounded by lower land which drains directly into Ullswater.

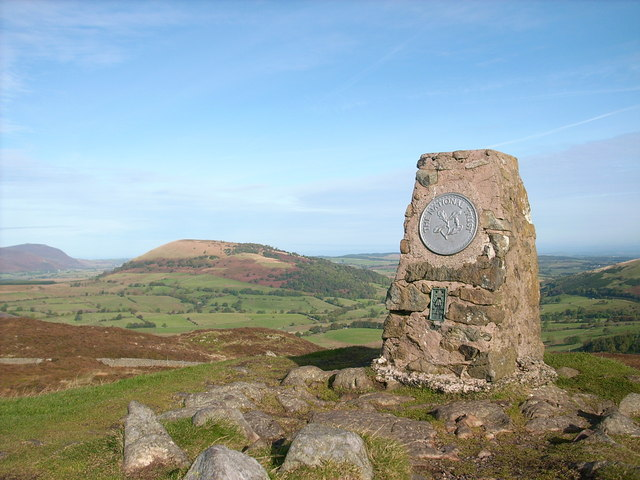
Triangulation pillar on the summit of Gowbarrow Fell, with Great Mell Fell beyond

== Summit ==
The top of the fell is a broad plateau with a number of small rocky knolls rising above areas of heather and bog.

The summit is the rocky Airy Crag, on which an Ordnance Survey triangulation pillar has been built. This now bears a National Trust plaque, reflecting the ownership of the land. Views from here include the two Mell Fells, Blencathra and the Northern Fells, and the northern parts of the Helvellyn range including the Dodds. This summit is set back to the north of the fell, about 1.6 km from the shore of Ullswater, limiting views of the lake though the fells beyond it and up the Patterdale valley can be seen.

Alfred Wainwright described the summit as "drab". Instead, better views of Ullswater may be had from Green Hill (437 m), the southern summit.

== Ascents ==
Gowbarrow Park is owned by the National Trust and is Open Access land. Quite a number of paths lead up and around the fell, and access to the fell may be gained from a number of places around its perimeter. As a result, quite a variety of routes is possible on the fell.

The main National Trust pay-and-display car park on the A592 road (at its junction with the A5091) has facilities and is popular with visitors heading for Aira Force. Two other (free to NT members) car parks along the A5091 road also give access to the waterfall and the fell. From the village of Dockray a public footpath begins opposite the Royal Hotel and gives the shortest route to the summit (1 mile). Another footpath begins at Ulcat Row to the north of the fell.

A track from The Hause, where some car parking is possible, gives access from the east via Great Meldrum. Another approach from the east is the Kirkstile footpath, from the minor road above Watermillock church. This path runs below Little and Great Meldrum, through the conifer plantation in Swinburn's Park, and then contours along the steep eastern and southern slopes of the fell, giving delightful views over Ullswater on its way to Aira Force.

It is also possible to approach from the south, from a very tiny layby on the A592 road, and up Yew Crag.

== Geology ==
The rocks of Gowbarrow Fell were formed during the Ordovician period, roughly 460 million years ago. Two major groups of Ordovician rocks are represented on and around the fell: the Skiddaw Group and the Borrowdale Volcanic Group.

On the lower ground around the southern and eastern edges of the fell, faulting has exposed an inlier of mudstones from the Skiddaw Group. These rocks of the Tarn Moor Formation were formed in deep seas when occasional slides of coastal sediments were redeposited at greater depth.

The higher ground of the fell is composed of flows of andesite lava, belonging to the Birker Fell Andesite Formation, a part of the Borrowdale Volcanic Group. These rocks are part of a thick succession of lava sheets found around the western and northern sides of the Lake District. They were formed by eruptions of mobile lava from shallow-sided volcanoes. They are a little younger than the Skiddaw mudstones, which they overlie.

The oldest of the volcanic rocks, at the base of the Birker Fell formation, occur uniquely on Little Meldrum and to the south of it, along the western edge of Birk Crag. These belong to the Little Meldrum Tuff Member, and were formed as volcanic ash, some with droplets of lava among it, was thrown out of volcanoes during explosive eruptions of viscous and highly gaseous magma. The result is tuff and lapilli tuff, with volcanic pyroclasts from the Skiddaw Group.

== Names ==
Gowbarrow Fell: 'Fell' seems to have been a later addition to the fell's name, which was recorded as Golbery (about 1250) and Golebergh (1294). This probably means 'windy hill' from Old Norse gol, 'a gust of wind, a breeze', and Old Norse berg, 'a rocky hill'.

Fell is a local dialect word with several meanings, from either Old Norse fell, 'hill, mountain', or Old Norse fjall, 'mountainous country'. Fell is very common in Lake District place-names, some of which are ancient, but many are much more modern.

== History ==
Gowbarrow Fell stands within Gowbarrow Park, a medieval hunting park and part of the lands of Greystoke Manor.

Greystoke was granted to Forne, son of Sigulph, by king Henry I (reigned 1100 to 1135), according to a testament dated 1212. It is not clear whether this was a new grant, or a reconfirmation of Forne's existing holding of lands held by his father Sigulph in pre-Norman times. Forne's daughter Edith was one of Henry I's mistresses, and his son Ivo built the first stone tower at Greystoke Castle in 1129.

In a source of 1418 Matterdale was referred to as 'a forest', that is 'a hunting ground.'

The Howard family succeeded to the estate of Greystoke in 1571. The land appears to have remained a hunting ground, for in the late seventeenth century a visitor remarked that it contained more deer than trees. William Hutchinson recorded in 1794 that the Park covered about 2000 acres and was stocked with six or seven hundred head of fallow deer Crosthwaite's map of 1783 shows the boundaries of the park extended from Gowbarrow Hall to Glencoyne Bay. The high stone wall surrounding this land is still in good repair.

A century later, Charles Howard, the 11th Duke of Norfolk, built Lyulph's Tower as a hunting lodge not far from Aira Force, on the site of a former Pele Tower. Its name is probably a form of Sigulph (other variants include Ulf, L'ulf, Lyulph, Ligulf), the ancestral owner of the land, from whom the lake, Ullswater, may also be named.

William Wordsworth walked through the park at Gowbarrow with his sister Dorothy on 15 April 1802. She was struck by the daffodils growing on the west side of Gowbarrow, beside the shore in Glencoyne Bay, and in her Grasmere Journal she wrote: 'When we were in the woods beyond Gowbarrow park we saw a few daffodils close to the water side ... I never saw daffodils so beautiful ...' Her words inspired William to write his poem, I wandered lonely as a cloud (often known as Daffodils) two years later. William also wrote three poems inspired by Aira Force, including The Somnambulist.

The Howard family landscaped Gowbarrow Park during the nineteenth century, planting over half a million trees, building bridges and creating paths around Aira Force. In 1846 they planted an arboretum below the waterfall.

Then in 1906 the National Trust acquired 750 acres of the Park to safeguard it from proposed house building.

The fell is grazed by sheep rather than deer today, but evidence of former deer hunting remains in the substantial stone wall surrounding the fell, as well as old shooting boxes and stalkers' huts.

== Image gallery ==
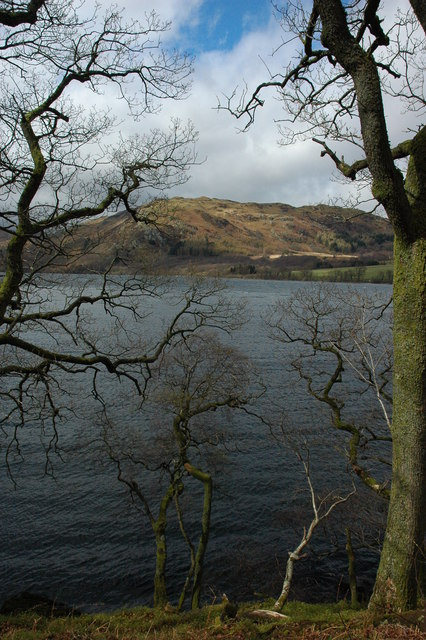
Gowbarrow Fell, seen from the opposite shore of Ullswater.

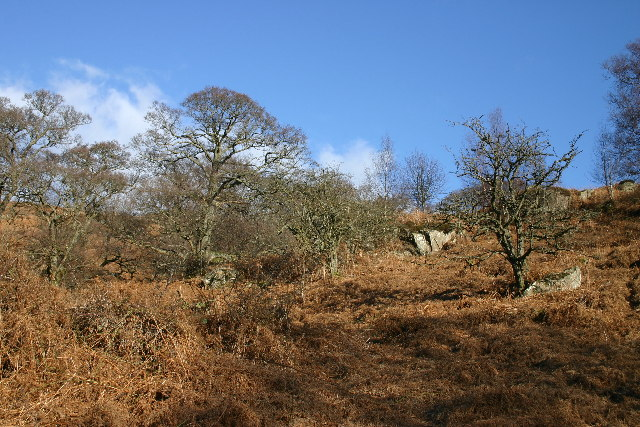
Part of the fellside on Gowbarrow Fell

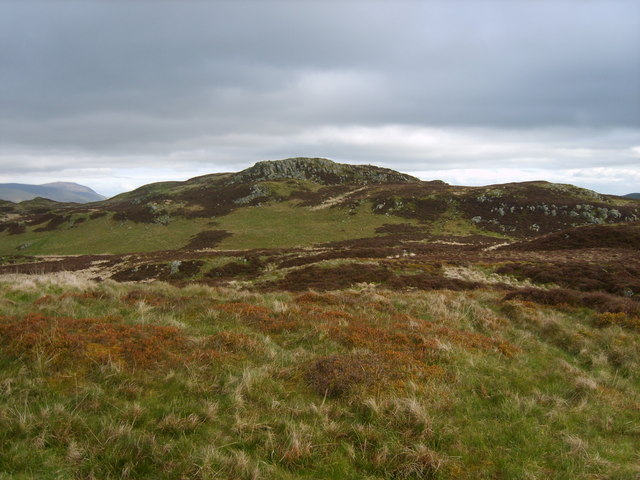
On top of Gowbarrow Fell, looking towards Airy Crag.

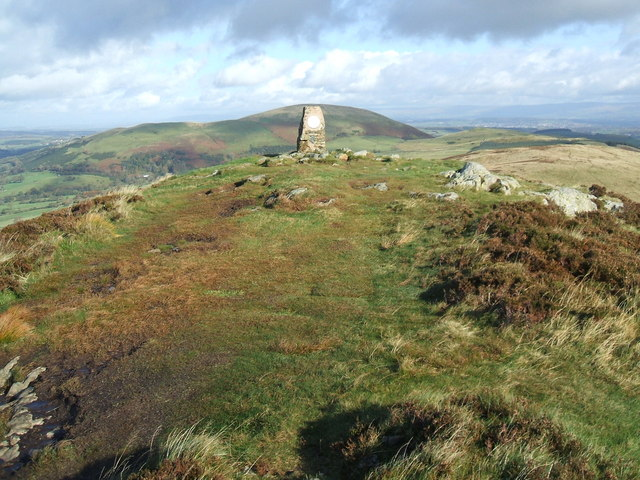
The summit of Gowbarrow Fell, with trig point.

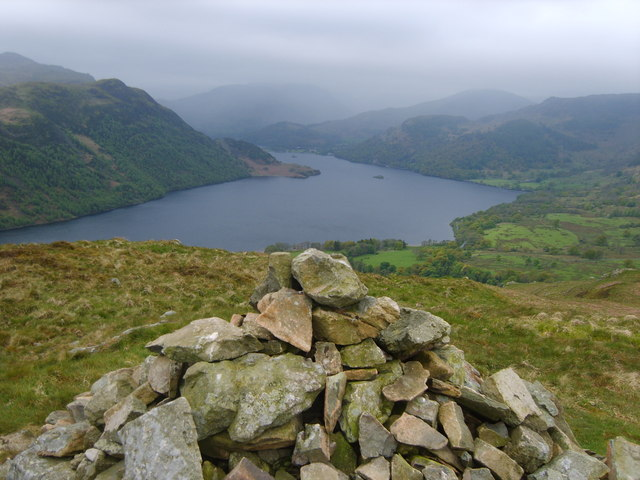
View of Ullswater from the cairn on Green Hill

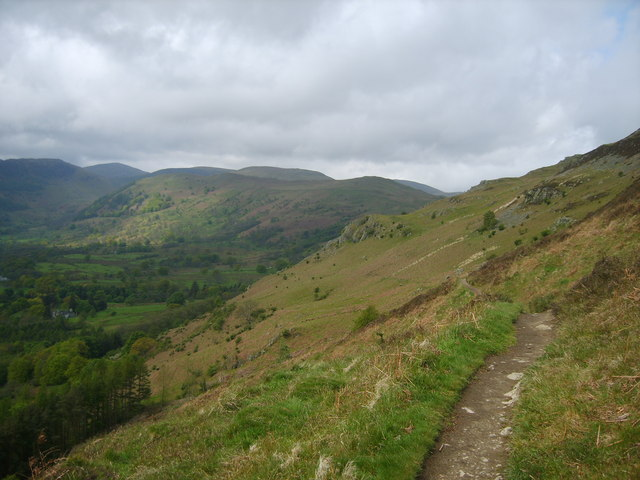
The footpath beneath Green Hill

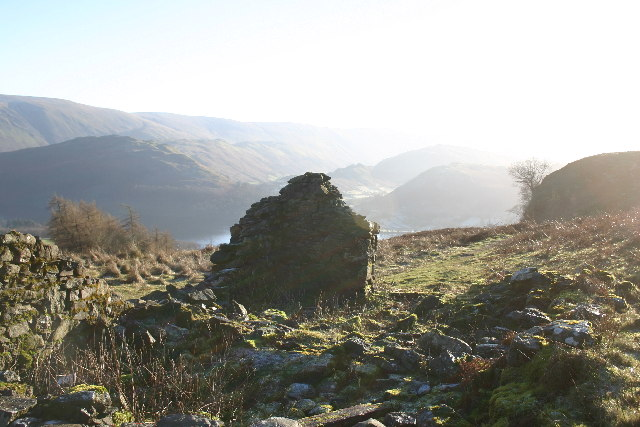
The remains of an old shooting lodge

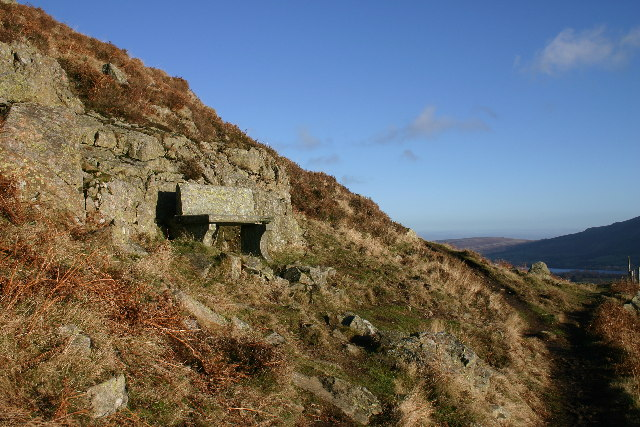
The memorial seat on Gowbarrow Fell. The inscription reads, "A thank-offering 1905"

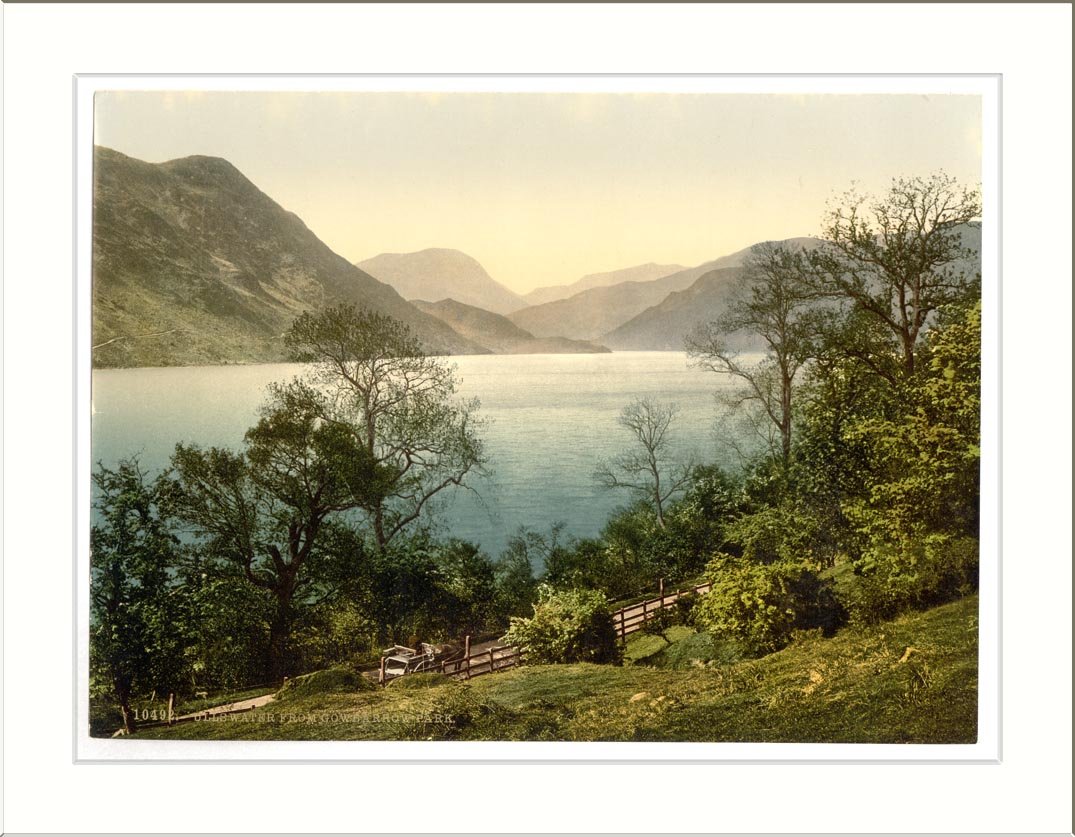
The view of Ullswater from Gowbarrow - a photochrom print

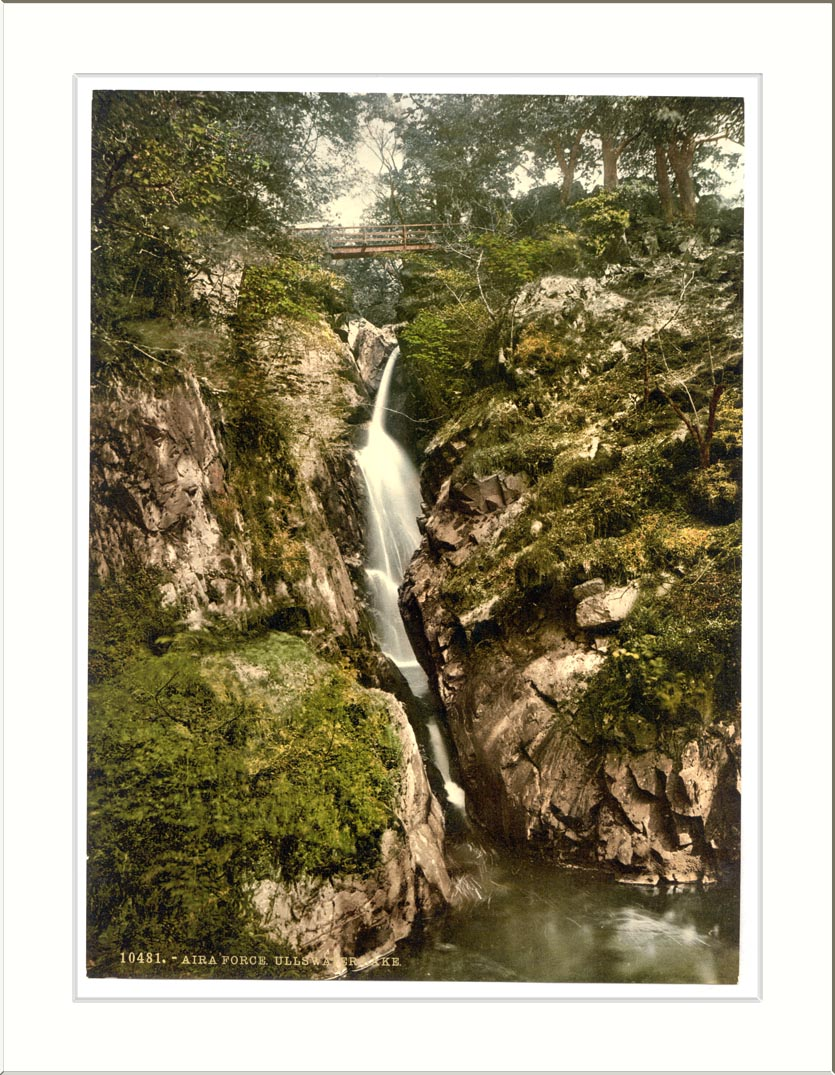
Aira Force - another photochrom print
