= Watermillock =

Village in Cumbria, England

Coordinates: 54.594°N 2.859°W

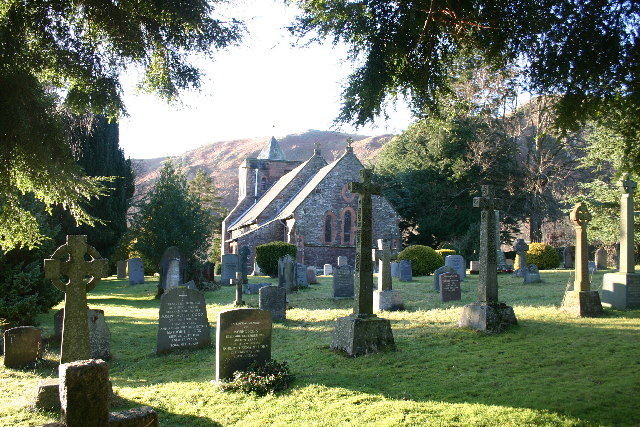
- Parish Church of All Saints, Watermillock

- Location in Eden, Cumbria Location within Cumbria
- OS grid reference: NY445224
- Civil parish: Matterdale
- Unitary authority: Westmorland and Furness
- Ceremonial county: Cumbria
- Region: North West
- Country: England
- Sovereign state: United Kingdom
- Post town: PENRITH
- Postcode district: CA11
- Dialling code: 017684
- Police: Cumbria
- Fire: Cumbria
- Ambulance: North West
- UK Parliament: Westmorland and Lonsdale

Watermillock is a village and former civil parish, now in the parish of Matterdale, in the Westmorland and Furness district, in the ceremonial county of Cumbria, England. It is on the western shore of Ullswater, in the English Lake District. In 1931 the civil parish had a population of 448. On 1 April 1934 the civil parish was merged into Matterdale.

== Toponymy ==
The name Watermillock is first attested in the early thirteenth century, in the form weþermeloc, with wethermelok first found in 1253. The present-day form, beginning with water, is first attested in 1541, as Wattermannock, alongside a 1568 instance of Waltermannock. The meloc element derives from the Common Brittonic word that would, if it were still found in modern Welsh, be spelled moelog, meaning "place associated with the Mell Fells" (whose own name comes from the word that survives in modern Welsh as moel "bare"). The first element of the name originated as the word wether ("castrated male sheep"), though was adapted over time through folk-etymology both to the personal name Walter and to the noun water.

== Geography ==
The settlement is popular with tourists, with several campsites and two hotels. The village and outlying farms are widely scattered between the lake and Little Mell Fell. Much of the high ground around the village was once deer forest, popular with the local gentry for hunting. All Saints Church, Watermillock was built in 1881 of slate and red sandstone, replacing an earlier church at the site of what is now known as the Old Church Hotel. All the windows are memorials to various people, including Cecil Spring Rice and Stephen Spring Rice, who grew up in the village.

The village is accessed by the A592 road. The Outward Bound Trust own the village manor next to the lake. The waterfall of Aira Force is situated to the west of the village.

== See also ==
- Listed buildings in Matterdale
