= Listed buildings in Matterdale =

Matterdale is a civil parish in Westmorland and Furness, Cumbria, England. It contains 33 listed buildings that are recorded in the National Heritage List for England. Of these, three are listed at Grade II*, the middle of the three grades, and the others are at Grade II, the lowest grade. The parish is in the Lake District National Park. It contains the settlements of Watermillock, Matterdale End, Wreay, Dockray, and Hutton, and apart from that it is mainly rural comprising countryside, moorland and fells.

Most of the listed buildings are houses and associated structures, farmhouses and farm buildings. The other listed buildings are churches, memorials in a churchyard, a sundial, a bridge, a hotel, an outward bound school, a milepost, and a mill.

== Key ==
Grade	Criteria
II*	Particularly important buildings of more than special interest
II	Buildings of national importance and special interest

== Buildings ==
Name and location	Photograph	Date	Notes	Grade
Matterdale Church; 54.59351°N 2.93878°W		1573	The tower was added in 1848. The church is in stone with a slate roof. It consists of a nave and chancel in one unit, with a south porch and a west tower. The tower has diagonal buttresses, triangular-headed bell openings, and a saddleback roof with crow-stepped gables. The windows have cross-mullions.	II*
Fox House; 54.60354°N 2.93524°W	—	Third quarter of 17th century (possible)	A stone farmhouse with a stone-flagged roof, originally part of a longhouse, it has two storeys and three bays. The north front is blank apart from a plain door. In the south front are a doorway, mullioned windows and a fire window.	II
Aira Farmhouse and barns 54.57837°N 2.97565°W	—	Late 17th century (probable)	This consists of a farmhouse, a former farmhouse to the right, and a barn at both ends, all in stone with slate roofs. Both houses have three bays and rear outshuts. The farmhouse has sash windows, those in the ground floor with lintels, and the former farmhouse windows have no frames. The barn to the right has ventilation slits, and the barn to the left has an entrance and a pitching hole, and a projecting range at the end.	II
Cove Farmhouse, barn and smithy 54.60439°N 2.88285°W	—	Late 17th century	The farmhouse and outbuildings are in stone with slate roofs. The farmhouse in the centre has a roughcast front, two storeys, three bays, and a gabled wing at the rear. Most of the windows are sashes, and one window is mullioned and contains casements. The barn to the right has a doorway with a dated and keyed lintel, windows, and a winnowing door, and at the end is a gabled wing with ventilation slits. Inside the barn is an upper cruck truss. To the left of the house and at right angles, is a former smithy.	II
Knotts Farmhouse and outbuilding 54.58625°N 2.87163°W	—	Late 17th century (probable)	The farmhouse and the outbuilding are in stone, and the front of the farmhouse is rendered. The house has two storeys and six bays, the first bay, a 19th-century addition, is a projecting gabled wing. The windows in the wing are sashes; elsewhere most windows are mullioned in chamfered surrounds, and some are sashes. The outbuilding to the right has two bays, and contains an elliptical-headed cart entrance with a pitching hole above, and external steps leading to an upper floor door. At the rear is a continuous outshut.	II
Watermillock House and part of Magnolia Cottage; 54.59428°N 2.85893°W	—	1689	The house was extended in the late 18th century. It is roughcast with a slate roof, and has two storeys with attics, and a front of three bays, the outer bays projecting forward and gabled. The central doorway has moulded jambs, and a decorated lintel with initials and the date. The windows in the central bay are mullioned, with a continuous hood mould above the ground floor windows, and a fire window. There are doors on the inner sides of the outer bays, and these contain sash windows and each gable has two oval oculi. At the rear is a five-bay extension with a hipped roof, sash windows and a Venetian stair window.	II*
Hudson Monument; 54.59853°N 2.88106°W	—	1720	The monument is in the churchyard of All Saints Church, and is a table tomb. It consists of a slab with a moulded edge and coving. The slab is carried on plain blocks.	II
Bennethead Farmhouse and barns 54.60660°N 2.86695°W	—	Early 18th century (probable)	The farmhouse is flanked by barns, they are all in stone, the farmhouse is roughcast, and they have slate roofs. The house has two storeys, three bays, a gabled rear wing, sash windows, one with a mullion, and a doorway with a chamfered surround. The barn to the right has two blocked doorways and two inserted windows, and the barn to the left, which is lower, has segmental-headed entrance on the front, and an owl hole on the side.	II
Crows Nest and outbuilding 54.60221°N 2.93888°W	—	Early 18th century (probable)	The house and outbuilding are roughcast with a slate roof. The house has two storeys and three bays, and windows of varying types; these include sashes, horizontally-sliding sashes, a fire window and a casement window. To the right is a single-bay outbuilding that has a doorway with a timber lintel.	II
Wallthwaite; 54.62721°N 3.00231°W	—	Early 18th century	A stone farmhouse with a slate roof, it has two storeys, four bays, and two gabled wings at the rear flanking an outshut. On the front is a gabled porch, and the windows are a mix of sashes and casements.	II
Hollins Farmhouse and barn 54.58675°N 2.93951°W	—	1736 or earlier	The farmhouse and barn are roughcast with slate roofs. The house has two storeys and two bays, a gabled wing at the rear, and it contains casement windows. The barn to the east has various openings, including a pitching hole, a gabled wing at the rear, and an outshut.	II
Dowthwaite Monument; 54.59866°N 2.88104°W	—	1740	The monument is in the churchyard of All Saints Church, and is a table tomb. It consists of a slab with moulded edges on plain supports, on which is an inscription.	II
Hudson Monument; 54.59863°N 2.88102°W	—	1746	The monument is in the churchyard of All Saints Church, and is a table tomb. It consists of a slab with a moulded edge on square balusters. The tomb is inscribed with the names of members of the Hudson family and a quotation.	II
Tongue House, barn and cottage 54.61021°N 2.87807°W	—	1746	A group of buildings in roughcast stone with slate roofs. The house has two storeys, an L-shaped plan, and a south range of six bays. Some of the windows are mullioned, some are sashes, and some are casements. The doorway has a dated lintel, and at the rear is an outshut. To the north is a barn with a segmental-headed entrance and doors with a fanlight. Beyond the barn is a two-bay cottage with sash windows.	II
Rookin House and barn 54.61965°N 2.95909°W	—	Mid 18th century	The farmhouse and barn are in stone with slate roofs. The farmhouse has two storeys and five bays. The doorway has a Gibbs surround, a pulvinated frieze, and a pediment, and the windows are sashes. To the left a single-storey bay connects the house with a barn that has two entrances, one with a timber lintel.	II
Sparket Mill; 54.62952°N 2.87317°W		18th century (probable)	A watermill, originally a cornmill, later a sawmill, with a house dating from the 19th century. It is in stone with quoins and slate roofs. The building has a T-shaped plan, consisting of the house to the south, the sawmill to the north, and a grain drying kiln to the west. The house has two storeys and five bays; most of the windows are sashes. The sawmill has two storeys, an open front, and a central pier. Much of the machinery in the mill has been retained.	II
Gate and gatepiers, Watermillock House; 54.59435°N 2.85874°W	—	18th century (probable)	The gate piers are rusticated, and have cornices, tall ball finials. The gate is wooden, with round-headed arches and an ogival head.	II
Barn and byre, Fox House; 54.60362°N 2.93515°W	—	1759	The barn and byre are in stone with stone-flagged roofs. The barn adjoins the house at right angles to the south, and the byre continues to the east, forming with the house a T-shaped plan. The barn has two storeys, four bays, and a segmental-arched cart entrance with voussoirs. The byre is in a single storey and has five irregular bays.	II
Dawson Monument; 54.59865°N 2.88126°W	—	1766	The monument is in the churchyard of All Saints Church, and is a table tomb. It consists of a slab with a simply moulded edge. The slab is carried on low supports with moulded caps.	II
Rumney Monument; 54.59866°N 2.88116°W	—	1767	The monument is in the churchyard of All Saints Church, and is a chest tomb. There are fluted panels on all sides, and the top slab has a moulded edge.	II
Waterside House; 54.59350°N 2.85747°W	—	1771 or earlier	A country house with a stable range, it is in stone with a modillioned cornice and a slate roof, and has two storeys and a U-shaped plan. The northeast range forms the house, and has four irregular bays. Some windows are mullioned and others are sashes, and at the end is a gabled wing with a polygonal bay window. The northwest wing contains an elliptical-headed through arch and an oriel window. The northwest wing, formerly an outbuilding, and partly incorporated into the house, contains an elliptical-headed entrance and smaller entrances.	II
Lyulph's Tower; 54.57345°N 2.92329°W		1780	A house, originally built as a hunting lodge by Charles Howard, the future 11th Duke of Norfolk. In front of it is an embattled screen wall forming three sides of an octagon, with a polygonal tower at the ends and at each corner. The two-storey house runs behind the screen wall and has a lean-to roof, and living rooms in the upper floor with large round-headed windows. In the centre is a later additional range with a hipped roof.	II*
Sundial; 54.59852°N 2.88117°W	—	1786	The sundial is in the churchyard of All Saints Church, and consists of a medieval gravestone set upright. On the south face is a cross in relief, and on the top is an octagonal plate, but no gnomon.	II
Bald How; 54.60468°N 2.91917°W	—	Late 18th to early 19th century	A stuccoed farmhouse with quoins, a slate roof, two storeys and four bays. On the front is a Tuscan porch with a cornice. The windows are sashes in plain surrounds.	II
The Croft; 54.60608°N 2.86725°W	—	Late 18th to early 19th century	A house with flanking outbuildings forming a U-shaped plan, they are roughcast with slate roofs. The house has quoins, two storeys and three bays. There is a central round-headed doorway with an open pediment. On the front is a canted bay window, and the other windows are casements. To the left is an outbuilding that has been incorporated into the house; this has sash windows, and a round-headed stair window with pilasters and a keystone. Beyond that is a barn, and there is another barn to the right of the house.	II
Calley Bridge; 54.63062°N 2.87114°W	—	1820	The bridge carries a road over Dacre Beck. It is in stone and consists of a single segmental arch. The bridge has a hood band, a straight parapet with chamfered coping, and flanking raking abutments.	II
Milepost; 54.63174°N 3.00085°W	—	Early 19th century (probable)	The milepost consists of an upright slate slab with an ogival top. On it is a cast iron panel inscribed with the distances in miles to Keswick and to Penrith.	II
Outward Bound School; 54.58242°N 2.87114°W	—	Early 19th century	Originally a house, later used as an outward bound school, it is stuccoed with a cornice that is partly dentilled, and has hipped slate roofs. The main front has two and three storeys and ten bays, the first and second bays projecting, and the fifth to seventh bays recessed. On the front is a Tuscan porch that has Doric columns, an Ionic entablature, and an iron balcony. The right side of the house has five bays, the three central bays forming a canted projection. Most of the windows are sashes, the others being casements.	II
Pollard Monument; 54.59880°N 2.88128°W	—	1834	The monument is in the churchyard of All Saints Church, and is an ashlar chest tomb. It has square balusters on the corners, and incised side panels.. The top slab has a moulded edge and an inscription.	II
Leeming House Hotel; 54.58668°N 2.86524°W	—	Early to mid 19th century	Originally a country house, later a hotel, it was extended in 1973. The hotel is in stone with bays, a band, hipped slate roofs, and two storeys. The windows are sashes in architraves, those in the ground floor having a frieze and a cornice. On the front is a porte-cochère with Tuscan columns on plinths with an entablature and a balustrade. There is a service wing that has a timber bell turret with a pyramidal roof and a weathervane. The extension has a verandah carried on pairs of cast iron columns with an ornamental cast iron balustrade.	II
Marshall Monument; 54.59882°N 2.88127°W	—	1845	The monument is in the churchyard of All Saints Church, and is an ashlar chest tomb. The tomb has a double-chamfered base with plain panels on the sides, and on the top slab are inscriptions.	II
Boathouse and cottage 54.58177°N 2.87682°W	—	Mid to late 19th century (probable)	The boathouse and cottage are in slate rubble, with some sandstone, they are partly rendered, and have quoins and a slate roof. The building has a T-shaped plan. The house has one storey with an attic, a porch with a segmental head, and casement windows. The front facing the lake has a boathouse entrance with a segmental head, and above is a four-bay loggia with Doric columns and demi-columns and a frieze.	II
All Saints Church; 54.59875°N 2.88125°W		1884	The church, designed by C. J. Ferguson, is in slate with sandstone dressings, quoins, and a slate roof with coped gables. It consists of a nave, a chancel with a south vestry, and a west tower. The tower has a north gabled porch, a west window, a south stair turret, a west entrance with a decorated lintel, a projecting coped parapet, and a pyramidal roof. The windows in the church are lancets.	II
