= Aira Force =

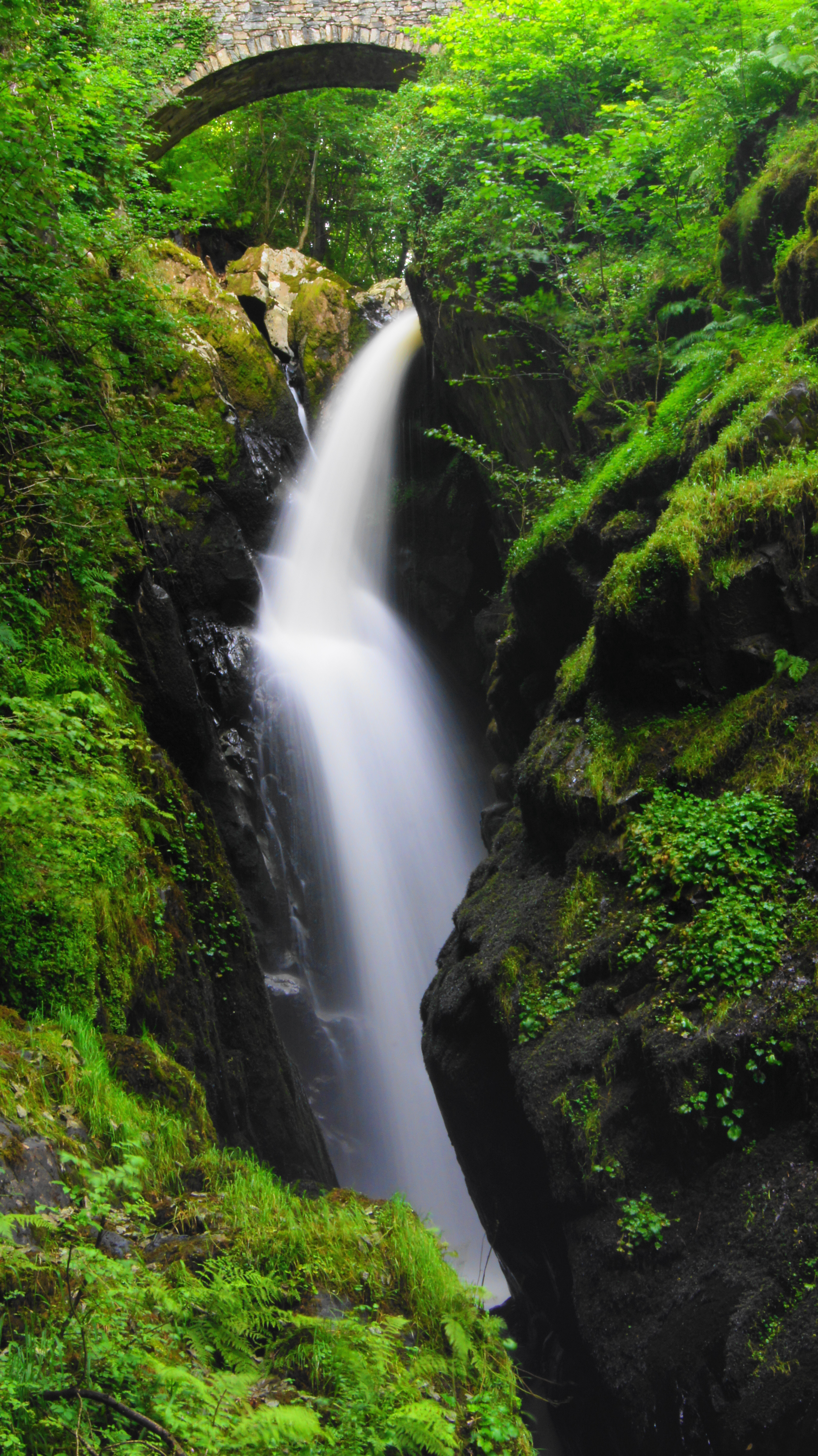
- The waterfall in 2012
- Interactive map of the Aira Force area
- Location: Matterdale, Cumbria
- OS grid: NY401203
- Coordinates: 54.5763°N 2.9309°W
- Total height: 70 feet (21 m)

Aira Force is a waterfall in the English Lake District, in the civil parish of Matterdale and the county of Cumbria. The site of the waterfall is owned by the National Trust.

== Description ==
The stream flowing over the waterfall is Aira Beck, which rises on the upper slopes of Stybarrow Dodd at a height of 720 metres (2,362 ft) and flows north-easterly before turning south, blocked by the high heather-covered slopes of Gowbarrow Fell. It turns south on its eight-kilometre journey to join Ullswater, at a height of 150 metres (492 ft). One kilometre before entering the lake, the beck makes the 20 metres (66 ft) leap down a rocky and steep sided ravine at the falls known as Aira Force. The water falls approximately 22 metres (72 ft) to a rocky pool, from where the beck continues through a shallow valley to the lake.

The river name Aira is derived from Old Norse eyrr, a gravel bank, and Old Norse á, a river, hence "the river at the gravel bank", a reference to Aira Point, a gravelly spit where the river enters Ullswater. The Old Norse word fors, waterfall, has been adopted into several northern English dialects and is widely used for waterfalls, with the English spelling 'Force'. Thus, "the waterfall on gravel-bank river".

== Tourism ==
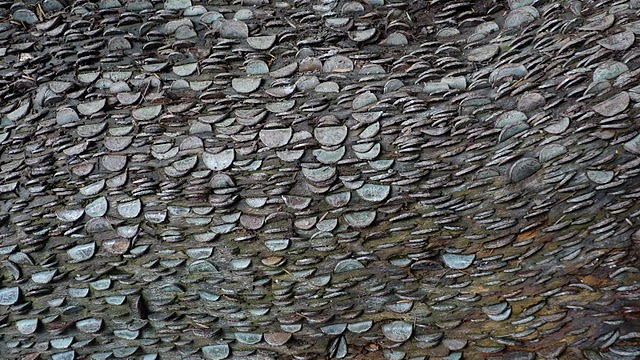
Wish tree coins in timber at Aira Force

Aira Force lies on land owned by the National Trust. The Trust purchased the 750-acre Gowbarrow Park (on which the force lies) in 1906 and has provided facilities, such as car parking, disabled access, graded paths, and viewing platforms to make Aira Force one of the most famous and most visited waterfalls in the Lake District. The National Trust has also provided public lavatories, a café, and a visitor centre. The site is open to visitors throughout the year. A public footpath from the village of Dockray passes the waterfall.

Beside the walk that passes up the glen is located a good example of a Wish Tree, in this case using a large fallen tree trunk. Visitors hammer coins into it using stones from the site.

In 2015, Ullswater 'Steamers' opened a jetty on the lake shore near Aira Force, making the waterfall accessible by foot passenger ferry from Glenridding. A footpath runs from Aira Force as far as Glencoyne Bay, but only a track exists from this point on.

== Bridges ==
A small arched bridge spans the stream just as the beck goes over the falls giving views from the top. There is also a second bridge at the foot of the falls. Both bridges were constructed in honour of members of the Spring family early in the 20th century. Cecil Spring Rice was the British ambassador to the USA during the First World War, while Stephen Spring Rice was a senior civil servant. Lt Gerald Spring Rice of the 11th Battalion, Border Regiment was killed in 1916 during the First World War and buried in France.

The bridges are of particular interest: the lower is made of vertical stones, not traditional in this area of Cumbria, while the higher has horizontal stones, more in keeping with the dale customs.

In 2021, the lower bridge was rendered inaccessible after a tree fall during heavy storms. Access was restored by installing steel platforms.

== Poetry ==
The Lake Poet William Wordsworth paid many visits to the area around Aira Force; he was probably inspired to write his poem "Daffodils", with the opening line "I wandered lonely as a cloud", as he and Dorothy Wordsworth observed daffodils growing on the shore of Ullswater near where Aira Beck enters the lake near Glencoyne Bay. The falls themselves are mentioned in three Wordsworth poems, the most famous reference being in "The Somnambulist", where in the final verse he writes:

Wild stream of Aira, hold thy course,
Nor fear memorial lays,
Where clouds that spread in solemn shade,
Are edged with golden rays!
Dear art thou to the light of heaven,
Though minister of sorrow;
Sweet is thy voice at pensive even.
And thou, in lovers' hearts forgiven,
Shalt take thy place with Yarrow!

Letitia Elizabeth Landon's poetical illustration in Fisher's Drawing Room Scrap Book, 1834, Airey Force, to an engraving of a painting by Thomas Allom, refers to a legend that a hermit once lived beneath the falls.

== Transport ==
Bus routes serving the waterfall are run by Stagecoach.

== See also ==
- List of waterfalls
- List of waterfalls in the United Kingdom
