= Ullswater =

Lake in Cumbria, England

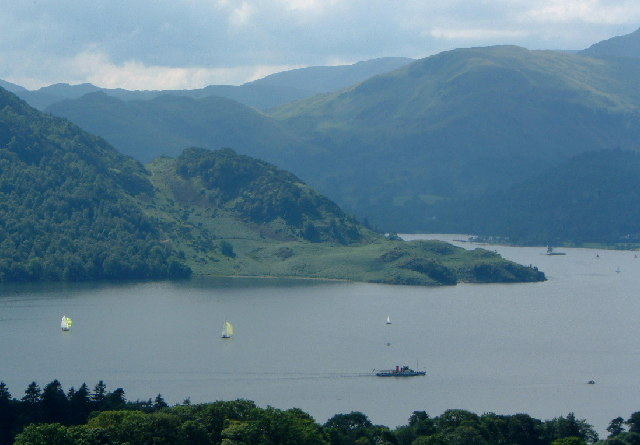
- Ullswater looking towards Silver Point.

- Location in the Lake District National Park Location in Eden, Cumbria
- Location: Lake District, England
- Coordinates: 54.5775°N 2.8750°W
- Type: Ribbon lake
- Basin countries: United Kingdom
- Max. length: 11.8 km (7.3 mi)
- Max. width: 1.02 km (0.63 mi)
- Surface area: 8.9 km^{2} (3.4 sq mi)
- Average depth: 25.3 m (83 ft)
- Max. depth: 63 m (207 ft)
- Water volume: 223×10^{6} m^{3} (181,000 acre⋅ft)
- Residence time: 350 days
- Surface elevation: 145 m (476 ft)
- Settlements: Glenridding, Pooley Bridge

Ullswater is a glacial lake in Cumbria, England. It is part of the Lake District and is the second largest lake in the region by both area and volume, after Windermere. The lake is about 7 miles (11 km) long, 0.75 miles (1 km) wide, and has a maximum depth of 63 metres (207 ft). Its outflow is the River Eamont, which meets the River Eden at Brougham Castle before flowing into the Solway Firth. The lake historically formed part of the border between Cumberland and Westmorland.

== Geography ==
It is a typical Lake District "ribbon lake", formed after the last ice age by a glacier scooping out the valley floor, which then filled with meltwater. Ullswater was formed by three glaciers. Surrounding hills give it the shape of an extenuated "Z" with three segments or reaches winding through them. For much of its length, Ullswater formed the border between the historic counties of Cumberland and Westmorland.

== Toponymy ==
The origin of the name Ullswater is uncertain. Whaley suggests "Ulf's lake", from Old Norse personal name Ulfr plus Middle English water, influenced in usage by the Old Norse vatn (water or lake). Ulfr is also the Old Norse noun meaning wolf, and Hutchinson thought that the name might refer to the lake as a resort of wolves, or to its elbow-shaped bend (citing a Celtic ulle)."

Some say it comes from the name of a Nordic chief named Ulf, who ruled over the area. There was also a Saxon Lord of Greystoke called Ulphus, whose land bordered the lake. The lake may have been named Ulf's Water in honour of either of these, or after the Norse god Ullr. Hodgson Hill, an earthwork on the north-east shoreline of Ullswater may be the remains of a Viking fortified settlement.

== Settlements ==
Glenridding, is situated at the southern end of the lake, Pooley Bridge is at the northern end, other villages situated on Ullswater include Howtown, Sandwick and Watermillock.

Ullswater is overlooked by Dunmallard Hill, which was the site of an Iron Age fort, on the western side of the lake is the Aira Force waterfall.

== Activities ==
The lake has been a tourist destination since the mid-18th century. By the 1890s, Ullswater had become a fashionable holiday destination for the British aristocracy, thanks to its good sailing conditions and proximity to fell shooting estates. In 1912, Wilhelm II, German Emperor visited Ullswater and toured the lake on the MY Raven, which was re-fitted to act as a royal yacht. A shooting lodge (The Bungalow) was constructed for the Kaiser at Martindale by the major local landowner, Hugh Lowther, 5th Earl of Lonsdale.

Ullswater's attractions include the Ullswater "Steamers" which offer trips around the lake calling at Pooley Bridge, Glenridding, Howtown and Aira Force. These sail all the year round and were originally working boats which from the 1850s moved mail, workers and goods to and from the Greenside Mine at Glenridding, which closed in 1962.

A 20 miles (32 km) walking route the Ullswater Way was officially opened in 2016 by writer and broadcaster Eric Robson. The route can be walked in either direction and from any starting point.

Ullswater is also a sailing location with several marinas round the lake. It is home to the Ullswater Yacht Club and the Lord Birkett Memorial Trophy, held annually on the first weekend in July. This regularly attracts over 200 sailing boats for two races covering the length of the lake. There are also facilities for diving, rowing and motorboats. Another of attraction is the waterfall of Aira Force, midway along the lake on the western side. Ullswater lies partly within the National Trust's Ullswater and Aira Force property. Close to the falls is Lyulph's Tower, a pele tower or castellated building built by a former Duke of Norfolk as a shooting box. The Sharrow Bay Country House hotel stands on the lake's eastern shore.

Donald Campbell set the world water speed record on Ullswater on 23 July 1955, when he piloted the jet-propelled hydroplane "Bluebird K7" to a speed of 202.32 mph (325.53 km/h).

Ullswater Lake is a popular tourist destination containing many campsites, static caravan parks, and holiday parks. The rural setting gives plenty of space for pitching tents as well as woodland shelter and screening.

Many sailing events take place at Ullswater Yacht Club located on the lake.

=== The Lord Birkett Memorial Trophy ===
Ullswater
- Most recent edition or competition: 62nd Lord Birkett Memorial Trophy
- Sponsors: Magic Marine, Triggernaut Sports Glasses
- First held: 27–28 July 1963
- Venue: Ullswater Yacht Club
- Champions: (United Kingdom) Adam Ovington & Stuart Keegan - International 14
- Most titles: (United Kingdom) Lee Noble (2002, 2004-2007, 2009) -6, (United Kingdom) Lester Noble (2004-2007, 2009, 2010) - 6
- Website: https://www.ullswaterycbirkett.org/

The Lord Birkett Memorial Trophy is an annual sailing regatta held at the Ullswater Yacht Club. It was first held in 1963 following the death of Lord Norman Birkett, whom the event and trophy is named for.

Following the death of Lord Birkett shortly after he gave a speech in campaigning for the prevention of Ullswater being turned into a reservoir, the event was held for the following year in the first weekend of July. Since then the event has been held during the same weekend every year since, excluding 2020 when it was cancelled due to the COVID pandemic. The event was first won by Robin Steavenson and Ewen Stamp of Tynemouth Sailing Club, who sailed an International 14.

The regatta contains two races across the two days, with both being a full lap of the 9 mile (14.5km) long Ullswater. The regatta does not allow a discard race, meaning that both races sailed count towards final results.

== Ullswater geese deaths ==
In 2022, greylag geese on the lake were seen to be dragged underwater by several witnesses on different occasions. The cause is unknown, though there was speculation that a large pike, a wels catfish or an otter was responsible. Dr Roger Sweeting, of the Freshwater Biological Association, also suggested that the birds could have become entangled in discarded fishing line and had become exhausted, losing their stability.

== Notable people ==
Just south of Pooley Bridge on the lake's eastern shore is Eusemere, where anti-slavery campaigner Thomas Clarkson (1760–1846) lived; the house gives one of the best views of the lower reach of Ullswater. William and Dorothy Wordsworth were friends of Clarkson and visited on many occasions. After visiting Clarkson in April 1802, Wordsworth was inspired to write his famous poem Daffodils after seeing daffodils growing on the shores of Ullswater on his journey back to Grasmere. Wordsworth once wrote of "Ullswater, as being, perhaps, upon the whole, the happiest combination of beauty and grandeur, which any of the Lakes affords".

The politician William Marshall lived on the Ullswater shore at Watermillock. His descendants, the diplomat Sir Cecil Spring Rice and his brother Stephen Spring Rice, were brought up there. Nearby Aira Force has several memorials to members of the Spring family.

In 1962, Lord Birkett led a campaign to prevent Ullswater from becoming a reservoir. He died one day after the proposition was defeated in the House of Lords and he is commemorated with a plaque on Kailpot Crag. The Birkett Regatta, held each year in early July, involves a two-day round-the-island race in Birkett's memory, 2018 was the 60th anniversary of the event, with Lord Birkett's granddaughter in attendance.

== Gallery ==
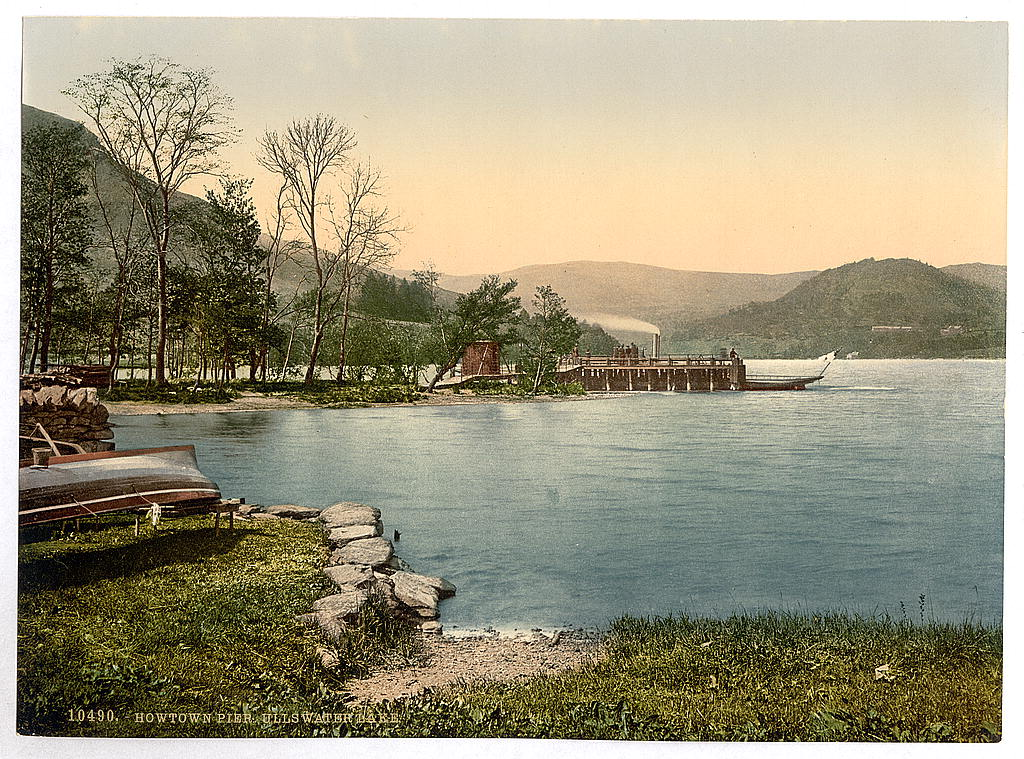
Lake steamer at Howtown Pier, Ullswater, circa 1895

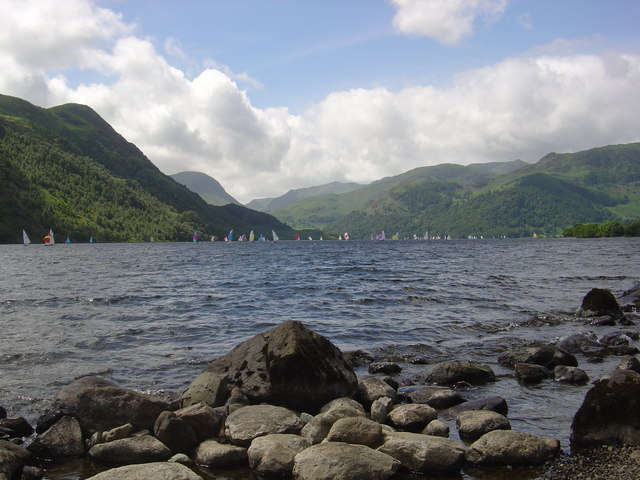
Sailing is a common activity on Ullswater

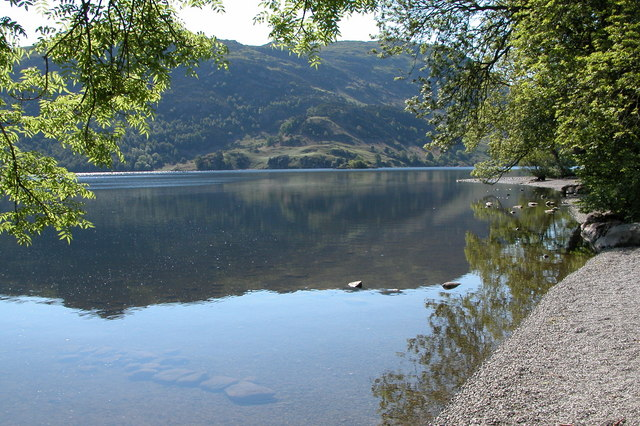
Place Fell viewed across Ullswater

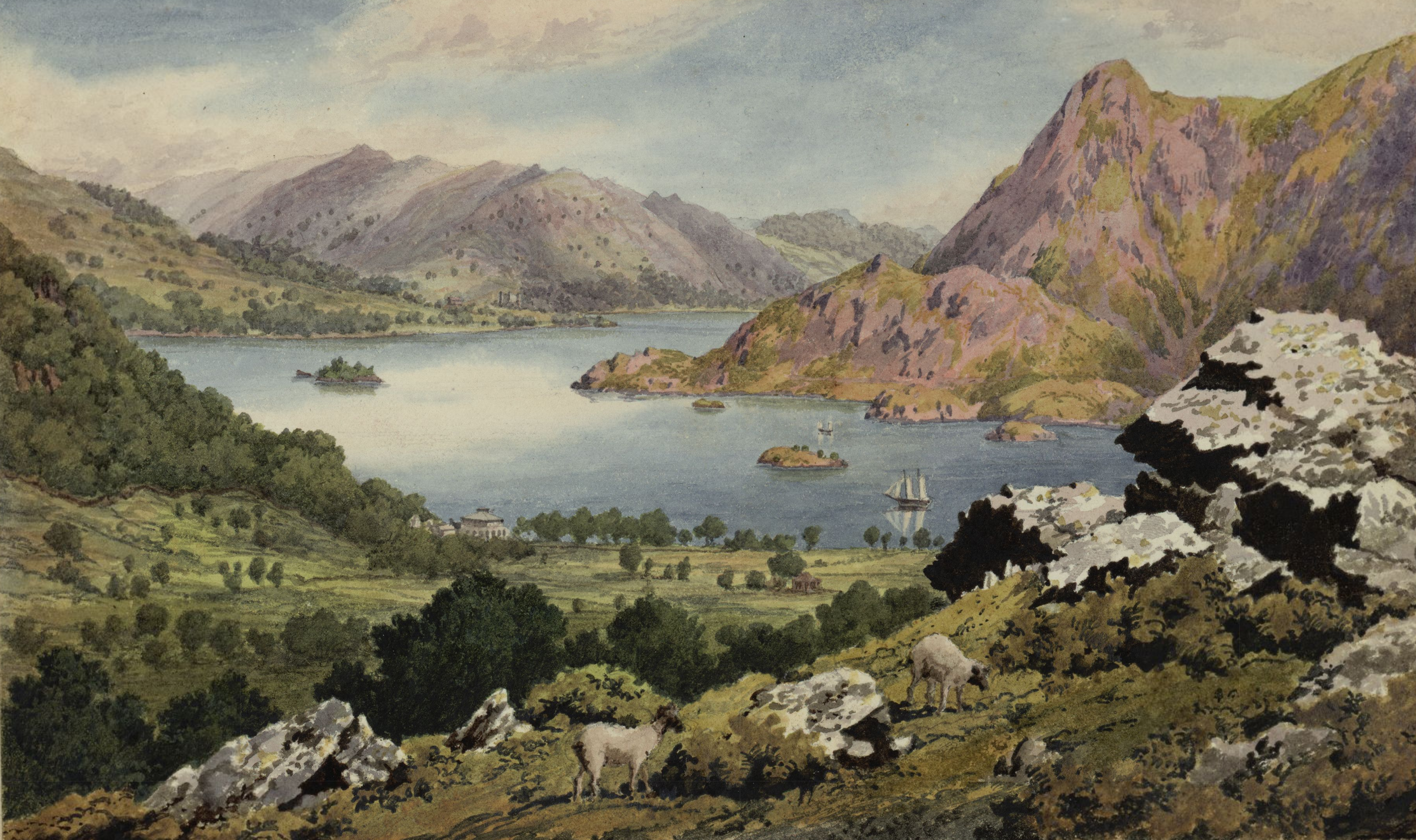
Ullswater painted in 1825

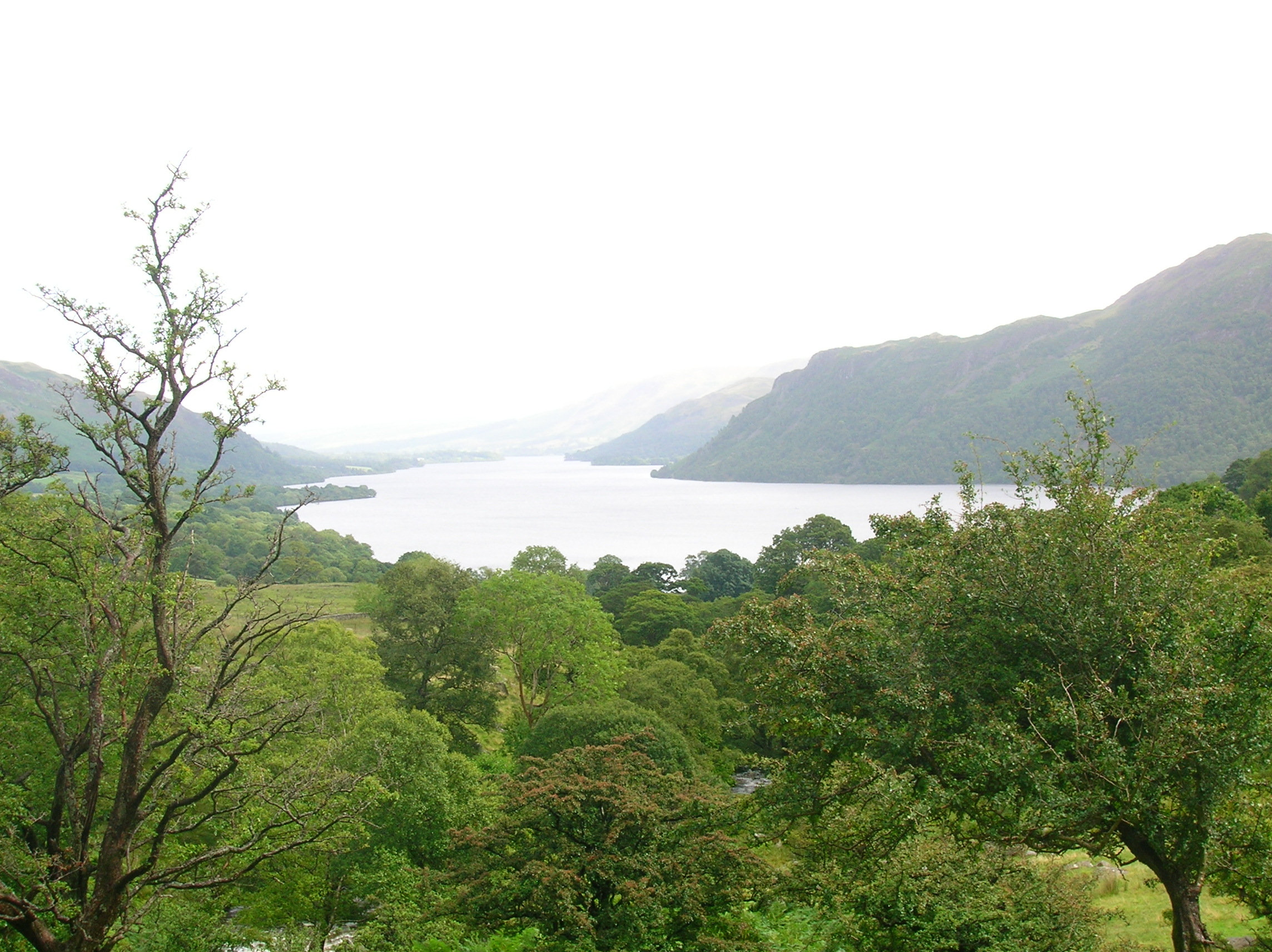
Ullswater from Seldom Seen in Glencoynedale

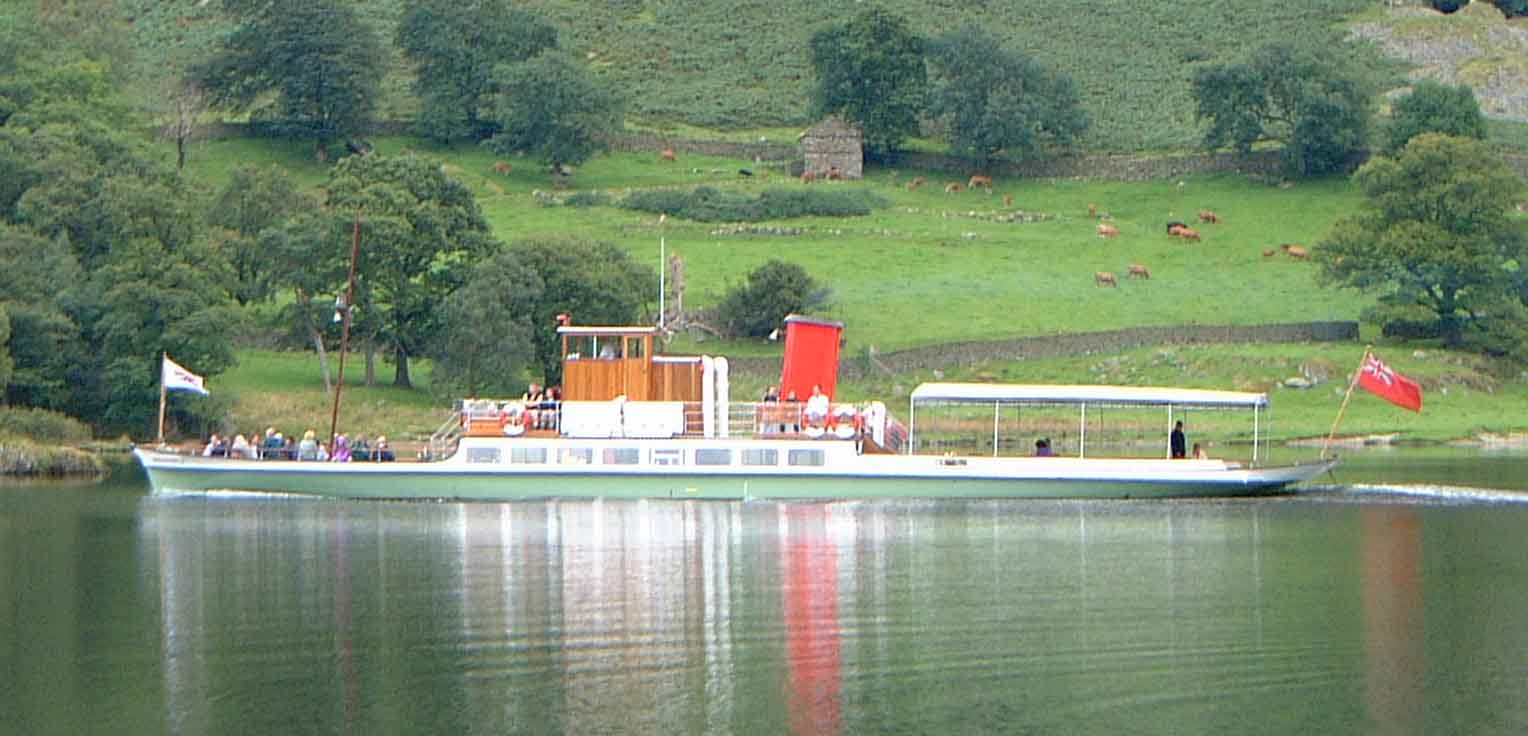
Ullswater steamer SS Lady of the Lake leaves Glenridding

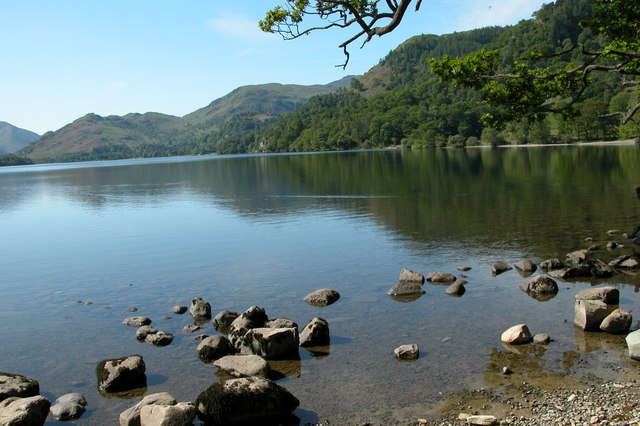
View south towards Patterdale

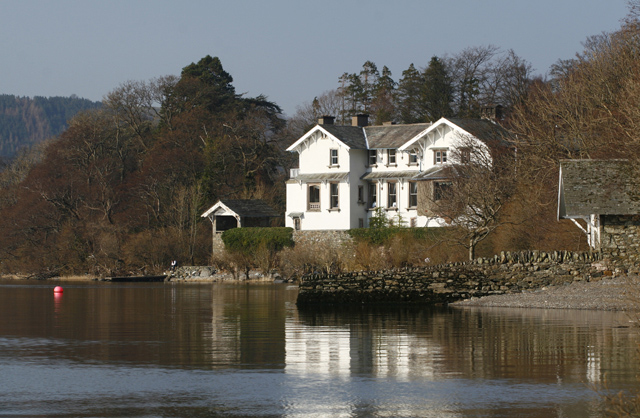
Sharrow Bay Country House

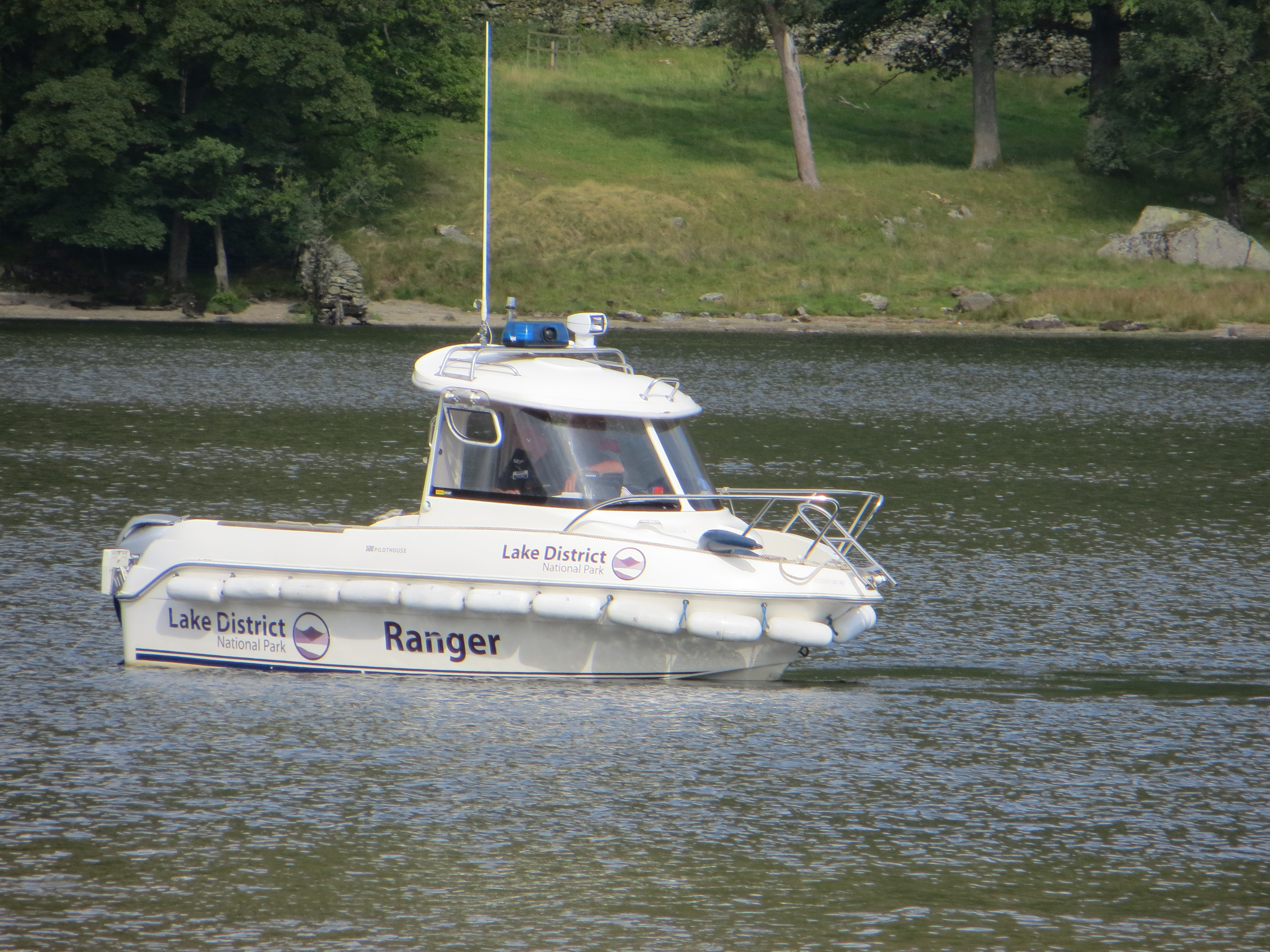
Quicksilver 500 Pilothouse used by the Lake District National Park Authority

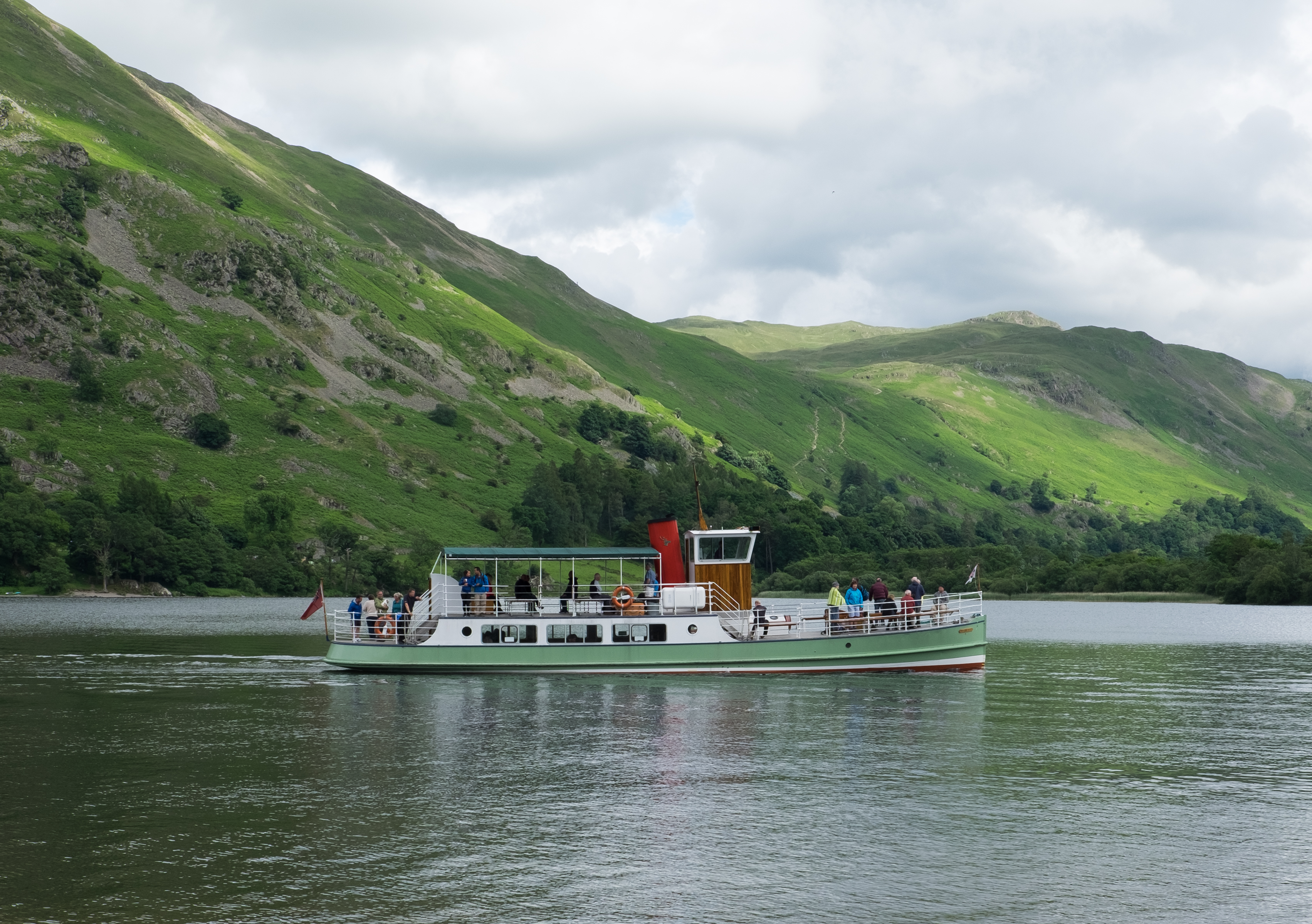
The Western Belle on Ullswater

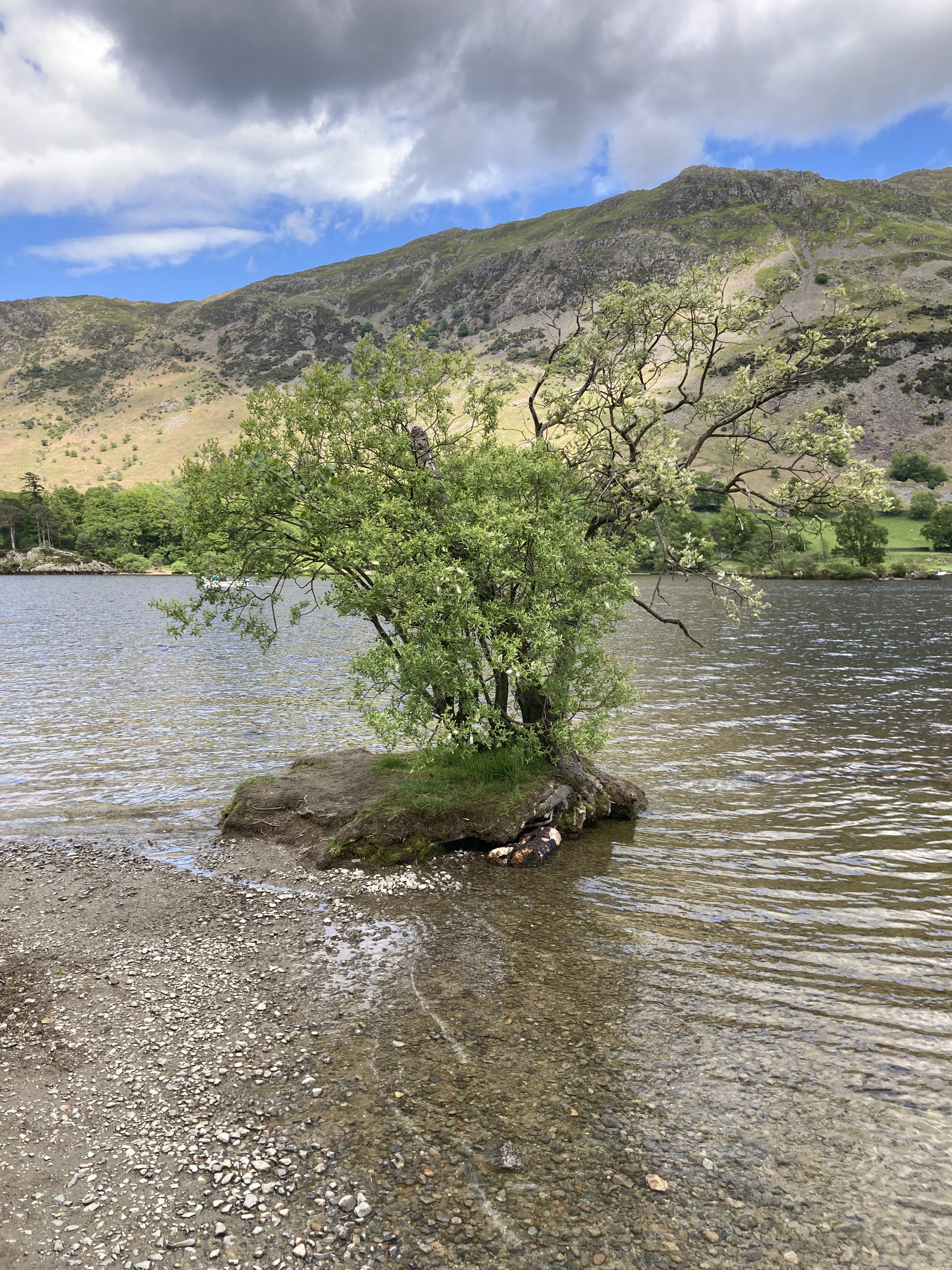
An alder tree at Ullswater

== See also ==
- Lake District National Park
