= Greenside Mine =

Former lead mine in the Lake District of England

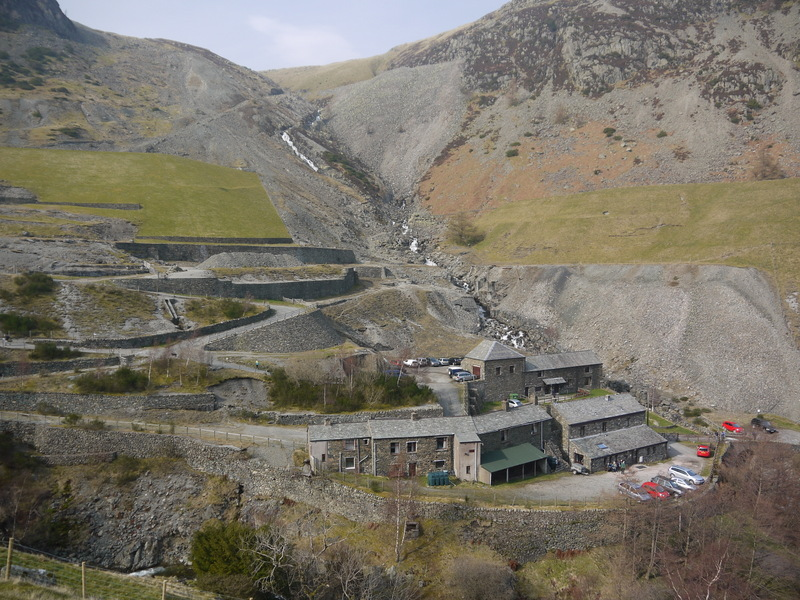
- Site of the former Greenside Mine

- Location in Cumbria
- Location: Glenridding, Cumbria, England; 54°32′53″N 2°59′02″W
- Products: lead, silver
- Production: 156,000 tons
- Type: Underground
- Opened: during the 1700s
- Closed: 1962

Greenside Mine (sometimes referred to as Greenside Lead Mine) was a successful lead mine in the Lake District of England. Between 1825 and 1961 the mine produced 156,000 long tons (159,000 tonnes) of lead and 1,600,000 ounces (45 tonnes) of silver, from around 2 million tons of ore. (Note: Estimates of the amount of crude ore brought out of the mine vary from below 2 million tons, based on figures given by Cyril Connor to 2.4 million tons, to about 3 million tons.) During the 1940s it was the largest producer of lead ore in the UK. Unusually for a 19th-century metalliferous mine in Britain there are very full records of its activities, dating back to 1825.

The mine probably opened during the second half of the 1700s but had closed by 1819. In 1825 the Greenside Mining Company was formed and reopened the mine. They made good profits until 1880, after which price of lead fell. Many other lead mines closed at that time, but the company reduced its costs and continued to work Greenside until 1935. Electricity was introduced to the mine in the 1890s, and it became the first metalliferous mine in Britain to use electric winding engines and an electric locomotive. In 1936 the Basinghall Mining Syndicate Ltd. acquired the mine and turned it into a high volume lead producer. The mine closed in 1962 after lead reserves had been exhausted. Just before it closed the mine was used by the Atomic Weapons Research Establishment (AWRE) to conduct an experiment in detecting seismic signals from underground explosions. Fifteen years after the mine closed mine explorers began to visit the upper levels. They cleared the entrances and several roof falls, and today they are able to pass through the mine using an old escape route.

All the ore produced by the mine came from the Greenside Vein, a mineral vein which filled a geological fault running in a north–south direction through the east ridge of Green Side, a mountain in the Helvellyn range. Mining activities traced this fault for a length of 3,900 feet (1,200 m) and to a depth of 2,900 feet (880 m). Four areas of the vein, known as ore shoots, contained galena, an ore of lead which also contained small amounts of silver. At first the ore was mined simply by driving adits into the mountain-side. To access ore at greater depths, two longer levels were driven from lower down but further away, and then a series of shafts were sunk within the mine. The lowest point in the mine was roughly 100 m below sea level, where the surrounding andesite rock rested upon underlying shales in which the fault had not been mineralised.

Two processing mills were built to crush the ore and separate out the galena from it, and the mine had its own smelt mill between 1828 and 1917, but after that it was more economical to sell concentrated galena to a commercial smelter. Machinery in the mine and the mills was powered by the plentiful water supplies in the area, used to drive water wheels and power hydraulic engines, and, after 1890, to generate hydroelectricity. Dozens of carts transported supplies to the mine's remote location, and carried the lead out. In the early 1900s the mine set up its own road haulage business using two steam wagons.

The men who worked at the mine during the 19th century travelled from a wide area, and many stayed each week in the lodging shops (bunkhouses) built at the mine. In time the company built dozens of houses in Glenridding and at Seldom Seen in Glencoynedale where a school was also built. Mining work was carried out by groups of men who took contracts to do specific jobs, and were paid by their results. Those who worked transporting ore out of the mine or processing the ore were paid at weekly rates. The closure of the mine resulted in a major loss of employment in the area.

== The location ==
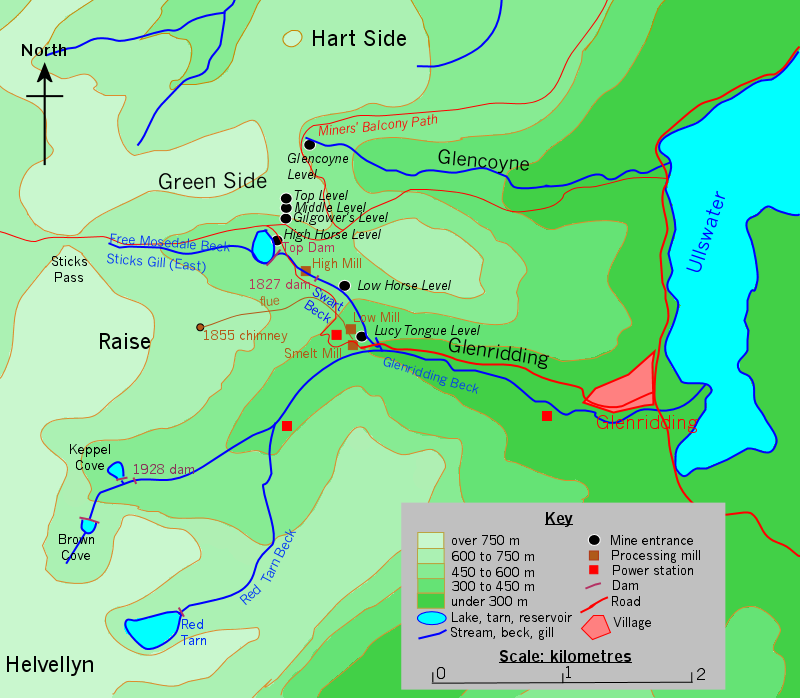
The location of Greenside Mine near Glenridding

The mine was west of Glenridding village, which is by the southern end of Ullswater in the parish of Patterdale. This is now in Cumbria, but during the working life of the mine it was in the former county of Westmorland. Above the village is a valley which contains Glenridding Beck, flowing down from sources in Red Tarn and Brown Cove. A higher side valley to the north lies between the mountains of Green Side and Raise. It was above this side valley that the lead deposit was found, running through the eastern ridge of Green Side, at a height of about 2,000 feet (600 m) above sea level.

In the 18th century this deposit was worked from levels driven directly into the mountain-side, above the upper valley. Later, levels were driven to the deposit from lower down but from further away. By the end of the 19th century, the main access to the mine was from the Lucy Tongue Level, which had been driven from near the bottom of the Swart Beck. The mills for processing and smelting the ore were in the same location, 1.4 miles (2.3 km) up the valley above Glenridding village.

Water power for working machinery in the mine and the mills was drawn from the stream below Green Side, and from Glenridding Beck. A number of dams were built to regulate the flow of water in these becks, and natural tarns at Red Tarn and in Keppel Cove were augmented. After 1890, water power from the becks was used to generate electricity and eventually three small power stations were built. A small stream was also diverted into the mine through the Glencoyne Level in the 1850s to drive hydraulic machinery.

== The ore deposit ==
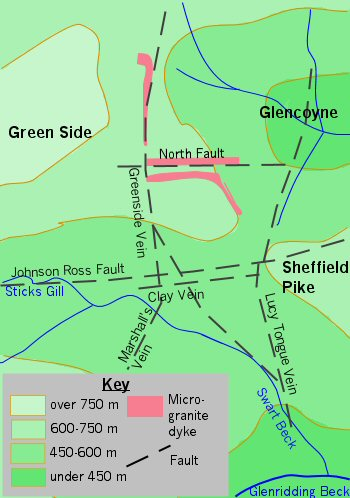
Topography of the area around Greenside Mine, showing geological dykes and faults

The entire production of the Greenside Mine came from a single mineral vein, which filled a north–south oriented fault running through the east ridge of the Green Side mountain.

Green Side is composed of andesite rock, part of the Borrowdale Volcanic Group, formed during the Ordovician Period, roughly 450 million years ago. This rests on shales of the older Skiddaw Group, which were encountered in the lowest levels of the mine. A small dyke of porphyritic microgranite (Note: This rock was called quartz-porphyry in the older literature, for example, in Gough) which has "a dog's-leg shape" in plan was intruded into these rocks during the Devonian Period; this formed a plane of weakness which controlled the position of the fault.

The Greenside fault is a normal fault with an average dip of 70° to the east. A fault plane is not a flat surface and the actual dip of the Greenside fault varies between 58° east and vertical; in one place it was 83° west. As the rock fractured and the two sides moved against each other, cavities were created, partly filled with broken rock (fault breccia and fault gouge). Hydrothermal circulation of sea water at temperatures of 110–130 °C, probably during the Carboniferous Period, led to mineralisation of the fault cavities. The metal content is believed to have been leached out of rocks of the Skiddaw Group, or the underlying granite batholith. The mineralisation of the fault shows some vertical zonation, with baryte (barium sulphate) in the upper part of the vein, (Note: Baryte was not found below the Low Horse Level of the mine.) and small amounts of both blende (sphalerite, zinc sulphide) and chalcopyrite (copper-iron sulphide) at deeper levels.

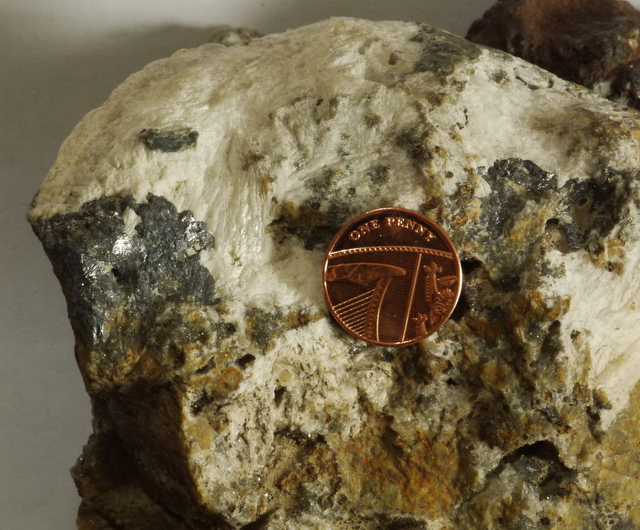
Ore from the Greenside Vein, containing baryte (white), galena (grey) and quartz (pale brown). The penny has a diameter of 20.3 mm.

The argentiferous galena (lead sulphide, containing small amounts of silver), which the miners sought, occurred as ribs, strings and dispersed pockets throughout the vein. Many strings of galena, varying in thickness between 1/8 of an inch (2 mm) and about three inches (76 mm), were interspersed through the vein, and sometimes spread into the rock on the east side of the vein (the hanging wall of the fault). The mineralised parts of the vein were mostly found in four areas, known as "ore shoots." Their position was determined by the steepness of the fault plane. In general, areas where the fault dipped at more than 70°, were mineralised, but where the dip was less than 70° the vein was barren, filled with the light coloured soft fault breccia which the miners called "chunk." The mineralised parts of the vein, at least in the lower part of the mine, had an average lead content of 7%.

The width of the vein varied from a fraction of an inch up to 30 feet (9.1 m) or more. Barren sections were generally 5 to 7 feet (1.5 to 2.1 m) wide; worked areas varied from 6 feet (1.8 m) to as much as 40 or 50 feet (12 or 15 m). (Note: An area in the South ore shoot, around the 120 fathom level was up to 40 feet (12 m) wide and was known as "the wide ground." This was immediately above the area where the fault dip was at its greatest value of 83° west.) In the upper part of the mine, where strings of lead had penetrated the hanging wall, it was sometimes worth cutting away an opening 30 to 60 feet (9.1 to 18.3 m) wide, but in the lower workings during the 1950s stopes averaged 6 feet (1.8 m) wide. Two branch veins occurred in connection with the microgranite dyke. At higher levels the vein divided and ran along both sides of the dyke. At greater depth, where the vein was within andesite to the west of the dyke, an East Branch was found in contact with the dyke.

At its southern end the vein came to an end as it approached the east-west Clay Vein by splitting into a number of small stringers, described as "a horsetail structure". All attempts to find the vein south of the Clay Vein were unsuccessful. The northern end of the vein was never determined, but all searches for lead beyond the limit of the northernmost ore shoot (about 3,600 feet (1,100 m) from the southern end) were also unsuccessful. The vertical extent of the vein was traced and worked from the top of Green Side down to the upper boundary of the Skiddaw Group, a distance of 2,600 feet (790 m). Although lead veins have been found in rocks of the Skiddaw Group elsewhere in the Lake District, the strata at Green Side were unfavourable for mineralisation; these strata therefore marked the bottom of the mine.

== Mining before 1820 ==
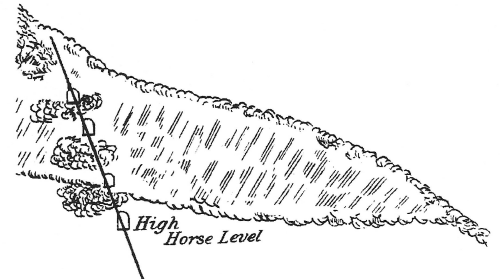
Diagram from 1890 showing the mountain-side, the line of the vein dipping to the east, and four old mine levels

It is not known when the Greenside Vein was first discovered, or when mining began there, but the amount of mining work done before 1820 suggests a date during the second half of the 1700s.

There was mining activity in Patterdale throughout the 18th century. A lease for the mining rights at Hartsop Hall Mine is dated 1696; the parish registers recorded the burials of "a washer of ore" in 1713 and of a miner from Derbyshire in 1754; a census in Patterdale in 1787 recorded 16 miners out of a male population of 165 and a writer in 1789 spoke of social changes "about thirty years ago" resulting from an influx of miners when "some lead mines were wrought in the dale." Yet there is nothing to link any of these references to Greenside.

W. T. Shaw claimed Greenside was being worked by "a party of Dutch Adventurers" (probably meaning German miners) by 1690, but cited no evidence for this, and may have been thinking of other mines in the district. David Gough claimed "the first documentary evidence of mining at Greenside" was dated 1784, but also failed to say what that evidence was. Samuel Murphy discovered what he considered "the first documentary evidence" in the form of a barrister's brief of 1799, which referred to a Mr. Thompson who was working a mine at Greenside under the Duke of Norfolk. Murphy also found a reference to Greenside in William Green's guide book of 1819. The mines were said to be "beside the road from Keswick to Patterdale" and were "till lately worked by William Sheffield Esquire," the mineral agent to the Duke of Devonshire. (Note: The reference to the Duke of Devonshire here would seem to be an error; the mineral rights were claimed by the Duke of Norfolk, as in the document from 1799.) The road mentioned is clearly the track over Sticks Pass, which passes the old workings at Greenside.

A vertical section through Greenside Mine was drawn by a consultant mining engineer in 1853. This shows three old access levels above the two levels which were in use at the time, and large areas of stoped out (worked out) ground. W. T. Shaw calculated that the old levels, known as Top Level, Middle Level and Gilgower's Level, had been driven at 40 fathoms (73 m; 240 ft), 60 fathoms (110 m; 360 ft) and 85 fathoms (155 m; 510 ft) below the summit of the ridge. (Note: Measurements of mining work used to be made in fathoms, the distance between a man's outstretched finger tips.) Samuel Murphy calculated that the three levels had been 659 metres above ordnance datum (AOD), 631 metres AOD and 581 metres AOD. These three old levels imply a lot of mining work had been done before William Sheffield abandoned the mine, some time before 1819. In addition, a fourth old level (the "Hush Level", see below) was driven in this early period, and a fifth level (later known as the "High Level", or the "High Horse Level") had been started before the mine was abandoned.

The Greenside Vein may have been discovered among the rocks at the top of Glencoyne, where it outcrops and is visible. One branch of the vein was partly cut away at the outcrop, and a bell pit known as Duke's Sump (Note: The name Duke's Sump may be a reference to the Duke of Norfolk, on whose manor it was sunk, and who owned the mineral rights.) was sunk on another branch "at some early date." Whether lead was found is not known. The vein may also have been discovered high up on the south side of Green Side. The hillside there is covered by a thick deposit of glacial boulder clay, hiding the rich lead-bearing vein from view. However, a natural gully intersected the vein high up (close to where the base of the highest of the collapse holes is today) and pieces of ore may have been found in the gully. Further down the hillside hushing has been used to reveal the position of the vein, by releasing a dammed up stream to wash away the boulder clay.

A survey of the surface features at Greenside Mine in the early 1990s found no sign of the Top Level. Of the Middle Level it found a shallow surface cutting at 627 metres AOD, a hole where the roof of the level had collapsed, a small waste heap, and a steep sled track running down the hillside from this point. The remains of a smithy were found lower down, near the base of the middle collapse hole, where there was a flat area at 584 metres AOD, with the foundations of a building and a scattering of coal, coke, slag and iron. Gilgower's level was identified with a waste heap and entrance cutting at 582 metres AOD. Below this was evidence of another level, driven at an elevation of 572 metres AOD. With a stone-walled entrance cutting and a substantial waste heap it appeared to be a major level, and had been driven from the bottom of the prospecting hush mentioned above. This level was not shown on the mine plan of 1853, and Murphy named it the Hush Level. A shallow water channel ran from its mouth and seemed to have drained the mine for a considerable time. The earliest Ordnance Survey map of the area, the 1861 map of Westmorland at a scale of 1:2,500, shows two mine levels, corresponding to Gilgower's Level and the Hush Level. Both are marked "Old Mine" showing they were no longer in use at that late date.

Once the ore had been brought out of the mine it had to be separated from rock and other vein minerals (gangue). The surface survey found evidence of an early dressing floor beside the marsh on the valley floor, at 550 metres AOD, where a little stream provided a small source of water. In that area were found many pieces of very weathered galena. It also found the washings had later been moved to another area beside the marsh, which could be supplied with a more reliable water supply. A leat had collected water from the original stream, 36 metres above the old dressing floor, and conducted it to some small storage ponds further east, which could collect from other sources as well. However the site of the new washing floor had been destroyed by a later mine building. After the ore had been dressed it was taken by packhorses over Sticks Pass to a smelter at Stoneycroft in the Newlands Valley, near Keswick.

== Business issues ==
The Greenside Mining Syndicate was formed "near the end of the 18th century" according to W. T. Shaw. The source of this information is not known but Samuel Murphy thought that this syndicate was "probably William Sheffield's company."

=== 1825 to 1880 ===
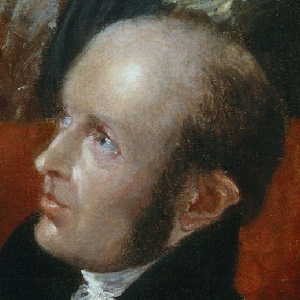
George Head Head in 1840, the principal shareholder of the Greenside Mining Company from 1835 to 1876

The Greenside Mining Company was formed in the 1820s to reopen and work the abandoned mine. Four local businessmen were behind this venture, led by Thomas Cant, a successful grocer in the nearby town of Penrith. They took control of the mine in early 1825, as reported by The Westmorland Gazette on 26 March 1825. Four miners were employed initially and mining operations were supervised by a mine agent.

Two local landowners (Note: Henry Howard of Greystoke Castle, who owned the manor of Glencoynedale, and William Marshall, who had bought the manor of Glenridding in 1824, both claimed the mine was on their land) claimed the mineral rights of the area where the mine was situated. Fortunately, they came to an amicable agreement in December 1826 which gave them joint ownership of a defined area around the mine and equal shares of the royalties from the produce of the mine. They then granted a fourteen-year lease to the new company on 31 May 1827 in return for 1/9th of the value of the smelted lead, and the following day, 1 June 1827, a partnership agreement was signed by ten shareholders in the company.

Thomas Cant died in 1831. Changes in share ownership over the next few years gave control of the company to a new group of men. The principal shareholder was George Head Head, a Quaker banker from Carlisle, who owned 18 of the 64 shares by 1835. A new mine agent was appointed in 1832, and mining operations were greatly expanded, with 90 men being employed by 1834. A major investment was needed to access ore beneath the current level of the mine, but this meant driving a new level in barren ground for hundreds of yards. To safeguard their investment the company negotiated a fourteen-year extension to their lease (in 1835), giving them security until 1862.

In 1853 the company again sought an extended lease. Again they were planning a new even lower level to exploit ore reserves at greater depths in the mine, and this would require years of work. This time the landowners took the opportunity to introduce some changes to the terms of the lease. William Marshall in particular was critical of the company's lack of engineering expertise and poor long-term planning. A key provision of the new lease was the appointment of an independent consultant engineer as mineral agent, paid for by the company but appointed jointly by the landowners and the company. Other provisions sought to mitigate some of the nuisances caused by a working mine in the area, from pollution of the river and the lake, to the state of the roads and the cleanliness of the workers’ accommodation.

In the fifty years to 1876 Greenside produced about 60,000 long tons (61,000 tonnes) of ore, which had yielded 40,000 long tons (41,000 tonnes) of lead, worth £800,000, and 600,000 ounces (17 tonnes) of silver, worth £150,000. Profits of £300,000 (Note: In terms of purchasing power, £300,000 in 1876 was the equivalent of 23.2 million pounds at 2011 values) had been divided among the shareholders.

=== 1880 to 1920 ===
Poor economic conditions in the 1880s, part of a worldwide economic recession known as the long depression, created financial difficulties for the mine. The lead price had fallen by 50%, and reached a minimum of £10.69 (Note: In terms of purchasing power, £10.69 in 1884 was the equivalent of £914 at 2011 values) per ton in 1884, the result of large-scale imports of cheap foreign lead. No dividends were paid to shareholders for the seven years from 1881 to 1887, and in 1884 a call was made on shareholders of £25 per share, (Note: In terms of purchasing power, £25 in 1884 was the equivalent of £2,140 at 2011 values) the first time this had ever been necessary. Even the royalties due to the landowners could not be paid in 1884. The debt was carried over and repaid over the next ten years. Royalties in fact consumed 69% of the working profit of the mine during the decade from 1880 to 1890 as they were based on the amount of lead produced. This was in spite of a new lease which reduced royalties to 1/12 part of the lead produced, signed on 16 November 1883.

At the same time there had been changes among the shareholders of the mine. George Head Head had died in 1876 and Miles MacInnes, his adopted heir, became the principal shareholder. Two other large shareholders died in 1882. MacInnes was discouraged by the prospects of the mine and disposed of all his shares in 1884 following the £25 call on them. But new directors, led by Robert Bradshaw Smith and John Pattinson, began to increase production and cut costs. At a time when many British lead mines were closing, these men decided to face the financial challenges and keep the mine working. The mine returned to profitability and began paying dividends again in the financial year 1888/89.

The Greenside Mining Company Ltd. was created in October 1889 to give shareholders the protection of limited liability in this challenging time. The old company was wound up; its lease and other assets were sold to the new company for £61,440. (Note: In terms of purchasing power, £61,440 in 1889 was the equivalent of 5.57 million pounds at 2011 values) (Note: The new company had nominal capital value of £76,800 in the form of 7,980 £10 shares credited with £8 having been paid up, which limited shareholders’ liabilities to the unpaid £2 per share.) One hundred and twenty shares in the new company were allotted to each of the sixty four shares in the old company.

One of the first acts of the new company was to employ an experienced mining engineer as their chief mine agent. Captain W. H. Borlase (Note: Captain William Henry Borlase was from Cornwall and he continued to use the Cornish title, Mine Captain, throughout his life.) was recruited for his ability to manage mines under difficult circumstances. His approach was to work the mine as economically as possible by reducing the labour costs while maintaining or improving production rates. He did so by introducing the latest technical innovations such as electrical power and equipment to the mine.

A new 21-year lease was negotiated in 1901 and to cope with changing market conditions royalties were set on a scale which depended on the price of lead, varying from 1/30 when it was below £10 per ton, to 1/10 when the price was above £17 per ton.

World War I in 1914–1918 pushed up demand for lead and the market price, but the output of the mine fell as a result of three factors: poor ore, a shortage of miners, and two very dry summers which severely reduced the water supply to the power house. By 1918 production had fallen to 600 tons per year and essential development work of ore reserves had not been done. In 1919 negotiations for the renewal of the lease were begun, and the company, aware of their dire financial position, sought a reduction of the royalties payable. But the landowners (Note: The new landowners in 1919 were Mr. W. H. Marshall and Lady Mabel Howard.) and their advisors rejected all the company's suggestions. As a result, the company went into voluntary liquidation in November 1920.

=== 1920 to 1935 ===
Attempts to sell the mine, or its assets, came to nothing. Eventually Captain Borlase, who had retired in 1919, proposed a new investment by the old shareholders and negotiated new terms with the landowners. Shareholders agreed to a reconstruction of the company which involved allotting four new £1 ordinary shares for each of the 7,680 old shares, and issuing 4,280 preference shares to raise money needed for development of the mine. (Note: The new ordinary shares were credited with 16 shillings paid (20 shillings were equivalent to £1) leaving shareholders liable for calls of up to 4 shillings per share. These shares, worth £24,576, were more than enough to purchase the mine with its buildings, plant and machinery from the liquidators (at a cost of £19,968). The 4,280 preference shares were credited with 5 shillings paid.) The new 1923 Greenside Mining Company Ltd. came into being, and the landowners agreed a dead rent of £225 per year for five years, with a reduced scale of royalties payable on top of the rent after that time.

The mine returned to profitability during the 1920s but was beset by a series of difficulties, and then a falling lead price in the 1930s. A reservoir dam collapsed in 1927, sending a catastrophic flood through Glenridding village. Fortunately no one was killed, but compensation claims cost the company over £4,500, several years' worth of profits. A replacement reservoir dam, built at a cost of nearly £11,000, also failed in August 1931 and the reservoir was then abandoned. In the same month one of the shafts in the mine collapsed, and collapsed again in December 1933. The falling lead price led to a reduction in the number of employees, from 68 to 53 in February 1931, and down to 40 in July 1932.

The chairman of the company, J. W. Pattinson, died in April 1931, after serving as chairman for 24 years. He was replaced by J. C. Kidd, another long-standing director, and Captain Borlase's son-in-law. He carefully analysed the decline in the company's profitability, concluding that the price of lead was simply too low. Operations were gradually scaled down, and a loss of £1,635 was made in the year to March 1933. The amount of proven ore reserves was still increasing, but the company was unable to finance the exploitation of new ground. Knowing the mine could be made profitable, the manager made a last attempt, in February 1934, to persuade the board of directors to inject enough capital to make Greenside a large-scale producer. No action was taken on his report and the company went into liquidation in March 1935.

=== 1936 to 1962 ===
The British Metal Corporation (BMC) was involved with the running of a large lead mine in North Wales near Pentre Halkyn, but lead reserves there were coming to an end, and when the Greenside Mine closed, BMC was already looking for a possible new venture. In 1936, BMC with a subsidiary of Associated Lead Manufactures Ltd. formed The Basinghall Mining Syndicate Ltd. (Note: The Basinghall Mining Syndicate was named from Basinghall Street in the City of London, where its registered office was located.) to explore the possibility of purchasing Greenside, believing it had only failed from a lack of working capital.

However, the company wanted to be sure that Greenside Mine contained sufficient reserves of ore to enable the large-scale mining operation which would make it profitable. They proposed taking a two-year option on the mine, during which they would refurbish the property and prove its resources, paying the landowners a dead rent of £90 per year. Many terms of the old leases they rejected as inappropriate to a large, modern mining company. They proposed a fixed royalty payment of 1/40th (5%) of the value of the lead concentrates, arguing that if the mine was worked on a large enough scale, these royalties would be quite satisfactory to the landowners.

Urgent repairs to the mine, especially to the two underground shafts, were begun immediately, and Dr. W. R. Jones of the Royal School of Mines examined the ore reserves and prospects for the mine. His preliminary report was positive, and the company began a large-scale chemical sampling programme, which also produced good results. An increase in the lead price in late 1936 also brightened the prospects for the mine. The company decided to purchase the mine from the liquidators in July 1937. (Note: Creditors of the old company were paid in full, holders of the risky preference shares received 10 shillings per share, and holders of the ordinary shares received 1 shilling per share.)

Over the next two years a lot of work was done to prepare the mine and the surface facilities for high production three-shift working. By September 1939 the two parent companies had invested £160,000 in share capital and £57,000 in loans to finance the venture, and the company's balance sheet showed a loss of £79,712 following the major expenditure that had been incurred. But by 1940 Greenside Mine had become the largest producer of lead ore in the United Kingdom. Over 220 people were employed at the mine in 1941, when production peaked at over 5,000 tons of lead per year. However, this did not immediately translate into profits because of high development costs, and operating losses continued to be made until 1941

World War II had begun in 1939, just as the large-scale working of the mine began. Lead was a nationally important commodity, and the wartime Ministry of Supply wanted to take over the mine and acquire its entire lead output. A contract was agreed in July 1942, under which the Ministry paid for the operating costs of the mine, for all approved development work and for any plant or equipment needed. The company continued to run the mine on behalf of the Ministry, and in lieu of profits were paid 30 shillings (Note: In terms of purchasing power, 30 shillings in 1942 was the equivalent of £57.40 at 2011 values) for each dry ton of lead concentrates. This agreement lasted until the end of June 1944.

The high level of production proved to be unsustainable. Development work of new reserves could not keep pace with the production of 6,000 tons of crude ore per month. In January 1943 production had to be scaled down, and the ore dressing mill reduced to a single shift per day. But a bigger blow was to follow. In May 1943, as one of the shafts was being deepened, the miners encountered bands of soft, black shale. The Ministry sent in a team of Canadian Engineers with diamond drilling equipment, and this confirmed that the Skiddaw Group of rocks lay at about 217 fathoms (397 m) below the main entrance to the mine (The Lucy Level), not at 300 fathoms (550 m) as the geologists had predicted. The rich bonanza of ore the company had expected was not there.

A programme of surface prospecting was undertaken at once in an attempt to find a lateral extension of the vein. The hillside was covered with a thick layer of peat, and a number of Italian prisoners of war were employed to try to trace the outcrop of the vein. To help with the search, an electrical resistivity survey was carried out towards the end of 1943, and trenches were dug to investigate places on Hart Side where there were promising indications. However, only small stringers of barren quartz were found there. Underground prospecting was also done, by extending both the Lucy Level and the 120 Fathom Level to the north, but without success. A thorough review of the geology by the British Geological Survey in February 1944 pointed the way to some small deposits of ore but confirmed that no major extension to the reserves existed.

When the mine was returned to the company in June 1944, production was scaled down and thirty men were discharged. The manager began to plan how best to work the mine to keep it in profit, while making sure no ore reserves would be lost when the mine did close. Everything possible was done to control costs and maximise income. But this was not the high output mine the Basinghall Mining Syndicate had seen itself running, and they announced production would cease in 1946. However, in the year to September 1946 the mine made its best profit to date, of £19,926. (Note: In terms of purchasing power, £19,926 in 1946 was the equivalent of £678,000 at 2011 values) A steady development programme kept production constant, and with a good lead price the company was content to leave the mine open.

It is probable that the Basinghall Mining Syndicate went into liquidation in 1954 because a new company called Greenside Mines Ltd. was set up in March 1954 to run the mine. Finally in 1958 the decision was made not to finance any further development work at the mine, to draw out the remaining ore and close at the end of 1959.

Just before the mine was due to close, the company was offered a reasonable fee to allow the Atomic Weapons Research Establishment (AWRE) to conduct an experiment in detecting seismic signals from underground explosions as part of Operation Orpheus. (Note: Murphy's chapter on Operation Orpheus is also available on the Patterdale Today and Subterranea Britannica websites.) When the testing programme was completed in August 1960, control of the mine returned to the Greenside company. The last of the ore was stripped out by April 1961, equipment was sold off, most of the buildings were demolished and the site cleaned up. The final twelve workmen were paid off in January 1962.

== Underground workings ==
=== In the mountain-side ===
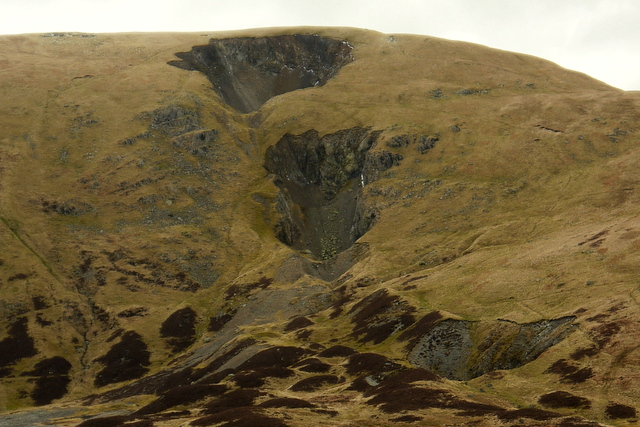
A series of large holes on the side of Green Side mountain, formed by the collapse of the old mine workings underneath

The 18th-century mine workings began from adits driven into the sloping hillside along the line of the vein. These were known as the Top Level, Middle Level and Gilgower's Level. As each level was extended further into the hill, ore was obtained by cutting rises above the levels, or sumps below them. The ore was usually removed by overhead stoping (called "roofing" locally), that is, by cutting away the roof of a level. Wooden working platforms were built above the level, supported on heavy beams wedged between the two sides of the vein. The ore was dropped down from the stopes to the level below, filled into wooden wheelbarrows and wheeled out. In places the workings could be as much as 60 feet (18 m) wide where the vein had split into two distinct branches, or fissures to the east had been mineralised. These workings were left open with no support and the large holes on the hillside today show where they eventually collapsed.

The High Horse Level (Note: The High Horse Level was often known as the High Level. When it was first driven it was presumably known simply as the Horse Level, since there was no lower level at that time.) had been started before the mine was abandoned in the 1810s, from the lowest possible point on the floor of the upper valley beneath Green Side. It was made wide enough and straight enough to allow horses to pull wagons of ore along it on narrow-gauge wooden rails. The new company drove this level forward, and in 1828 it broke through to a sump (a vertical working) which had been made below Gilgower's Level. This created natural ventilation in the mine, and enabled the work to be expanded. By 1834 92 men were employed underground. The High Horse Level was continued northwards and in 1837 it crossed the northern boundary of the area shared by the two landowners.

=== Below the High Horse Level ===
To reach ore lower than the High Horse Level, access levels had to be driven from much further away, or shafts had to be sunk within the mine.

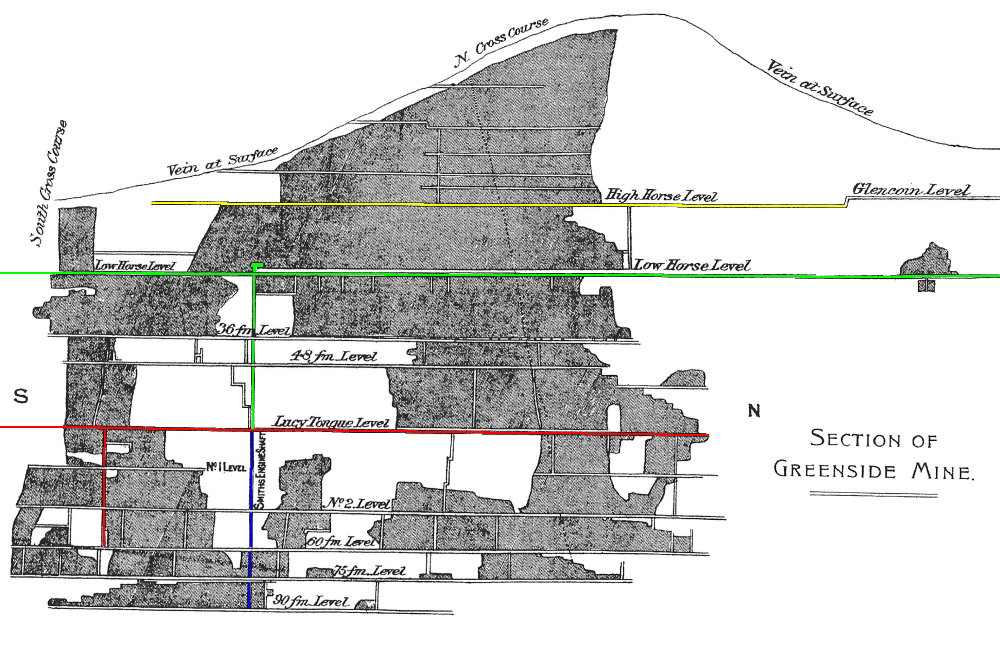
Vertical section through Greenside Mine in about 1910, with the High Horse Level highlighted in yellow, the Low Horse Level and Low Level Engine Shaft in green, the Lucy Tongue Level and Lucy Engine Shaft in red, and Smith's Shaft in blue. Worked out stopes are shaded.

In 1835 a Low Level (or Low Horse Level) was begun from the side of the ravine which carries the Swart Beck from the upper valley down to the lower valley of Glenridding, a point over 33 fathoms (60 m) lower than the High Level. A wooden bridge over the ravine from a narrow terrace on the west side gave access to the new level. From this point the miners had to excavate a distance of 440 yards (400 m) to reach the vein, work which took nearly six years to complete and cost around £2,500. (Note: In terms of present day costs, £2,500 in 1835 was the equivalent of £265,000 at 2011 values) The new level was driven towards the Greenside vein by following two other soft but barren veins where possible. The vein was reached at the end of 1840, but far to the south of the higher workings, and in barren ground. Levels were driven both north and south from this point. The one to the south, known as Marshall's Level, was driven more than 100 fathoms (180 m), but no lead was found. But the level to the north discovered the South Ore Shoot, a new lead-rich part of the vein in 1844. During the nineteenth century natural ventilation was adequate in the many interconnected levels of the mine. In blind headings a fan blast, worked by a boy, was used, or in very long drives a more powerful waterblast drove air down cast iron pipes to within a few yards of the miners at the forehead.

At the same time work continued in other parts of the mine. The old Top Level was cleared out in 1842, and then driven forward. Some work was done in the old Middle Level in 1845. From 1842 to 1844 the Glencoyne Level was driven from the head of Glencoyne to explore the vein much further north, beneath the old workings known as Duke's Sump. When the vein was reached, headings were driven both north and south, and further cross-cuts made to look for other branches of the vein, but no ore was found in this area. Ore above the High Horse Level was still being worked and provided most of the mine's output.

The first mine shaft at Greenside was sunk in 1851–52 to give access to ore beneath the Low Level. This was known as the Engine Shaft (or Willie Shaft) and was sunk from a point 360 yards (330 m) north of where the level had first reached the vein. Initially the shaft was sunk 36 fathoms (66 m) and a new 36 Fathom Level was driven from the bottom. Two hydraulic engines were installed at the top of the shaft, one for winding and one for pumping out water. (Note: The shaft was called the Willie Shaft because William Glenwright was the first driver who worked these engines.) The water power for running these engines came from a reservoir created in the High Horse Level. That level had been driven northwards in an unsuccessful search for ore, and its forehead was not far from the southern end of the Glencoyne Level, though about 30 feet (9.1 m) lower. The two levels were connected, the floor of the Glencoyne Level was regraded so water would run in, not out, and a small stream diverted into the mouth of the level. A dam was built across the High Horse Level, and pipes ran down to the hydraulic engines. The shaft was extended to the 48 Fathom Level in 1865–66, though that level had been started in 1858 from a sump, sunk on the vein from the 36 Fathom Level. Eventually, in 1880, the shaft was sunk a further 32 fathoms (59 m) to connect with the Lucy Level.

Another even lower access level was driven between 1854 and 1868 from a point just above the Smelt Mill, near the bottom of the Swart Beck, 82 fathoms (150 m) lower than the Low Level. This was the Lucy Tongue Level (often referred to as the Lucy Level) (Note: The Lucy Tongue Level was named from the Lucy Tongue fault, which ran in a north-south direction through Lucy’s Tongue, a tongue of land on Sheffield Pike between Swart Beck and an unnamed stream to its east. The new level followed the easier ground of this fault as far north as the soft east-west Clay Vein.) which later became the main entrance to the mine until it closed in 1962. The level was driven northwards following the Lucy Tongue fault, but progress was very slow. (Note: By 1864 it had been driven 800 yards (730 m), averaging only 76 yards (69 m) per year and was over five years behind schedule.) Then the miners encountered the Clay Vein, a strong barren vein with a soft clay filling, and followed it to the west. While the soft sides and fragile roof needed supporting in places with stone arches, progress was much quicker. Finally they turned north-west through solid rock, to reach the Greenside Vein 1,200 yards (1,100 m) from the entrance, and five years ahead of schedule.

During the 1850s and 1860s some ore was still being won from the old levels in the top of the mountain, but the main ore-producing stopes were above and below the High and Low Levels. By the end of the 1850s the Low Level had been driven 550 yards (500 m) north of the Engine Shaft. Below it, the 36 Fathom Level was being extended in both directions. Although ore was at first very patchy in that level, stopes had been opened above it in both headings by 1858, and also a sump had gone down to 48 fathoms, where a new level was being driven. A major rock fall occurred in 1862 (or 1865), known as "The Big Crush." Miners had cut away two parallel strings of lead ore above the High Horse Level, leaving an unsupported pendant of rock between them. This rock, 28 fathoms (51 m) in length and depth, and 8 to 10 fathoms (15 to 18 m) thick, fell, crushing its way down the stope to the level below, and removing the floor of Gilgower's Level above. Fortunately this happened one Sunday, when no one was in the mine. In 1870 the new Lucy Tongue Level was connected to the south end of the 48 Fathom Level, by sinking a sump from above and working a rise from below. Already the new level had discovered some rich ore at the south end of the vein, and in the following years it was steadily driven north.

=== Below the Lucy Tongue Level ===
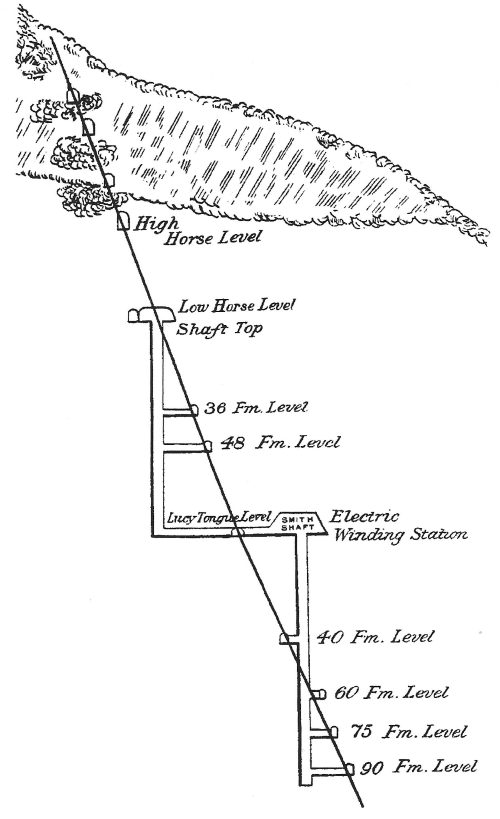
Captain Borlase's sketch showing the Low Level Shaft and Smith's Shaft, several mine levels and the dip of the vein.

A second engine shaft (known as the Lucy Engine Shaft) was begun in 1871 from the Lucy Tongue Level, and in 1874 work began on the 20 Fathom Level (also known as No. 1 Level). A hydraulic winding engine and a water pump were installed at the top of the shaft in 1875. Over time this shaft was deepened to the 40 Fathom Level (or No. 2 Level), and in 1890 to the 60 Fathom Level. This shaft was sunk in the hard footwall rock west of the vein, and proved to be very hard work. Compressed air rock drills and dynamite were used for the first time at the mine. Before this, all shot holes had been bored by hand and charged with gunpowder. The 40 Fathom Level was the first to encounter the Middle Ore Shoot, where the most solid galena ever seen in the Greenside Vein was found, though at greater depths this ore shoot was variable in its quality.

In 1880 the Low Level Shaft was extended to the Lucy Tongue Level. The company employed an outside contractor to do this work. Warsop and Hill used their own rock drills and the more powerful blasting gelatine. Impressed by this technology, the company installed an air compressor in 1884 and bought a number of the rock drills from the contractors. These contractors also drove the crosscut which was needed to connect the bottom of the shaft to the Lucy Tongue Level. This crosscut, 50 yards (46 m) long, was known as Warsop's Crosscut

When Captain Borlase arrived as the chief agent (mine manager) in 1889 it was clear that the engine shaft in the Lucy Level had been sunk too far to the south to work the long stretch of good ore that had been found near its northern end. Also, having been sunk into the footwall, longer and longer cross-cuts were needed to reach the vein from it. Another problem was that limited water resources would place limits on the winding and pumping capacities of the hydraulic engines as the mine deepened. Borlase proposed bold solutions to both problems. First he proposed building a hydroelectric power station further up the Glenridding valley, where water supply was abundant, but could not easily be used in the mine. Electricity could then be used for pumps and winding engines as well as for powering a locomotive. The electric winders and locomotive were to be the first ones installed in a metalliferous mine in Britain. Borlase also proposed a new engine shaft 147 yards (134 m) north of the existing shaft, to be sunk initially in the hanging wall, from an eastern extension to Warsop's Crosscut. This (the third shaft at the mine) became known as Smith's Shaft, in honour of Robert Bradshaw Smith, one of the directors and the principal shareholder. Smith's Shaft is about one mile (1.6 km) from the entrance to the Lucy Tongue Level.

Work on the power station began in 1890. The narrow, winding Lucy Tongue Level was made ready for locomotive working during 1892, and the sinking of the new shaft began in the same year. The locomotive began work in 1893 and was able to haul all the mine's output, replacing six horses. (Note: Horses continued to be employed on lower levels in the mine, to tram the ore from the stopes to the shaft.) Before this, much of the output had been taken up to the Low Level because of limited haulage capacity in the Lucy Level, but this now ceased and ore handling facilities at the entrance to the Low Level were no longer needed. The Low Level engine shaft was no longer needed, and the winding engine was removed.

Over the next decade Smith's Shaft was sunk to the 40 Fathom Level, the 60 Fathom Level, and in 1899 to the 75 Fathom Level. In 1896 it was fitted with cages and an electric winding engine, and the old Lucy Engine Shaft was abandoned in 1899. By 1902 all ore production from above the Lucy Level had ceased. In 1904 Smith's Shaft was extended to the 90 Fathom Level which became the major working level for many years. A small patch of ore above the north end of the Lucy Tongue Level was opened up in the 1890s, known as the Alma Workings. Gelignite was introduced in the 1890s, replacing both blasting gelatine and gunpowder. The first carbide lamps were introduced at Greenside from 1909 onwards; before then all work had been done by candlelight.

=== Below the 90 Fathom Level ===
Smith's Shaft was 100 feet (30 m) into the footwall at the 90 Fathom Level, so rather than extend it any deeper a new shaft was sunk from that level. This was an inclined shaft which followed the dip of the vein. It was sunk in 1910 from a point just north of the cross-cut at the bottom of Smith's Shaft and was known as the Skip Shaft. It was designed purely for haulage, although a ladderway was put in at the side. The skip was a large steel container with small wheels running on wooden guides. It was lowered to a chute below a working level and wagons of ore were tipped into it. It was then brought up to the 90 Fathom Level, tipped up and the ore in it dropped into other wagons to be taken along the cross-cut to Smith's Shaft. The 105 Fathom Level was developed from the Skip Shaft in 1911, and in 1917–18 the shaft was deepened to the 120 Fathom Level. It worked well, but there was no way to get horses down to the lower levels, so tramming had to be done by hand. So in 1916 a new cage shaft, later to be known as Murray's Shaft, was begun by extending a sump from the 90 Fathom Level, at a point 33 yards (30 m) south of the cross-cut from Smith's Shaft. This was another inclined shaft, but it was designed for winding cages so wagons, men and horses could all travel up and down it. However work ceased in 1918 while it was still 4 fathoms (7.3 m) short of the 120 Fathom Level and no further work was done on it before the company went into liquidation in 1920.

Once the new company had been formed in 1923, Murray's Shaft was connected to the 120 Fathom Level, and then the Skip Shaft was abandoned. The 120 Fathom Level became a major production level in the mine for the next thirty years. Murray's Shaft was deepened to the 135 Fathom Level in 1924 and to the 150 Fathom Level in 1928. Production during the early 1930s came from the four new levels below the 90 Fathom Level. However, Murray's Shaft had been sunk on the vein in some rich ore-bearing ground which had been stoped away. Although the shaft was supported with steel girders and timbers, and the empty stope had been backfilled with rock, it was prone to collapses, when the supports gave way and waste rock poured into it. This happened (twice) in 1931 and again in 1933, bringing production to a halt while it was repaired.

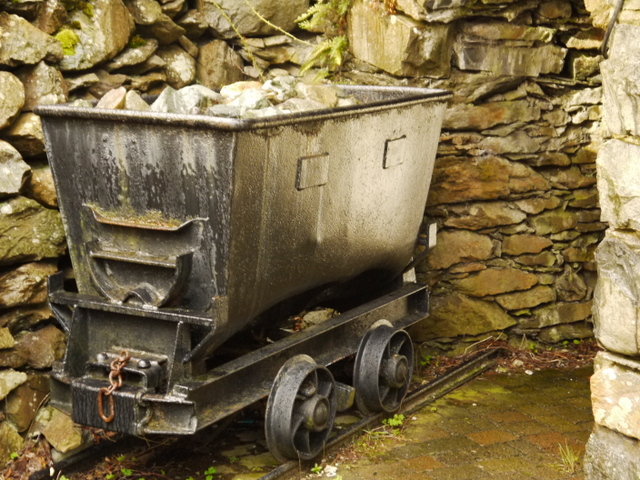
One of the side-tipping wagons introduced in 1938, now positioned outside Helvellyn Greenside Youth Hostel

As soon as the Basinghall Mining Syndicate took control of the mine in 1936 urgent repair work was done on both Smith's Shaft and Murray's Shaft. The 150 Fathom Level had flooded and needed to be pumped out, and roof falls on other levels needed clearing. After buying the mine in 1937 the Lucy Tongue Level was refurbished. Roof falls needed clearing and retimbering, the worst of the sharp bends were straightened out, and some narrow stone-arched sections were rebuilt. All the rails were replaced, as was the nearly fifty-year-old locomotive, and new side-tipping wagons were introduced. At the same time Murray's Shaft was deepened and a new 175 Fathom Level was begun from the bottom. A small battery locomotive was installed for tramming on that level. Horses were still used on the other levels, but in time they too were replaced by battery locomotives.

Murray's Shaft was deepened again to the 200 Fathom Level about 1940, but that development was abandoned when it was found that the winding engine could not lift ore from that depth, and a new engine was unobtainable during the war. Instead a series of winzes were sunk from various places along the 175 Fathom Level. The new company had introduced a system of coordinates to specify locations within the mine, centred on Smith's Shaft. Thus the 940N Winze was 940 feet (290 m) north of Smith's Shaft (even though that shaft did not connect with the 175 Fathom Level.) The 940N Winze was sunk in 1939 to a new 200 Fathom Level in the heart of the rich North Ore Shoot. In 1943 the Capital Winze was sunk at 1400N and 214 Fathom sublevels were driven north and south from it. Another winze at 530S was started, but suspended when it encountered quantities of water.

As the North Ore Shoot was growing richer with depth, work began in 1943 on the North Shaft, another inclined shaft for winding cages, 1,800 feet (550 m) north from the bottom of Murray's Shaft. It was while this shaft was being sunk that shales from the Skiddaw Group of rocks were first encountered at about 217 fathoms (397 m) below the Lucy Tongue Level. Soon afterwards shale also appeared in the 214 Fathom north sublevel. The fault continued in these rocks but it contained no ore. Work on the shaft was stopped and the 217 Fathom Level was developed to draw ore from the rich stopes just above the shale. A short, rich section of ore south of the shale was followed down to the 237 Fathom Level, the lowest level in the mine, roughly 100 m below sea level.

It was in the North Shaft that a fire occurred in 1952, which caused the greatest single loss of life in the mine's entire history. An electrical fault one weekend may have started the fire. When the men went to work on the Monday morning (7 July 1952), the air compressor was started up, and air from a broken air line fanned the flames, releasing poisonous carbon monoxide gas which began to circulate round the mine. Some of the men began to collapse when they reached the 175 Fathom Level. Four men who had descended the 940N Winze were killed, and rescuers were driven out of the mine by the gas. The bodies could not be recovered until 16 July, and the mine did not reopen until 1 September.

During the 1950s the South Ore Shoot had been exhausted and workings below the 175 Fathom Level at the south end were abandoned and allowed to flood. Exploration was continued in all likely areas, from diamond drilling in the Glencoyne Level at the north end, to an extension of the 175 Fathom Level beyond the Clay Vein at the south end. Good pockets of ore were found in some places and production actually remained higher than in the mid-19th century. In 1954 a second exit from the mine was created as an emergency escape route. This led through the Alma workings to the Low Horse Level, up an old sump into the High Horse Level, through the old brick dam and out through the Glencoyne Level. The shafts were fitted with climbing ladders, and the route was inspected weekly.

== Ore processing ==
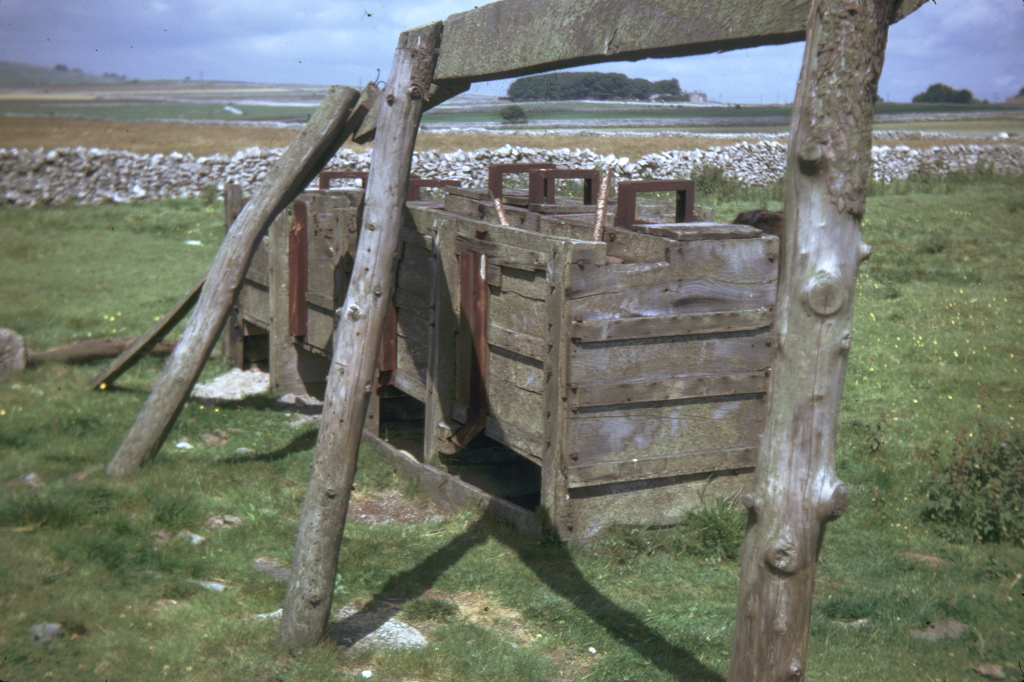
Hotching tubs used to separate galena from gangue minerals at Magpie Mine, a lead mine in Derbyshire

Three processes were involved in extracting lead from the ore brought out of the mine. First the ore had to be crushed to liberate the galena in it from the gangue minerals. Then the galena was separated from the other minerals, using some form of gravity separation process, or (after 1938) a froth flotation process. Finally the concentrated galena was smelted in a furnace to extract the metallic lead from it.

After 1825 a horse tramway led from the High Horse Level round the edge of the marsh to a picking floor near the top of the Swart Beck. Here, pieces of waste rock were separated from ore by hand and dumped. The ore was then crushed, originally by hand using wide-headed hammers (called buckers). A crushing mill was erected in about 1827, probably using a roller crusher powered by a water wheel, although this still required ore to be broken by hand (known as "knocking") into pieces less than 3 inches (76 mm) in size. Water was also used to separate the galena from the gangue in hotching tubs. These worked by jigging the crushed mixed ore up and down in a tub of water; the heavier galena worked its way to the bottom of the swirling mixture and the lighter gangue to the top. There were probably no slime pits at this date, so very fine lead ore and mud in the water polluted the beck and the lake. Until 1828 the concentrated ore was taken to the High Wath smelter at Caldbeck.

The Greenside smelt mill was built in 1827–28, (Note: The smelt mill was built at a cost of £340, paid for by the landowners, which the company repaid, with interest, at the rate of £17 per year. In terms of present day costs, £340 in 1828 was the equivalent of £31,600 at 2011 values.) down in the Glenridding valley at the bottom of the Swart Beck, where there was a good water supply and where fuel could be brought up the valley without too much difficulty. Inside the mill there was probably a furnace to prepare the ore and a single ore hearth. The air blast was produced by bellows powered by a water wheel. Further buildings were erected in the 1830s, to house a slag hearth furnace, and a silver refinery. There was no extended chimney: clouds of toxic lead oxides and acid sulphurous fumes would have made the valley an unhealthy place. The flue was built in 1841 to a chimney 150 m up the hillside; in 1855 it was extended to a chimney on the ridge above. Later, loops were added to increase its length. This long flue not only removed the noxious fumes, it also enabled the lead-rich dust to be recovered and returned to the smelter. The flue was built as a stone-arched cutting, following or cut into the bedrock. This served as a giant prospecting cross-cut and proved there was no extension to the Greenside Vein to the south.

Completion of the Low Horse Level in the 1840s meant that new ore dressing facilities were needed at a lower level than at the old High Mill. A new Low Mill was built near the smelt mill, with a self-acting incline to lower wagons of ore to the new mill. There it was crushed, washed, and the concentrated ore was delivered to the smelt mill. Leats from Glenridding Beck brought a plentiful supply of water to operate the machinery at the mill. Increased ore production in the 1840s also meant that the smelting capacity had to be increased. One reverberatory furnace seems to have been installed in 1844, with more in 1851. These could process much larger amounts of lead ore, but were expensive to run, consuming large amounts to coal, and needing frequent replacements of their fireclay brick linings. They were soon abandoned and a number of the simpler ore hearths were installed in 1855. Since these produced greater quantities of lead dust and fumes, the flue was extended at the same time to the new chimney.

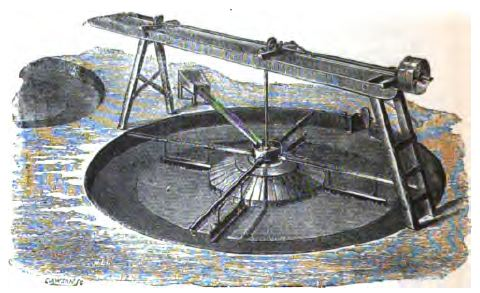
Diagram of a round buddle, with fine material being sprayed into the pit from four revolving heads

The 1853 lease required the company to reduce the pollution being washed out of its mills and down the beck. Slime pits were dug to catch the fine sands and slimes, which were then treated in a number of circular buddles. In these, water-borne fine sands were sprayed onto a sloping conical floor. Heavy lead-rich sands and muds settled near the centre of the buddle and lighter waste flowed to the edges. They helped both to increase lead recovery and reduce pollution.

When the Lucy Tongue Level was completed in 1869, its entrance was below the ore hoppers at the foot of the incline from the Low Horse Level. A water-powered incline was built to take the ore up to those hoppers, though this involved a considerable amount of reorganisation in the area. Labour shortages in 1870 led to further mechanisation of the labour-intensive ore washing. A new oscillating jaw crusher eliminated the need for initial hand-knocking of the ore, and was powered by a high-pressure water turbine. Hotching tubs, even when mechanised, still needed constant supervision, and were replaced by newly available automated fixed-sieve jigging machines. These still involved forcing water up and down through the bed of ore, but the sieves, covered with a three-inch (76 mm) layer of galena, were stationary; material of the same density passed through the bed but lighter material was washed into the next sieve down the line. They were very effective and enabled a complete separation of galena and gangue.

In the 1890s, Captain Borlase's efforts to save labour costs involved improvements to the mill, making it a continuous process. Ore from the mine was separated into three size fractions before crushing the larger ones. The crushed ore was passed through cylindrical trommels so that fractions of different sizes could be sent to separate jigs. Vibrating tables replaced some of the round buddles to treat fine material, and an effort was made to recover some of the zinc blende in the ore, but this seems not to have been successful. Water provided the motive power in the mill. Smelting and refining remained labour-intensive and costly. In 1903 the decision was made to stop separating the silver and to sell argentiferous lead to a smelting company. This created an overall saving of 14 shillings (Note: In terms of present day costs, 14 shillings in 1903 was equivalent to £72.70 at 2011 values.) per ton of lead sold, roughly £750 per year. With labour shortages during World War I and reduced ore production, it was decided to cease smelting altogether in 1917 and sell the lead concentrates.

When the Basinghall Mining Syndicate took over the mine in 1936 all the old equipment in the mill was removed and a completely new electrically powered plant was designed for high production rates. The entire output of the mine was crushed in a ball mill to the size of fine sand before being passed into a bank of froth flotation cells. In these, organic oils and acids caused the galena particles to become attached to rising air bubbles to form a grey foam which overflowed a weir at the top. These gave a good separation: concentrates averaged 75% galena and the waste tailings only 0.2% galena. The concentrate was dried, conveyed to ore-bins and then hand-loaded onto lorries for carriage to smelting mills at Ryton near Newcastle upon Tyne. However the ball mill was unable to cope with the high volumes of ore in the early 1940s. New concentrating tables were introduced. By the 1950s these processed 60% of the ore and produced concentrates of 82% galena. The remaining 40% of ore went to the ball mill and froth flotation plant.

== Transport ==
The mine was in a remote mountain valley. The lead and silver produced had to be transported out; coal, timber, explosives and other supplies had to be transported in. The number of carts travelling to and from the mine must have caused considerable damage to the roads to Penrith. To reduce this damage, the 1853 lease specified that half the carts used must have axles four inches (100 mm) longer than the other half. When the Cockermouth, Keswick and Penrith Railway was opened in the 1860s, this road traffic went to Troutbeck railway station, saving six miles (9.7 km) each way.

In 1903 the Greenside Company set up its own road haulage business. The Penrith & District Road Carrying Company was formed and operated two steam wagons with several trailers. One of these with its trailers was commandeered by the military authorities in 1917. A new Sentinel steam wagon was bought in 1924. This had a number of accidents, and ended up falling into Glenridding Beck in 1932. There it was abandoned until a steam wagon enthusiast hauled it out and restored it in 1988. A series of petrol-driven lorries served the needs of the mine from 1928 until its closure in 1935.

== Water and electrical power ==
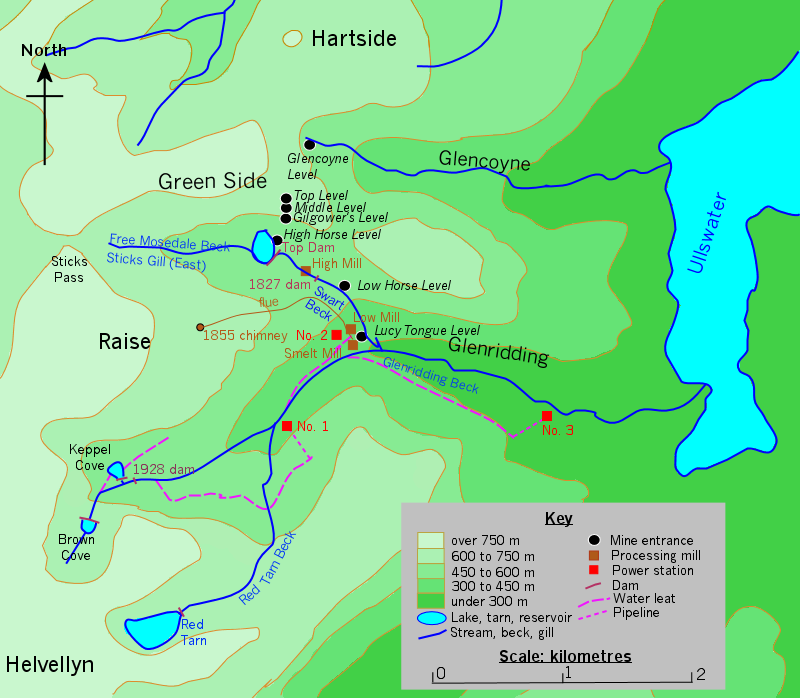
Water resources, dams, reservoirs and power stations at Greenside Mine

Before the mine was connected to the National Grid in 1938, all operations which were not done by hand (or by horse) depended ultimately on water power. In many cases this was used directly, to power hydraulic engines, water wheels or water turbines. In other cases it was used to run an air compressor to power the rock drills, or small winding engines, and from 1890 it was used to generate electricity.

The main sources of water were Free Mosedale Beck (now known as Sticks Gill East), which ran through the upper valley beneath Green Side, and then became Swart Beck as it ran more steeply down to the lower valley of Glenridding. Glenridding Beck was the other source, fed by Red Tarn, Brown Cove and Keppelcove Tarn. Over the years a series of reservoirs were created to regulate the flow of water in these becks.

Samuel Murphy has suggested that the earliest dam was built on Swart Beck in 1827 beneath a large bowl-shaped area, where its foundations may still be seen beside the beck at an elevation of 531 m AOD. This regulated the flow of water to a water wheel used to power the bellows in the smelt mill, but when the dam burst during a violent storm in 1851 the smelt mill was destroyed. It was replaced by Top Dam, built in 1851 above spoil heaps from the High Horse Level, creating a reservoir in the floor of the upper valley. This supplied water to a new and larger water wheel at the High Mill site. W. T. Shaw claimed the destruction of the smelt mill happened in the 1870s when Top Dam was damaged, and that a 1,000-ounce (28 kg) plate of silver was washed away and never recovered, but no evidence has been found in the company's records of damage to the smelt mill at that date.

The 1853 lease gave the company the right to extract water from Red Tarn and Keppelcove Tarn. In the late 1860s both tarns were modified by building dams. A dam was built in 1868 to increase the capacity of Red Tarn and to regulate the beck supplying water to the Low Mill. In Keppel Cove a natural tarn had formed behind a glacial moraine across the floor of the valley. To draw on this water in times of low rainfall, a tunnel was made through the moraine and an 18-inch cast iron pipe laid through it to extract water from the bottom of the tarn. The top of the moraine was flattened and widened, and the work completed in 1871. Catchment of the tarn was increased by diverting two streams into it, include the one out of Brown Cove and at some point a dam was built to create a reservoir in Brown Cove. Its remains can still be seen, though the wall was cut down in 1936 when it was no longer needed.

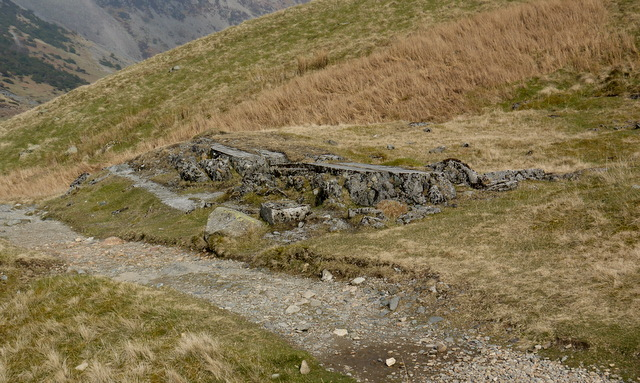
Foundations of Power Station No. 1 at Greenside Mine, beside the track to Red Tarn

The first hydroelectric power station was built in 1890 just below the confluence of Red Tarn Beck and Glenridding Beck. The water for this came from Keppelcove Tarn, along a leat on the lower slopes of Catstye Cam to a wooden penstock about 400 feet (120 m) above the power station. From there it was piped down to a water turbine driving a dynamo which produced a 600 volt DC supply. Copper cables took this to the mine, through the Low Horse Level and down the Low Level Shaft to a switchroom in Warsop's Crosscut. As the mine deepened, power demands increased. In 1899 a second turbine and a 500 volt dynamo was installed in the power station. The two power lines were kept separate, but the new one followed the same route into the mine, where it seems to have been used to power an air compressor. New equipment was put into the power station in 1911 to produce a 2,000 volt three–phase AC supply. A transformer in Warsop's Crosscut converted this to 350 volts for use in the mine, and to the 550 volt DC supply needed for the existing motors.

A second power station was built in the early 1920s, using water from a small concrete dam on the Swart Beck. This produced a 2,200 volt AC supply which was taken into the mine along the Lucy Tongue Level and used to drive a new air compressor in Warsop's Crosscut, as well as a 250 volt DC supply used for the Lucy loco and the mill lights.

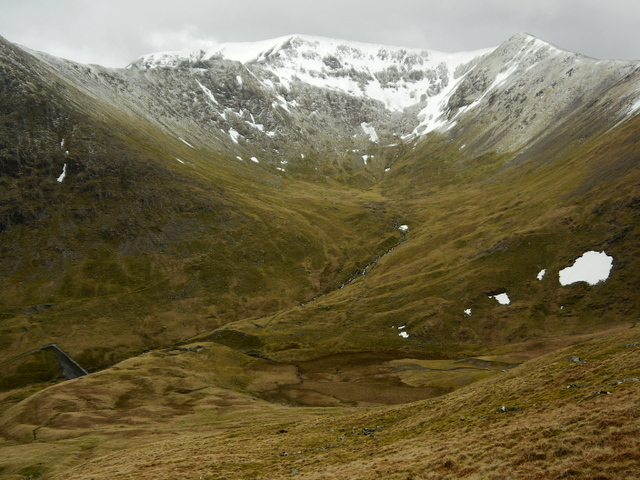
Keppel Cove (lower right), with the breach in the wall of moraine, and the concrete dam of 1928, both visible to the left. Brown Cove is seen further up the main valley, beneath a snow-covered Helvellyn.

The dam in Keppel Cove was destroyed by a storm on 29 October 1927. After a day of heavy rain, winds increased to 90 miles per hour (140 km/h) overnight and at 1.30 am the dam gave way, emptying the tarn and sending a large flood down Glenridding Beck, through the village and into the lake. Houses were flooded and families had some narrow escapes, while the mine was left without sufficient power. The old dam was abandoned and a new concrete dam was built downstream from it in 1928. Yet the new dam also failed, on 20 August 1931. Its foundations were undermined after two days of heavy rain, and all the water escaped down the beck again. It was abandoned and the old Top Dam was raised to increase water storage for the mill.

Meanwhile, a third power station had been built near Rattlebeck Bridge, just above Glenridding village, using water led along a leat from near the mine offices. This had a new turbine and alternator which produced a 2,200 volt three-phase AC power supply, and gave a greater generating capacity than the two earlier power stations combined.

When the Basinghall Mining Syndicate took over the mine in 1936 they immediately began to cut down the dam walls at Red Tarn and in Brown Cove to make them safe, and so that they were no longer subject to legislation on dams, and a stone spillway was built beside Top Dam to provide a safe overflow channel. They also decided that a reliable mains electricity supply was needed at the mine. A power line to Glenridding was installed during the winter of 1937/38. Two of the mine's power stations were refurbished so that they could supply some of the mine's requirements (up to 80% in wet weather.)

== Employment issues ==
Mining work at Greenside (that is, driving levels, sumps and rises, and winning ore from the stopes) was done during the nineteenth century by groups of miners who formed partnerships and worked as independent contractors. Contracts (known as "bargains") for particular jobs were let once a quarter to the group bidding the lowest rate per fathom, and were paid at the end of the quarter according to the amount of work that had been done. Interim payments of £2 per man (called "lent money") were made at the end of the first and second months. These were then deducted, along with the costs of candles, gunpowder and the sharpening of tools, from the payment at the end of the quarter. On average each miner earned 16 to 18 shillings per week under this system. (Note: Average annual nominal earnings in 1835 were £32.12. 18 shillings per week equates to £46.80 per year, well above the national average, although its purchasing power was equivalent to £72.70 at 2011 values using the Retail Price Index.) Until 1837 the quarterly payments were made at the Angel Inn in Penrith. The whole workforce travelled into the town, and £1,600 might be paid out in cash.

Ore processing was the work of independent Washing Masters, who took a bargain for a year or more to carry out a particular job, and were paid a price per ton of lead smelted. They then hired boys and young men to do the work. This system lasted until 1855, when the last of the washing contracts were made. After that the company took control of the operation and paid weekly wages to the washers. Contracts continued for smelting as well as carting and smith work.

Many of the men and boys who worked at the mine came from outside Patterdale, and lodged for the week either with local families or at Lodging Shops built at the mine. These were simple two-storey buildings with a fireplace (for cooking and drying), tables and benches on the ground floor, and rows of double beds stacked two high on the first floor. The miners were responsible for keeping them clean, but with no floor, and no windows or ventilation upstairs, conditions in them could be very unpleasant, especially in cold wet weather or hot weather. One was built by 1832 and two more by 1839. A large one built in 1859 included a reading room so that the washer boys could be given some education by the miners themselves.

The men left home early on Monday morning, to arrive for a 10 o'clock start, bringing their food for the week, and returning home on Friday afternoon. The washers worked until midday on Saturday. Well-graded paths on both sides of Glencoyne remain as evidence of the routes taken by the men each week. The one around the top of the valley led from Dockray and Matterdale and is still known as the Miners' Balcony Path. The miners usually worked a single 8–hour shift, though there was no timekeeping. The men driving the Lucy Tongue Level worked three shifts (known as "cores") so that work could continue round the clock.

Health problems in miners were the result of working in poor air, filled with dust from blasting, and from dampness. Although the miners lived nearly as long as the rest of the local population, they aged more quickly. The worst affected at Greenside were those who had come from the poorly ventilated mines on Alston Moor. The smelters suffered lead poisoning from inhaling lead fumes at the furnaces. The miners ran their own insurance scheme, paying a shilling a quarter to either the Oddfellows Lodge (founded June 1839) or the Mechanics Lodge (founded 1869). By the 1930s these were paying 12 shillings a week to men unable to work through sickness or accident.

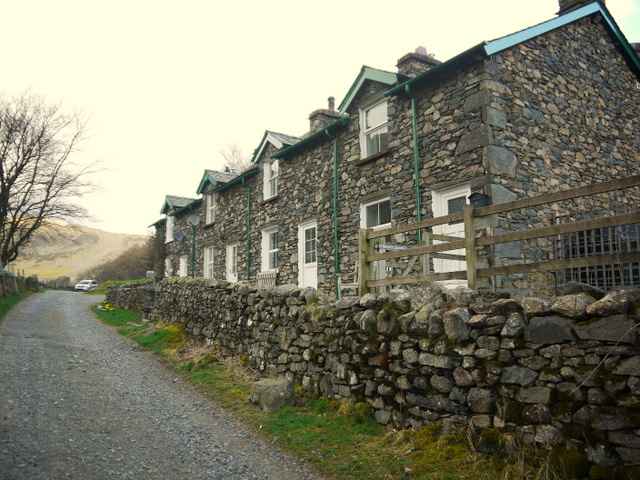
Row of four miners' cottages at Rake Head, built in the 1860s beside the road to the mine.

A row of ten cottages for married miners was built at Seldom Seen in Glencoyne, beside the track from Penrith, about 1839; these houses still exist, now used as holiday cottages. More cottages were built in Glenridding over the years: two rows of four at Low Glenridding in 1858, twelve more at Rake Head in the 1860s and more at High Rake in 1879 and 1881. Twelve cottages known as Stybarrow Terrace were built in the village in 1890, and Halton Terrace in 1892. Larger houses were built or bought for the mine foreman and the mine agent. By 1925 the company owned 52 houses. There were frequent complaints about the state of the privies; only in the 1950s were the cottages finally supplied with running water and WCs were installed.

By the 1880s there was a management team whose salaries were paid quarterly. The chief agent earned £200 per annum, (Note: £200 in 1880 represents nearly four times the average annual nominal earnings that year (which were £55.89). Its purchasing power was equivalent to £16,300 at 2011 values using the Retail Price Index.) two assistant agents £115 and £100, the foreman (or timekeeper) £75 and the office clerk £37/10/0d. Mining work was still carried out under the bargain system but payments were made every four (or five) weeks. Men employed on the mine transport (filling wagons, driving horses, working at the shafts) as well as timbermen, blacksmiths and surface workers were paid wages at weekly rates.

In the 1870s men were attracted away from Greenside by higher wages being paid in coal and iron mines. Average pay increased from 17 shillings to 21 shillings in 1873. (Note: 21 shillings in 1873 had a purchasing power of £76.30 at 2011 values.) The same problem saw the loss of a fifth of the men in 1899, in spite of a 10–15% pay rise the year before.

In the 1940s three 8-hour shifts were worked each day for six days a week. The miners worked on "group piece work." Each group was paid fortnightly according to the amount of work done, measured in cubic fathoms in the stopes, or in feet for driving levels or sinking winzes. The cost of explosives used, and of carbide supplied for lamps, was deducted from the payments made. Surface workers in the mill were paid weekly wages. Poor labour relations at the time led to an unofficial strike in 1942; the men on weekly rates eventually received an increase of 2 shillings per day following a similar settlement in the West Cumberland iron mines.

== Operation Orpheus ==
In 1959, when the Greenside Mine was about to close, it was used as the site of an experiment to test the seismic detection of large underground explosions.

The Partial Nuclear Test Ban Treaty of 1963 was the result of eight years of negotiations, following a proposal for a ban on nuclear tests made by the Soviet Union in 1955. The biggest obstacle to a treaty was the issue of verifying that all parties complied with it, and the Western powers were determined that any agreement reached could not be violated in a clandestine manner. One of the issues at stake was the possibility of disguising explosions in large underground chambers by decoupling the explosive from the rock. This idea was developed by Dr Albert Latter in 1959. With negotiations underway, some small-scale tests were made immediately to determine whether decoupling could work to disguise the size of an underground explosion. After an initial pair of small explosions in clay, a larger programme of testing was undertaken, first in the Excelsior Tunnel beneath Kit Hill in Cornwall, followed by larger explosions at a salt mine in Louisiana in the US, and finally two explosions in solid andesite rock at Greenside Mine. The UK part of this programme was called Operation Orpheus

The first explosion at Greenside involved the detonation of 3,010 pounds (1.37 tonnes) of TNT placed on a wooden frame in the centre of an ellipsoidal chamber 25 feet (7.6 m) long and 16 feet (4.9 m) in diameter. This was the decoupled charge. It was detonated at 22:30 on 19 December 1959, and the seismic signals were detected at six locations up to 47.5 miles (76.4 km) away. The second explosion, of 1,160 pounds (0.53 tonnes) of TNT packed into a small chamber 5 feet (1.5 m) long and 2 feet (0.61 m) in diameter, should have followed 30 minutes later. This was the smaller, coupled charge, in order to compare its seismic effects with the larger decoupled one. However the first explosion destroyed the cables and control equipment needed to detonate the second charge. The second test was further delayed by a mining accident, and eventually took place at 19:00 on 29 April 1960. But the tests were conclusive. The smaller charge gave rise to a larger seismic signal and showed that the effect of the decoupled charge was attenuated by a factor of between 10 and 30.

Control of Greenside Mine for the tests was taken over by the United Kingdom Atomic Energy Authority at the end of November 1959. The tests were conducted by the Atomic Weapons Research Establishment (AWRE), but the Greenside company was contracted to carry out mining operations. Access to the mine was controlled by the police. The two explosion chambers were excavated in the 175 Fathom Level, where it had been extended south of the Clay Vein and a long crosscut had been driven in an attempt to find an extension of the Greenside Vein. This site was in solid rock, well away from the fractured and mineralised vein, and 1,700 feet (520 m) below ground level. Two drives at right angles to the crosscut were planned to lead to the chambers. The first of these was abandoned under political pressure for a quick result, and the large chamber was excavated directly at the end of the existing crosscut. Once the TNT had been placed in the two chambers they had to be sealed off with heavy stemming. Sealing the large crosscut was difficult, and there was no time to construct a large concrete plug. Sandbags filled with tailings from the mine dam were used, interspersed with air gaps and timber walls. The area was also sealed off by two brick walls so that the poisonous gases produced by the explosions could be contained and pumped out. All personnel were cleared from the mine and the explosions were detonated from the surface.

After the first explosion on 19 December, re-entry to the mine was carried out by mine rescue teams wearing breathing apparatus, until it was established that it was safe for the AWRE men to return. They found that the stemming in the crosscut had failed to contain the blast, which had destroyed the cables and control equipment for the second charge. This was repaired and the second explosion scheduled for 15 January 1960. The evening before it was due, a group of Greenside men were finishing off some sandbagging. Two of these, who were not experienced underground workers, went off during their mid-evening break to visit a stope at the northern end of the mine, to collect pieces of white spar. They failed to return, and were found dead, overcome by gases that had lingered in the stope. The test was halted while more work was done to improve the extraction of gas from the explosion. The second test finally took place on 29 April 1960. Venting the mine and checking for gases was carried out very thoroughly this time, and it was August 1960 before control of the mine was returned to the Greenside company.

Underground nuclear tests were eventually excluded from the Partial Nuclear Test Ban Treaty of 1963.

== Closure, and after ==
Between August 1960 and April 1961 the last of the ore was brought out of Greenside Mine, from what was left in the stopes and from pillars and manways that were then left to collapse. 51 men and 4 staff produced the last 718 long tons (730 tonnes) of lead concentrates. About half the men were then dismissed; the other half were kept on to remove whatever equipment could be sold. Rails and pipework were removed from the working levels, and after the pumps were removed the water level slowly rose. The mill was demolished; pipes, aqueducts and power lines were removed from the surrounding hillsides. The openings of the mine were sealed. The mouth of the Glencoyne Level was walled up. The entrance to the Low Horse Level was blocked. Lucy's adit was partially blocked up using a concrete seal, although there remains evidence of adit discharge.

More men were made redundant when this work had been completed in mid-December 1961. The remainder covered the spoil heaps with organic material to encourage vegetation, and demolished the old stone-walled buildings of the Smelt Mill, the Silver Refinery and the Smith's Shop. A miners' hostel was converted into a Youth Hostel. Workmen living in the many houses were helped to buy them at reduced prices. Then, on 31 January 1962 the last twelve men were paid their final wages, and the office keys were handed over to the landowners' solicitors. There had been over 100 pupils at the school in Patterdale in the 1950s; after the mine closed the school roll fell to less than 20 children. Many of the houses have become holiday homes now.

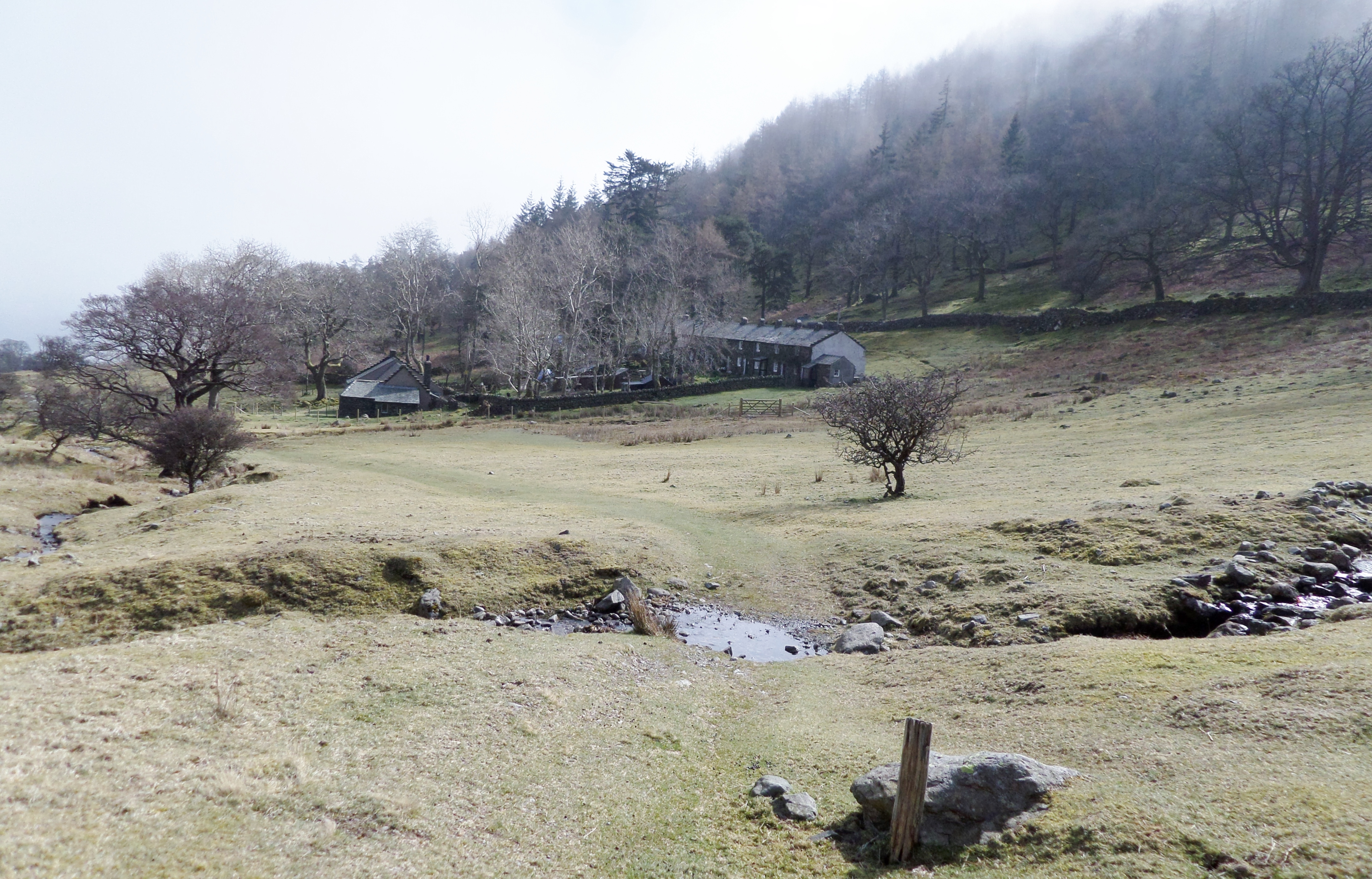
The old miners' school and cottages of Seldom Seen in Glencoynedale have become private housing.

Mine explorers, many with an interest in Lake District mining history, first entered the mine through the Glencoyne Level in 1977. They were able to make their way down to the Lucy Tongue Level using the long ladders of the old escape route. There had been a number of large roof-falls. One had blocked the north end of the Lucy Tongue Level, there was another at the junction with Warsop's Crosscut (although a way could be made round it), and deep water was found at the south end of the level, indicating another blockage further on. Some fine photographs were taken of the old workings in 1978. Attempts to enter other levels were made in 1987. The entrance to the High Horse Level was cleared, but it was found to be blocked by a collapse a few yards inside. The mouth of the Low Horse Level was also cleared, and this gave access as far as Marshall's Level and Johnston's Cross Vein, but further progress was blocked by more roof-falls. One potential danger to mine explorers was the fall of a large piece of rock in one of the shafts leading down to the Lucy Tongue Level in the late 1980s. They made this secure by bolting an RSJ girder across the shaft and fastening the rock to it with steel cables. To get the girder into place it had to be hauled up to the Glencoyne Level and through the workings to the shaft.

The reopening of the Lucy Tongue Level was agreed to in 1993 by the present owners of the mine, the Lake District Special Planning Board (LDSPB), part of the National Park Authority. Groups of enthusiasts collaborated to dig through the roof of the level from above the original entrance, and installed a large concrete pipe with a lockable manhole cover. They were able to follow the level as far as "Low Arches," where it turned west into the Clay Vein. This soft vein had always been bad ground which needed supporting and roofing, and parts of it had collapsed. By 1996 the level had been cleared for 100 yards (91 m) through this area. Eventually it was cleared right through, with the debris being bagged up and stacked along the side of the level. In 2003 there was another major collapse in the Lucy Tongue Level, just south of Smith's Shaft. This involved another major operation to clear it and install steel supports. Explorers can now pass right through the mine, in at the Glencoyne Level and out from the Lucy Tongue Level.

Much of the site was designated as a scheduled ancient monument in 1979. A survey of the surface remains was conducted by the Royal Commission on the Historical Monuments of England in 1991–94.

The spoil heaps continue to be of concern. A collapse of part of the one to the west of Swart Beck, above the old Low Mill site, in 2002 resulted in a £750,000 engineering project to stabilise the area. Work was carried out throughout 2002 by Preston-based Civil Engineering contractor, Eric Wright Civil Engineering Limited, including the installation of coir rolls and pre-cast concrete drainage channels, as well as the placing of rock armour to the adjacent beck, with funding provided by Lake District National Park Authority and the Environment Agency. A further detailed topographical survey of the three spoil heaps was undertaken in July 2014, in advance of further engineering works to maintain their stability. Also in 2014 Eden District Council began a twelve-month environmental investigation of the site involving testing the metal content of soil, grass and water samples.

== Sources ==
- "Achievements in recent years". Cumbria Amenity Trust Mining History Society. Archived from the original on 3 February 2015.
- Adams, John (1995). Mines of the Lake District Fells. Skipton: Dalesman. ISBN 0852069316.
- "Assessment of Greenside Mine". Eden District Council. 2014. Archived from the original on 3 February 2015.
- "1:50,000 Geological Maps" (Map). Sheet E029, Keswick (Solid). British Geological Survey (BGS). 1999. ISBN 0751832294.
- Clarke, James (1787). A survey of the lakes of Cumberland, Westmorland, and Lancashire. Penrith, Cumberland and London., quoted by Murphy 1996, p. 2
- "COMRU Through Trip, Greenside Mine (18/10/09)". Mine Explorer. 2009.
- Connor, Cyril (1951a). "Greenside Mine – Mining and Milling Practice – Part 1". Mine & Quarry Engineering (November 1951).
- Connor, Cyril (1951b). "Greenside Mine – Mining and Milling Practice – Part 2". Mine & Quarry Engineering (December 1951).
- Connor, Cyril (1955). "Greenside Mine". Mine & Quarry Engineering (June 1955).
- "Five Ways to Compute the Relative Value of a UK Pound Amount, 1270 to Present". Measuring Worth. 2015.
- Gough, David (1965). "Structural Analysis of Ore Shoots at Greeenside Lead Mine, Cumberland, England" (PDF). Economic Geology. 60 (7): 1463. doi:10.2113/gsecongeo.60.7.1459.
- Green, William (1819). The Tourist's New Guide: Containing a Description of the Lakes, Mountains, and Scenery, in Cumberland, Westmorland, and Lancashire. Kendal., quoted by Murphy 1996, p. 8
- "Greenside Archive Album". AditNow.
- "Greenside Lead Mines". Pastscape. English Heritage. 2007.
- Hall, Andy (2013). "Greenside Mine, 15th June 2013". Red Rose Cave & Pothole Club.
- Jackson, Norman (June 2013). "The Greenside Lead Mine Disaster". Patterdale Today.
- Leith, William (January 2001). "Geologic and Engineering Constraints on the Feasibility of Clandestine Nuclear Testing by Decoupling in Large Underground Cavities" (PDF). U. S. Geological Survey. Archived from the original (PDF) on 17 February 2013.
- Murphy, Samuel (1996). Grey Gold. Tanworth-in-Arden, Warwickshire: Moiety. ISBN 0952636077.
- Ordnance Survey (1861), Map of Westmorland at a scale of 1:2,500.
- "Operation Orpheus". Patterdale Today. 2008.
- "Operation Orpheus". Subterranea Britannica. 2004.
- Postlethwaite, John (1913). Mines and Mining in the English Lake District. Whitehaven: W. H. Moss & Sons Ltd.
- Richards, Mark (2008). Lakeland Fellranger: The Near Eastern Fells. Milnthorpe, Cumbria: Cicerone. ISBN 9781852845414.
- Schofield, Peter (2014). "Helicopter UAV and Agisoft used to survey spoil tips at Greenside Lead Mines". Upland Pete.
- Shaw, W. T. (1975) [1970]. Mining in the Lake Counties (3rd ed.). Clapham, near Lancaster: Dalesman. ISBN 0852062710.
- Stone, P.; et al. (2010). British Regional Geology: Northern England. Nottingham: British Geological Survey. ISBN 978-0852726525.
- "The RSJ Haul". AditNow.
- This is Cornwall (20 January 2009). "Cold War secrets beneath a Cornish hill". West Briton.
- U. S. State Department (2004). "Treaty Banning Nuclear Weapon Tests in the Atmosphere, in Outer Space and Under Water". U. S. Department of State.
- "£750,000 safety work project starts at Greenside mine". Cumberland & Westmorland Herald. 18 May 2002.
