= Mine exploration =

Hobby of visiting abandoned mines

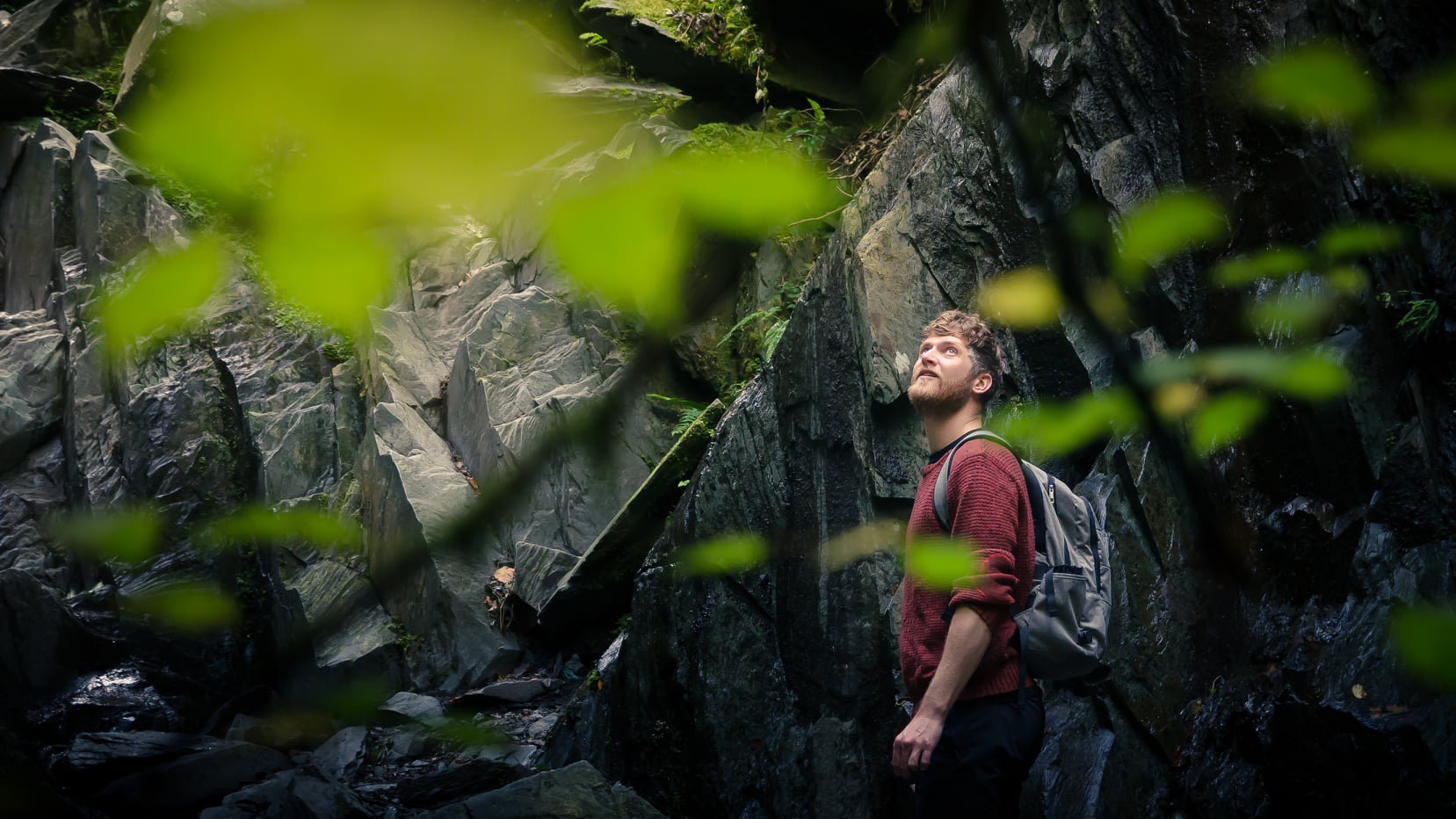
A person exploring a disused mine in Cumbria, England

Mine exploration is a hobby in which people visit abandoned mines, quarries, and sometimes operational mines. Enthusiasts usually engage in such activities for the purpose of exploration and documentation, sometimes through the use of surveying and photography. In this respect, mine exploration might be considered a type of amateur industrial archaeology. In many ways, however, it is closer to caving, with many participants actively interested in exploring both mines and caves. Mine exploration typically requires equipment such as helmets, head lamps, Wellington boots, and climbing gear.

Mine exploration typically involves less crawling and more walking than caving, since mines were purposefully excavated to allow human access. Some disused mines have been adapted for tourism, or use by organized outdoor recreation groups. Conversely, gaining access to other mines may require technical skills such as rappelling or single rope technique. Such techniques may also be used inside a mine to explore a winze, shaft, or steep incline. Similarly, some traverses and slopes may be roped for safety, particularly if organized groups are taken into the mine.

Mine exploration shares some interests with Urban Exploration, primarily that of gaining access to abandoned or sometimes restricted locations. Mine explorers share an unspoken code of ethics, that of leaving sites in the same condition as they were found. A common phrase illustrating this viewpoint is the Baltimore Grotto caving society's motto: "take nothing but pictures, leave nothing but footprints." This is similar to the Leave No Trace ethos followed in much of modern outdoor recreation.

== Rationale ==
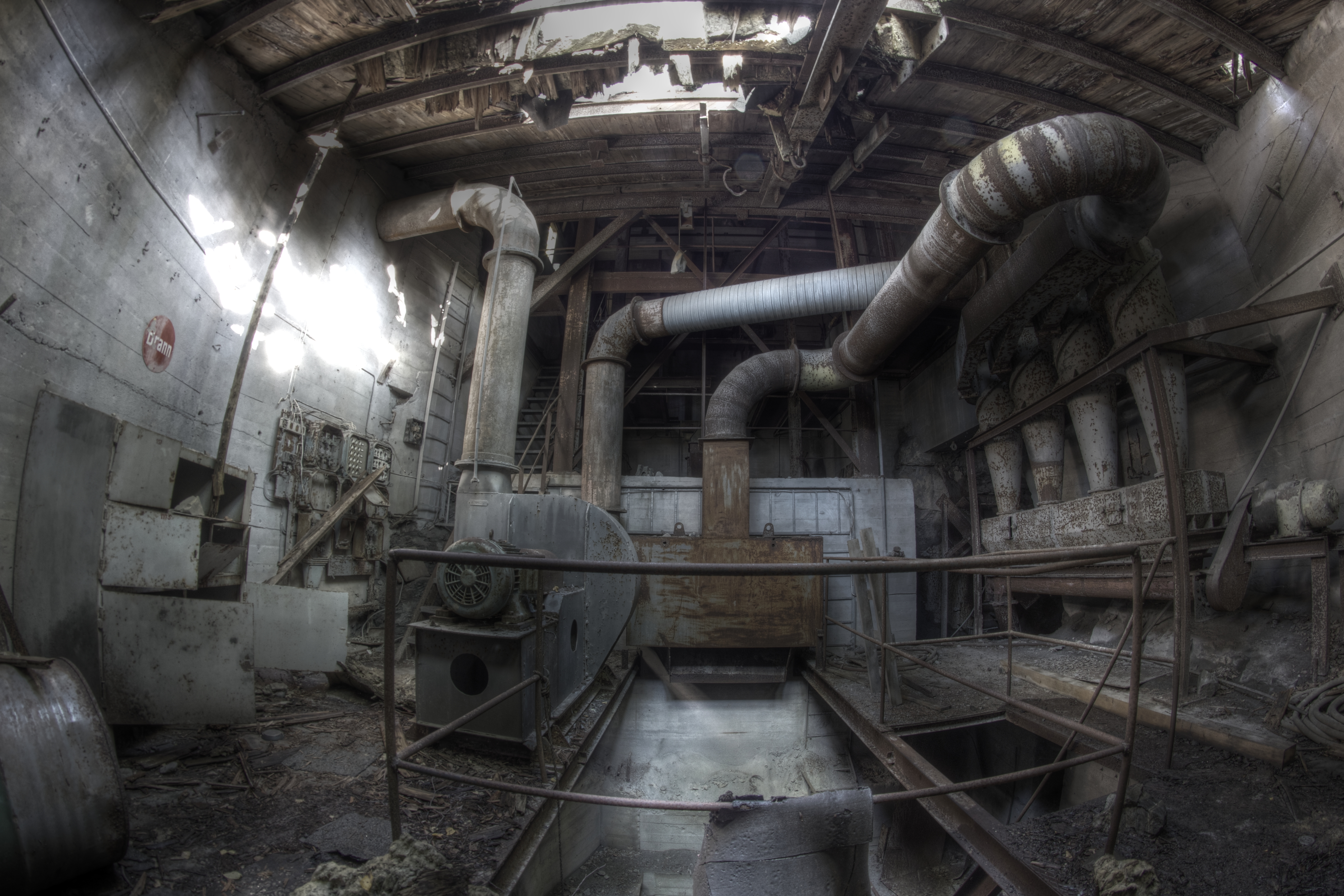
Pump room of an abandoned mine

Like many hobbies or sports, mine exploration appeals to a specific subset of people. An interest in industrial archaeology may be a motivating factor for some enthusiasts. Relics and artifacts found in abandoned mine workings may include equipment such as pumps, cranes, drills, narrow gauge railway tracks, wagons and locomotives. Abandoned mines may occasionally contain larger features such as timber bridges, cable railways, or waterwheels.

Photography is often a significant component of enthusiasts' motivation for exploration. Underground photography requires specialized techniques such as light painting or an 'open flash.' Such techniques may require considerable practice for mastery.

== Access ==
There are many abandoned mines in the world – for example, it is estimated that there are approximately 500,000 abandoned mines in the United States alone, with Nevada having the largest percentage of this number. However, access to many of these is not possible for a variety of reasons, including:

- Restricted Access: Legal access to explore mines is not always possible, even though it may be physically possible to get in. The sites of old mines are often taken over by the public bodies such as the Forestry Commission, National Trust or by private land owners who consider the liability risks of access to be sufficient to justify blocking off access permanently, a common approach being to bulldoze the adits and cap any shafts. In other instances, entrances may be gated in order to restrict access to those approved by the landowner.
- Re-use: The sites of old mines are sometimes taken over for new uses such as data storage or mushroom cultivation, or re-mining: the owner will rarely permit public access.
- Collapse: As workings age, the roofs of passageways and chambers can fail. In doing so, the collapsed area itself is no longer accessible and any workings beyond that point will become inaccessible if there remains no other way around. There are many mines that have suffered a small collapse right at the entrance (often the most vulnerable part) sealing off significant sized workings beyond.
- Flooding: Almost all working mines require pumps to remove water, with the exception of those being self-draining via deep drainage adits. Once a mine is abandoned, the pumps are usually turned off and the mine slowly fills with water until a level is reached where water can drain out: this is usually the lowest adit. However, it is possible to find flooded sections in mines which are above a dry adit as workings are often very complex: in some cases reservoirs may have been created in higher chambers to provide power for machinery below.
- Technical Limitations: Some mines are easy 'walkabouts', while others require expertise, skill and equipment to explore; for example single-rope techniques (SRT) may be needed to gain access via a vertical shaft.

== Potential dangers ==
Mine exploration is considered a dangerous activity by many. In the United States, the Mine Safety and Health Administration (MSHA) has run an annual "Stay Out-Stay Alive" national public safety campaign to warn children about the dangers of exploring and playing on mine property. They claim that since 1999, nearly 150 children and adults have died in recreational accidents at active and abandoned mine and quarry sites, although the majority of these were not related to mine exploration.

Many accidents by inexperienced curiosity-seekers cause reactions by government agencies to close mines. In most cases, a mine entrance will be fenced and warning signs erected, but the BLM, NPS and other organizations are increasingly resorting to bulldozing, plugging or gating mine entrances, denying everyone access. Most mine closures of this nature are done in areas near large population centers and parks that receive a large number of visitors, such as Death Valley.

Common features in a mine include drifts (horizontal tunnels), shafts (vertical tunnels) and winzes or air vents that are much smaller and can be at any angle underground. Climbing through these shafts, tunnels, and winzes can be very dangerous due to their unseen entrances and exits. A drift with a portal to the outside is called an adit.

Stopes (areas where ore was removed) usually follow the ore vein and are often at steep angles to horizontal. Many stopes are shored with wooden 2x4s or 4x4s. Contrary to what one might think, the wood isn't there to keep the stope from collapsing, but rather to hold loose rock in place. Some stopes are narrow and convoluted (explorers like to call them "spider holes"); others resemble giant rooms. Many stopes have a lot of loose material on or around them.

Raises are often used to transit vertically between levels of a mine. A raise is often a 6–12 foot square vertical shaft divided into two sections. One half is a straight drop to the bottom and is used for haulage, and the other section is a series of platforms, 10 or more feet apart, with holes cut in them in an alternating manner. Beneath each hole is a ladder leading to the next platform. This style of construction affords safety: if one falls off the ladder, the fall is only to the next platform, not the bottom of the shaft.

Mines were generally constructed and maintained to be safe while they were operational. After they are abandoned, workings may decay to a point where they could become dangerous. For instance, some support structures may have been removed before abandonment for re-use elsewhere, or supporting pillars may have been quarried away, leaving the chambering unstable. Ventilation and water pumping systems that once maintained safe working conditions are removed.

There are a number of potential hazards that mine explorers face:

- Surface shafts: the ground around abandoned mine shafts and open pits may be weak and could cave-in without warning. Undergrowth may hide shafts, while timber used for capping may have rotted to a point where it will collapse if weight is put on it. Even scarier is the so-called "ant-lion trap" effect: loose earth around a surface shaft crumbles away over time, leaving a funnel-shaped drop-off around the shaft. If a curious person attempts to look down the shaft, he or she could begin sliding into it with nothing to stop the fall.
- Collapses: the effects of blasting, weathering, and earthquakes destabilize once-strong bedrock through time. Portals (adits) in particular are affected, but tunnel and chamber roofs and walls can also destabilize. Support timber props, ladders and other similar structures may appear safe but could have degraded. Similarly, waste rock tipped down chambers may be unstable and rockslides may occur if they are walked on.
- Darkness: As with most underground places, the darkness in a mine is total. If you lose light, it may be difficult or impossible to exit the mine. An experienced explorer will carry at least three independent sources of illumination and a set of spare batteries.
- Falling down vertical openings is the most common cause of death and injury in abandoned mines. Winzes are vertical or inclined shafts sunk from a tunnel and these can be hidden by darkness, water, loose debris or false floors. False floors may also be present in substantial lengths of tunnel, where the floor level has been worked (understopped). Such floors may be supported by rotten wood, but surfaced with rock and not clearly distinguishable from a solid floor.
- Water: Water in mines is often deep and can be dangerously cold; if it fills an area with steep sides, then it may not be easy to climb out. Seemingly shallow water can conceal sharp objects, drop-offs, and other hazards. Furthermore, a wet mine can rot or rust timbers, shoring and ladders, making conditions hazardous. Desert mines tend to be dry and therefore relatively safe in this regard; however, dry rot can weaken wood. All ladders and wooden floors should be tested before trusting body weight to them.
- Bad air: Old mine workings may be hazardous due to pockets of blackdamp (still air with low oxygen levels), or high concentrations of methane, carbon monoxide, carbon dioxide or hydrogen sulfide which can displace oxygen, poison someone outright, or create an explosion. Coal mines are especially prone to containing these gases. The mines of the Comstock Lode Nevada are also very prone to this.
- Explosives such as dynamite, black powder or blasting caps may have been abandoned in old mines. Many explosives become increasingly unstable with age and could be detonated by the slightest movement or even the vibrations from a footfall.
- Wildlife: Snakes, various mammals, and bats can call a mine home.
- Hazardous chemicals: Mines dug in wet areas give underground water a path to percolate through rock and exit via the tunnel systems. In some areas, the mine water can contain various types of heavy metals. Bacterial action can create acids and other compounds that are hazardous to humans. Acid mine drainage is of great concern in some areas. Also, mills and other processing areas may contain traces of cyanide and mercury compounds that were once used to separate precious metals from the ore.
- Remoteness: Most mines are a long way from medical assistance, and depending on the circumstances, just getting to the surface could be an ordeal if one is injured.

== Locations ==
=== Belgium ===
The last active underground mine in Belgium was the Zolder coal mine, closed in 1992. The largest underground mines in Belgium are coal and slate mines.

- The Kempen in the Limburg province, with some of the largest coal mines in the country: Beringen, Zolder, Genk, and Maasmechelen
- Liège Province: Hoei, Seraing, Liege, and Herve
- Namur Province: Andenne, Namur, Sambreville
- "The Black Country", coal mining region around Charleroi, Farciennes, and Marcinelle. The Bois du Cazier mine there was the site of one of the worst mining disasters in Belgian mining history.
- Henegouwen: area around Anderlues, La Louvière, Ressaix and Trivières
- The Borinage: coal mines around Frameries, Dour, Hornu, Boussu, Hensies, and Bernissart. The Borinage mines are famous to palaeontologists for their fossils, such as the Iguanodons of Bernissart.

=== Canada ===
Some examples of mines frequented by explorers includes:

- British Columbia – There are hundreds of explored and unexplored mines in British Columbia.
- Monarch/Kicking Horse Mine: Field BC
- Mineral King: Panoroama BC
- Remac: West Kootenays, BC

=== Russia ===
- Moscow oblast and adjacent regions – tens of 19th-century limestone quarries.
- Samara region – 20th century limestone quarries.
- Leningradskaya oblast – sandstone quarries.

=== United Kingdom ===
Britain's man-made underground world is extensive. Some abandoned mines range as deep as 1.1 km. Some of the more extensive tunnel systems span mountain ranges or extend underneath populous cities.

Some typical mine exploration locations and type of mines are:

- Bath stone – Corsham, Combe Down.
- Slate mines – North Wales, The Lake District.
- Lead Mines – Nenthead, Cumbria, The Lake District and Derbyshire.
- Tin Mines – Devon, Cornwall, Geevor Tin Mine
- Iron ore — Mines and natural caves mined for ore in the Forest of Dean
- Coal Mines – Drift Mines in the South Wales Coalfield

=== United States ===
There are approximately 500,000 mines within the United States. Listed below are regions containing a high number of both abandoned and operational mines:

- New York and New Jersey: The Highlands Region.
- Pennsylvania: The Coal Region.
- California: The Mojave Desert, Death Valley, and the surrounding areas.
- Nevada
- Arizona
- Utah: The Wasatch Range and Tintic Mountains
- Montana
- Colorado
- Alaska
- West Virginia

== See also ==
- Mining
- Speleology
- Mine rescue
