= Ore shoot =

Mineral mass in a shear or fault zone

An ore shoot is a hypogenic mass that is deposited in veins within a planar channel or lode, found in a shear or fault zone, fissure, or lithologic boundary. The ore shoot is the area of concentration which contains a primary ore along the veins present in the rock, and consists of the most valuable part of the deposit.

== Veins ==
Along an ore shoot, there is a rich gathering of different minerals within a vein. The veins can resemble a pipe, chimney or ribbon in structure and are displaced mainly vertically oriented but also can be horizontal with large veins extending approximately 30 m (100 ft) horizontally and 150 m (500 ft) vertically. The metal contents in ore shoots are distributed in areas that vary in deposit sizes. When several lodes meet, they connect to form vein systems, these systems contain common fluid sources which causes general homogeneity within the mineralization types and ore shoot controls resulting in the veins sharing a common plumbing system.

== Gold Vein ==
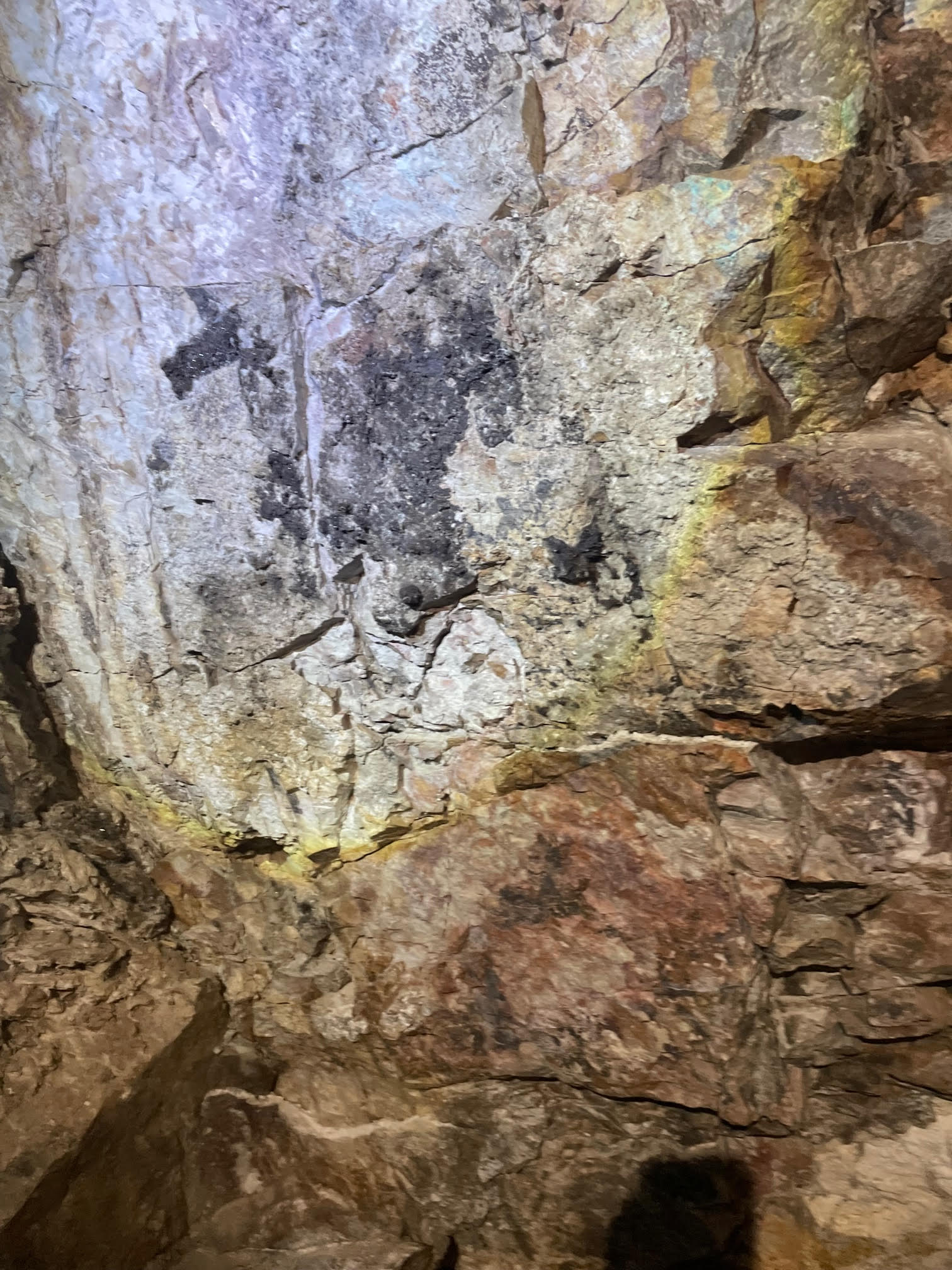
Gold Ore Vein Located in Good Enough Silver Mine in Tombstone, Arizona

In gold vein deposits, the ore shoots tend to be deposited in an elongated plunging direction. The majority of the time, the ore shoot plunge for orogenic gold deposits arises from the mineral deposition and direction of the fluid flow controlled by structures.

== Sizes and structure ==
The circumference of deposit sizes can range from a few meters to many kilometers. A structure may consist of multiple ore shoots with some veins or lodes being as thick as 1.5–6.1 m (5–20 ft), and extending to thousands of feet horizontally and vertically. The shoots tend to be thicker and richer in center areas rather than being distributed equally. The geometrical values of the ore shoot are expressed using the breadth, dip and strike lengths as well as the plunge lengths. The average mass for most ore shoots are between 1 x 10^6 and 2 x 10^4 tonnes.

== Formation ==
There are complex stratigraphic historical parameters required in understanding how ore shoots are formed. Rocks go through numerous ductile and brittle deformation events before they become mineralized. The different locations of ore shoots in Australia are determined by investigating the internal architecture of the rock pile. The longest shoots occur on the flanks of the basalt flows with the largest lateral extent. The geometry and internal structure of the basalt flows is important for predicting the likelihood and extent of the ore shoots. The catalytic effect of different geological events leading up to an ore shoot formation is called "ground preparation". Varying forms of ground preparation are; 1. sequential deformation which produces grain in the ore district. 2. severe faulting and jointing that enhances the permeability and surface area where the ore minerals can precipitate. 3. Interplay between the ore fluid deformation which produces an ore shoot.

== Location Example: Jianzhupo Deposit ==
Found in the Guangxi region in South China, the Jianzhupo Sb-Pb-Zn-Ag deposit has been explored and studied over decades, by using different parameters to understand the formation. These include the use of geological fluid inclusions as well as H-O isotopic data that can be found during the mineralization's main stage. The Jianzhupo deposit is located within the Danchi Sn-polymetalic belt, and experienced major faulting and subsidence during the Devonian-Carboniferous Periods following folding during the Middle Triassic, and then finally underwent extension during the Cretaceous. The deposit was drilled into for fluid inclusions samples at varying depths, recovering 30 thin sections that were then used for petrographic fluid inclusion analysis.
