= Winze =

Minor shaft between mine levels

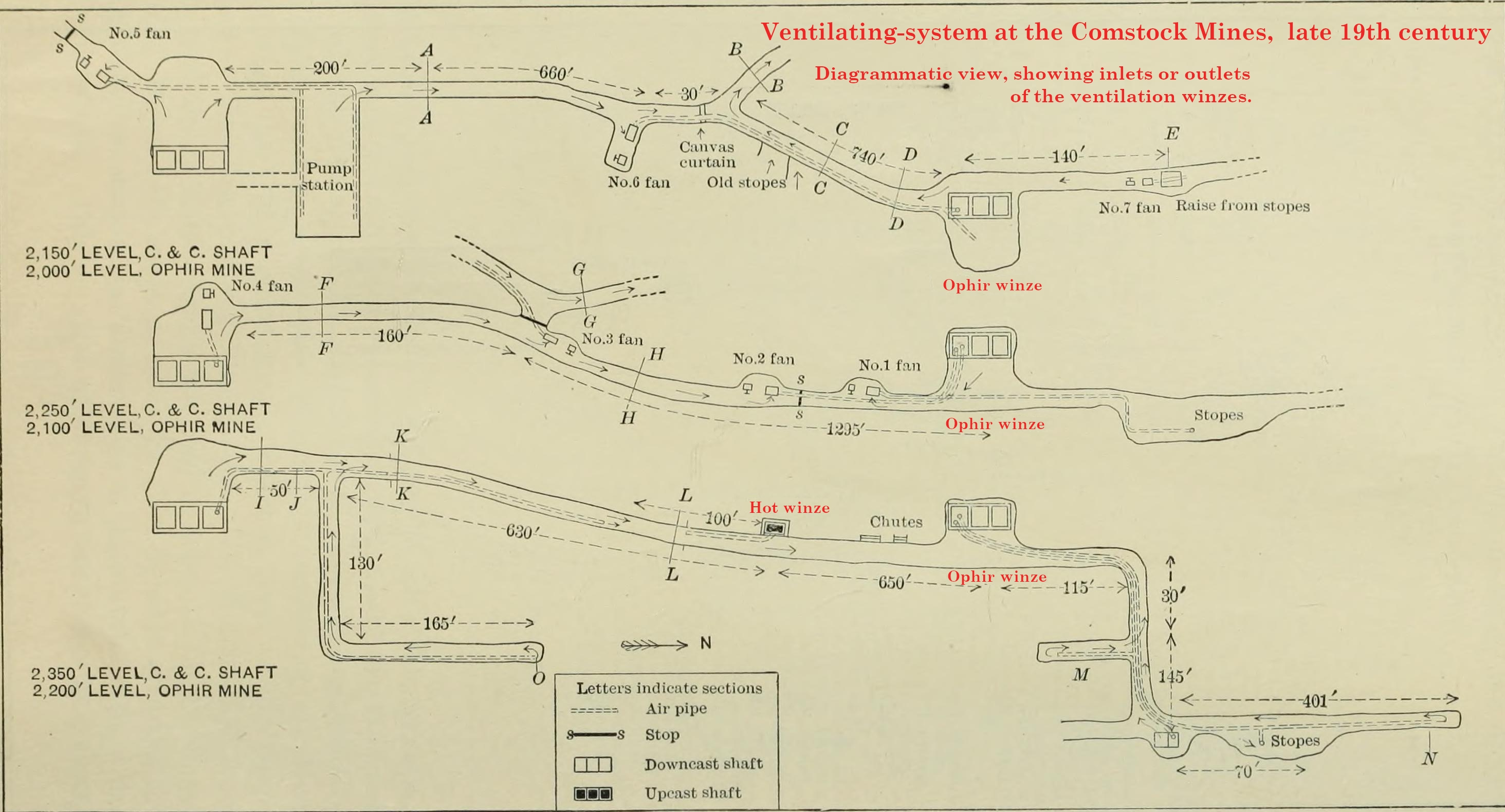
Late 19th-century map of winzes used for ventilation at the Comstock mines in Nevada

A winze is a minor connection between different levels in a mine. When worked upwards from a lower level it is usually called a raise; when sunk downward from a higher level it may be called a sump. The top of a winze is located underground and it is not equipped with winding gear. Rather, the access up and down between levels is usually via ladder. This is in contrast to a shaft, which is a deeper connection between levels and does have winding gear, whether the top of the excavation is located on the surface or underground.
