= Ennerdale Horseshoe Fell Race =

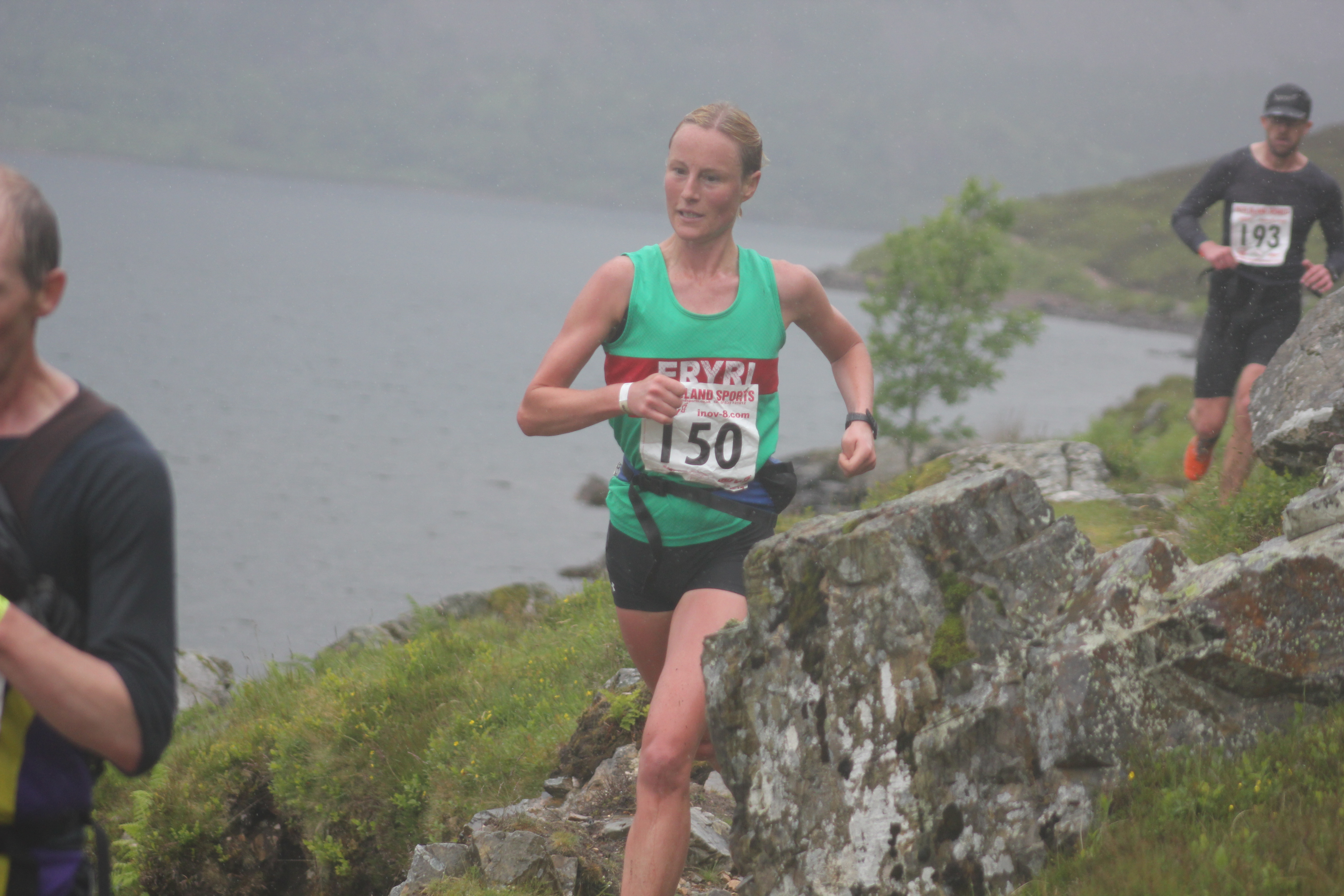
2014 Ennerdale Horseshoe Jackie Lee

The Ennerdale Horseshoe Fell Race is an annual Lake District fell race held in June, starting and finishing at the Scout Camp near Ennerdale Water. The route is approximately 36.8 kilometres (22.9 mi) in length with 2,290 metres (7,510 ft) of ascent and takes in checkpoints at Great Borne, Red Pike, Blackbeck Tarn, Green Gable, Kirk Fell, Pillar, Haycock, Iron Crag and Crag Fell.

== History ==
The race was started in 1968 by Joe Long and Frank Travis of the West Cumberland Orienteering Club and in 1970 was taken on by the newly formed Cumberland Fell Runners Association, whose committee included both Long and Travis. The first nine editions of the race were all won by Joss Naylor who has noted that it was one of his favourite courses.

A junior race was run in conjunction with Ennerdale in 1971. This followed the first part of the senior course over Great Borne and Red Pike before returning and was won by Dave Cannon. In the following years, the junior race was held on a route over Crag Fell and in 1977 a ladies’ race was introduced, also over the Crag Fell route.

Véronique Marot applied to run over the same course as the men in 1979 but was refused entry. She ran unofficially, to the consternation of the race organiser. The next year, women were allowed to compete over the full route.

In poor weather in the 1981 race, one of the competitors, Bob English, went off course on the way to the last checkpoint and fell badly. He was found unconscious with head injuries and died whilst being taken to hospital.

In the 1986 event, Billy Bland waited at the start until five minutes after everyone else had begun so that the other runners could not follow him and take advantage of his detailed route knowledge. Bland then ran through the field and was able to overtake everyone except Hugh Symonds.

The 2003 race was cancelled due to the small number of entries. Around that time, the event became part of the Lakeland Classics Trophy series of races and numbers recovered in subsequent years.

On some occasions, Ennerdale has been one of the counting races in the British and English Fell Running Championships, including in 2014 when a shorter lower-level course was used due to forecast lightning. The 2015 route was also shortened due to high winds and in 2022 the race was cancelled due to expected adverse weather.

== Results ==
The men's course record is held by Kenny Stuart with a time of 3:20:57 set in 1985. The fastest women's time is 4:01:33, set by Janet McIver in 2008.

The winners have been as follows.

Year	Men	Time	Women	Time
1968	Joss Naylor	4:00:00		
1969	Joss Naylor	4:08:25		
1970	Joss Naylor	3:53:20		
1971	Joss Naylor	3:35:40		
1972	Joss Naylor	3:30:40		
1973	Joss Naylor	3:33:00		
1974	Joss Naylor	3:32:42		
1975	Joss Naylor	3:30:55		
1976	Joss Naylor	3:46:08		
1977	Mike Short	3:41:11	Joan Glass	0:45:34^{[A]}
1978	Andy Styan	3:27:00	Jean Lochhead	0:42:39^{[A]}
1979	Andy Styan	3:23:44	Jean Lochhead	0:39:21^{[A]}
1980	Billy Bland	3:21:04	Pauline Haworth	4:37:47
1981	Billy Bland	3:50:59	Ros Coats	5:16:55
1982	Billy Bland	3:24:43	Sue Parkin	4:40:32
1983	Billy Bland	3:30:38	Linda Lord	5:29:57
1984	Kenny Stuart	3:32:59	Pauline Haworth	4:55:52
1985	Kenny Stuart	3:20:57	Pauline Haworth	4:27:52
1986	Hugh Symonds	3:38:59	Winky O’Neale	5:12:47
1987	Billy Bland	3:23:54	Vanessa Brindle	4:21:31
1988	Hugh Symonds	3:34:48	Sarah Haines	4:43:57
1989	Ian Ferguson	3:39:43	None	
1990	Colin Donnelly	3:31:16	Tricia Calder	4:06:41
1991	Ian Ferguson	3:36:35	Alison Wright	4:43:54
1992	Gavin Bland	3:37:51	Ruth Pickvance	4:43:35
1993	Gavin Bland	3:30:13	Ruth Pickvance	4:23:49
1994	Gavin Bland	3:46:23	Jean Shotter	5:55:06
1995	Jonny Bland	3:42:55	Kate Arnold	5:06:51
1996	Lee Thompson	4:00:36	Jan Cave	6:32:41
1997	Simon Booth	3:43:35	Emma Moody	5:12:46
1998	Lee Thompson	3:58:14	Nicky Lavery	5:23:32
1999	Andrew Davies	3:47:23	Jane Jones	5:27:09
2000	Simon Booth	3:21:24	Sally Newman	4:29:52
2001	Cancelled due to foot-and-mouth outbreak			
2002	Jonny Bland	4:03:00	Nicola Davies	5:41:53
2003	Cancelled due to low number of entries			
2004	Gavin Bland	3:48:17	Jackie Lee	4:59:12
2005	Andrew Schofield	3:48:03	Jackie Lee	4:41:06
2006	Simon Booth	3:37:52	Christine Howard	4:23:34
2007	Ricky Lightfoot	3:53:17	Jane Meeks	5:08:55
2008	Nick Sharp and Pete Vale	3:48:01	Janet McIver	4:01:33
2009	Rob Jebb	3:38:28	Jackie Lee	4:29:47
2010	Rob Jebb	3:34:06	Jackie Lee	4:23:43
2011	Simon Harding	4:04:08	Nicky Spinks	4:48:18
2012	Rhys Findlay-Robinson	3:50:40	Jasmin Paris	4:24:54
2013	Oli Johnson	3:46:39	Jasmin Paris	4:32:28
2014^{[B]}	Rob Hope	2:52:16	Jackie Lee	3:18:26
2015^{[B]}	Kieran Hodgson	2:09:48	Judith Jepson	2:35:12
2016	Ben Abdelnoor	4:03:27	Judith Jepson	4:58:54
2017	Ben Abdelnoor	4:08:35	Nicky Spinks	5:32:53^{[C]}
2018	Kim Collison	4:03:59	Jill Stephen	4:44:17
2019	Finlay Wild	3:52:36	Rosie Watson	4:57:59
2020	Cancelled due to the COVID-19 pandemic			
2021	Billy Cartwright	3:32:16	Nichola Jackson	4:13:59
2022	Cancelled due to forecast bad weather			
2023	Harry Bolton	4:22:05	Jodie Gray	5:35:53
2024	Hugh Chatfield	3:44:30	Antonia Fan	4:34:07
2025	Finlay Wild	3:32:27	Katie Mckay	5:09:37
2026	Tom Simpson	3:53:06	Harriet Wingfield	5:11:55

^{A} Crag Fell course.

^{B} Bad weather course.

^{C} The SPORTident results show Nicky Spinks one second ahead of Kirsty Hewitson but they were credited with a joint win in a time of 5:32:54 by race organiser Colin Dulson.
