= Wasdale Fell Race =

Running competition in Cumbria, England

The Wasdale Fell Race (sometimes known as the Wasdale Horseshoe) is an annual Lake District fell race held in July, starting and finishing at Brackenclose in Wasdale. The course is approximately twenty-one miles long with around 9,000 feet of ascent and takes in checkpoints at Whin Rigg, Seatallan, Pillar, Great Gable, Esk Hause shelter, Scafell Pike and Lingmell nose wall. The route between Pillar and Lingmell is very rough, with steep technical ground and boulder fields. Among long fell races, Wasdale has one of the highest ratios of feet of ascent per mile, and it is often considered to be the toughest of the British races.

== History ==
The race, organised by the Cumberland Fell Runners Association, was first held in 1972 when it took place during a heat wave. The descent from Scafell Pike that year was routed via Lingmell Col, Brown Tongue and Lingmell Gill, but from the following year, a new checkpoint at a wall crossing on Lingmell was included to give spectators a better view of the final descent. In 1978, the route across the valley from Whin Rigg to Seatallan was altered, slightly increasing the distance. A ladies’ race called the Burnmoor Chase was run in 1977 in conjunction with the Wasdale Race. This went from Brackenclose up onto Illgill Head, around Burnmoor Tarn and back down. This was also run in 1978 and 1979 but in 1980 there were insufficient entries and the women competed over the full men's course instead. In 1981, the ladies’ race followed the men's course to Pillar, from where it descended to the finish. From 1982 onwards, women competed over the same course as the men. There has also been a junior fell race held on the same day at Wasdale initially over a course up to Burnmoor Tarn and back (Burnmoor Chase) and later a short dash up to Lingmell Nose and down (one and a half miles with 1,000 feet of ascent).

In 2001, the trend of decreasing numbers of runners entering long category A fell races, including Wasdale, was discussed. The following year, Brian Martin and Selwyn Wright developed the Lakeland Classics Trophy series to raise the profile of the long Lakeland fell races, to encourage runners to compete in them and to recognise the achievements of runners who perform well in such events. Subsequent years saw the entry numbers recover.

The 2026 race was run over a shortened course of approximately sixteen miles due to hot weather. The first part of the normal route was used but the course then descended into Mosedale from Black Sail Pass before ascending to Lingmell Nose and rejoining the standard route.

Although it is held in July, the race has on many occasions been affected by inclement weather. Navigational problems in poor visibility have often caused runners to go off course. In 1985 even Billy Bland, the course record holder and winner on several occasions, went the wrong way in the mist after Seatallan, finding himself on the wrong side of Haycock and having to go over Haycock and Scoat Fell to get back on course.

Wasdale has frequently been one of the counting races in the British and English Fell Running Championships.

== Results ==
The men's course record is 3:25:21, set by Billy Bland in 1982. Bland considers the record to be one of his best performances along with the Borrowdale Fell Race record, and better than his Bob Graham Round record which he had set three weeks before the 1982 Wasdale Race. No other runner has run within five minutes of Bland's Wasdale record.

The women's record is 4:12:17, set jointly by Jackie Lee and Janet McIver in 2008.

Billy Bland has the most wins, with nine between 1980 and 1988. Jasmin Paris has won the women's race seven times between 2012 and 2021.

The winners have been as follows.

Year	Men	Time	Women	Time
1972	Jeff Norman and Harry Walker	4:25:10		
1973	Joss Naylor	3:48:55		
1974	Andy Churchill	3:53:12		
1975	Joss Naylor	3:41:49		
1976	Ian Roberts	3:38:35		
1977	Mike Short	3:53:15	Joan Lancaster	1:10:10^{[A]}
1978	Andy Styan	3:39:15	Sue Parkin	0:58:22^{[A]}
1979	Andy Styan	3:30:51	Jean Lochhead	0:54:22^{[A]}
1980	Billy Bland	3:37:51	Pauline Haworth	4:51:20
1981	Billy Bland	3:35:10	Ros Coats	3:16:23^{[B]}
1982	Billy Bland	3:25:21	Sue Parkin	4:45:39
1983	Billy Bland	3:49:50	Bridget Hogge	5:35:45
1984	Billy Bland	3:42:27	Bridget Hogge	5:08:28
1985	Billy Bland	3:55:29	Angela Carson	5:00:31
1986	Billy Bland	3:42:31	Angela Carson	4:36:47
1987	Billy Bland	3:33:07	Nicola Lavery	4:50:23
1988	Billy Bland	3:34:33	Clare Crofts	4:45:20
1989	Colin Donnelly	3:41:33	Ruth Pickvance	4:42:57
1990	Mark Rigby	3:37:08	Helene Diamantides	4:28:35
1991	James Bulman	4:20:18	Sue Ratcliffe	5:14:32
1992	Phil Clark	3:57:18	Wendy Dodds	5:20:51
1993	Jonathan Bland	3:57:31	Sarah Rowell	4:33:51
1994	Gavin Bland	3:53:56	Ruth Pickvance	4:31:12
1995	Jonathan Bland	3:51:15	Emma Moody	5:20:53
1996	Gavin Bland	4:11:55	None	
1997	Jonathan Bland	3:48:18	Mari Todd	4:22:10
1998	Jim Davies	3:46:07	Liz Batt	5:39:59
1999	Simon Booth	3:44:50	Wendy Dodds	5:28:19
2000	Andy Trigg	4:13:00	Wendy Dodds	5:29:57
2001	Cancelled due to foot-and-mouth outbreak			
2002	Andrew Schofield	3:59:29	Angela Brand-Barker	5:02:57
2003	Rob Jebb	3:46:48	Jackie Lee	5:19:51
2004	Phil Davies	3:53:55	Nicola Davies	5:08:35
2005	Simon Booth	3:44:56	Sally Newman	4:46:40
2006	Lloyd Taggart	3:48:51	Jackie Lee	4:19:08
2007	Ricky Lightfoot	3:45:20	Helen Garrett	5:05:31
2008	Pete Vale	3:51:07	Jackie Lee and Janet McIver	4:12:17
2009	Rob Jebb	3:46:39	Philippa Jackson	4:38:21
2010	Ben Abdelnoor	4:33:05	Jane Reedy	5:11:56
2011	Ben Abdelnoor	3:46:11	Hazel Robinson	5:11:09
2012	Ricky Lightfoot	3:44:44	Jasmin Paris	4:30:54
2013	Ben Abdelnoor	3:55:19	Jasmin Paris	4:35:28
2014	Simon Harding	4:09:38	Jasmin Paris	4:13:05
2015	Ricky Lightfoot	3:57:04	Jasmin Paris	4:14:33
2016	Neil Talbott	4:11:35	Jasmin Paris	4:50:40
2017	Carl Bell	3:40:53	Anna Lupton	4:41:26
2018	Rhys Findlay-Robinson	3:59:55	Jasmin Paris	4:29:48
2019	Rob Jebb	3:56:10	Sharon Taylor	4:42:26
2020	Cancelled due to the COVID-19 pandemic			
2021	Ricky Lightfoot	4:05:44	Jasmin Paris	4:35:34
2022	Philip Rutter	3:56:38	Victoria Thompson	4:57:39
2023	Finlay Wild	3:46:33	Victoria Thompson	5:01:22
2024	Finlay Wild	3:37:42	Nichola Jackson	4:29:23
2025	Calum Tinnion	4:34:33	Katie Mckay	5:50:18
2026^{[C]}	Tom Spencer	2:56:49	Tanya Raab	4:11:13

^{A} Burnmoor Chase route.

^{B} The women ran a shorter course than the men in 1981.

^{C} Short course.
