= Sedbergh Hills Fell Race =

Annual fell running race in Cumbria, England

The Sedbergh Hills Fell Race is an annual fell running race in Cumbria, England. The race starts and finishes in Sedbergh and has a distance of approximately 22.5km and contains 1830m of ascent. It is usually run in August. The inaugural event was held in 1979. The ladies' race was held over a shorter course that year, but subsequently the women ran the same route as the men. In its early years, the race was organised by Mike Walford on behalf of Kendal Athletic Club.

== Course ==
From Sedbergh the course makes a clockwise loop. It initially heads up to Arant Haw (605m) and then to Castley Knotts. Then around Brown Moor, Fell Head and Hazelgill Knott. The course turns south to The Calf (676m) past Arant Haw again to Winder (473m) before heading down into Sedbergh.

== Winners ==
Year	Men	Time (h:m:s)	Women	Time (h:m:s)	Refs
2026	George Foster	2:09:26	Poppy Wardle	2:49:22	
2025	Sam Stead	2:17:04	Bianca Dyer	3:16:19	
2024	Jack Wood	2:22:49	Emily Cowper-Coles	2:36:48	
2023	Billy Cartwright	2:04:23	Nichola Jackson	2:28:04	
2022	Garry Greenhow	2:23:04	Eleanor Johnstone	2:51:32	
2021	Sam Dixon	2:31:09	Helen Leigh	3:11:01	
2020	Cancelled due to the COVID-19 pandemic				
2019	James Harris	2:22:21	Katie Kaars Sijpesteijn	2:49:44	
2018	Rob Jebb	2:20:22	Sharon Taylor	2:51:03	
2017	Garry Greenhow	2:20:44	Zoe Harding	2:43:48	
2016	Steven Snape	2:26:55	Nina Walkingshaw	2:57:53	
2015	Joe Symonds	2:13:40	Nicky Spinks	2:56:29	
2014	Rob Hope	2:06:10	Victoria Wilkinson	2:19:34	
2013	Rob Jebb	2:11:14	Victoria Wilkinson	2:28:31	
2012	Andy Brown	2:22:06	Fiona Hughes	2:44:26	
2011	Morgan Donnelly	2:02:44	Jackie Lee	2:32:43	
2010	Jon Morgan	2:18:55	Karen Davison	2:43:15	
2009	Rick Stuart	2:21:03	Nicky Spinks	3:00:47	
2008	Darren Kay	2:23:34	Gayle Sugden	2:55:51	
2007	Joe Symonds	2:10:50	Alison Raw	2:47:42	
2006	Rob Jebb	1:59:41	Natalie White	2:25:21	
2005	Rob Jebb	2:10:35	Nicola Davies	2:43:41	
2004	Colin Donnelly	2:13:22	Clare Kenny	3:01:29	
2003	Joe Blackett	2:26:44	Katy Thompson	3:24:02	
2002	Rob Hope	2:10:48	Andrea Priestley	2:28:39	
2001	Cancelled due to foot-and-mouth outbreak				
2000	Mark Roberts	2:12:15	Vanessa Peacock	2:49:08	
1999	Steve Birkinshaw	2:21:35	Vanessa Peacock	2:34:36	
1998	Simon Booth	2:00:04	Vanessa Peacock	2:33:12	
1997	Jim Davies	2:14:06	Nicola Davies	2:49:36	
1996	Colin Donnelly	2:13:10	Vanessa Peacock	2:47:34	
1995	Robin Jamieson	2:07:11	Vanessa Peacock	2:31:40	
1994	Robin Jamieson	2:06:36	Ruth Pickvance	2:34:46	
1993	Robin Jamieson	2:10:31	Sue Parkin	2:44:40	
1992	John Taylor	2:02:49	Sheila Wright	2:37:56	
1991	Keith Anderson	1:57:11	Janet Kenyon	2:41:35	
1990	Keith Anderson	2:07:33	Sue Parkin	2:49:33	
1989	Keith Anderson	2:01:59	Kath Martin	2:43:48	
1988	Hugh Symonds	2:02:53	Vanessa Brindle	2:29:26	
1987	Robin Bergstrand	2:08:28	Sue Parkin	2:52:23	
1986	Robin Bergstrand	1:59:33			
1985	Hugh Symonds	2:05:43	Jean Lochhead	2:55:36	
1984	Jon Broxap	2:07:11	Gillian Wilkinson	2:54:05	
1983	Hugh Symonds	2:01:37			
1982	Kenny Stuart	2:06:37	Carol McNeill	3:03:03	
1981	Bob Whitfield	2:05:36	Pauline Haworth	2:41:49	
1980	John McGee	2:14:05	Ros Coats	3:02:22	
1979	Billy Bland	2:14:40	Bridget Hogge	2:05:26	^{[Note 1]}

Note 1: The women ran a shorter course than the men in 1979.
