= Three Shires Fell Race =

Annual race in Little Langdale

The Three Shires Fell Race is an annual Lake District fell race held in September.

The original route started and finished at the Three Shires Inn in Little Langdale. After an initial run along the valley, the route climbed steeply to Wetherlam, then down to Prison Band and up to the summit of Swirl How. The course then dropped to the Three Shire Stone at the top of the Wrynose Pass, the meeting point of the historic counties of Cumberland, Lancashire and Westmorland. An ascent of Pike of Blisco followed, then the route dropped to Blea Tarn before the final climb to Lingmoor Fell and descent to the finish. The route was approximately 18 kilometres (11 mi) in length with 1,360 metres (4,460 ft) of ascent.

In 2025, the route was changed for logistical reasons to start and finish at Tilberthwaite and to mostly follow the traditional course but in the opposite direction.

== History ==
The inaugural race was held in 1983. The leading organiser was Ian Stephenson of the Three Shires Inn, who was assisted by Selwyn Wright who later became the main organiser. In 2025, Wright's son Jack and Sean Leckey became the race co-organisers.

In 1984, the prizes were presented by Chris Brasher, the gold medallist in the 3000m steeplechase at the 1956 Olympic Games. Brasher also competed in that edition of the Three Shires but did not finish the race. A junior race was added to the event that year. In some later years, the junior races featured as age group championship races and participating runners included Rob Hope, Victoria Wilkinson and Rob Jebb.

The 1990 women's race was won by Mari Todd who was then only seventeen years old. She went on to win the English Fell Running Championships in 1997.

The Three Shires has been one of the counting races in the English Fell Running Championships, including the 1993 edition. In 1997 it was again an English Championships counter as well as a home international with England winning the team race, followed by Scotland and then Wales.

After the 2024 edition, loss of the use of the field at the Three Shires Inn for race assembly, along with parking difficulties, led to the start and finish being moved to Tilberthwaite from 2025. Concurrently, the route was changed to be largely the reverse of the original course and the Swirl How checkpoint was moved to neighbouring Great Carrs.

The Three Shires is one of the races in the Lakeland Classics Trophy series which was established in 2002.

== Results ==
The male and female course records on the traditional route were both set in 1997, by Gavin Bland with a time of 1:45:08 and Mari Todd with 2:05:29. The men's record was not approached after that year, but Victoria Wilkinson was within thirty seconds of the women's record in 2016.

Ricky Lightfoot has the greatest number of wins amongst the men, with five between 2007 and 2016. Mari Todd and Vanessa Brindle (now Vanessa Peacock) have won the women's race the most times, with three victories each.

The winners have been as follows.

Year	Men	Time	Women	Time
1983	Billy Bland	1:56:19	Linda Lord	2:43:19
1984	Bob Whitfield	1:53:08	Pauline Haworth	2:18:44
1985	Mark Rigby	2:01:10	Stephanie Quirk	2:54:18
1986	Mark Rigby	1:54:32	Vanessa Brindle	2:12:57
1987	Bob Whitfield	1:49:07	Vanessa Brindle	2:15:05
1988	Colin Donnelly	1:50:07	Ruth Pickvance	2:12:49
1989	Keith Anderson	1:45:55	Vanessa Brindle	2:08:45
1990	Mark Fleming	1:52:04	Mari Todd	2:14:00
1991	Gavin Bland	1:51:03	Ruth Pickvance	2:19:13
1992	Jason Bradley	2:00:29	Mari Todd	2:26:44
1993	Gavin Bland	1:47:59	Carol Greenwood	2:13:58
1994	Robin Jamieson	1:55:17	Glynda Cook	2:23:21
1995	Andrew Davies	1:52:40	Glynda Cook	2:23:49
1996	Jim Davies	1:47:33	Andrea Priestley	2:10:06
1997	Gavin Bland	1:45:08	Mari Todd	2:05:29
1998	Paul Sheard	1:58:28	Yvette Hague	2:12:05
1999	Jim Davies	1:51:30	Nicola Davies	2:14:29
2000	Andy Kitchen	2:03:39	Nicky Lavery	2:35:31
2001	Cancelled due to foot-and-mouth outbreak			
2002	Mark Hayman	1:59:43	Hilda Bransby	2:28:23
2003	Tim Austin	1:55:23	Sue Wood	2:19:06
2004	Simon Stainer	1:57:56	Lou Sharp	2:18:28
2005	Steve Bottomley	1:56:29	Karen Davison	2:17:24
2006	Nick Sharp	2:03:00	Helene Diamantides	2:20:26
2007	Ricky Lightfoot	1:53:05	Jackie Lee	2:13:49
2008	Ricky Lightfoot	1:57:23	Janet McIver	2:08:49
2009	Chris Steele	1:57:42	Mary Gillie	2:28:59
2010	Ricky Lightfoot	1:55:49	~~Lauren Jeska~~^{[A]}	~~2:13:21~~
2011	Carl Bell	2:00:20	Hazel Robinson	2:29:42
2012	Rhys Findlay-Robinson	1:59:44	Jasmin Paris	2:16:26
2013	Ben Abdelnoor	2:05:11	Jane Reedy	2:29:57
2014	Rhys Findlay-Robinson	1:54:38	Jasmin Paris	2:12:11
2015	Ricky Lightfoot	1:56:44	Judith Jepson	2:23:39
2016	Ricky Lightfoot	1:57:22	Victoria Wilkinson	2:05:55
2017	Jonny Malley	2:01:55	Claire Nance	2:33:28
2018	Jack Wood	1:54:30	Natalie Beadle	2:31:47
2019	Garry Greenhow	2:00:45	Natalie Beadle	2:32:06
2020	Cancelled due to the COVID-19 pandemic			
2021	Matt Atkinson	2:01:20	Lizzie Richardson	2:38:31
2022	Jack Wright	1:56:33	Majka Kunicka	2:26:40
2023	Luke Fisher	1:51:22	Frances Collett	2:32:05
2024	Finlay Grant	1:55:59	Bryony Halcrow	2:24:06
2025	Tom Simpson	2:07:27	Sharon Taylor	2:55:21
2026	Sam Bentham	2:03:51	Jasmin Paris	2:41:47

^{A} Jeska was a transgender runner who competed as a woman. However, doubts were raised over whether she was eligible to compete as a woman and her results were declared null and void. Jeska excluded, the first woman in the 2010 race was Tracey Greenway in a time of 2:27:02.
