= Peris Horseshoe =

Fell running race in Snowdonia, Wales

The Peris Horseshoe is an annual fell running race in Snowdonia, Wales. The race starts and finishes in Llanberis and has a distance of approximately 28 km and 2590 m of ascent. It is usually run in September. The event is organised by Eryri Harriers. It was first held in 1987, when it was organised by Arthur Clarke.

There is also a shorter Half Peris race, finishing at Pen-y-Pass, which is held in conjunction with the Horseshoe.

== Course ==
Starting from Llanberis, the course heads out from the Slate Museum through the disused slate quarry. The first summit is that of Elidir Fawr followed by Y Garn and Glyder Fawr. The course descends to Pen-y-Pass to cross the A4086 road, then ascends via the Miners track to Lliwedd and via the Watkin Path to the summit of Snowdon. The course joins the Snowdon Ranger Path and then ascends Moel Cynghorion and returns to Llanberis beside Dolbadarn Castle.

== Winners ==
The fastest men's time is 3:02:49 set by Gavin Bland in 1994. The event was one of the counting races in the British Fell Running Championships that year. The quickest women's time is 3:28:14 by Menna Angharad in 1996, when the race was also a championship counter. Angharad's performance has been considered to be one of the strongest female course records in fell running.

Year	Men	Time (h:m:s)	Women	Time (h:m:s)	Refs
2025	Jacob Hiom	3:26:56	Katie Reynolds	4:03:37	^{[Note 1]}
2024	Finlay Grant	3:14:58	Naomi Lang	3:30:50	
2023	Tom Wood	3:17:02	Joanne Henderson	4:19:08	
2022	Dave Appleton	3:44:56	Kate Macfarlane	4:21:42	
2021	Gavin Roberts	3:40:42	Sarah Ridgway	4:23:40	
2020	Cancelled due to the COVID-19 pandemic				
2019	Matthew Fortes	3:18:42	Sarah Ridgway	3:43:35	^{[Note 1]}
2018	Huw Davies	3:46:34	Miranda Grant	4:00:50	
2017	Gareth Wyn Hughes	3:27:02	Andrea Rowlands	4:22:50	
2016	Pete Vale	3:33:30	Andrea Rowlands	4:13:33	
2015	John Hunt	4:07:52	Louise Beetlestone	4:59:14	
2014	Pete Vale	3:31:30	Andrea Rowlands	4:08:47	
2013	Rob Jebb	3:12:29	Victoria Wilkinson	3:38:06	
2012	Tim Higginbottom	3:37:58	Andrea Rowlands	4:12:56	
2011	Iain Ridgway	3:08:26			^{[Note 1]}
2010	Simon Caldrick	3:29:23	Jenny Heming	4:04:32	
2009	Pete Vale	3:16:16	Andrea Rowlands	4:05:10	
2008	Lloyd Taggart	3:20:47	Jackie Lee	3:49:19	
2007	Charlie Stead	3:24:43	Sarah Kleeman	4:01:00	
2006	Rob Jebb	3:15:27	Christine Howard	3:58:22	
2005	James McQueen	3:27:02	Jackie Lee	3:48:13	
2004	Dylan Jones	3:22:34	Jackie Lee	3:59:11	
2003	Robin Halliday	3:49:46	Jackie Lee	4:17:30	
2002	James McQueen	3:33:15	Victoria Musgrove	4:38:44	
2001	John Hunt	3:35:40	Gill Harris	4:26:35	
2000	Trefor Jones	3:35:15	Gill Harris	5:04:25	
1999	James McQueen	2:50:24	Helene Diamantides	3:09:21	^{[Note 1]}
1998	Mark Kinch	3:20:20	Polly Gibb	4:15:29	
1997	James McQueen	3:11:00	Menna Angharad	3:45:26	
1996	Ian Holmes	3:05:41	Menna Angharad	3:28:14	
1995	Adam Haynes	3:21:48	Menna Angharad	3:33:45	
1994	Gavin Bland	3:02:49	Angela Brand-Barker	3:45:22	
1993	Colin Donnelly	3:23:13	Katherine Harvey	4:16:23	
1992	Colin Donnelly	3:13:30	Clare Crofts	4:13:03	
1991	Paul Brownson	3:25:02	Lydia Kirk	4:12:00	
1990	Colin Donnelly	3:25:17	Stel Farrar	4:39:38	
1989	Huw Parry	3:29:39	Stel Farrar	4:02:38	
1988	Colin Donnelly	3:08:09	Angela Carson	4:05:08	
1987	Colin Donnelly	3:19:55	Angela Carson	4:14:48	

Note 1: Race shortened.
