= Borrowdale Fell Race =

Fell running competition in Cumbria, England

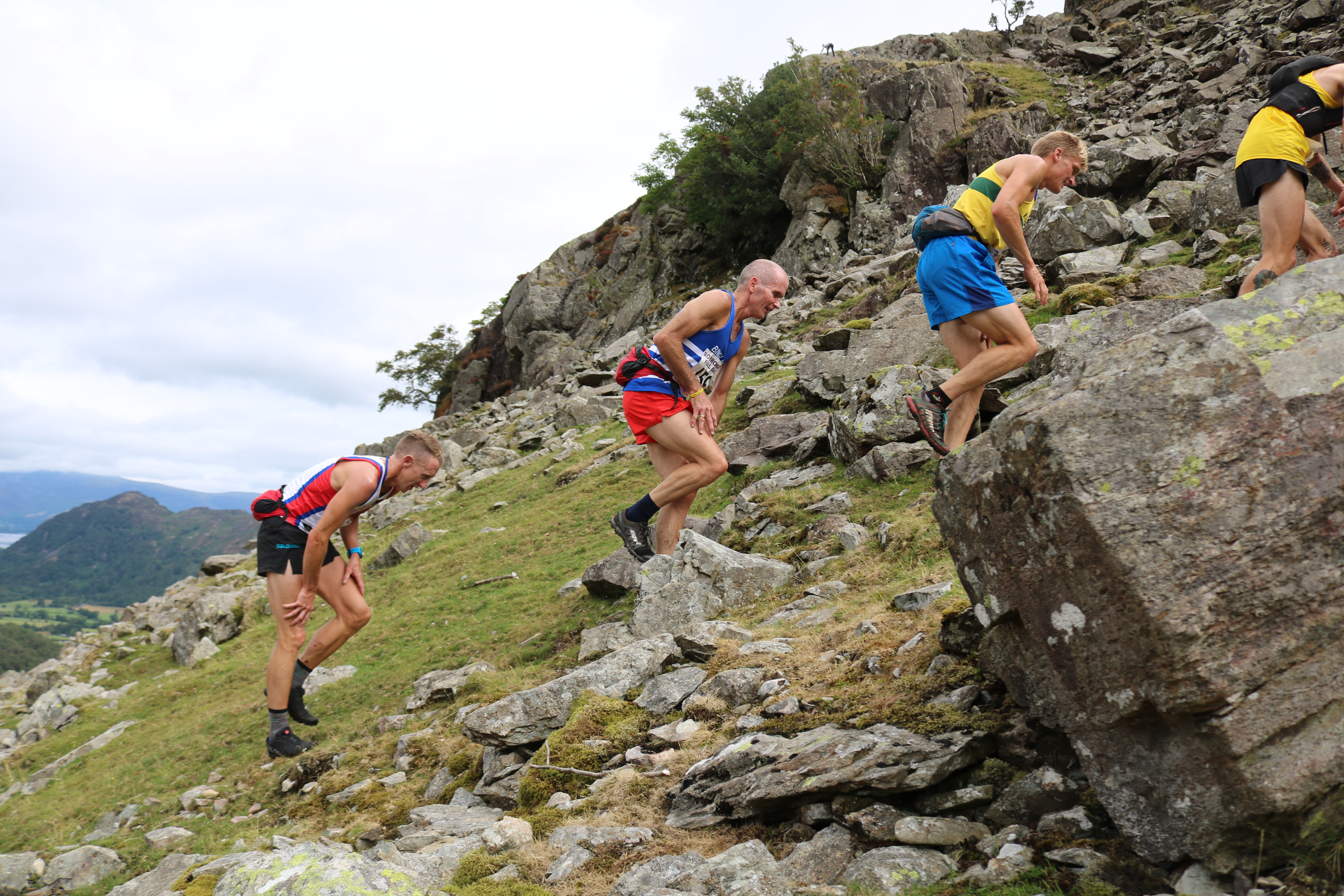
2018 Borrowdale Fell Race Ian Holmes

The Borrowdale Fell Race is an annual fell race held in August, starting and finishing in Rosthwaite. It is considered to be one of the "classic" Lakeland races and the route initially heads over Bessyboot before climbing England's highest summit, Scafell Pike. Great Gable is then scaled before a descent to Honister Pass and the final climb up Dale Head. The distance is approximately 17 miles (27 kilometres) and the route has around 6,500 feet (2,000 metres) of ascent.

== History ==
The race, sponsored by Miles Jessop of the Scafell Hotel, Borrowdale, and the New Dungeon Ghyll Hotel, Langdale, was originally intended to link those two establishments. However, Chris Bland, Andy Ewing and others decided on the route via Bessyboot, Esk Hause, Scafell Pike, Great Gable, Honister Hause and Dale Head. The inaugural race was held in 1974 and in that year only, there was an extra checkpoint in Tongue Gill on the descent to Rosthwaite.

In 2001, a foot-and-mouth outbreak led to the cancellation of many fell races. Borrowdale was one of the first to take place as the access restrictions were reduced, and Prince Philip presented the prizes to the leading runners that year.

In 2003, the route to the first checkpoint on Bessyboot was changed following concerns about the possibility of serious injuries due to falling rocks on the steep climb.

The 2007 race was run over a shortened course due to inclement weather. After the climb up Bessyboot and traverse to Esk Hause, runners were directed to Sty Head, missing out Scafell Pike on which conditions were considered to be unsafe. From Sty Head, the usual route was rejoined with the ascent of Great Gable.

A forecast thunderstorm at the time of the 2021 race resulted in a shorter route of around 8 miles (13 kilometres) being used that year. The course went over High Spy and Dale Head, then down to Honister before returning to Rosthwaite.

Borrowdale is one of the Lakeland Classics Trophy races and it has frequently been one of the counting races in the English or British Fell Running Championships.

== Results ==
The men's course record is held by Billy Bland with a time of 2:34:38 set in 1981. The fastest time in the years since then is 2:35:18 by Simon Booth in the 1999 event when the race was featured on the BBC’s Grandstand. The women's record is 3:15:33 by Jasmin Paris in 2015. Due to course changes, this superseded the time of 3:14:36 set by Menna Angharad in 1997.

Simon Booth has the most wins, with twelve between 1995 and 2010. Billy Bland won ten times between 1976 and 1988. Sarah Haines won the women’s race five times between 1985 and 1990.

A board showing the winners of the race is on permanent display in the Scafell Hotel.

The winners have been as follows.

Year	Men	Time	Women	Time
1974	Dave Halstead	3:05:07^{[Note 1]}		
1975	Mike Short	3:13:30		
1976	Billy Bland	2:53:30		
1977	Mike Short	2:49:03		
1978	Mike Short	2:44:52		
1979	Billy Bland	2:37:11		
1980	Billy Bland	2:41:31	Pauline Haworth	3:50:45
1981	Billy Bland	2:34:38	Ros Coats	3:30:30
1982	Billy Bland	2:43:38	Rosie Naish	3:55:13
1983	Kenny Stuart	2:45:25	Daphne Varney	3:54:30
1984	Billy Bland	2:37:45	Pauline Haworth	3:26:05
1985	Billy Bland	2:42:13	Sarah Haines	4:13:43
1986	Billy Bland	2:52:38	Sarah Haines	4:29:17
1987	Billy Bland	2:41:18	Sarah Haines	3:50:23
1988	Billy Bland	2:42:50	Sarah Haines	3:38:26
1989	Dave Spedding	2:50:37	Sue Mackay	3:53:17
1990	Mark Rigby	2:40:07	Sarah Haines	3:29:19
1991	Gavin Bland	2:40:37	Helene Diamantides	3:26:05
1992	Gavin Bland	2:43:33	Helene Diamantides	3:30:31
1993	Gavin Bland	2:47:43	Mari Todd	3:53:40
1994	Ian Holmes	2:42:22	Nicola Davies	3:37:31
1995	Simon Booth	2:49:33	Menna Angharad	3:25:33
1996	Ian Holmes	2:45:56	Sarah Rowell	3:15:34
1997	Jonathan Bland	2:42:04	Menna Angharad	3:14:36
1998	Simon Booth	2:40:18	Louise Osborn	3:46:06
1999	Simon Booth	2:35:18	Helene Diamantides	3:14:45
2000	Simon Booth	2:42:46	Janet King	3:17:19
2001	Simon Booth	2:47:13	Hilde Krynen	3:56:03
2002	Simon Booth	2:50:20	Helen Jackson	3:58:10
2003	Simon Booth	2:49:12	Nicola Davies	3:46:18
2004	Simon Booth	2:50:37	Jill Mykura	3:41:02
2005	Simon Booth	2:46:18	Nicola Davies	3:40:25
2006	Simon Booth	3:01:48	Helene Diamantides	3:44:24
2007^{[Note 2]}	Ben Bardsley	2:18:29	Sharon Taylor	3:03:10
2008	Simon Booth	2:49:50	Janet McIver	3:25:34
2009	Rob Jebb	2:51:54	Mary Gillie	4:00:24
2010	Simon Booth	2:52:42	Philippa Maddams	3:19:42
2011	Ben Abdelnoor	2:52:37	Andrea Rowlands	3:47:43
2012	Ricky Lightfoot	2:49:20	Jasmin Paris	3:32:03
2013	Ricky Lightfoot	2:51:24	Nicky Spinks	3:53:13
2014	Ricky Lightfoot	3:03:16	Judith Jepson	3:56:59
2015	Ricky Lightfoot	2:54:14	Jasmin Paris	3:15:33
2016	Ricky Lightfoot	2:49:21	Lou Roberts	3:26:09
2017	Carl Bell	2:50:05	Catherine Spurden	3:45:14
2018	Ricky Lightfoot	2:51:59	Jasmin Paris	3:32:46
2019	Ricky Lightfoot	3:03:57	Majka Kunicka	4:00:05
2020	Cancelled due to the COVID-19 pandemic			
2021^{[Note 2]}	Ricky Lightfoot	1:16:00	Sharon Taylor	1:33:14
2022	Brennan Townshend	2:58:42	Anna Lupton	3:48:04
2023	Brennan Townshend	2:53:16	Holly Wootten	3:49:05
2024	Tom Simpson	3:01:24	Nichola Jackson	3:26:16
2025	Finlay Wild	2:49:26	Eve Pannone	3:39:16
2026	Harry Bolton	2:54:55	Beth Pascall	3:52:16

Note 1: Halstead's time is given as 3:05:57 on the winners’ board but as 3:05:07 in other sources.

Note 2: The 2007 and 2021 races were run over shorter courses.
