= Gavin Bland =

British fell runner (born 1971)

Gavin Bland (born 21 November 1971) is a British fell runner who was a British and English champion and represented his country at the World Mountain Running Trophy.

== Biography ==
Gavin Bland was born in 1971 in Penrith, Cumbria, and grew up on his family's farm in Borrowdale. The prominent fell runner Billy Bland is his uncle, and several other members of his family were active in the sport. He attended Keswick School, leaving aged sixteen to work on the family farm.

Bland was successful in races as a youth. His first senior race was in 1989. Perhaps the most notable performance in the early part of his running career was a second place in the junior race at the World Mountain Running Trophy in 1990. He also represented England in senior races at the World Mountain Running Trophy in 1991 and 1992.

In 1991, Bland won the English Fell Running Championships and was second to Keith Anderson in the British Championships. In 1999, he won both the British and English Championships. This was despite being a self-acknowledged "lazy trainer", though his work as a shepherd meant that he spent a lot of time on the fells in addition to his specific training.

Throughout the 1990s, Bland was particularly successful at the most prestigious or "classic" long fell races. His wins included the Ben Nevis Race, Borrowdale, the Ennerdale Horseshoe, the Peris Horseshoe, the Three Peaks, Wasdale, the Welsh 1000m Peaks, the Edale Skyline, Duddon Valley, Holme Moss, the Three Shires and the Langdale Horseshoe.

After the interruption of fell running by the 2001 foot-and-mouth outbreak, Bland featured less prominently in races but had occasional returns to good form, winning counters in the English or British Championships series at Langdale in 2003 and Silent Valley in 2013. He still holds the race records for the Three Shires, Peris Horseshoe and the Carnethy 5.
