= Finlay Wild =

Scottish doctor and runner

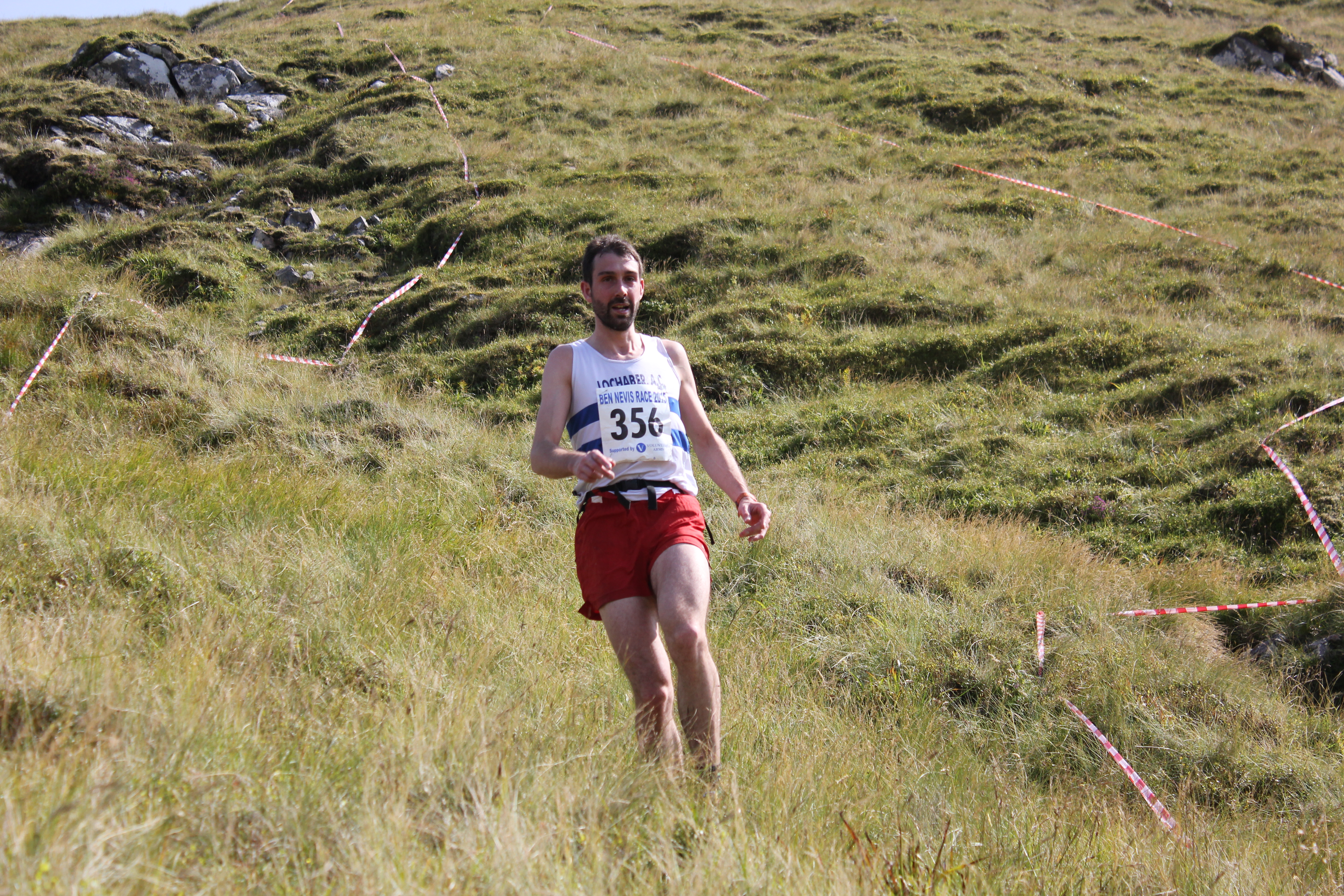

Personal information
- Full name: Finlay Wild
- Nationality: British
- Born: 8 September 1984 (age 41)

Finlay Wild (born 8 September 1984) is a Scottish runner and mountaineer who has been a British fell running champion. He has won the Ben Nevis Race twelve times.

== Early life and professional career ==
Wild was born on 8 September 1984 in Thurso. He gained an affinity with the outdoors through his parents Roger Wild, a mountain guide, and Fiona (née Hinde), an accomplished hill runner who won the Three Peaks Race in 1981 and the Carnethy 5 in 1981 and 1982. He was educated at Fort William primary school and Lochaber High School, then graduated with a medical degree from the University of Aberdeen. He works as a general practitioner in Lochaber.

== Sporting career ==
Wild first took part in a hill race at Ben Rinnes in 2005. He came to prominence through the Ben Nevis Race which he first won in 2010. His tally of twelve Ben Nevis victories is higher than that of any other runner in the history of the event.

In 2012, he set a new course record for the Glamaig Hill Race, breaking the previous best set by Mark Rigby in 1997. He improved the record by a further five seconds in 2018. Wild's other wins include the Carnethy 5, Goatfell race, the Isle of Jura, Stuc a' Chroin, the Ennerdale Horseshoe, the Langdale Horseshoe, Wasdale and Borrowdale. He won the British Fell Running Championships in 2015 and again in 2022. He has also won the Lakeland Classics Trophy.

Wild has the fastest known time for the Cuillin Ridge traverse on the Isle of Skye, completing the crossing in 2:59:22 in 2013. In February 2016, Wild and Tim Gomersall made a winter crossing of the Cuillin Ridge in a time of 6:14.

In 2016, Wild's results in the Tromsø SkyRace and the Glen Coe Skyline gave him third place in the Extreme section of the Skyrunner World Series.

In October 2016, he set a record time of 10:15:30 for Tranter's Round in the mountains around Glen Nevis. He further reduced the time to 9:00:05 in July 2020 and then to 8:52 in July 2022, but the latter record only lasted one day until it was beaten by Jack Kuenzle with a time of 8:38. Wild retook the record in June 2024 with a time of 8:27:53.

In May 2019, Wild ran the Welsh 3000s in a time of 4:10:48 which broke the long-standing record of 4:19 held by Colin Donnelly since 1988.

Wild set a record for the Ramsay Round in August 2020, completing the route solo and unsupported in a time of 14:42:40. He also completed the Rigby Round of Munros in the Cairngorms in July 2021 in a record time of 16:40.

In August 2021, Wild ran the Bob Graham Round in 12:59, just outside the record at the time of 12:52 held by Kilian Jornet. Wild ran the Bob Graham Round again in January 2024, completing it between dusk and dawn in a time of 15:35, the fastest time achieved for a winter round.

In April 2022, Wild completed the Paddy Buckley Round, solo and unsupported, in a time of 15:14, beating the previous record of 16:20 set by Kim Collison.

Wild broke his own record in the Isle of Jura Fell Race in May 2022 with a time of 2:58:09, the first time any runner had completed the event in under three hours. The following month, he set a new record of 30:39 at Buckden Pike, beating Colin Donnelly's previous best from 1988.

In August 2022, Wild was victorious at both Matterhorn Ultraks and Trofeo Kima. He returned to Trofeo Kima in 2024, winning and setting a new course record of 6:05:04.

Wild has also competed in ski mountaineering and was the British champion in that sport in 2016 as well as the Scottish Skimo series winner in the 2014/2015 and 2015/2016 seasons.

== Artwork ==
Some of Wild's paintings were displayed as a solo exhibition at the John Muir Trust's Wild Space Gallery in Pitlochry for eight weeks in early 2016.
