= Angela Brand-Barker =

British runner (born 1961)

Angela Brand-Barker (née Carson) (born 3 August 1961) is a British runner who was a national fell running champion and represented her country at the World Mountain Running Trophy.

She has been considered the best female fell runner of her era in the "classic" fell races. Among Brand-Barker’s victories are the Ben Nevis Race, the Isle of Jura, the Peris Horseshoe, Wasdale and the Snowdon Race. She also holds the women’s record for the traverse of the Welsh 3000s, with a time of 5:28 set in 1989.

Brand-Barker won the British Fell Running Championships in 1983, 1986, 1993 and 1994 and the English Championships in 1998. She competed several times at the World Mountain Running Trophy. Her best performance at the global championships was a sixth place in 1988 when the event was held in Keswick.

Brand-Barker has also competed in mountain bike orienteering, being the British long distance champion in 2015 and a bronze medallist at the World Masters Mountain Bike Orienteering Championships in 2012.
