= Harrier =

Harrier may refer to:

== Animals ==
- Harrier (bird), birds in the genus Circus
- Harrier (dog)

== Media ==
- Harrier Comics, a defunct British publisher
- Space Harrier, a video game series

== Military aircraft ==
- Harrier jump jet, an overview of the Harrier family:
  - Hawker Siddeley Harrier, 1st generation Harrier
  - British Aerospace Sea Harrier, a maritime strike/air defence fighter
  - McDonnell Douglas AV-8B Harrier II, a 2nd generation Harrier
  - British Aerospace Harrier II, a 2nd generation Harrier used by the UK
- Hawker Harrier, an experimental biplane torpedo bomber aircraft built in the 1920s

== Sport ==
- Cross-country runner, sometimes referred to as harriers
- Faythe Harriers, an Irish hurling team
- Kidderminster Harriers F.C., an English football team
- One of the following athletics clubs:
  - Belgrave Harriers
  - Birchfield Harriers
  - Coventry Godiva Harriers
  - Croydon Harriers
  - Eryri Harriers; see Peris Horseshoe
  - Hash House Harriers
  - Herne Hill Harriers
  - Holmfirth Harriers
  - Ranelagh Harriers
  - Sheffield United Harriers
  - Swansea Harriers Athletics Club
  - Thames Valley Harriers
  - Tipton Harriers

== Surname ==
- Laura Harrier (born 1990), American actress and former model

== Vehicles ==
- Tata Harrier, a compact SUV built since 2018
- Toyota Harrier, a mid-size SUV built since 1997
