= Simon Booth (runner) =

English runner (born 1968)

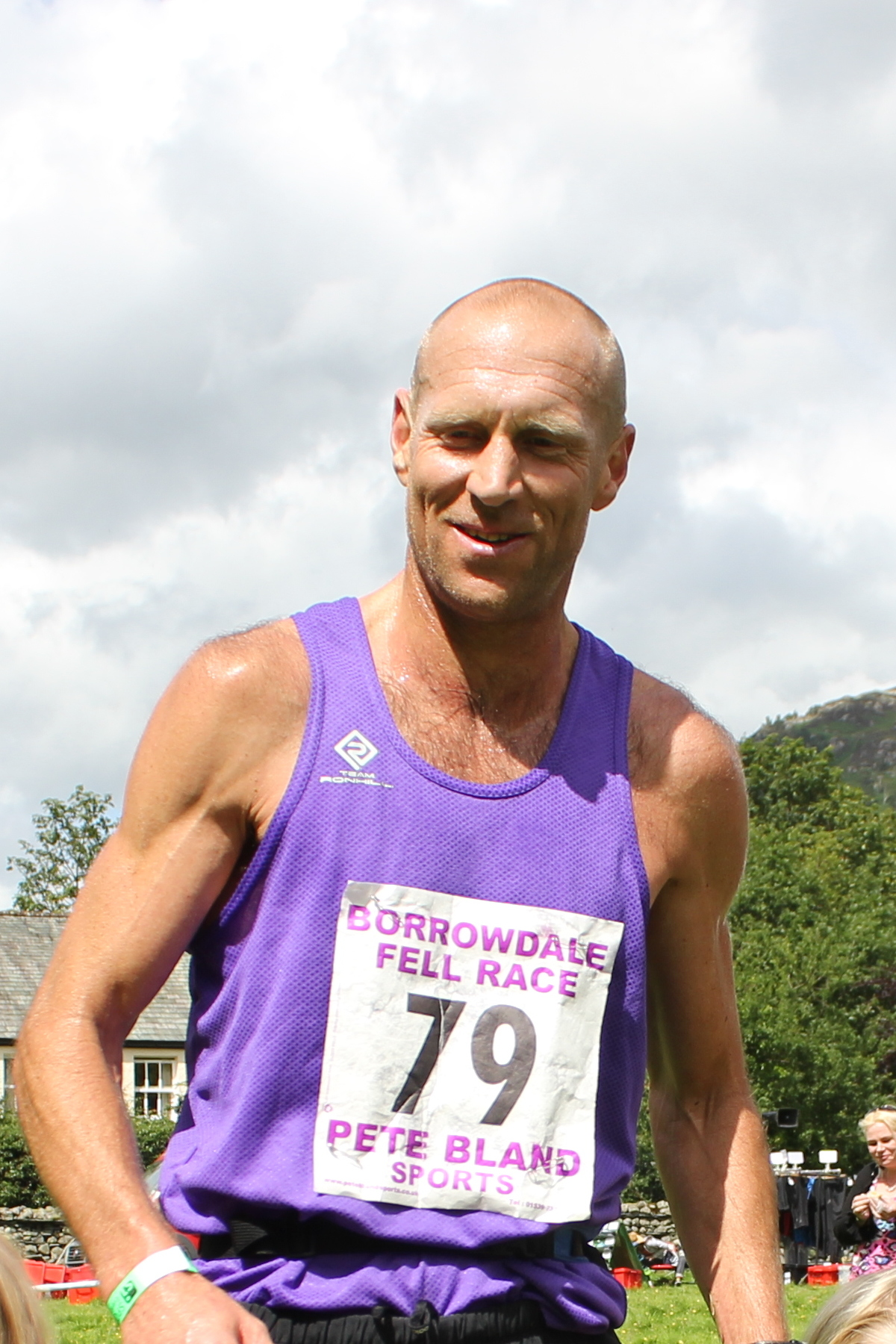
- Booth in 2015

Personal information
- Nationality: British
- Born: 10 May 1968 (age 58)

Sport
- Sport: Running

Simon Booth (born 10 May 1968) is an English runner who was twice the British fell running champion and who has represented his country at the World Mountain Running Trophy.

As a youngster, Booth’s preferred sports were rugby and football. However, an early indication of his running ability was his performance at the Cumbria Marathon from Cockermouth in 1982 when he was the first junior to finish at the age of fourteen and beat his father Bill Booth. Injuries ended Simon’s focus on rugby and after finishing second in the Borrowdale Fell Race in 1989, his attention turned to fell running.

Booth won the British Fell Running Championships in 2002 and 2005. He has performed especially well in the longer races and his wins include Wasdale, the Ennerdale Horseshoe, Great Lakes, Duddon Valley, Sedbergh Hills, the Anniversary Waltz, Buttermere Sailbeck, Langdale, the Three Peaks and Skiddaw.

He had a particularly notable sequence of results in the Borrowdale Fell Race which he won twelve times between 1995 and 2010.

Internationally, Booth competed in the Mount Kinabalu Climbathon, finishing second in the 1999 race, just two seconds behind Ian Holmes. In 2000, 2001 and 2002, he was the winner of La 6000D at La Plagne in France and he also won the Avalanche Peak Challenge in New Zealand in 2001.

He represented England at the World Mountain Running Trophy in Alaska in 2003 and in 2005, he placed second in the Skyrunner World Series.

In 2015, Booth devised the “No Cure, Always Hope, Ultra Run” from the Newlands Valley based on the 10in10 challenge routes which were set up to raise money for research on multiple sclerosis, a disease with which Booth’s brother Duncan was diagnosed in 2010.
