= Mountain race =

A mountain race may refer to:

- Hillclimbing, a type of car race involving climbing hills or mountains
- Fell running, a type of run involving climbing hills or 'fells'
- Mountain running, a type of run involving climbing hills or mountains
