= Mark Croasdale =

English athlete

Mark Croasdale (born January 1965) is an English athlete who was a British fell running champion and competed in cross-country skiing at the Winter Olympics.

The early part of Croasdale’s sporting career was centred on skiing. He became a member of the Royal Marines’ ski team and displayed sufficient talent to be invited to train with the national ski team. He was a British champion and represented his country on many occasions in international cross-country skiing competitions. He competed in the 10k classical and 15k freestyle events at the 1992 Winter Olympics.

Having taken up running as training for his skiing, Croasdale began to obtain good results as a runner. He won the Snowdon Race in 1991 and 1992 and in the latter year finished ninth in the short race at the World Mountain Running Trophy.

In 1993, Croasdale won both the British and English Fell Running Championships. His race victories in later years included the Three Peaks in 1999. He was also a frequent competitor in the Man versus Horse Marathon and was the first runner there several times. He was never able to beat the first horse, but came within two minutes of doing so in 2000.

Croasdale also raced on the roads, representing Great Britain and Northern Ireland in the 1994 World Half Marathon Championships and winning the Marine Corps Marathon in 1999.

More recently, Croasdale has been a manager for national mountain running teams.

He still holds the course records for the fell races at Ingleborough, Hutton Roof Crags, and Criffel.
