= Pippa Maddams =

British mountain runner

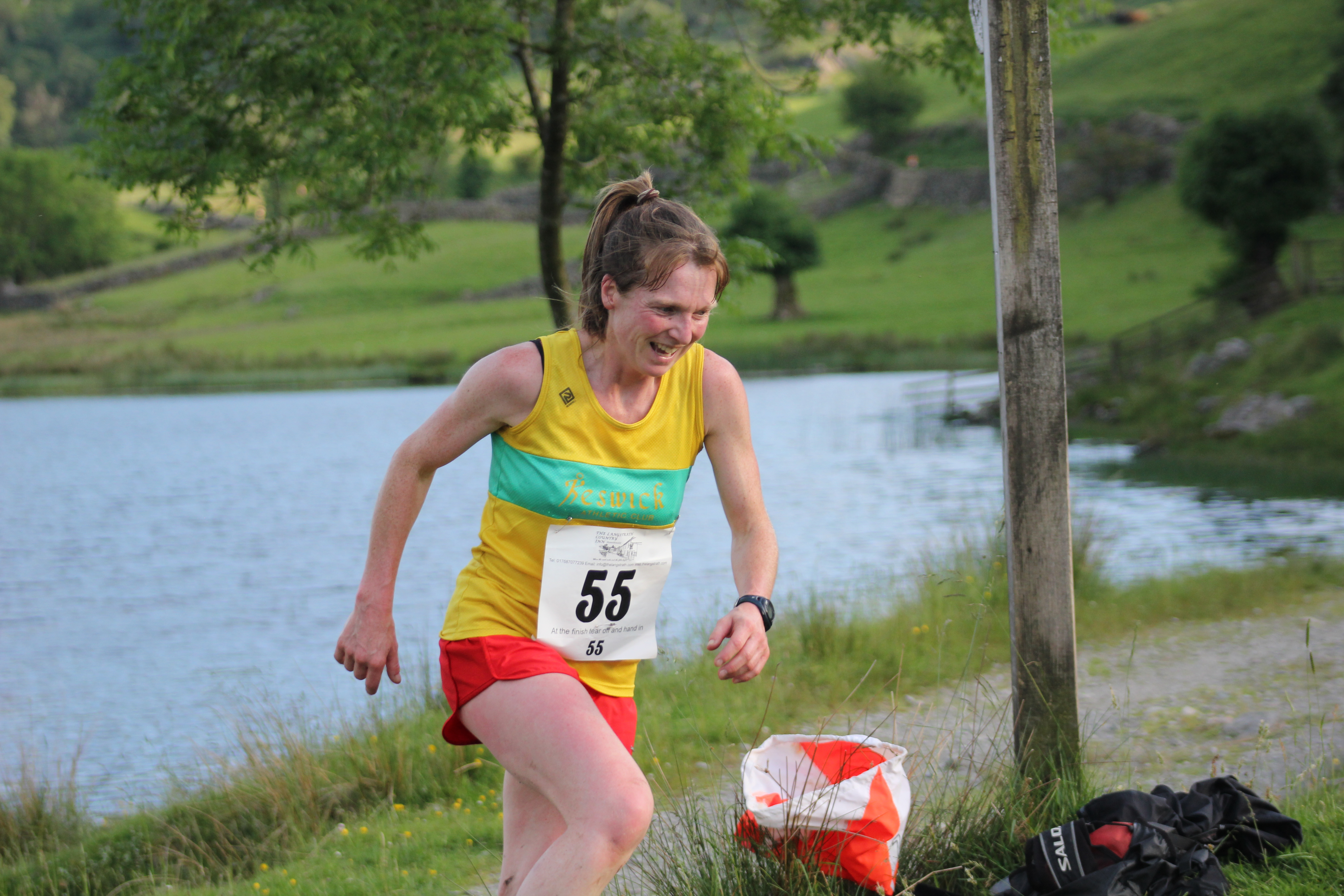
- Pippa Maddams in 2014

Personal information
- Full name: Philippa Maddams
- Nickname: Pippa
- Nationality: British
- Born: 1974 (age 51–52) Keswick, United Kingdom

Sport
- Country: United Kingdom
- Sport: Mountain running
- Club: Keswick Athletic Club

Philippa "Pippa" Maddams (née Jackson, born 1974) is a female British former mountain and fell runner who won the World Long Distance Mountain Running Challenge in 2011.

She won the British Fell Running Championships three consecutive times from 2009 to 2011 as well as the English title in 2009.

Her race victories include Wasdale in 2009, Borrowdale in 2010 and the Snowdon Race in 2011.
