= Three Peaks Race =

Fell race in the Yorkshire Three Peaks

Coordinates: 54.1509°N 2.2987°W

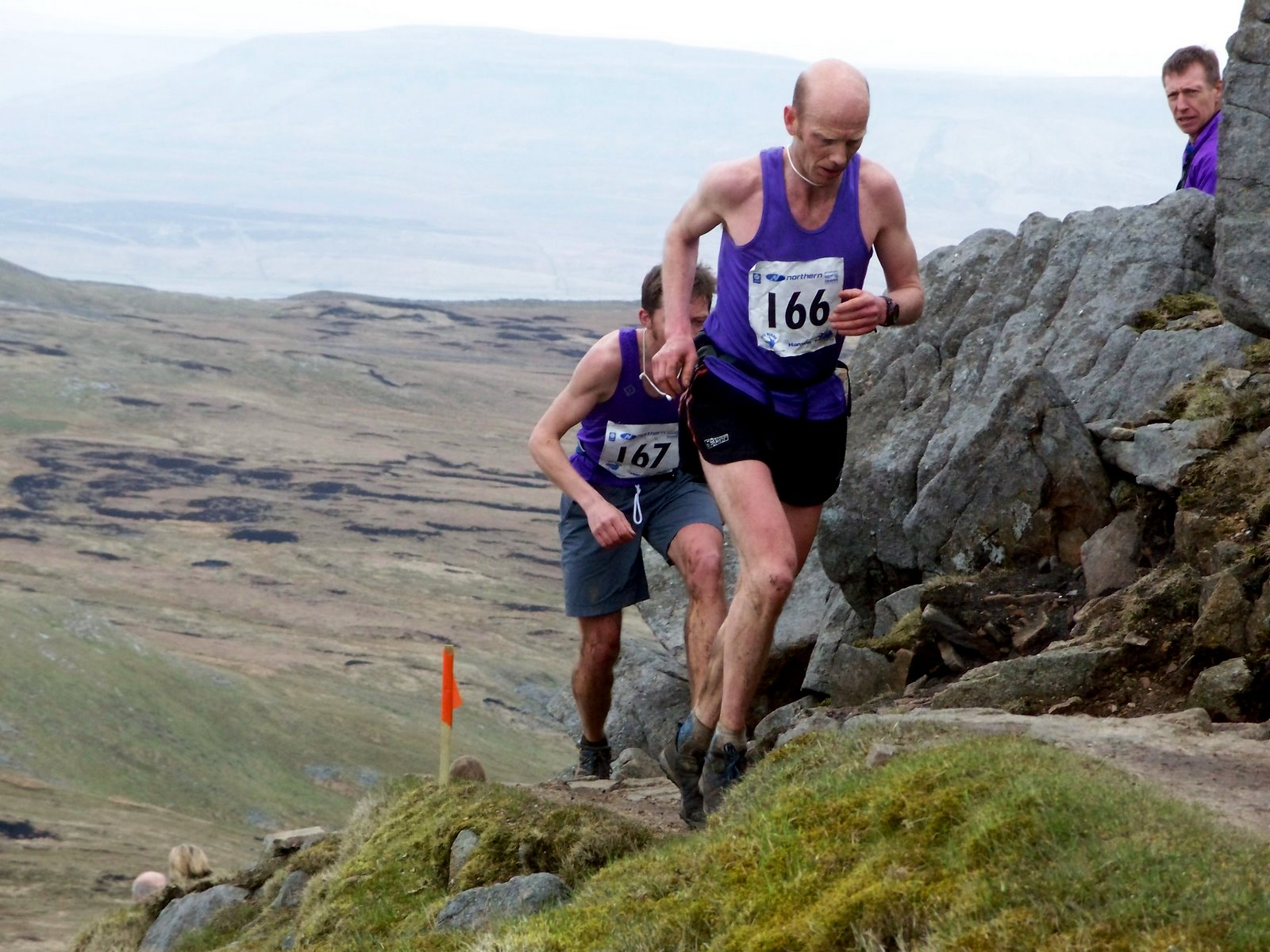
Three Peaks Race 2008

The Three Peaks Race is a fell race held annually on the last weekend in April, starting and finishing in Horton in Ribblesdale. The course traverses the Yorkshire Three Peaks. The present distance is about 23 miles (37 km).

The first known circuits undertaken by athletes, as distinct from walkers, were not made until the winter of 1948/49. Three Leeds climbers, Des Birch, Jack Bloor and Arthur Dolphin, who were also members of Harehills Harriers, completed the course in times varying from 4:27 to 5:20, with Des Birch setting the first record at 4:27.

The first race was organised by Preston Harriers and took place in 1954 and it was thought that there was a good chance of Des Birch's time being beaten. The conditions for the race were reasonably good but with a strong easterly wind making it feel cold. The start was at the Hill Inn, Chapel-le-Dale, with six runners taking part. Ingleborough was climbed first, where the competitors were bunched together after 27 minutes, followed by Pen-y-ghent which was reached by the leader Fred Bagley in 1:48, one minute ahead of Stan Bradshaw. At the summit of the final peak, Whernside, Bagley's time of 3:28 gave him a lead of 12 minutes over Bradshaw, and the former returned to the Hill Inn with a total time of 3:48. Bradshaw finished in 4:06 and the third finisher was Alf Case in 5:02.

From 1964 onwards, the event was organised by the Three Peaks Race Association and in 1975 the race venue was transferred from Chapel-le-Dale to Horton in Ribblesdale.

The shortest time for completion of any version of the race is 2:29:53, set by Jeff Norman in 1974. However, the route has changed multiple times since then. The most significant alterations, in each case leading to a longer or a more difficult course and necessitating new course records, were made in 1975, 1983, 1987 and 2023.

In 1981 the race was postponed due to heavy snowfall and took place in October. The 2001 edition was cancelled due to an outbreak of foot-and-mouth disease. The 2020 race was cancelled and the 2021 edition postponed due to the COVID-19 pandemic.

The 5th World Long Distance Mountain Running Challenge was incorporated into the 2008 race. A women's race has been run since 1979.

== Winners ==
Date	Men	Time	Women	Time
25 April 2026	Tom Evans	3:02:17	Helen Leigh	3:49:13
26 April 2025	Ben Rothery	3:00:00	Nichola Jackson	3:45:55
27 April 2024	Grant Cunliffe	3:08:50	Holly Wootten	3:34:36
29 April 2023	Thomas Roach	2:53:28	Catherine Taylor	3:34:44
30 April 2022	Brennan Townshend -2-	2:55:34	Sarah McCormack	3:23:21
9 October 2021	Garry Greenhow	3:05:22	Rose Mather	3:47:38
2020	Cancelled due to the COVID-19 pandemic			
27 April 2019	Brennan Townshend	2:50:22	Victoria Wilkinson -5-	3:20:01
28 April 2018	Tom Owens -2-	2:49:08	Victoria Wilkinson -4-	3:22:17
29 April 2017	Murray Strain	2:49:38	Victoria Wilkinson -3-	3:09:19
30 April 2016	Marc Lauenstein	2:48:58	Victoria Wilkinson -2-	3:26:47
25 April 2015	Ricky Lightfoot -2-	2:51:42	Helen Bonsor	3:27:24
26 April 2014	Ricky Lightfoot	2:53:16	Victoria Wilkinson	3:21:32
27 April 2013	Joe Symonds -2-	2:54:39	Jasmin Paris	3:33:04
28 April 2012	Joe Symonds	2:55:58	Sarah O'Neil	3:28:46
30 April 2011	Tom Owens	2:53:34	Anna Frost	3:30:00
24 April 2010	Morgan Donnelly	3:02:34	Anna Lupton -2-	3:30:45
25 April 2009	Rob Jebb -4-	2:54:53	Anna Lupton	3:36:31
26 April 2008	Jethro Lennox	2:53:39	Anna Pichrtová	3:14:43
29 April 2007	Rob Jebb -3-	2:51:49	Mary Wilkinson	3:30:22
30 April 2006	Rob Jebb -2-	2:54:15	Helen Sedgwick	3:43:40
24 April 2005	Rob Jebb	2:57:50	Sally Malir	3:59:56
25 April 2004	Andy Peace -4-	2:55:46	Louise Sharp	3:39:49
27 April 2003	David Walker	3:06:27	Beverley Whitfield	3:56:40
28 April 2002	Simon Booth -2-	3:10:43	Tracey Brindley	3:46:12
2001	Cancelled due to foot-and-mouth outbreak			
30 April 2000	Simon Booth	2:52:43	Sally Newman	3:38:11
25 April 1999	Mark Croasdale	3:04:48	Angela Mudge	3:20:17
26 April 1998	Mark Roberts	3:03:31	Carol Greenwood -3-	3:34:16
27 April 1997	Ian Holmes	2:52:28	Carol Greenwood -2-	3:34:39
28 April 1996	Andy Peace -3-	2:46:03	Sarah Rowell -4-	3:16:17
30 April 1995	Andy Peace -2-	2:52:52	Jean Rawlinson	3:48:40
24 April 1994	Andy Peace	2:56:52	Sarah Rowell -3-	3:21:50
25 April 1993	Gavin Bland	3:05:17	Carol Greenwood	3:39:50
26 April 1992	Ian Ferguson -3-	3:01:11	Sarah Rowell -2-	3:19:11
28 April 1991	Ian Ferguson -2-	2:51:41	Sarah Rowell	3:16:29
29 April 1990	Gary Devine	3:00:51	Ruth Pickvance	3:44:18
30 April 1989	Shaun Livesey -2-	2:51:45	Vanessa Brindle -4-	3:32:43
24 April 1988	Ian Ferguson	2:57:29	Vanessa Brindle -3-	3:37:16
26 April 1987	Hugh Symonds -3-	3:00:01	Vanessa Brindle -2-	3:44:05
27 April 1986	Shaun Livesey	2:56:40	Carol Walkington -2-	3:49:12
28 April 1985	Hugh Symonds -2-	2:49:13	Vanessa Brindle	3:38:10
29 April 1984	Hugh Symonds	2:50:34	Bridget Hogge	3:41:00
24 April 1983	Kenny Stuart	2:53:34	Carol Walkington & Wendy Dodds	4:08:01
25 April 1982	John Wild	2:37:30	Jane Robson	3:40:54
11 October 1981	Harry Walker -3-	2:56:34	Fiona Hinde	3:59:16
27 April 1980	Mike Short	2:43:32	Sue Parkin	3:35:34
29 April 1979	Harry Walker -2-	2:53:11	Jean Lochhead	3:43:12
30 April 1978	Harry Walker	2:43:34	---	---
24 April 1977	John Calvert -2-	2:51:04	---	---
25 April 1976	John Calvert	2:43:59	---	---
27 April 1975	Jeff Norman -6-	2:41:37	---	---
28 April 1974	Jeff Norman -5-	2:29:53	---	---
29 April 1973	Jeff Norman -4-	2:31:58	---	---
30 April 1972	Jeff Norman -3-	2:36:27	---	---
25 April 1971	Jeff Norman -2-	2:36:26	---	---
26 April 1970	Jeff Norman	2:48:11	---	---
27 April 1969	Colin Robinson	2:44:44	---	---
28 April 1968	Mike Davies -4-	2:40:34	---	---
30 April 1967	Mike Davies -3-	2:47:19	---	---
24 April 1966	Mike Davies -2-	2:53:22	---	---
25 April 1965	Mike Davies	2:47:00	---	---
26 April 1964	Peter Hall	2:53:00	---	---
28 April 1963	Dennis Hopkinson	3:18:37	---	---
29 April 1962	Geoff Hodgson -2-	3:00:07	---	---
30 April 1961	Geoff Hodgson	3:05:10	---	---
24 April 1960	Frank Dawson -2-	2:58:53	---	---
26 April 1959	Frank Dawson	3:13:25	---	---
27 April 1958	George Brass -2-	3:08:25	---	---
28 April 1957	Peter Dugdale	3:33:50	---	---
29 April 1956	Jack Bloor	3:33:15	---	---
24 April 1955	George Brass	3:28:45	---	---
24 April 1954	Fred Bagley	3:48:00	---	---
