= Ian Holmes (runner) =

English fell runner

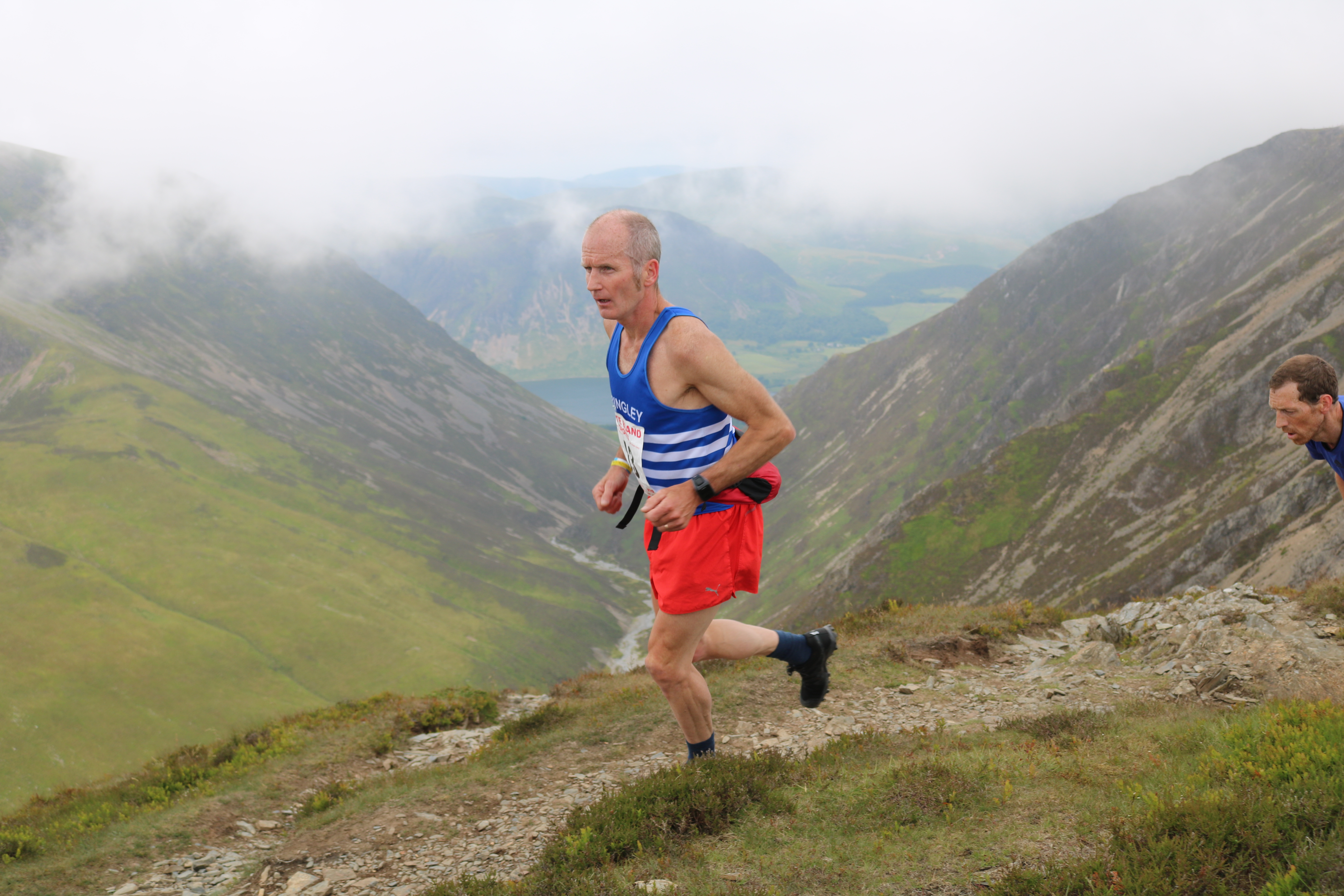

Personal information
- Full name: Ian Holmes
- Nationality: British
- Born: 4 December 1965 (age 60)

Ian Holmes (born 4 December 1965) is an English fell runner who was the national champion several times in the 1990s and 2000s and represented his country at the World Trophy and European Trophy.

At school, Holmes played rugby, but after a back injury, his running became a priority. In the early 1990s, he spent some time as a ski instructor near Bolzano and his training there significantly improved his fitness.

Returning to England, Holmes settled in Keighley and began racing regularly on the fells. He first represented England at the 1992 World Trophy. He was selected for some of the later World Trophies and also ran at the European Trophy. Among other international races, Holmes won the Mount Kinabalu Climbathon in record time in 1998 and returned to win again the following year when he held off Simon Booth in a close finish.

On the domestic scene, one of Holmes's significant victories early in his career was at Ben Nevis in poor weather in 1994. He went on to win many other fell races, including the Three Peaks Race, Burnsall, Borrowdale, Jura and Snowdon. Sarah Rowell wrote about Holmes's descending ability, noting that he often won races despite being some way behind the leaders at the highest point.

Running for Bingley Harriers, Holmes won both the British and English Fell Running Championships in 1996, reportedly saying afterwards, "The serious stuff's over now, though - everything from now on will be for fun!". This was followed by further British titles in 1997, 1998 and 2000, and English titles in 1998, 2000, 2002 and 2003.

He has won the Coniston Fell Race ten times.

In his local area, Holmes consistently won races from Penistone Hill for many years, winning the Stoop every year from 1991 to 2000 and the Auld Lang Syne race every year from 1994 to 2003, and had one of the longest runs of consecutive victories in the history of the sport at the Stanbury Splash, winning every year from 1996 to 2010.
