= Ben Nevis Race =

Mountain running competition

- Date: September
- Location: Ben Nevis, Lochaber, Scotland
- Event type: Mountain
- Distance: 14 km
- Established: 1895
- Course records: 1:25:34 (M), 1:43:01 (F)
- Website: www.bennevisrace.co.uk

The Ben Nevis Race is a mountain race that takes place annually, from the foot of Ben Nevis (highest mountain in the British Isles) to the top, then back again. The course is 14 km long and includes around 1,340 metres of ascent. Up to six hundred people may compete in the event.

== History ==
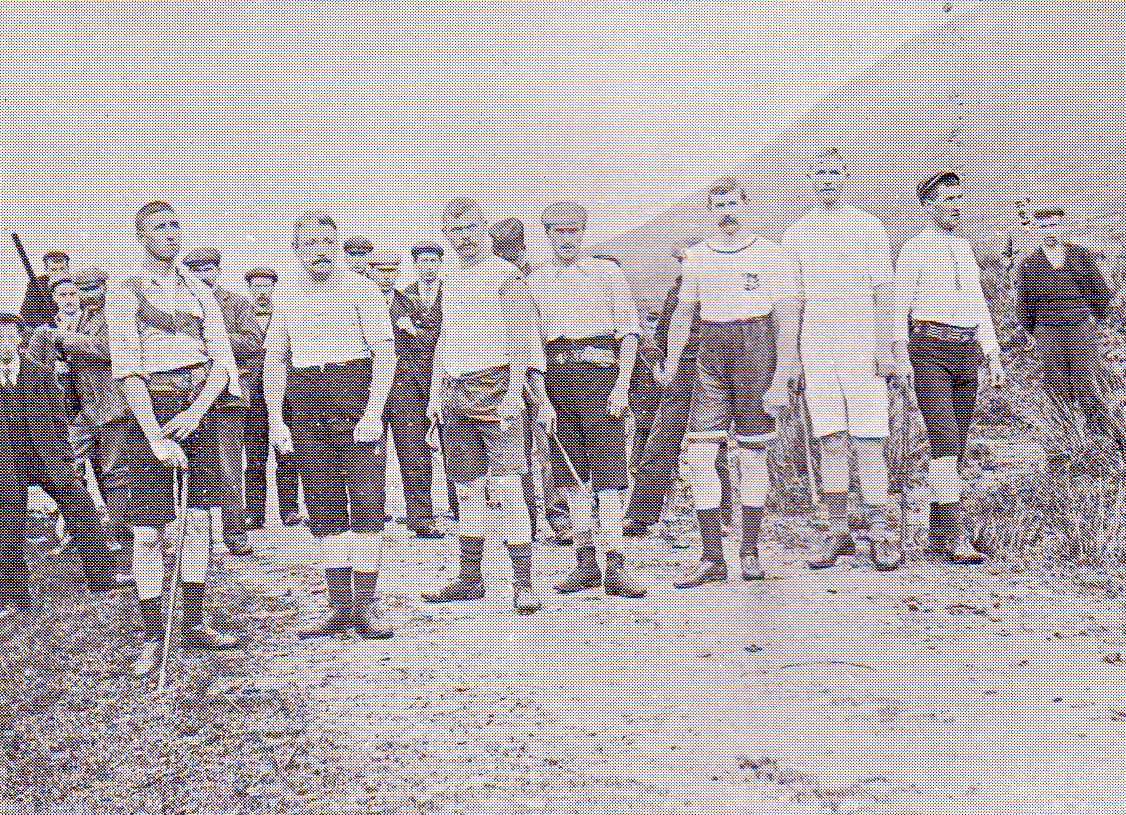
Runners line up for an early Ben Race. The starter is on left with a shotgun

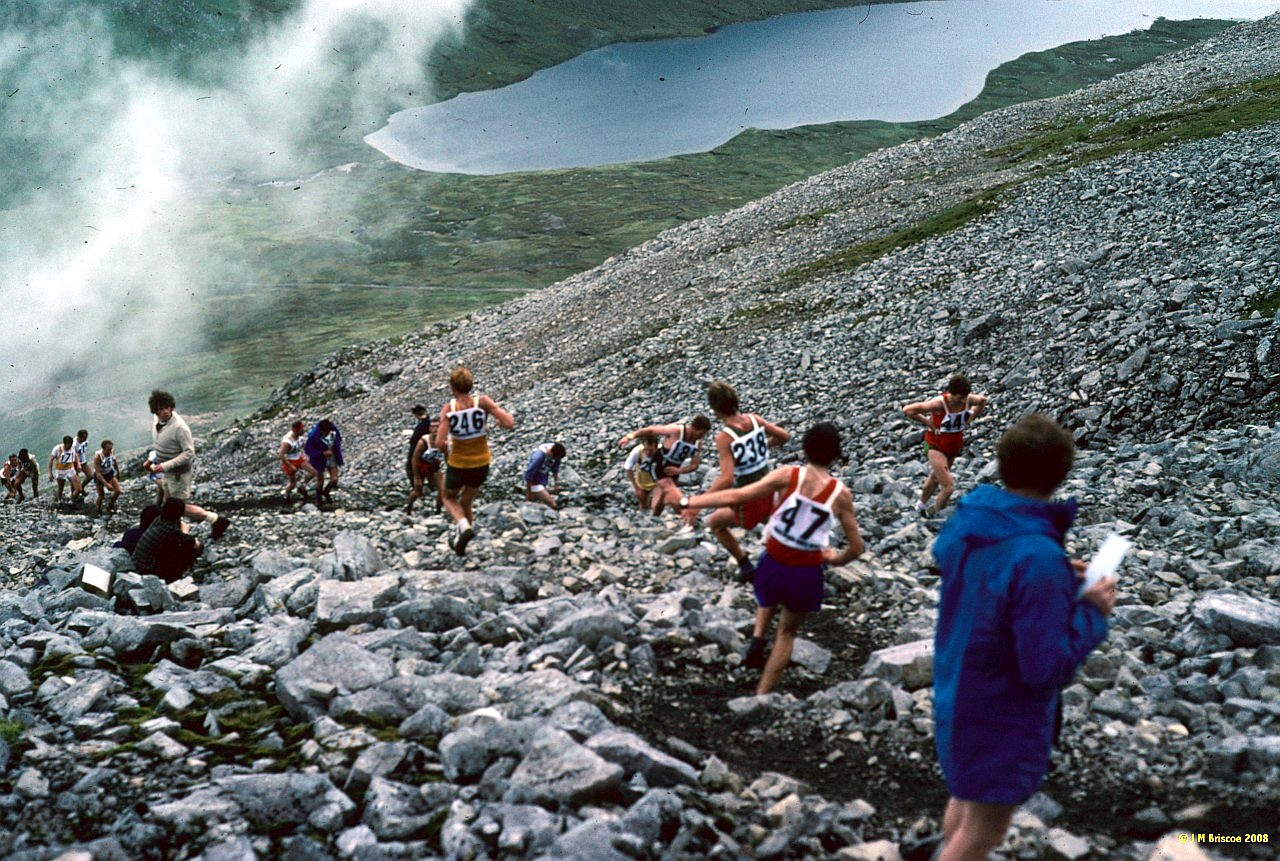
1979 Ben Nevis Race

The first timed event on Ben Nevis was in 1895. William Swan, a barber from Fort William, made the first recorded timed ascent up the mountain on or around 27 September of that year, when he ran from the old post office in Fort William to the summit and back in 2 hours 41 minutes. The following years saw several improvements on Swan's record, but the first competitive race was held on 3 June 1898 under Scottish Amateur Athletic Association rules. Ten competitors ran the course, which started at the Lochiel Arms Hotel in Banavie and was thus longer than the route from Fort William; the winner was 21-year-old Hugh Kennedy, a gamekeeper at Tor Castle, who finished (coincidentally with Swan's original run) in 2 hours 41 minutes.

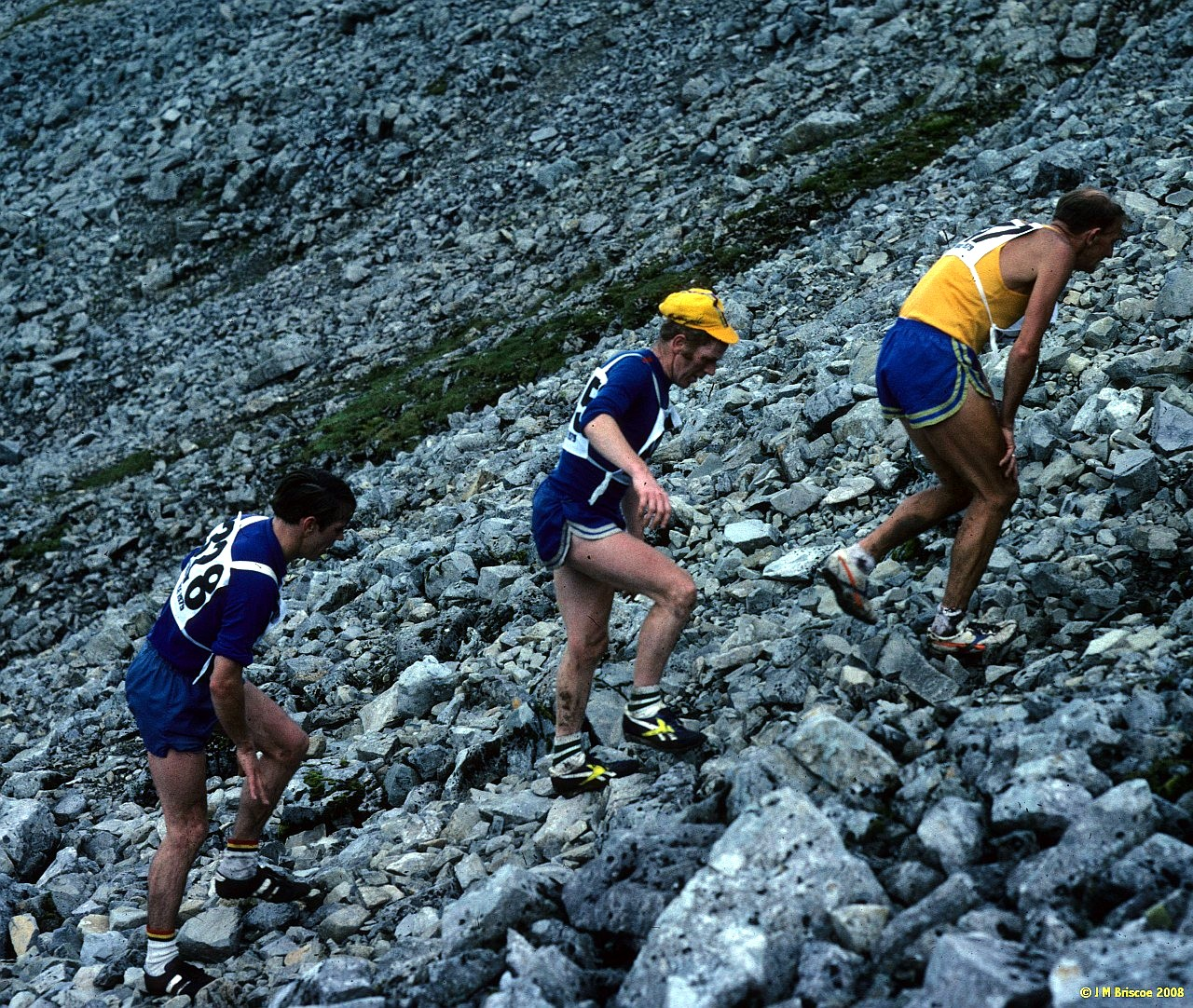
1979 Ben Nevis Race

Regular races were organised until 1903, when two events were held; these were the last for 24 years, perhaps due to the closure of the summit observatory the following year. The first was from Achintee, at the foot of the Pony Track, and finished at the summit; It was won in just over an hour by Ewen MacKenzie, the observatory roadman. The second race ran from new Fort William post office, and MacKenzie lowered the record to 2 hours 10 minutes, a record he held for 34 years.

The Ben Nevis Race has been run in its current form since 1937. It now takes place on the first Saturday in September every year. It starts and finishes at the Claggan Park football ground on the outskirts of Fort William, and is 14 kilometres (8.7 mi) long with 1,340 metres (4,400 ft) of ascent.

In 1955, Kathleen Connochie, was the first woman to finish the course.

== Rules ==
Due to the seriousness of the mountain environment, entry is restricted to those who have completed three category A hill races, and runners must carry waterproofs, a hat, gloves and a whistle; anyone who has not reached the summit after two hours is turned back.

In 2014 only 600 competitors were allowed to take part, with the limit being set for safety reasons.

In 2016, competitors were asked to stay off the area known as the Grassy Bank, after Scottish Natural Heritage contacted race organisers with concerns about erosion in that area.

== Results ==
Fort William taxi driver Eddie Campbell won the race three times, the first in 1952.

The men's course record was set in 1984, when Kenny Stuart of Keswick Athletic Club won the race with a time of 1:25:34. The women's record is 1:43:01, set by Victoria Wilkinson in 2018.

As of 2016 there are one hundred people who have completed at least 21 of the races, each of these athletes has been presented with a Connochie Silver Plaque.

In 2019, Finlay Wild won the race for a tenth consecutive year.

The winners of the race have been as follows.

| Year | Men | Time | Women | Time |
|---|---|---|---|---|
| 2025 | Sasha Chepelin | 1:38:04 | Eve Pannone | 2:00:56 |
| 2024 | Alistair Thornton | 1:51:47 | Eve Pannone | 2:05:25 |
| 2023 | Finlay Wild | 1:35:26 | Rose Mather | 1:59:52 |
| 2022 | Finlay Wild | 1:28:15 | Sharon Taylor | 2:00:10 |
| 2021 | Cancelled due to the COVID-19 pandemic | | | |
| 2020 | Cancelled due to the COVID-19 pandemic | | | |
| 2019 | Finlay Wild | 1:32:05 | Sarah Graham | 2:12:21 |
| 2018 | Finlay Wild | 1:27:35 | Victoria Wilkinson | 1:43:01 |
| 2017 | Finlay Wild | 1:31:37 | Diane Wilson | 2:01:21 |
| 2016 | Finlay Wild | 1:28:45 | Sophie Horrocks | 1:56:20 |
| 2015 | Finlay Wild | 1:30:56 | Diane Wilson | 2:00:41 |
| 2014 | Finlay Wild | 1:34:43 | Lindsey Brindle | 1:56:36 |
| 2013 | Finlay Wild | 1:30:06 | Angela Mudge | 1:52:40 |
| 2012 | Finlay Wild | 1:29:56 | Sharon Taylor | 1:59:23 |
| 2011 | Finlay Wild | 1:29:21 | Angela Mudge | 1:51:14 |
| 2010 | Finlay Wild | 1:35:39 | Cecilia Mora | 1:56:01 |
| 2009 | Rob Jebb | 1:32:33 | Mireia Miró Varela | 1:56:46 |
| 2008 | Agustí Roc Amador | 1:29:12 | Angela Mudge | 1:47:12 |
| 2007 | Ian Holmes | 1:32:57 | Angela Mudge | 1:48:28 |
| 2006 | Rob Jebb | 1:29:31 | Sharon Taylor | 1:57:10 |
| 2005 | Rob Jebb | 1:29:22 | Sharon Taylor | 1:58:15 |
| 2004 | Ian Holmes | 1:29:33 | Sharon Taylor | 1:55:54 |
| 2003 | Rob Jebb | 1:29:32 | Kate Beaty | 1:54:52 |
| 2002 | Andrew Peace | 1:29:41 | Andrea Priestley | 1:52:55 |
| 2001 | David Rodgers | 1:29:24 | Tracey Ambler | 1:54:36 |
| 2000 | Ian Holmes | 1:28:47 | Sarah Rowell | 1:54:31 |
| 1999 | Ian Holmes | 1:28:14 | Margaret Creber | 1:59:21 |
| 1998 | John Brooks | 1:27:24 | Kate Beaty | 2:09:56 |
| 1997 | Gavin Bland | 1:27:45 | Angela Brand-Barker | 1:56:27 |
| 1996 | David Rodgers | 1:31:23 | Angela Mudge | 2:03:08 |
| 1995 | Ian Holmes | 1:28:08 | Ros Evans | 2:02:07 |
| 1994 | Ian Holmes | 1:30:17 | Gill Barnes | 2:13:22 |
| 1993 | Graeme Bartlett | 1:33:38 | Julie Farmer | 2:02:18 |
| 1992 | Gavin Bland | 1:27:02 | Carol Greenwood | 1:53:25 |
| 1991 | David Rodgers | 1:33:23 | Ros Evans | 2:03:57 |
| 1990 | Mark Rigby | 1:26:08 | Lesley Hope | 1:56:58 |
| 1989 | Keith Anderson | 1:27:41 | Beverley Redfern | 2:03:10 |
| 1988 | Gary Devine | 1:30:10 | Sara Taylor | 2:05:23 |
| 1987 | Michael Lindsay | 1:29:25 | Angela Carson | 1:52:57 |
| 1986 | Colin Donnelly | 1:25:48 | Angela Carson | 1:47:51 |
| 1985 | Hugh Symonds | 1:28:00 | Angela Carson | 1:52:45 |
| 1984 | Kenny Stuart | 1:25:34 | Pauline Haworth | 1:43:25 |
| 1983 | John Wild | 1:25:35 | Ros Coats | 1:45:17 |
| 1982 | Kenny Stuart | 1:27:12 | Ros Coats | 1:49:22 |
| 1981 | Bob Whitfield | 1:26:57 | Ros Coats | 1:44:25 |
| 1980 | Cancelled | --- | Cancelled | --- |
| 1979 | Colin Donnelly | 1:31:26 | Ros Coats | 1:56:11 |
| 1978 | Billy Bland | 1:26:56 | Ros Coats | 1:53:23 |
| 1977 | Alan McGee | 1:29:56 | Joan Glass | 2:07:00 |
| 1976 | Dave Cannon | 1:26:55 | | |
| 1975 | Dave Cannon | 1:29:58 | | |
| 1974 | Dave Cannon | 1:30:17 | | |
| 1973 | Harry Walker | 1:29:38 | | |
| 1972 | David Cannon | 1:32:57 | | |
| 1971 | David Cannon | 1:33:05 | | |
| 1970 | Jeff Norman | 1:40:45 | | |
| 1969 | Mike Davies | 1:43:25 | | |
| 1968 | Mike Davies | 1:39:29 | | |
| 1967 | Bobby Shields | 1:41:11 | | |
| 1966 | Allan McRae | 1:43:39 | | |
| 1965 | Peter Hall | 1:42:19 | | |
| 1964 | Peter Hall | 1:38:50 | | |
| 1963 | Peter Hall | 1:41:45 | | |
| 1962 | Peter Hall | 1:45:44 | | |
| 1961 | Mike Davies | 1:47:56 | | |
| 1960 | Dave Spencer | 1:52:22 | | |
| 1959 | Dave Spencer | 1:47:53 | | |
| 1958 | Dave Spencer | 1:46:08 | | |
| 1957 | Brian Kearney | 1:46:04 | | |
| 1956 | Pat Moy | 1:45:56 | | |
| 1955 | Eddie Campbell | 1:50:05 | Kathleen Connochie | 3:02:00 |
| 1954 | Brian Kearney | 1:47:04 | | |
| 1953 | Eddie Campbell | 1:53:18 | | |
| 1952 | Eddie Campbell | 1:53:46 | | |
| 1951 | Brian Kearney | 1:51:18 | | |
| 1944 | Charles Wilson | 2:14:19 | | |
| 1943 | Duncan McIntyre | 2:04:30 | | |
| 1942 | Charles Wilson | 2:25:49 | | |
| 1939 | Daniel Mulholland | 2:03:43 | | |
| 1938 | Charles Wilson | 2:13:30 | | |
| 1937 | Charles Wilson | 2:17:52 | | |
