= Sarah Rowell =

British long-distance runner (born 1962)

Personal information
- Nationality: British (English)
- Born: 19 November 1962 (age 63) Hostert, North Rhine-Westphalia, Germany
- Height: 162 cm (5 ft 4 in)
- Weight: 47 kg (104 lb)

Sport
- Sport: Athletics
- Event: long distance
- Club: Dartford Harriers
Medal record
Representing Great Britain
Summer Universiade
Gold medal – first place	1983 Edmonton	Marathon

Sarah Louise Rowell (born 19 November 1962) is a German born, British former long-distance runner who competed at the 1984 Summer Olympics.

== Biography ==
Born in Hostert, North Rhine-Westphalia, Germany, she ran 2:39:11 at the age of 20 at the 1983 London Marathon. Later that year she won the gold medal in the women's marathon at the 1983 Summer Universiade in Edmonton. Also in 1983, Rowell finished third behind Glynis Penny in the marathon event at the 1983 WAAA Championships.

At the 1984 London marathon she improved her best to 2:31:28 to qualify for the British team for the 1984 Los Angeles Olympics. In the inaugural women's Olympic marathon, she finished 14th. At the 1984 WAAA Championships, Rowell second behind finished Priscilla Welch.

Rowell broke the British record when running her personal best for the marathon with 2:28:06, when finishing second behind Ingrid Kristiansen at the 1985 London Marathon. Rowell also became British marathon champion after winning the British WAAA Championships title at the 1985 WAAA Championships.

Later in her running career, Rowell was a prominent fell runner, winning the Three Peaks Race four times, the Fellsman three times, as well as Wasdale, Borrowdale and Ben Nevis. She finished second in the 1992 World Mountain Running Trophy and won both the British and English Fell Running Championships in 1995 and 1996.

== Achievements ==
Year	Competition	Venue	Position	Event	Notes
Representing Great Britain / England
1982	London Marathon	London, United Kingdom	23rd	Marathon	2:54:29
1983	Reading Half Marathon	Reading, United Kingdom	1st	Half marathon	1:16:00
1983	London Marathon	London, United Kingdom	9th	Marathon	2:39:11
1983	World Student Games (Universiade)	Edmonton, Canada	1st	Marathon	2:47:37
1983	New York City Marathon	New York City, United States	14th	Marathon	2:40:52
1984	London Marathon	London, United Kingdom	3rd	Marathon	2:31:28
1984	Olympic Games	Los Angeles, United States	14th	Marathon	2:34:08
1985	London Marathon	London, United Kingdom	2nd	Marathon	2:28:06
1985	Columbus Marathon	Columbus, Ohio, United States	3rd	Marathon	2:36:39
1990	World Mountain Running Trophy	Telfes, Austria	5th	Fell Running	38:15
1992	World Mountain Running Trophy	Susa Valley, Italy	2nd	Fell running	40:37
1993	World Mountain Running Trophy	Gap, Hautes-Alpes	6th	Fell Running	38:32
1995	World Mountain Running Trophy	Edinburgh, United Kingdom	12th	Fell Running	40:06
1996	European Mountain Running Trophy	Llanberis, United Kingdom	4th	Fell Running	54:36
