= Lakeland Shows =

Lakeland Shows are agricultural and sporting shows in the English Lake District.

They have an emphasis on showing sheep, cattle and poultry, and are known for the Herdwick Sheep.

Sports events include Cumberland and Westmorland wrestling and fell running.

While the Westmorland County Show claims to be "one of the largest one day Shows in the Country", Lakeland shows are often on a smaller scale than other agricultural shows. They are held in summer or early autumn.

Shows include:

- Cumberland Show (July)
- Westmorland County Show (second Thursday in September)
- Grasmere Show (late August)
- Cockermouth Show (early August)
- Loweswater Show (early September)
- Wasdale Show
- Eskdale Show (last Saturday in September)
- Borrowdale Shepherds meet and Show (mid-September)
- Egremont Crab Fair (September)
