= Ros Evans =

British athlete

Ros Evans (née Coats, 17 January 1950 – 31 August 2024) was a British athlete who competed in fell running, orienteering, ski-orienteering and cross-country skiing. She was also mother to British track cyclist, Neah Evans.

== Life ==
Evans was born at Langbank, Renfrewshire. Her first outdoor pursuits were mountaineering and rock climbing. In order to improve her fitness for these activities, she began running in 1976 while at Jordanhill College where she underwent teacher training. She also began orienteering at around the same time.

As a runner, Evans won the British Fell Running Championships in 1979 and 1981, and in 1979, she set a ladies’ record for the Bob Graham Round with a time of 20:31. She has won the Ben Nevis Race seven times, more than any other woman. Among her other fell race victories were Ben Lomond, the Langdale Horseshoe, Sedbergh Hills, Borrowdale, the Fairfield Horseshoe, the Kentmere Horseshoe, Pendle, and the Snowdon Race. She still holds the female record for the Cow Hill Race from Fort William.

Evans was a Scottish Orienteering Champion and represented Great Britain in the World Orienteering Championships in 1985. She was a winner of the navigational Lake District Mountain Trial and, together with Anne-Marie Grindley, was in the first female team to complete the elite course of the Karrimor International Mountain Marathon.

Evans competed in the World Ski Orienteering Championships and was selected to represent Great Britain in cross-country skiing at the 1984 Winter Olympics where she participated in the 5 km, 10 km, 20 km and 4 x 5 km relay events.

She died on 31 August 2024.

== Private life ==
Evans lived in Aberdeenshire with her husband, Malcolm Evans. One of their three children is Neah Evans who is a track cyclist and Olympian.
