= Blackbeck Tarn =

Lake in Cumbria, England

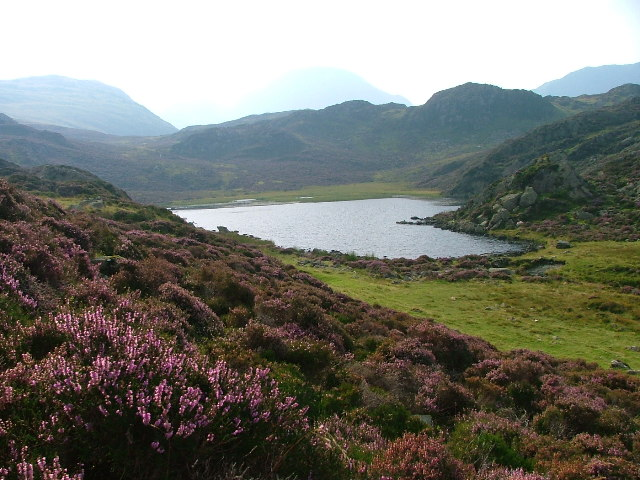

- Location in the Lake District National Park Location in Allerdale, Cumbria
- Location: Lake District, Cumbria
- Coordinates: 54°30′15″N 3°14′2″W
- Type: Tarn
- Basin countries: United Kingdom
- Max. length: 183 m (600 ft)
- Max. width: 80 m (260 ft)
- Surface area: 0.95 hectares (2.3 acres)
- Max. depth: 2.5 m (8.2 ft)
- Surface elevation: 486 m (1,594 ft)

Blackbeck Tarn is a small tarn in Cumbria, England, situated near the summit of Haystacks in the Buttermere Valley. At an elevation of 486 m (1,594 ft), the lake has an area of 0.95 hectares (2.3 acres) and measures 183 m × 80 m (600 ft × 262 ft), with a maximum depth of 2.5 m (8.2 ft).

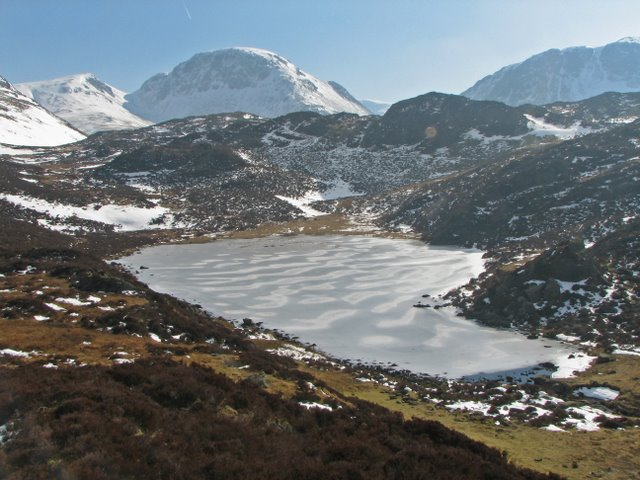

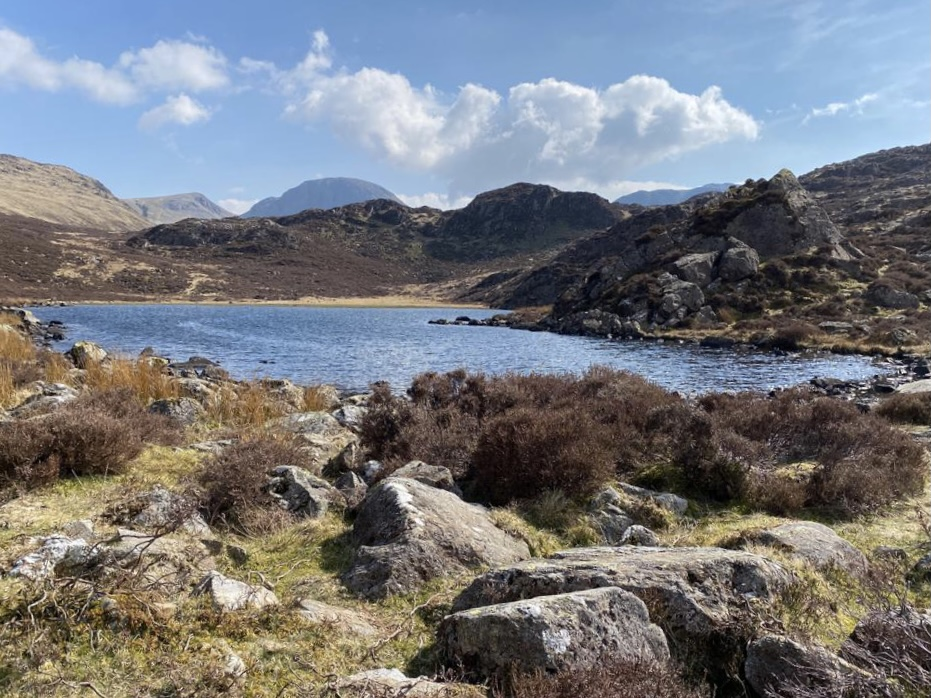
