= Rob Hope (runner) =

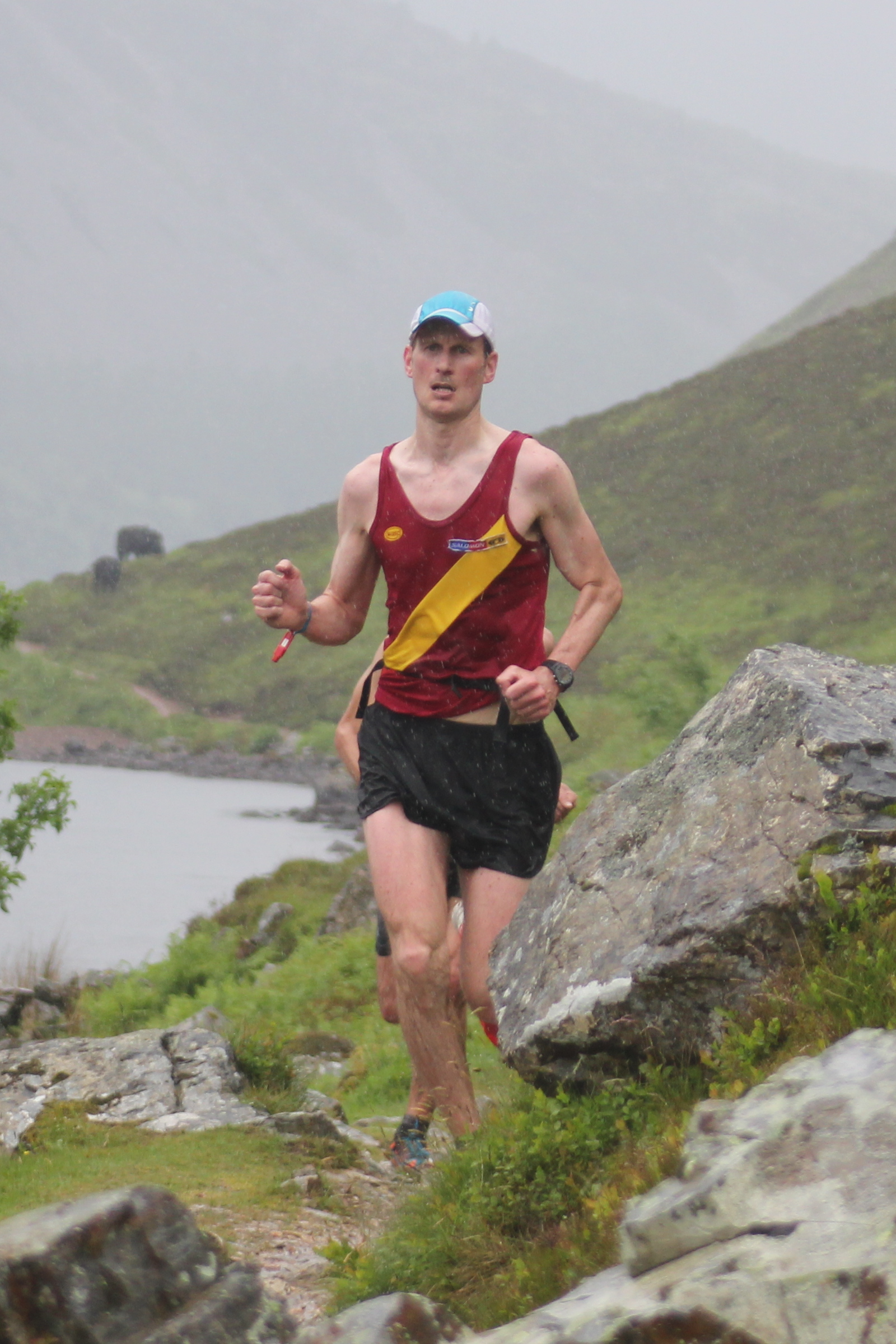

Personal information
- Full name: Rob Hope
- Nationality: British
- Born: 3 June 1974 (age 52)

Robert Hope (born 3 June 1974) is an English runner who has been a national fell running champion several times and who has represented his country at the World Mountain Running Trophy.

Hope had some success in fell running as a junior athlete, being the English champion in the under-20 age group in 1994. The next year, he won his local race, Rivington Pike, where he went on to be victorious several more times in later years.

He was runner-up to Ian Holmes in the 2002 English Fell Running Championships and had a noteworthy set of victories at Burnsall, Grasmere and Kilnsey that year, winning all three races within four days. He was joint winner (with Simon Bailey) in the English Championships in 2005 due in part to his triumph in the last race of the series at the Langdale Horseshoe immediately after returning from the World Mountain Running Trophy in New Zealand.

Hope was the English champion again in 2010 and he won the British Fell Running Championships in 2007, 2008, 2009 and 2014.

Hope represented his country in several editions of the World Mountain Running Trophy, finishing 30th in the 2007 race. He also ran in the European Mountain Running Championships, finishing 27th in 2008.
