= Pauline Stuart =

British fell runner

Pauline Stuart (née Cushnie; born 1 August 1956) is a former pioneer female fell runner, being the first woman to win many of the classic fell races in the late 1970s and early 1980s, some as soon as they allowed women to enter.

== Early life ==
Stuart was born in Northampton but raised in Southport. She left school at eighteen and began training as a nurse, but moved on to go to work for the Youth Hostels Association (YHA). She had been inspired by seeing Joss Naylor out running on the fells when she worked at the YHA at Wasdale.

== Running career ==
In 1979 a female Fell Runner of the Year contest was instigated, and Pauline was the winner of the second title in 1980. Stuart then had a couple of years of injuries and operations, including issues with a bunion and a heel spur.

She returned in 1984 for another attempt at the British Fell Championships (as it was now called), managing to win it that year and again in 1985, giving her three titles in total. In 1984 she won ten out of ten of her championship counters, sealing it with her win at the Ben Nevis Race.

Having split from her former husband Pete Haworth, she married her fellow fell running champion Kenny Stuart at the end of 1985. Pauline and Kenny swept all before them in 1984 and 1985, winning many doubles at races. Unusually, both the male and female British championships were retained in successive seasons.

Stuart won the Snowdon Race three times (in 1980, 1984 and 1985), setting a record each time. The 1985 Snowdon time (which has subsequently been beaten) was 1:20:29. Pauline had also set the course record for the Ben Nevis race on 1 September 1984, with a time of 1:43:25, which stood for 34 years before being broken by 24 seconds by Victoria Wilkinson in 2018.

She set new marks in the 1984 season at the fell races at Fairfield, Borrowdale, Latrigg (which lasted 21 years), Three Shires and Dunnerdale.

Stuart competed in the first World Cup of Mountain Running, in San Vigilio, Italy, in 1985, finishing ninth, despite feeling sick, not knowing that she was pregnant.
