= Keith Anderson (runner) =

British runner

Personal information
- Nationality: English
- Born: 10 August 1957 (age 68)

Sport
- Sport: Athletics

Keith Anderson (born 10 August 1957) is a male British former runner who was the national fell running champion and competed in the marathon at the Commonwealth Games.

== Athletics career ==
Anderson did not take up running until he was thirty, at which time he was overweight and had an unhealthy lifestyle. He made rapid progress and in 1989 won the Edale Skyline, Sedbergh Hills and Three Shires fell races. Also that year, he won the Ben Nevis Race, noting that losing three stones in weight had contributed greatly to his victory.

In 1991, Anderson won the British Fell Running Championships. He is popularly considered one of the best descenders in the history of the sport and an investigation of downhill running speeds found his sustained descent rate of 1.365 m/s in the 1990 Pen y Fan Race, when he descended 580m vertically in 7:05, to be the fastest recorded in any race for which relevant information was available.

He made more use of science and technology in his running than many of his contemporaries, basing his training around heart rate and often having his blood lactate levels tested. He also did many of his speed sessions on a treadmill in order to be able to complete them in a controlled environment.

Anderson’s focus later shifted to cross country and road running. In 1994, he finished fourth in the English National Cross Country Championships and he won the Scottish National Cross Country Championships in 1995, his father being Scots.

In one of his 5k road races in 1994, Anderson placed second to the future 3000m world record holder Daniel Komen. Anderson ran the 1998 Boston Marathon in 2:17:08 and was selected to represent England in Kuala Lumpur, Malaysia, in the marathon at the 1998 Commonwealth Games where he finished in tenth place at the age of forty-one.

After his retirement from high-level running, Anderson became involved in coaching the sport. He still holds the course records for the fell races at Pen y Fan, Sedbergh Hills, Dunnerdale and the Black Mountains, all set in the early 1990s.
