= British Fell Running Championships =

Annual running competition

The first British Fell Running Championships, then known as Fell Runner of the Year, were held in 1972 and the scoring was based on results in all fell races. In 1976 this was changed to the runner's best ten category A races and further changes took place to the format in later years. Starting with the 1986 season, an English Fell Running Championships series has also taken place, based on results in various races of different lengths over the year.

== Winners of British championships ==
The winners of the British Championships have been as follows.

Year	Men	Women	U23 Men	U23 Women
1972	Dave Cannon			
1973	Harry Walker			
1974	Jeff Norman			
1975	Mike Short			
1976	Martin Weeks			
1977	Alan McGee			
1978	Mike Short			
1979	Andy Styan	Ros Coats		
1980	Billy Bland	Pauline Haworth		
1981	John Wild	Ros Coats		
1982	John Wild	Sue Parkin		
1983	Kenny Stuart	Angela Carson		
1984	Kenny Stuart	Pauline Haworth		
1985	Kenny Stuart	Pauline Haworth		
1986	Jack Maitland	Angela Carson		
1987	Colin Donnelly	Jacky Smith		
1988	Colin Donnelly	Clare Crofts		
1989	Colin Donnelly	Ruth Pickvance		
1990	Gary Devine	Trish Calder		
1991	Keith Anderson	Trish Calder		
1992	Steve Hawkins	Clare Crofts		
1993	Mark Croasdale	Angela Brand-Barker		
1994	Mark Kinch	Angela Brand-Barker		
1995	Mark Kinch	Sarah Rowell		
1996	Ian Holmes	Sarah Rowell		
1997	Ian Holmes and Mark Roberts	Angela Mudge		
1998	Ian Holmes	Angela Mudge		
1999	Gavin Bland	Angela Mudge		
2000	Ian Holmes	Angela Mudge		
2001	Cancelled due to foot-and-mouth outbreak			
2002	Simon Booth	Andrea Priestley and Louise Sharp		
2003	Rob Jebb	Louise Sharp		
2004	Simon Bailey	Tracey Brindley		
2005	Simon Booth	Jill Mykura		
2006	Rob Jebb	Natalie White	Rob Little	Rachel Crowe
2007	Rob Hope	Janet McIver	Ricky Lightfoot	Emma Clayton
2008	Rob Hope	Angela Mudge	James kevan	Lucy Harris
2009	Rob Hope	Philippa Jackson	James Kevan	Emma Clayton
2010	Tim Davies	Philippa Maddams	Robbie Simpson	Emma Clayton and Lucy Harris
2011	Morgan Donnelly	Philippa Maddams	Andrew Annett	Lucy Harris
2012	Joe Symonds	~~Lauren Jeska~~*	William Neill	Emma Dodd
2013	Rob Jebb	Victoria Wilkinson and Helen Fines	Joseph Crossfield	Nichola Jackson and Caroline Lambert
2014	Rob Hope	Victoria Wilkinson and Jacqueline Lee	William Neill	Nichola Jackson
2015	Finlay Wild	Jasmin Paris	Tom Saville	Nichola Jackson
2016	Rhys Findlay-Robinson	Lou Roberts	Tom Saville	Bronwen Jenkinson
2017	Carl Bell and Chris Arthur	Bronwen Jenkinson	Joshua Jardine	Bronwen Jenkinson
2018	Sam Tosh	Jasmin Paris	Ross Gollan	Bronwen Jenkinson
2019	Carl Bell	Kelli Roberts	Max Wainwright	Hannah Russell
2020	Cancelled due to COVID-19			
2021	Chris Richards	Hannah Horsburgh	Tom Wood	Eve Pannone
2022	Finlay Wild	Eve Pannone	Harry Bolton	Eve Pannone
2023	Billy Cartwright	Nichola Jackson	Ben Sharrock	Alice Gamble

- All Jeska's athletics results were declared null and void when she failed to produce samples of her testosterone levels.
