= Victoria Wilkinson =

British runner

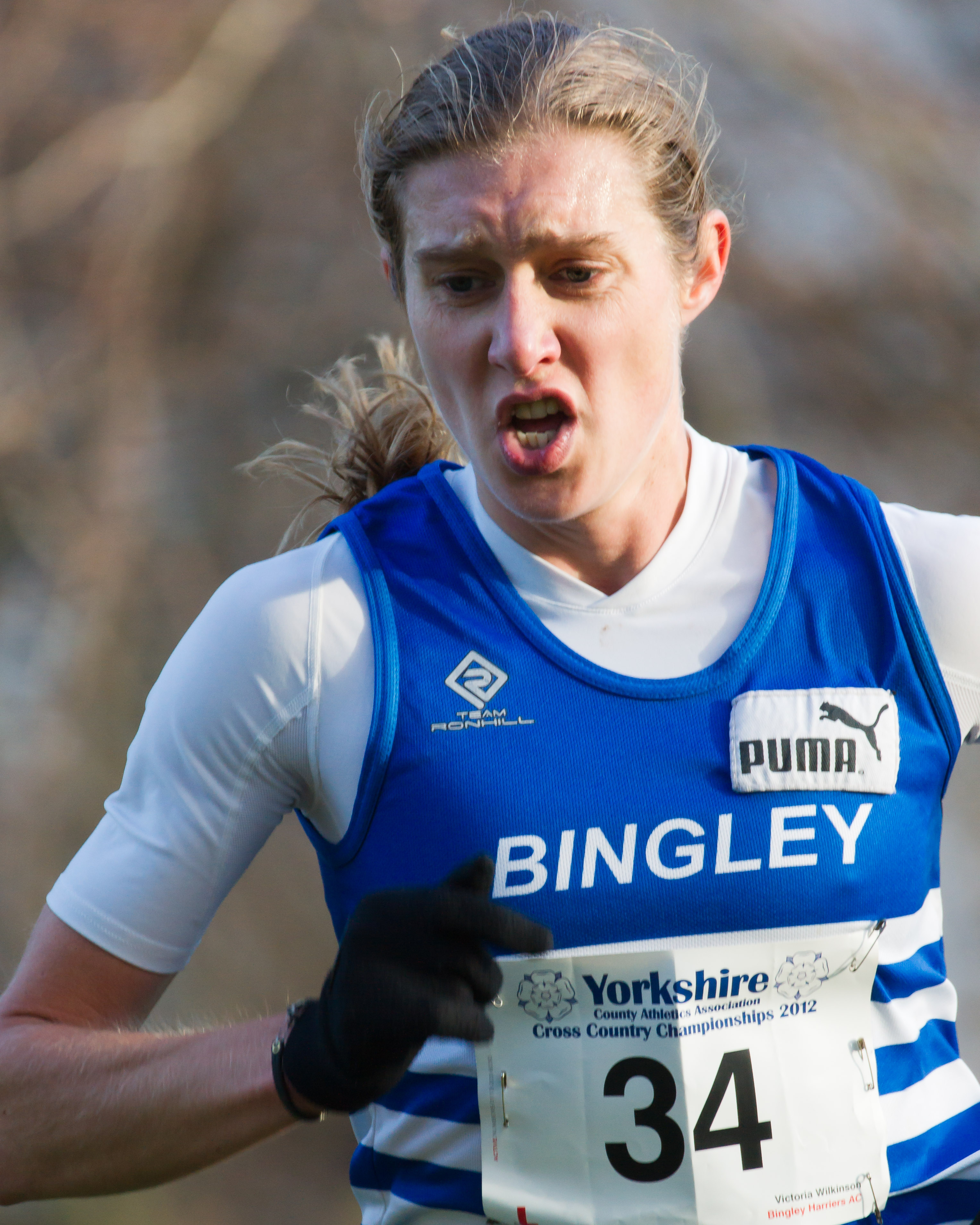

Personal information
- Full name: Victoria Wilkinson
- Nationality: British
- Born: 19 August 1978 (age 47)

Victoria Wilkinson (born 19 August 1978) is an English runner and cyclo-cross rider who was a world mountain running champion at junior level and who has several times been a national fell running champion as a senior athlete.

== Biography ==
Wilkinson displayed significant talent as a junior, winning national fell running titles at under-16 and under-18 level. She also finished second in the English Schools Cross Country Championships in 1996. At that time she was coached by her father Chris who was also a runner and cyclo-cross competitor who had won the Three Peaks Cyclo-Cross in 1972. Victoria was also advised by Keith Anderson and others. Her most notable result as a young athlete was victory in the junior race at the World Mountain Running Trophy in 1997.

A knee injury interrupted Wilkinson’s running career and she turned her attention to cyclo-cross, in which she competed at the World Championships. She was a winner of the national cyclo-cross series and had four consecutive second-place finishes in the British National Cyclo-cross Championships between 2002 and 2005. She finished fifth in the World Cup series race at St. Wendel in Germany in 2003. She also competed in cross country mountain biking at the 2002 Commonwealth Games, finishing in tenth place. Some years later, despite limited experience on the type of course, she won the Three Peaks Cyclo-Cross in 2012.

Around 2006, Wilkinson returned to more frequent racing as a runner. She has represented her country multiple times in both the World Mountain Running Championships and the European Mountain Running Championships. Her results in the global championships include eleventh place in both 2006 and 2016. At the European level, she was fifth in 2008 and sixth in 2015.

Wilkinson won the Šmarna Gora Race in Slovenia in 2007, the victory giving her enough points to finish second overall in the World Mountain Running Association Grand Prix that year. She competed at the Commonwealth Mountain Running Championships in 2009 and 2011, finishing fifth on both occasions.

She also raced cross country, finishing second in the UK Cross Challenge series in 2006-2007 and ninth at Cinque Mulini in 2009. In 2010, Wilkinson was first in the Yorkshire Cross Country Championships, second in the North of England Championships and fifth in the English National Championships.

In the 2010s, Wilkinson has been prominent in fell running. She was the inter-counties champion in 2010. She won the British Fell Running Championships in 2013 (jointly with Helen Fines) and 2014 (jointly with Jackie Lee) and the English Fell Running Championships in 2013 (jointly with Helen Fines), 2014, 2015, 2016 and 2017.

In 2014, Wilkinson won the Three Peaks Race, thereby becoming the first woman to win both the running and cyclo-cross versions of that event. In the running version, she set a new women's course record of 3:09:19 in the 2017 race.

She set a new record at the Tour of Pendle in 2017, taking thirteen minutes off the previous best women's time which had been set by Angela Mudge in 1997.

Wilkinson's victories in 2018 included a new fastest time at the Kentmere Horseshoe in July and a win at Burnsall in August where she broke the long-standing record which had been held by Carol Greenwood since 1983. Wilkinson followed this with a new record of 1:43:01 in the Ben Nevis Race and two weeks later earned the silver medal in the Ring of Steall Skyrace at the Skyrunning World Championships.

In 2022, Wilkinson won the over-40 category at the World Masters Mountain Running Championships.
