= Rob Jebb =

Medal record

Men's Mountain running
Gold medal – first place	2005 Skyrunner World Series	Champion of the year

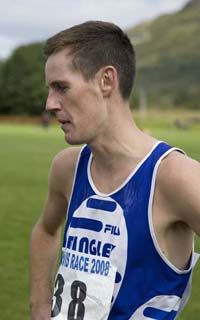
Rob Jebb, photographed after finishing second in the 2008 Ben Nevis Race, part of the Buff Skyrunner World Series.

Robert Jebb (born 28 February 1975 in Bingley) is an English fell runner, skyrunner, and cyclo-cross rider. He has won the annual Three Peaks Cyclo-Cross in the Yorkshire Dales a record thirteen times since 2000, is a four-time-winner of the Three Peaks Race in the same region and broke Catalan dominance in the Buff Skyrunner World Series when he became champion in 2005.

Jebb was encouraged to take up running by his father Peter who performed well in long races on rough terrain and won the Fellsman in 1981. Rob joined Bingley Harriers in 1984 and finished next-to-last in his first junior race at Buckden Pike. His results improved somewhat in the years following but he did not display outstanding ability as a youngster.

By 1998, Jebb had progressed well enough to finish sixth in the British Fell Running Championships and third in the English Championships. He also represented England that year at the Knockdhu International race and ran at the European Mountain Running Trophy in both 1999 and 2000. He has also run at the World Trophy.

Jebb won the British Fell Running Championships in 2003, 2006 and 2013 and the English Championships in 2006 and 2008. He has also won the Ben Nevis Race four times.

In July 2016, Jebb completed the Bob Graham Round in 14 hours 30 minutes, then the second-fastest round of all time and the first time any runner had come within an hour of Billy Bland's 1982 record of 13 hours 53 minutes.
