= English Fell Running Championships =

Annual running competition

The first English Fell Running Championships were held in the 1986 season, based on results in various fell races of different lengths over the year.

The winners have been as follows.

Year	Men	Women
1986	Dave Cartridge	Carol Haigh
1987	Bob Whitfield	Vanessa Brindle
1988	Shaun Livesey	Clare Crofts
1989	Gary Devine	Clare Crofts
1990	Shaun Livesey	Cheryl Cook
1991	Gavin Bland	Cheryl Cook
1992	Brian Thompson	Jacky Smith
1993	Mark Croasdale	Carol Greenwood
1994	Mark Kinch	Andrea Priestley
1995	Mark Kinch	Sarah Rowell
1996	Ian Holmes	Sarah Rowell
1997	Mark Roberts	Mari Todd
1998	Ian Holmes	Angela Brand-Barker
1999	Gavin Bland	Janet King
2000	Ian Holmes	Sally Newman
2001	Cancelled due to foot-and-mouth outbreak	
2002	Ian Holmes	Andrea Priestley
2003	Ian Holmes	Louise Sharp
2004	Simon Bailey	Louise Sharp
2005	Simon Bailey and Rob Hope	Sally Newman
2006	Rob Jebb	Natalie White
2007	Simon Bailey	Janet McIver
2008	Rob Jebb	Natalie White
2009	Simon Bailey	Philippa Jackson
2010	Rob Hope	~~Lauren Jeska~~* Olivia Walwyn
2011	Lloyd Taggart	~~Lauren Jeska~~* Helen Fines
2012	Simon Bailey	~~Lauren Jeska~~* Holly Page
2013	Simon Bailey	Victoria Wilkinson and Helen Fines
2014	Tom Addison	Victoria Wilkinson
2015	Simon Bailey	Victoria Wilkinson
2016	Simon Bailey	Victoria Wilkinson
2017	Sam Tosh	Victoria Wilkinson
2018	Carl Bell	Kelli Roberts
2019	Carl Bell	Kelli Roberts
2020	Cancelled due to COVID-19	
2021	Billy Cartwright	Hannah Horsburgh
2022	Matt Elkington	Hannah Russell
2023	Billy Cartwright	Nichola Jackson
2024	Ben Rothery	Nichola Jackson
2025	Ben Rothery and Finlay Grant	Sara Willhoit

- All Jeska's athletics results were declared null and void when she failed to produce samples of her testosterone levels.
