= Billy Bland (runner) =

British former long-distance runner

Personal information
- Nationality: British
- Born: 1947 (age 78–79) Borrowdale

Sport
- Sport: Fell running
- Updated on 4 November 2013

Billy Bland (born 1947) is a British former long-distance runner. He was one of the most prominent fell runners from the mid-1970s until the late 1980s, and is arguably the best long-distance fell runner in the history of the sport.

== Biography ==
Bland was born in 1947 in Borrowdale in the Lake District. His father Joe Bland was a guides racer and several other members of Billy's family also became fell runners, including his brothers Stuart and David.

Bland took part in professional guides races early in his career and was reinstated as an amateur around the time of the inaugural Borrowdale Fell Race in 1974. By 1976 he had improved enough to finish eighth in the British Championships. This was followed by further progression until 1980 when he became the British Champion.

Bland is a former holder of the record for the fell running challenge the Bob Graham Round which involves a circuit of forty-two Lake District peaks, covering around sixty-six miles. He accomplished this in a time of 13:53 on 19 June 1982. This stood as the fastest time until 8 July 2018 when it was beaten by Kilian Jornet.

Among Bland's other outstanding records are that for the Wasdale Fell Race, which he completed in 3:25:21 in 1982 (only three weeks after his Bob Graham Round record). This time has not been approached in recent years, despite the event being one of the counting races in the national championships on several occasions. He also holds the record for the Borrowdale Fell Race, having run 2:34:38 in 1981.

His life story is told in Steve Chilton's All or Nothing at All: The life of Billy Bland (Dingwall, 2020).
