= Fell running =

Sport of running and racing

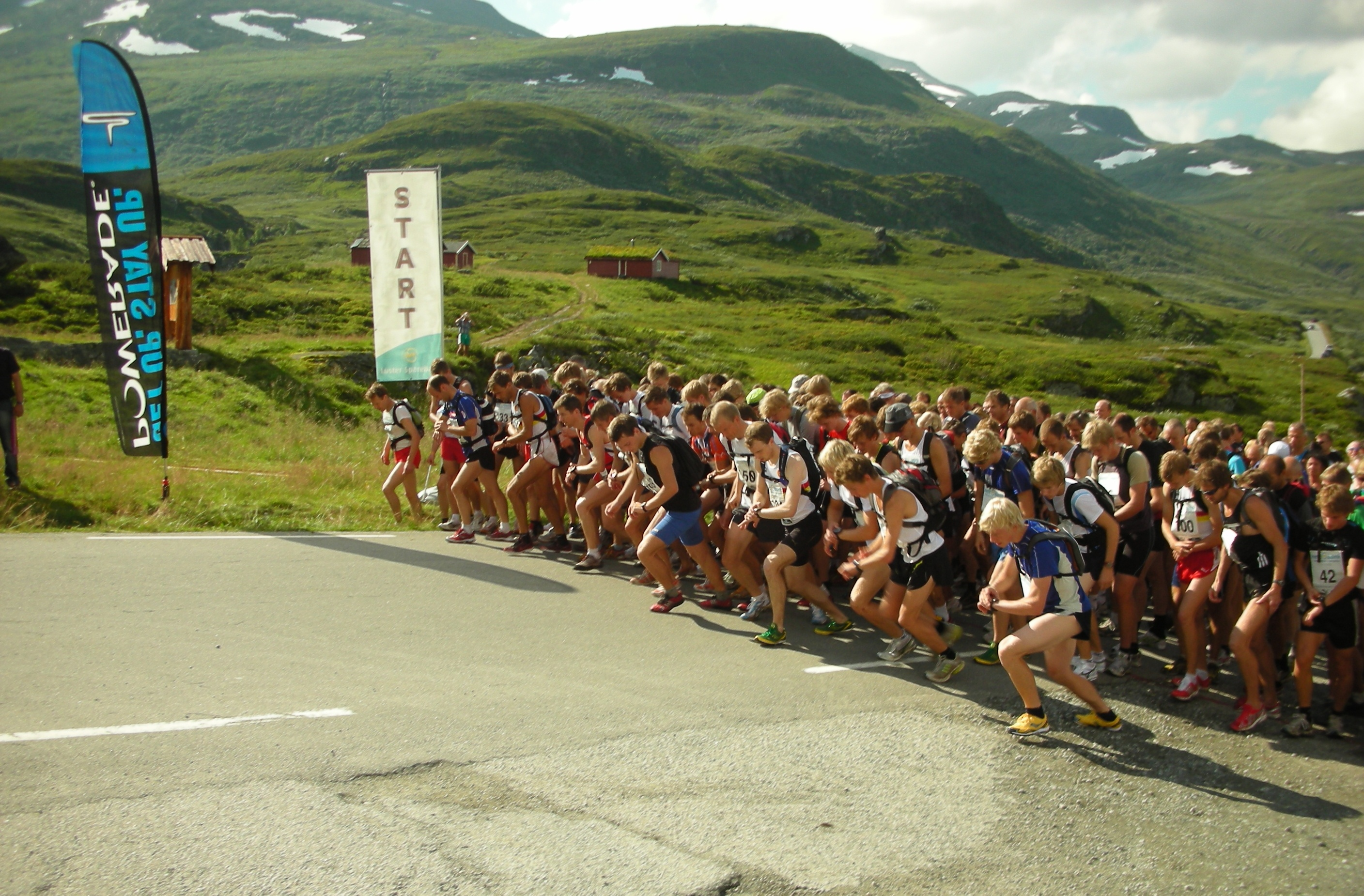
The start of a mountain running championship in Norway

Fell running, also sometimes known as hill running, is the sport of running and racing, off-road, over upland country where the gradient climbed is a significant component of the difficulty. The name arises from the origins of the English sport on the fells of northern Britain, especially those in the Lake District. It has elements of trail running, cross country and mountain running, but is also distinct from those disciplines.

Fell races are organised on the premise that contenders possess mountain navigation skills and carry adequate survival equipment as prescribed by the organiser. The ethos of fell-running is based on self-sufficiency in terms of equipment, food and skills in sharp contrast to adventure racing. Fell runners who become immobile due to injury or exhaustion are extremely vulnerable to hypothermia; consequently, building up experience and dynamic risk assessment are both important principles for fell runners more akin to mountaineering than allied athletic activities.

Fell running has common characteristics with cross-country running, but is distinguished by steeper gradients and upland country. It is sometimes considered a form of mountain running, but without the smoother trails and predetermined routes often associated with mountain running.

== History ==
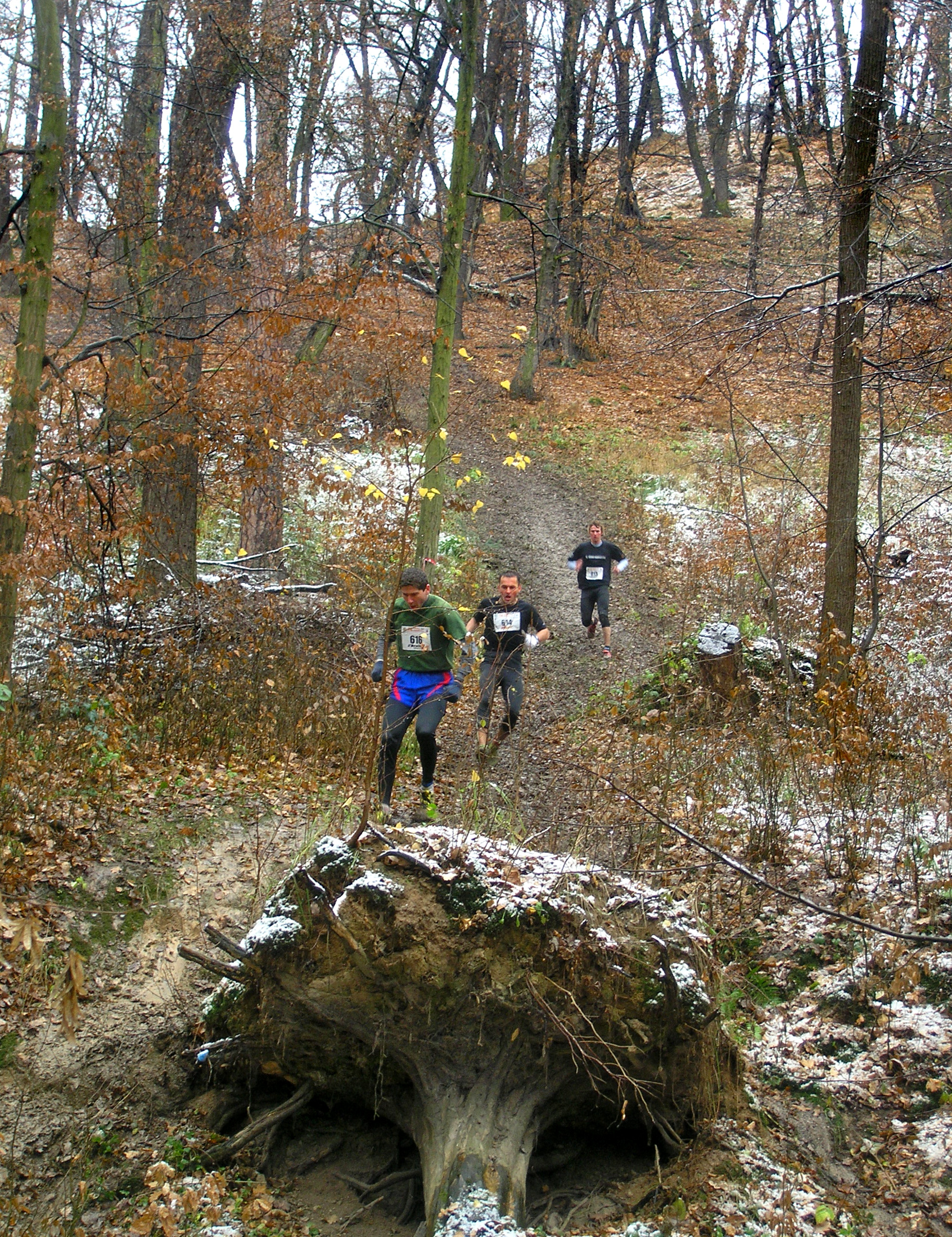
A hill-running race in Prague

The first recorded hill race took place in Scotland. King Malcolm Canmore organised a race in Braemar in 1040 or perhaps as late as 1064, reputedly to find a swift messenger. This event appears to have been a precursor to the Braemar Gathering. There is no documented connection between this event and the fell races of the 19th century.

From the 19th century records survive of fell races taking place as a part of community fairs and games. The sport was a simple affair and was based upon each community's values for physical ability. Fell races took place alongside other sports such as wrestling, sprint races and (especially in Scotland) heavy events such as throwing the hammer. These fairs or games events were often commercial as well as cultural, with livestock shows and sales taking place alongside music, dancing and sports. In a community of shepherds and agricultural labourers comparisons of speed and strength were interesting to spectators as a source of professional pride for competitors. The most famous of these events in England, the Grasmere Sports meeting in the Lake District, with its Guide's Race, still takes place every year in August.

The Fell Runners Association started in April 1970 to organise the duplication of event calendars for the amateur sport. As of 2013 it administers amateur fell running in England, in affiliation with British athletics. Separate governing bodies exist for each country of the United Kingdom and each country has its own tradition of fell running, though the sport is largely the same. The most important races of the year include the Ben Nevis Race in Scotland, run regularly since 1937, and the Snowdon Race in Wales.

== Overlap with other sports ==
Fell running is often known as hill running, particularly in Scotland. It is sometimes called mountain running, as in the name of the Northern Ireland Mountain Running Association although the term mountain running often has connotations of WMRA races which tend to be on smoother, drier trails and lack the route choice which may be available in fell races.

Fell race courses are often longer than cross-country running courses, steeper and unmarked when out on the hills (with a few exceptions). Fell running also overlaps with orienteering. Courses are again typically longer but with less emphasis on navigation. Fell running does sometimes require navigational skills in a mountainous environment, particularly in determining and choosing between routes, and poor weather may increase the need for navigation. However, in most fell races, the route or sequence of checkpoints is published beforehand and runners may reconnoitre the course to reduce the risk of losing time working out where to run during the race. Category O events and Mountain Marathons (see also below), test navigational ability, attracting both orienteers and fell runners. Other multi-terrain events, such as the Cotswold Way Relay and the Long Mynd Hike, also qualify as fell races under Fell Runners Association rules.

Some fell running could also be classed as trail running. Trail running normally takes place on good paths or tracks which are relatively easy to follow and does not necessarily involve the significant amounts of ascent that are required in fell running.

== Rocks ==
Fell running does not involve rock climbing and routes are subject to change if ground nearby becomes unstable. A small number of fell runners who are also rock climbers, nevertheless do attempt records traversing ridges that allow running and involve scrambling and rock climbing – particularly where the record is 24 hours or less. Foremost of these in the UK is probably the traverse of the Cuillin Main Ridge on Skye, the Greater Traverse, including Blaven and the Lakes Classic Rock Round.

== Organisations ==
The Fell Runners Association (FRA) publishes a calendar of 400 to 500 races per year. Additional races, less publicised, are organised in UK regions. The British Open Fell Runners Association (BOFRA) publishes a smaller calendar of races (usually 15 championship races, and other smaller events, such as galas or shows) – mostly derived from the professional guide races – in England and Scotland and organises a championship series. In Scotland, all known hill races (both professional and amateur) are listed in the annual calendar of Scottish Hill Runners. In Wales, the Welsh Fell Runners Association provides a similar service. Northern Ireland events are organised by Northern Ireland Mountain Running Association. Again, races are run on the premise that a contender possesses mountain navigational skills and carries adequate survival equipment. In Ireland, events are organised by the Irish Mountain Running Association.

The World Mountain Running Association is the governing body for mountain running and as such is sanctioned by and affiliated with the IAAF, the International Association of Athletics Federations. It organises the World Mountain Running Championships. There are also continental championships, such as the African Mountain Running Championships, the European Mountain Running Championships, the South American Mountain Running Championships and the North American Central American and Caribbean Mountain Running Championships.

== Championships ==
The first British Fell Running Championships, then known as Fell Runner of the Year, were held in 1972 and the scoring was based on results in all fell races. In 1976 this was changed to the runner's best ten category A races and further changes took place to the format in later years. Starting with the 1986 season, an English Fell Running Championships series has also taken place, based on results in various races of different lengths over the year.

== Race categories ==
Race records vary from a few minutes to, generally, a few hours. The longest common fell running challenges tend to be rounds to be completed within 24 hours, such as the Bob Graham Round. Some of the mountain marathons do call for pairs of runners to carry equipment and food for camping overnight. Longer possible routes do exist, such as an attempt at a continuous round of Munros. Mountaineers who traverse light and fast over high Alpine, Himalayan or through other such continental, high altitudes are considered alpine-style mountaineers by fell runners.

Races run under the FRA Rules For Competition of the Fell Runners Association are categorised by the amount of ascent and distance.

=== Ascent categories ===
==== Category A ====
- Should average not less than 50 metres climb per kilometre.
- Should be at least 1.5 kilometres in length.
- Should not have more than 20% of the race distance on road.

==== Category B ====
- Should average not less than 25 metres climb per kilometre.
- Should not have more than 30% of the race distance on road.

==== Category C ====
- Should average not less than 20 metres climb per kilometre.
- Should contain some genuine fell terrain.
- Should not have more than 40% of the race distance on road.

=== Distance Categories ===
==== Category L ====
- A category "L" (long) race is 20 kilometres or over.

==== Category M ====
- A category "M" (medium) race is over 10 kilometres but less than 20 kilometres.

==== Category S ====
- A category "S" (short) race is 10 kilometres or less.

=== Additional categories ===
==== Category O ====
- also known as a Long O event
- checkpoints are revealed to each competitor when they come up to a "staggered" start
- entry by choosing an orienteering type class, such as a Score-O event and often as a team of two (pairs)

==== Category MM ====
- events also known as mountain marathons and mountain trials
- similar to Category O, but multi-day events, in wild, mountainous country. Competitors must carry all the equipment and food required for the overnight camp and subsequent days. Entry is usually as a pair.

=== Three example "classic A" races ===
- Ben Nevis Race AM 10 miles (16 km) 4,400 ft (1340 m) - male record 1:25:34 (Kenny Stuart, 1984), female record 1:43:01 (Victoria Wilkinson, 2018)
- Blisco Dash AS 5 miles (8.1 km) 2,000 ft (610 m) - male record 36:01 (Jack Maitland, 1987), female record 44:34 (Hannah Horsburgh, 2018)
- Wasdale Fell Race AL 21 miles (34 km) 9,000 ft (2750 m) - male record 3:25:21 (Billy Bland, 1982), female record 4:12:17 (Janet McIver and Jackie Lee, 2008)

== Footwear ==
Special footwear isn't required, but fell-running trainers do differ from standard road shoes. Modern fell-running trainers are typically more durable materials and rugged treat that helps to eject water and shed peat after traversing boggy ground. While the trainer needs to be supple to grip an uneven, slippery surface, a degree of side protection against rock and scree (loose stones) may be provided. Rock plates underfoot can protect rocks or other sharps from poking the foot sole. Rubber studs or tread have been the mode for two decades, preceded by ripple soles, spikes and the flat-soled "pumps" of the fifties.

== 24-hour challenges ==
Fell runners have set many of the peak bagging records in the UK. In 1932 the Lakeland runner Bob Graham set a record of 42 Lakeland peaks in 24 hours. His feat, now known as the Bob Graham Round, was not repeated for many years (until 1960); by 2011, however, it had become a fell runner's test-piece, and had been repeated by more than 1,610 people. Building on the basic 'Round' later runners such as Eric Beard (56 tops in 1963) and Joss Naylor (72 tops in 1975) have raised the 24-hour Lakeland record considerably. The present record is 78 peaks, set by Kim Collison, on 11–12 July 2020; the previous record of 77 peaks, set by Mark Hartell, had stood since 1997. The women's record of 68 peaks was set in 2022 by Fiona Pascall.

Most fell-running regions have their own challenges or "rounds":

- Ireland – The Wicklow Round
- Lake District – The Bob Graham Round
- North Wales – The Paddy Buckley Round
- Northern Ireland – The Denis Rankin Round
- Scotland – The Ramsay Round
- South Wales – South Wales Traverse

== See also ==
- Adventure racing
- Bill Smith (fell runner)
- Fastpacking
- Lakeland Shows
- Peak bagging
- Rogaining
- Ski mountaineering
- Skyrunning
- Ultrarunning
