= Dieter Wolf =

Swiss orienteering competitor

Medal record

Men's orienteering

Representing Switzerland

World Championships
Silver medal – second place	1972 Jičín	Relay

Dieter Wolf is a Swiss orienteering competitor. He received a silver medal in the relay event at the 1972 World Orienteering Championships in Jičín, together with Dieter Hulliger, Bernard Marti and Karl John.
