= Bernard Marti =

Swiss orienteering competitor

Medal record

Men's orienteering

Representing Switzerland

World Championships
Silver medal – second place	1972 Jičín	Relay

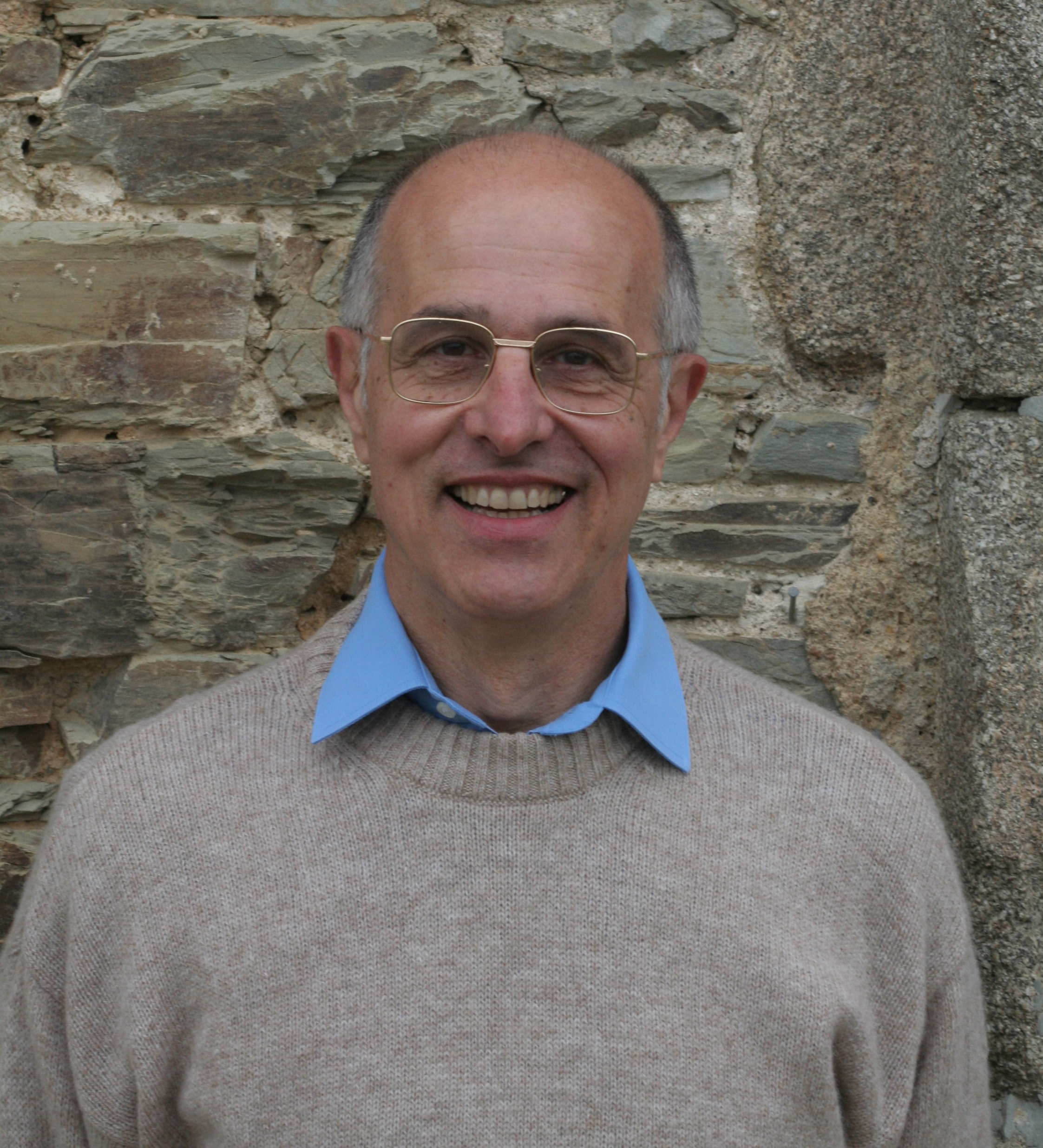
Bernard Marti in 2007

Bernard Marti (born 16 April 1943 in Paris) is a Swiss orienteering competitor. He received a silver medal in the relay event at the 1972 World Orienteering Championships in Jičín, together with Dieter Hulliger, Dieter Wolf and Karl John.
