= Magda Horváth =

Hungarian orienteering competitor

Medal record

Women's orienteering

Representing Hungary

World Championships
Silver medal – second place	1970 Friedrichroda	Relay

Magda Horváth is a Hungarian orienteering competitor. At the 1970 World Orienteering Championships in Friedrichroda she finished 19th in the individual event, and received a silver medal in the relay with the Hungarian team (with Ágnes Hegedűs and Sarolta Monspart). At the 1972 World Championships she finished 8th in the individual event, and fourth in the relay.
