= Karl John =

Karl John may refer to:

- Karl John (orienteer), Swiss orienteering competitor
- Karl John (actor), German actor
