= Ágnes Hegedűs =

Hungarian orienteering competitor

Medal record

Women's orienteering

Representing Hungary

World Championships
Silver medal – second place	1970 Friedrichroda	Relay

Ágnes Hegedűs (born 1949) is a Hungarian orienteering competitor. At the 1970 World Orienteering Championships in Friedrichroda she finished 6th in the individual event, and received a silver medal in the relay with the Hungarian team (with Magda Horváth and Sarolta Monspart). In the 1972 World Orienteering Championships she finished fourth in the relay, also with Horváth and Monspart.
