= List of minor planets: 586001–587000 =

The following is a partial list of minor planets, running from minor-planet number 586001 through 587000, inclusive. The primary data for this and other partial lists is based on JPL's "Small-Body Orbital Elements" and data available from the Minor Planet Center. Critical list information is also provided by the MPC, unless otherwise specified from Lowell Observatory. A detailed description of the table's columns and additional sources are given on the main page including a complete list of every page in this series, and a statistical break-up on the dynamical classification of minor planets.

Also see the summary list of all named bodies in numerical and alphabetical order, and the corresponding naming citations for the number range of this particular list. New namings may only be added to this list after official publication, as the preannouncement of names is condemned by the Working Group for Small Bodies Nomenclature of the International Astronomical Union.

Near-Earth obj.	MBA (inner)	MBA (outer)	Centaur
Mars-crosser	MBA (middle)	Jupiter trojan	Trans-Neptunian obj.
Unclassified

== 586001–586100 ==
Designation			Discovery			Properties		Ref
Permanent	Provisional	Named after	Date	Site	Discoverer(s)	Category	Diam.	Ref
586001	2000 QX_{259}	—	August 29, 2014	Kitt Peak	Spacewatch	·	560 m	MPC · JPL
586002	2000 RH_{108}	—	November 3, 2004	Kitt Peak	Spacewatch	·	760 m	MPC · JPL
586003 Monspartsarolta	2000 RY_{108}	Monspartsarolta	September 28, 2016	Piszkéstető	K. Sárneczky, Á. Sódor	·	1.7 km	MPC · JPL
586004	2000 RD_{109}	—	September 24, 2011	Haleakala	Pan-STARRS 1	EOS	1.4 km	MPC · JPL
586005	2000 RW_{109}	—	April 14, 2016	Haleakala	Pan-STARRS 1	·	1.2 km	MPC · JPL
586006	2000 RB_{110}	—	January 28, 2007	Mount Lemmon	Mount Lemmon Survey	H	360 m	MPC · JPL
586007	2000 RF_{111}	—	February 22, 2014	Mount Lemmon	Mount Lemmon Survey	·	1.8 km	MPC · JPL
586008	2000 RY_{112}	—	September 5, 2000	Apache Point	SDSS Collaboration	·	1.8 km	MPC · JPL
586009	2000 SX_{21}	—	September 24, 2000	Socorro	LINEAR	·	480 m	MPC · JPL
586010	2000 SL_{44}	—	September 26, 2000	Socorro	LINEAR	·	1.3 km	MPC · JPL
586011	2000 SP_{58}	—	September 24, 2000	Kitt Peak	Spacewatch	(5)	1.6 km	MPC · JPL
586012	2000 SJ_{377}	—	September 1, 2005	Kitt Peak	Spacewatch	·	1.9 km	MPC · JPL
586013	2000 SQ_{377}	—	April 4, 2003	Kitt Peak	Spacewatch	·	2.1 km	MPC · JPL
586014	2000 SB_{378}	—	August 23, 2004	Kitt Peak	Spacewatch	·	1.1 km	MPC · JPL
586015	2000 SF_{378}	—	April 25, 2015	Haleakala	Pan-STARRS 1	·	1.7 km	MPC · JPL
586016	2000 SR_{378}	—	August 26, 2005	Palomar	NEAT	·	1.8 km	MPC · JPL
586017	2000 SW_{378}	—	February 26, 2014	Haleakala	Pan-STARRS 1	·	2.2 km	MPC · JPL
586018	2000 SZ_{378}	—	November 9, 2013	Kitt Peak	Spacewatch	·	1.2 km	MPC · JPL
586019	2000 SQ_{379}	—	September 13, 2016	Mount Lemmon	Mount Lemmon Survey	·	1.8 km	MPC · JPL
586020	2000 SA_{382}	—	August 30, 2005	Kitt Peak	Spacewatch	EOS	1.8 km	MPC · JPL
586021	2000 SD_{382}	—	November 10, 2009	Kitt Peak	Spacewatch	HNS	1.3 km	MPC · JPL
586022	2000 SV_{382}	—	June 25, 1995	Kitt Peak	Spacewatch	MAR	970 m	MPC · JPL
586023	2000 SO_{383}	—	September 25, 2017	Haleakala	Pan-STARRS 1	·	870 m	MPC · JPL
586024	2000 SQ_{384}	—	August 8, 2005	Cerro Tololo	Deep Ecliptic Survey	·	2.1 km	MPC · JPL
586025	2000 SE_{385}	—	March 28, 2015	Haleakala	Pan-STARRS 1	MAR	860 m	MPC · JPL
586026	2000 SM_{385}	—	February 9, 2008	Mount Lemmon	Mount Lemmon Survey	·	2.2 km	MPC · JPL
586027	2000 TT	—	October 1, 2000	Socorro	LINEAR	·	2.9 km	MPC · JPL
586028	2000 TW	—	September 20, 2000	Kitt Peak	Spacewatch	EUN	1.0 km	MPC · JPL
586029	2000 TA_{1}	—	October 1, 2000	Socorro	LINEAR	(116763)	1.6 km	MPC · JPL
586030	2000 TS_{40}	—	October 1, 2000	Socorro	LINEAR	·	1.4 km	MPC · JPL
586031	2000 TF_{44}	—	September 26, 2000	Haleakala	NEAT	·	880 m	MPC · JPL
586032	2000 TL_{71}	—	October 6, 2000	Kitt Peak	Spacewatch	·	1.5 km	MPC · JPL
586033	2000 TD_{75}	—	October 7, 2000	Kitt Peak	Spacewatch	RAF	900 m	MPC · JPL
586034	2000 TU_{75}	—	August 27, 2005	Palomar	NEAT	EOS	1.5 km	MPC · JPL
586035	2000 TZ_{75}	—	January 25, 2015	Haleakala	Pan-STARRS 1	EUN	950 m	MPC · JPL
586036	2000 TL_{77}	—	May 4, 2014	Haleakala	Pan-STARRS 1	·	1.7 km	MPC · JPL
586037	2000 TA_{81}	—	February 13, 2008	Mount Lemmon	Mount Lemmon Survey	·	2.1 km	MPC · JPL
586038	2000 TD_{81}	—	April 3, 2011	Haleakala	Pan-STARRS 1	·	970 m	MPC · JPL
586039	2000 UE_{115}	—	October 1, 2000	Kitt Peak	Spacewatch	·	1.4 km	MPC · JPL
586040	2000 UJ_{115}	—	September 1, 2005	Kitt Peak	Spacewatch	·	2.1 km	MPC · JPL
586041	2000 VY_{20}	—	November 1, 2000	Kitt Peak	Spacewatch	EUN	1.2 km	MPC · JPL
586042	2000 VR_{38}	—	November 1, 2000	Kitt Peak	Spacewatch	·	1.1 km	MPC · JPL
586043	2000 VG_{66}	—	September 9, 2007	Mount Lemmon	Mount Lemmon Survey	·	810 m	MPC · JPL
586044	2000 WX_{64}	—	November 27, 2000	Kitt Peak	Spacewatch	·	950 m	MPC · JPL
586045	2000 WR_{198}	—	April 1, 2003	Apache Point	SDSS Collaboration	·	2.6 km	MPC · JPL
586046	2000 WS_{198}	—	June 29, 2008	Siding Spring	SSS	·	1.9 km	MPC · JPL
586047	2000 WY_{198}	—	March 28, 2011	Kitt Peak	Spacewatch	·	1.4 km	MPC · JPL
586048	2000 WJ_{199}	—	April 10, 2003	Kitt Peak	Spacewatch	EUN	1.1 km	MPC · JPL
586049	2000 WO_{199}	—	February 13, 2002	Apache Point	SDSS Collaboration	·	2.0 km	MPC · JPL
586050	2000 WH_{200}	—	December 10, 2013	Mount Lemmon	Mount Lemmon Survey	·	1.4 km	MPC · JPL
586051	2000 WV_{200}	—	November 28, 2013	Mount Lemmon	Mount Lemmon Survey	·	1.2 km	MPC · JPL
586052	2000 WS_{201}	—	November 16, 2000	Kitt Peak	Spacewatch	·	1.3 km	MPC · JPL
586053	2000 WK_{202}	—	October 20, 2004	Catalina	CSS	·	1.3 km	MPC · JPL
586054	2000 WW_{202}	—	April 1, 2008	Kitt Peak	Spacewatch	THM	2.0 km	MPC · JPL
586055	2000 WF_{203}	—	November 27, 2017	Mount Lemmon	Mount Lemmon Survey	·	1.6 km	MPC · JPL
586056	2000 WJ_{203}	—	October 7, 2007	Mount Lemmon	Mount Lemmon Survey	·	680 m	MPC · JPL
586057	2000 XS	—	December 1, 2000	Kitt Peak	Spacewatch	·	1.4 km	MPC · JPL
586058	2000 XX_{55}	—	October 12, 2007	Mount Lemmon	Mount Lemmon Survey	·	1.1 km	MPC · JPL
586059	2000 YR_{27}	—	December 30, 2000	Kitt Peak	Spacewatch	·	2.5 km	MPC · JPL
586060	2000 YE_{144}	—	April 6, 2008	Mount Lemmon	Mount Lemmon Survey	·	2.6 km	MPC · JPL
586061	2000 YF_{144}	—	December 21, 2000	Kitt Peak	Spacewatch	TIR	3.8 km	MPC · JPL
586062	2000 YJ_{144}	—	December 11, 2013	Haleakala	Pan-STARRS 1	·	1.4 km	MPC · JPL
586063	2000 YU_{144}	—	December 14, 2013	Mount Lemmon	Mount Lemmon Survey	·	1.4 km	MPC · JPL
586064	2000 YB_{145}	—	March 29, 2015	Haleakala	Pan-STARRS 1	·	1.4 km	MPC · JPL
586065	2000 YU_{145}	—	July 12, 2015	Haleakala	Pan-STARRS 1	·	3.1 km	MPC · JPL
586066	2001 AQ_{54}	—	October 26, 2011	Haleakala	Pan-STARRS 1	NYS	1.1 km	MPC · JPL
586067	2001 AR_{54}	—	July 24, 2010	WISE	WISE	·	2.5 km	MPC · JPL
586068	2001 BS_{83}	—	November 6, 2005	Kitt Peak	Spacewatch	·	2.5 km	MPC · JPL
586069	2001 BT_{83}	—	March 12, 2005	Kitt Peak	Spacewatch	MAS	720 m	MPC · JPL
586070	2001 BV_{83}	—	January 21, 2015	Haleakala	Pan-STARRS 1	·	1.8 km	MPC · JPL
586071	2001 BX_{84}	—	December 1, 2010	Mount Lemmon	Mount Lemmon Survey	L4	9.0 km	MPC · JPL
586072	2001 BC_{85}	—	January 20, 2018	Haleakala	Pan-STARRS 1	·	2.8 km	MPC · JPL
586073	2001 CC_{50}	—	March 10, 2007	Mount Lemmon	Mount Lemmon Survey	·	2.7 km	MPC · JPL
586074	2001 CD_{50}	—	August 11, 2012	Siding Spring	SSS	·	1.9 km	MPC · JPL
586075	2001 CF_{50}	—	February 25, 2007	Mount Lemmon	Mount Lemmon Survey	·	2.6 km	MPC · JPL
586076	2001 CJ_{50}	—	February 2, 2001	Kitt Peak	Spacewatch	NYS	780 m	MPC · JPL
586077	2001 DW_{57}	—	February 19, 2001	Kitt Peak	Spacewatch	EOS	1.5 km	MPC · JPL
586078	2001 DR_{95}	—	January 21, 2012	Kitt Peak	Spacewatch	·	2.2 km	MPC · JPL
586079	2001 DD_{112}	—	March 11, 2005	Kitt Peak	Spacewatch	·	1.0 km	MPC · JPL
586080	2001 DF_{112}	—	March 15, 2010	Mount Lemmon	Mount Lemmon Survey	JUN	890 m	MPC · JPL
586081	2001 DG_{112}	—	February 27, 2012	Haleakala	Pan-STARRS 1	NYS	700 m	MPC · JPL
586082	2001 DK_{112}	—	January 10, 2014	Mount Lemmon	Mount Lemmon Survey	·	1.7 km	MPC · JPL
586083	2001 DM_{112}	—	March 7, 2008	Mount Lemmon	Mount Lemmon Survey	·	750 m	MPC · JPL
586084	2001 DW_{112}	—	February 21, 2001	Kitt Peak	Spacewatch	·	2.6 km	MPC · JPL
586085	2001 DY_{112}	—	January 30, 2012	Kitt Peak	Spacewatch	EOS	2.0 km	MPC · JPL
586086	2001 DE_{113}	—	February 20, 2001	Apache Point	SDSS Collaboration	·	1.2 km	MPC · JPL
586087	2001 DN_{113}	—	November 10, 2010	Mount Lemmon	Mount Lemmon Survey	·	3.2 km	MPC · JPL
586088	2001 DQ_{113}	—	October 13, 2016	Haleakala	Pan-STARRS 1	·	2.5 km	MPC · JPL
586089	2001 DG_{117}	—	January 18, 2013	Mount Lemmon	Mount Lemmon Survey	L4	9.1 km	MPC · JPL
586090	2001 DH_{117}	—	September 23, 2015	Mount Lemmon	Mount Lemmon Survey	·	2.5 km	MPC · JPL
586091	2001 DK_{117}	—	February 24, 2001	Haleakala	NEAT	·	1.9 km	MPC · JPL
586092	2001 DT_{117}	—	October 27, 2017	Mount Lemmon	Mount Lemmon Survey	·	1.4 km	MPC · JPL
586093	2001 DJ_{118}	—	March 12, 2013	Mount Lemmon	Mount Lemmon Survey	·	2.5 km	MPC · JPL
586094	2001 DL_{118}	—	November 15, 1998	Kitt Peak	Spacewatch	L4	8.5 km	MPC · JPL
586095	2001 DM_{118}	—	November 28, 2013	Mount Lemmon	Mount Lemmon Survey	·	1.8 km	MPC · JPL
586096	2001 DR_{118}	—	September 18, 2014	Haleakala	Pan-STARRS 1	·	1.9 km	MPC · JPL
586097	2001 DP_{119}	—	December 30, 2005	Kitt Peak	Spacewatch	·	1.4 km	MPC · JPL
586098	2001 FO_{31}	—	March 20, 2001	Kitt Peak	Spacewatch	·	660 m	MPC · JPL
586099	2001 FJ_{181}	—	March 21, 2001	Kitt Peak	Spacewatch	·	1.3 km	MPC · JPL
586100	2001 FO_{183}	—	March 26, 2001	Kitt Peak	Spacewatch	MAS	580 m	MPC · JPL

== 586101–586200 ==
back to top

Designation			Discovery			Properties		Ref
Permanent	Provisional	Named after	Date	Site	Discoverer(s)	Category	Diam.	Ref
586101	2001 FX_{197}	—	May 21, 2001	Cerro Tololo	Deep Ecliptic Survey	·	1.5 km	MPC · JPL
586102	2001 FX_{202}	—	September 21, 2003	Kitt Peak	Spacewatch	·	1.5 km	MPC · JPL
586103	2001 FK_{204}	—	November 19, 2008	Kitt Peak	Spacewatch	AGN	920 m	MPC · JPL
586104	2001 FT_{208}	—	March 20, 2001	Kitt Peak	Spacewatch	·	970 m	MPC · JPL
586105	2001 FM_{212}	—	March 21, 2001	Kitt Peak	SKADS	·	2.6 km	MPC · JPL
586106	2001 FC_{219}	—	March 21, 2001	Kitt Peak	SKADS	MAS	550 m	MPC · JPL
586107	2001 FK_{233}	—	March 21, 2001	Kitt Peak	SKADS	·	3.0 km	MPC · JPL
586108	2001 FZ_{240}	—	March 29, 2001	Kitt Peak	SKADS	HOF	1.8 km	MPC · JPL
586109	2001 FS_{242}	—	March 23, 2001	Kitt Peak	SKADS	·	640 m	MPC · JPL
586110	2001 FS_{243}	—	March 15, 2007	Kitt Peak	Spacewatch	·	2.6 km	MPC · JPL
586111	2001 FL_{245}	—	January 11, 2008	Kitt Peak	Spacewatch	·	980 m	MPC · JPL
586112	2001 FC_{247}	—	March 25, 2007	Mount Lemmon	Mount Lemmon Survey	·	3.1 km	MPC · JPL
586113	2001 HK_{69}	—	October 14, 2007	Kitt Peak	Spacewatch	·	1.5 km	MPC · JPL
586114	2001 KL_{80}	—	January 19, 2012	Haleakala	Pan-STARRS 1	·	1.2 km	MPC · JPL
586115	2001 KW_{80}	—	December 31, 2013	Kitt Peak	Spacewatch	HOF	2.0 km	MPC · JPL
586116	2001 KS_{83}	—	September 4, 2010	Mount Lemmon	Mount Lemmon Survey	·	1.2 km	MPC · JPL
586117	2001 KE_{84}	—	March 13, 2010	Mount Lemmon	Mount Lemmon Survey	·	1.5 km	MPC · JPL
586118	2001 KA_{85}	—	November 18, 2003	Kitt Peak	Spacewatch	·	1.1 km	MPC · JPL
586119	2001 KL_{87}	—	February 15, 2010	Kitt Peak	Spacewatch	·	1.5 km	MPC · JPL
586120	2001 KW_{87}	—	June 24, 2014	Haleakala	Pan-STARRS 1	·	2.4 km	MPC · JPL
586121	2001 MQ_{31}	—	February 9, 2008	Mount Lemmon	Mount Lemmon Survey	·	1.4 km	MPC · JPL
586122	2001 PG_{42}	—	August 12, 2001	Palomar	NEAT	·	2.1 km	MPC · JPL
586123	2001 QL_{92}	—	August 22, 2001	Socorro	LINEAR	PHO	1.2 km	MPC · JPL
586124	2001 QL_{175}	—	August 21, 2001	Kitt Peak	Spacewatch	HOF	2.5 km	MPC · JPL
586125	2001 QA_{255}	—	August 16, 2001	Palomar	NEAT	·	860 m	MPC · JPL
586126	2001 QO_{305}	—	August 19, 2001	Cerro Tololo	Deep Ecliptic Survey	·	820 m	MPC · JPL
586127	2001 QP_{335}	—	October 23, 2012	Kitt Peak	Spacewatch	KOR	1.3 km	MPC · JPL
586128	2001 QV_{335}	—	August 27, 2001	Kitt Peak	Spacewatch	V	620 m	MPC · JPL
586129	2001 QQ_{336}	—	August 28, 2014	Haleakala	Pan-STARRS 1	·	4.1 km	MPC · JPL
586130	2001 QE_{338}	—	February 1, 2013	Kitt Peak	Spacewatch	·	610 m	MPC · JPL
586131	2001 RK_{156}	—	September 12, 2001	Kitt Peak	Spacewatch	KOR	1.3 km	MPC · JPL
586132	2001 RM_{157}	—	December 21, 2014	Haleakala	Pan-STARRS 1	·	970 m	MPC · JPL
586133	2001 RS_{157}	—	December 22, 2012	Haleakala	Pan-STARRS 1	NAE	1.7 km	MPC · JPL
586134	2001 SK_{34}	—	May 22, 2001	Cerro Tololo	Deep Ecliptic Survey	·	660 m	MPC · JPL
586135	2001 SV_{199}	—	September 19, 2001	Socorro	LINEAR	·	760 m	MPC · JPL
586136	2001 SY_{213}	—	September 19, 2001	Socorro	LINEAR	·	2.2 km	MPC · JPL
586137	2001 SB_{341}	—	September 21, 2001	Socorro	LINEAR	KOR	1.2 km	MPC · JPL
586138	2001 SK_{341}	—	September 21, 2001	Socorro	LINEAR	·	600 m	MPC · JPL
586139	2001 SE_{357}	—	September 21, 2001	Kitt Peak	Spacewatch	·	1.1 km	MPC · JPL
586140	2001 SO_{357}	—	September 28, 2001	Palomar	NEAT	·	1.2 km	MPC · JPL
586141	2001 SD_{361}	—	August 28, 2006	Kitt Peak	Spacewatch	·	1.6 km	MPC · JPL
586142	2001 SH_{361}	—	September 22, 2017	Haleakala	Pan-STARRS 1	·	1.1 km	MPC · JPL
586143	2001 SX_{362}	—	September 22, 2001	Kitt Peak	Spacewatch	·	610 m	MPC · JPL
586144	2001 TK_{108}	—	October 14, 2001	Socorro	LINEAR	·	1.5 km	MPC · JPL
586145	2001 TO_{256}	—	April 6, 2008	Kitt Peak	Spacewatch	·	840 m	MPC · JPL
586146	2001 TA_{265}	—	September 18, 2001	Kitt Peak	Spacewatch	·	420 m	MPC · JPL
586147	2001 UV_{4}	—	October 14, 2001	Socorro	LINEAR	·	480 m	MPC · JPL
586148	2001 UC_{92}	—	October 18, 2001	Palomar	NEAT	·	620 m	MPC · JPL
586149	2001 UR_{112}	—	October 21, 2001	Socorro	LINEAR	H	370 m	MPC · JPL
586150	2001 UH_{200}	—	October 21, 2001	Socorro	LINEAR	·	1.5 km	MPC · JPL
586151	2001 UO_{227}	—	November 18, 2001	Apache Point	SDSS Collaboration	·	570 m	MPC · JPL
586152	2001 UT_{232}	—	October 26, 2001	Kitt Peak	Spacewatch	·	2.8 km	MPC · JPL
586153	2001 UX_{232}	—	October 23, 2001	Palomar	NEAT	·	1.0 km	MPC · JPL
586154	2001 UP_{233}	—	October 25, 2001	Apache Point	SDSS Collaboration	·	1.1 km	MPC · JPL
586155	2001 UW_{234}	—	September 18, 2006	Kitt Peak	Spacewatch	EOS	1.5 km	MPC · JPL
586156	2001 US_{238}	—	October 5, 2013	Haleakala	Pan-STARRS 1	·	860 m	MPC · JPL
586157	2001 UN_{240}	—	October 29, 2008	Kitt Peak	Spacewatch	·	510 m	MPC · JPL
586158	2001 VR_{134}	—	October 24, 2005	Kitt Peak	Spacewatch	·	490 m	MPC · JPL
586159	2001 VX_{137}	—	December 4, 2007	Mount Lemmon	Mount Lemmon Survey	THM	2.0 km	MPC · JPL
586160	2001 WA_{69}	—	November 20, 2001	Socorro	LINEAR	·	1.0 km	MPC · JPL
586161	2001 WR_{104}	—	September 26, 2005	Kitt Peak	Spacewatch	·	1.0 km	MPC · JPL
586162	2001 XX_{12}	—	December 9, 2001	Socorro	LINEAR	MAR	1.7 km	MPC · JPL
586163	2001 XG_{128}	—	December 14, 2001	Socorro	LINEAR	·	830 m	MPC · JPL
586164	2001 XO_{147}	—	December 14, 2001	Socorro	LINEAR	·	1.0 km	MPC · JPL
586165	2001 XS_{269}	—	October 8, 2016	Haleakala	Pan-STARRS 1	·	1.7 km	MPC · JPL
586166	2001 YO_{39}	—	December 18, 2001	Socorro	LINEAR	·	2.1 km	MPC · JPL
586167	2001 YM_{142}	—	December 17, 2001	Socorro	LINEAR	·	730 m	MPC · JPL
586168	2001 YX_{162}	—	October 20, 2011	Mount Lemmon	Mount Lemmon Survey	·	2.0 km	MPC · JPL
586169	2001 YE_{163}	—	November 16, 2011	Kitt Peak	Spacewatch	·	2.0 km	MPC · JPL
586170	2002 AC_{7}	—	January 9, 2002	Cima Ekar	ADAS	·	1.9 km	MPC · JPL
586171	2002 AZ_{192}	—	January 12, 2002	Palomar	NEAT	·	2.6 km	MPC · JPL
586172	2002 AY_{194}	—	January 13, 2002	Kitt Peak	Spacewatch	·	3.4 km	MPC · JPL
586173	2002 AG_{210}	—	January 19, 2002	Anderson Mesa	LONEOS	·	1.7 km	MPC · JPL
586174	2002 AX_{210}	—	August 31, 2005	Kitt Peak	Spacewatch	·	2.4 km	MPC · JPL
586175	2002 AD_{212}	—	March 3, 2013	Haleakala	Pan-STARRS 1	·	2.0 km	MPC · JPL
586176	2002 AN_{212}	—	March 5, 2013	Haleakala	Pan-STARRS 1	EOS	1.3 km	MPC · JPL
586177	2002 AT_{215}	—	February 19, 2013	Mount Lemmon	Mount Lemmon Survey	·	2.2 km	MPC · JPL
586178	2002 AV_{215}	—	January 30, 2009	Mount Lemmon	Mount Lemmon Survey	·	540 m	MPC · JPL
586179	2002 AY_{215}	—	October 6, 2016	Haleakala	Pan-STARRS 1	·	1.9 km	MPC · JPL
586180	2002 BZ_{32}	—	November 25, 2011	Haleakala	Pan-STARRS 1	·	1.8 km	MPC · JPL
586181	2002 BS_{33}	—	December 1, 2011	Haleakala	Pan-STARRS 1	·	580 m	MPC · JPL
586182	2002 BX_{33}	—	February 8, 2008	Kitt Peak	Spacewatch	·	2.0 km	MPC · JPL
586183	2002 CT_{17}	—	January 14, 2002	Socorro	LINEAR	·	1.4 km	MPC · JPL
586184	2002 CH_{19}	—	January 12, 2002	Palomar	NEAT	EUN	1.6 km	MPC · JPL
586185	2002 CQ_{116}	—	February 8, 2002	Palomar	NEAT	H	580 m	MPC · JPL
586186	2002 CJ_{150}	—	January 14, 2002	Kitt Peak	Spacewatch	TIR	2.2 km	MPC · JPL
586187	2002 CZ_{175}	—	February 10, 2002	Socorro	LINEAR	·	1.6 km	MPC · JPL
586188	2002 CE_{200}	—	February 7, 2002	Palomar	NEAT	·	1.4 km	MPC · JPL
586189	2002 CM_{213}	—	February 7, 2002	Kitt Peak	Spacewatch	·	2.1 km	MPC · JPL
586190	2002 CR_{260}	—	February 7, 2002	Palomar	NEAT	·	1.2 km	MPC · JPL
586191	2002 CR_{262}	—	February 9, 2002	Kitt Peak	Spacewatch	·	3.0 km	MPC · JPL
586192	2002 CX_{268}	—	February 7, 2002	Kitt Peak	Spacewatch	·	1.4 km	MPC · JPL
586193	2002 CP_{296}	—	February 10, 2002	Socorro	LINEAR	H	420 m	MPC · JPL
586194	2002 CY_{315}	—	February 13, 2002	Kitt Peak	Spacewatch	L4	9.8 km	MPC · JPL
586195	2002 CS_{317}	—	October 23, 2011	Haleakala	Pan-STARRS 1	·	2.1 km	MPC · JPL
586196	2002 CJ_{319}	—	December 10, 2014	Haleakala	Pan-STARRS 1	HNS	1.1 km	MPC · JPL
586197	2002 CN_{319}	—	September 28, 2011	Kitt Peak	Spacewatch	THM	1.9 km	MPC · JPL
586198	2002 CQ_{323}	—	September 7, 2008	Catalina	CSS	L4	7.7 km	MPC · JPL
586199	2002 CY_{323}	—	September 17, 2017	Haleakala	Pan-STARRS 1	·	1.2 km	MPC · JPL
586200	2002 CZ_{325}	—	October 12, 1998	Kitt Peak	Spacewatch	L4	6.2 km	MPC · JPL

== 586201–586300 ==
back to top

Designation			Discovery			Properties		Ref
Permanent	Provisional	Named after	Date	Site	Discoverer(s)	Category	Diam.	Ref
586201	2002 CC_{326}	—	March 13, 2011	Mount Lemmon	Mount Lemmon Survey	·	1.3 km	MPC · JPL
586202	2002 CK_{326}	—	October 9, 2016	Haleakala	Pan-STARRS 1	·	2.1 km	MPC · JPL
586203	2002 CN_{326}	—	September 5, 2008	Kitt Peak	Spacewatch	·	1.1 km	MPC · JPL
586204	2002 CB_{327}	—	April 10, 2015	Haleakala	Pan-STARRS 1	L4	6.7 km	MPC · JPL
586205	2002 CL_{327}	—	February 13, 2002	Apache Point	SDSS Collaboration	·	2.0 km	MPC · JPL
586206	2002 DF_{8}	—	February 19, 2002	Socorro	LINEAR	H	580 m	MPC · JPL
586207	2002 DM_{20}	—	February 20, 2002	Kitt Peak	Spacewatch	·	2.4 km	MPC · JPL
586208	2002 DV_{20}	—	February 16, 2002	Palomar	NEAT	·	940 m	MPC · JPL
586209	2002 DQ_{21}	—	February 20, 2002	Kitt Peak	Spacewatch	·	890 m	MPC · JPL
586210	2002 DS_{21}	—	October 2, 2010	Kitt Peak	Spacewatch	·	2.1 km	MPC · JPL
586211	2002 DV_{21}	—	February 7, 2013	Kitt Peak	Spacewatch	·	2.4 km	MPC · JPL
586212	2002 DA_{22}	—	March 8, 2013	Haleakala	Pan-STARRS 1	·	2.6 km	MPC · JPL
586213	2002 ET_{36}	—	March 9, 2002	Kitt Peak	Spacewatch	·	530 m	MPC · JPL
586214	2002 EV_{38}	—	February 19, 2002	Kvistaberg	Uppsala-DLR Asteroid Survey	·	1.5 km	MPC · JPL
586215	2002 EB_{79}	—	March 10, 2002	Haleakala	NEAT	JUN	1.1 km	MPC · JPL
586216	2002 EX_{81}	—	March 13, 2002	Palomar	NEAT	·	2.8 km	MPC · JPL
586217	2002 EE_{118}	—	February 20, 2002	Kitt Peak	Spacewatch	·	1.2 km	MPC · JPL
586218	2002 EP_{119}	—	March 10, 2002	Kitt Peak	Spacewatch	·	1.3 km	MPC · JPL
586219	2002 EN_{124}	—	March 12, 2002	Kitt Peak	Spacewatch	·	1.4 km	MPC · JPL
586220	2002 ET_{134}	—	March 13, 2002	Palomar	NEAT	·	1.0 km	MPC · JPL
586221	2002 EO_{136}	—	March 12, 2002	Palomar	NEAT	MAS	660 m	MPC · JPL
586222	2002 EL_{155}	—	March 5, 2002	Anderson Mesa	LONEOS	TIR	3.2 km	MPC · JPL
586223	2002 EP_{162}	—	March 4, 2002	Kitt Peak	Spacewatch	EOS	1.7 km	MPC · JPL
586224	2002 EH_{164}	—	February 28, 2008	Kitt Peak	Spacewatch	HYG	2.9 km	MPC · JPL
586225	2002 EJ_{165}	—	October 12, 2010	Mount Lemmon	Mount Lemmon Survey	L4	8.3 km	MPC · JPL
586226	2002 ES_{165}	—	May 21, 2011	Mount Lemmon	Mount Lemmon Survey	·	1.5 km	MPC · JPL
586227	2002 EK_{166}	—	January 28, 2007	Mount Lemmon	Mount Lemmon Survey	·	1.9 km	MPC · JPL
586228	2002 EV_{166}	—	March 13, 2002	Kitt Peak	Spacewatch	·	920 m	MPC · JPL
586229	2002 EY_{166}	—	March 13, 2002	Kitt Peak	Spacewatch	KOR	1.2 km	MPC · JPL
586230	2002 EL_{168}	—	April 29, 2006	Kitt Peak	Spacewatch	·	660 m	MPC · JPL
586231	2002 EP_{168}	—	January 17, 2016	Haleakala	Pan-STARRS 1	·	620 m	MPC · JPL
586232	2002 EK_{169}	—	January 27, 2007	Mount Lemmon	Mount Lemmon Survey	HYG	2.3 km	MPC · JPL
586233	2002 EK_{170}	—	March 28, 2008	Mount Lemmon	Mount Lemmon Survey	THM	1.8 km	MPC · JPL
586234	2002 EY_{170}	—	January 24, 2007	Mount Lemmon	Mount Lemmon Survey	·	2.0 km	MPC · JPL
586235	2002 EJ_{171}	—	June 5, 2014	Haleakala	Pan-STARRS 1	·	2.2 km	MPC · JPL
586236	2002 FJ_{19}	—	March 18, 2002	Kitt Peak	Deep Ecliptic Survey	L4 · ERY	6.3 km	MPC · JPL
586237	2002 FA_{31}	—	March 21, 2002	Palomar	NEAT	·	1.7 km	MPC · JPL
586238	2002 FB_{31}	—	March 21, 2002	Palomar	NEAT	·	2.8 km	MPC · JPL
586239	2002 FB_{33}	—	February 25, 2002	Palomar	NEAT	H	440 m	MPC · JPL
586240	2002 FE_{42}	—	October 17, 2010	Mount Lemmon	Mount Lemmon Survey	L4	6.5 km	MPC · JPL
586241	2002 FF_{42}	—	March 20, 2002	Kitt Peak	Spacewatch	MAS	590 m	MPC · JPL
586242	2002 FS_{43}	—	April 13, 2011	Kitt Peak	Spacewatch	·	1.4 km	MPC · JPL
586243	2002 GN_{14}	—	March 6, 2002	Socorro	LINEAR	PHO	1.1 km	MPC · JPL
586244	2002 GZ_{26}	—	April 4, 2002	Palomar	NEAT	·	1.7 km	MPC · JPL
586245	2002 GW_{35}	—	April 2, 2002	Kitt Peak	Spacewatch	·	1.3 km	MPC · JPL
586246	2002 GU_{43}	—	April 4, 2002	Palomar	NEAT	·	1.6 km	MPC · JPL
586247	2002 GK_{51}	—	April 5, 2002	Palomar	NEAT	·	3.9 km	MPC · JPL
586248	2002 GP_{97}	—	April 4, 2002	Palomar	NEAT	·	1.6 km	MPC · JPL
586249	2002 GO_{124}	—	April 12, 2002	Kitt Peak	Spacewatch	·	1.5 km	MPC · JPL
586250	2002 GH_{181}	—	April 2, 2002	Palomar	NEAT	·	2.0 km	MPC · JPL
586251	2002 GU_{182}	—	April 15, 2002	Palomar	NEAT	·	2.8 km	MPC · JPL
586252	2002 GM_{184}	—	April 8, 2002	Kitt Peak	Spacewatch	·	2.4 km	MPC · JPL
586253	2002 GF_{185}	—	March 3, 2009	Mount Lemmon	Mount Lemmon Survey	MAS	650 m	MPC · JPL
586254	2002 GA_{187}	—	March 1, 2009	Kitt Peak	Spacewatch	·	750 m	MPC · JPL
586255	2002 GR_{187}	—	September 7, 2004	Kitt Peak	Spacewatch	EUN	1.2 km	MPC · JPL
586256	2002 GW_{190}	—	March 16, 2002	Kitt Peak	Spacewatch	·	940 m	MPC · JPL
586257	2002 GQ_{191}	—	January 28, 2011	Kitt Peak	Spacewatch	·	2.6 km	MPC · JPL
586258	2002 GJ_{192}	—	September 17, 2010	Mount Lemmon	Mount Lemmon Survey	·	3.1 km	MPC · JPL
586259	2002 GK_{192}	—	March 16, 2009	Mount Bigelow	CSS	·	1.2 km	MPC · JPL
586260	2002 GT_{192}	—	February 7, 2013	Kitt Peak	Spacewatch	·	2.4 km	MPC · JPL
586261	2002 GX_{192}	—	August 6, 2012	Haleakala	Pan-STARRS 1	·	1.5 km	MPC · JPL
586262	2002 GY_{192}	—	January 6, 2006	Anderson Mesa	LONEOS	·	1.4 km	MPC · JPL
586263	2002 GF_{193}	—	April 15, 2013	Haleakala	Pan-STARRS 1	·	840 m	MPC · JPL
586264	2002 GL_{194}	—	January 20, 2013	Mount Lemmon	Mount Lemmon Survey	L4	7.2 km	MPC · JPL
586265	2002 GH_{195}	—	October 23, 2003	Kitt Peak	Spacewatch	·	850 m	MPC · JPL
586266	2002 GM_{196}	—	April 10, 2013	Haleakala	Pan-STARRS 1	·	2.3 km	MPC · JPL
586267	2002 GF_{197}	—	October 23, 2008	Kitt Peak	Spacewatch	·	1.2 km	MPC · JPL
586268	2002 HZ_{18}	—	January 21, 2013	Haleakala	Pan-STARRS 1	NYS	1.1 km	MPC · JPL
586269	2002 HC_{19}	—	March 13, 2007	Kitt Peak	Spacewatch	·	1.9 km	MPC · JPL
586270	2002 JT_{152}	—	April 16, 2013	Haleakala	Pan-STARRS 1	·	700 m	MPC · JPL
586271	2002 KS_{17}	—	January 27, 2012	Mount Lemmon	Mount Lemmon Survey	·	2.5 km	MPC · JPL
586272	2002 KV_{17}	—	May 18, 2002	Kitt Peak	Spacewatch	·	1.4 km	MPC · JPL
586273	2002 LM_{57}	—	June 11, 2002	Kitt Peak	Spacewatch	·	1.9 km	MPC · JPL
586274	2002 LS_{65}	—	November 27, 2014	Haleakala	Pan-STARRS 1	·	1.1 km	MPC · JPL
586275	2002 MQ_{6}	—	May 3, 2006	Kitt Peak	Spacewatch	GEF	1.1 km	MPC · JPL
586276	2002 NE_{2}	—	July 3, 2002	Palomar	NEAT	·	1.1 km	MPC · JPL
586277	2002 NN_{16}	—	June 16, 2002	Palomar	NEAT	·	1.4 km	MPC · JPL
586278	2002 NB_{71}	—	July 9, 2002	Palomar	NEAT	·	1.3 km	MPC · JPL
586279	2002 NW_{77}	—	May 21, 2011	Mount Lemmon	Mount Lemmon Survey	·	1.5 km	MPC · JPL
586280	2002 NZ_{78}	—	January 23, 2006	Mount Lemmon	Mount Lemmon Survey	·	3.5 km	MPC · JPL
586281	2002 NF_{82}	—	September 20, 2007	Catalina	CSS	GEF	1.0 km	MPC · JPL
586282	2002 OY_{19}	—	July 22, 2002	Palomar	NEAT	·	2.0 km	MPC · JPL
586283	2002 OF_{33}	—	July 18, 2002	Palomar	NEAT	·	2.2 km	MPC · JPL
586284	2002 ON_{35}	—	July 19, 2002	Palomar	NEAT	·	1.7 km	MPC · JPL
586285	2002 OJ_{38}	—	July 17, 2010	Siding Spring	SSS	H	450 m	MPC · JPL
586286	2002 PX_{18}	—	August 6, 2002	Palomar	NEAT	·	2.6 km	MPC · JPL
586287	2002 PU_{158}	—	August 8, 2002	Palomar	NEAT	H	470 m	MPC · JPL
586288	2002 PQ_{190}	—	August 15, 2002	Palomar	NEAT	·	2.0 km	MPC · JPL
586289	2002 PX_{193}	—	May 6, 2006	Mount Lemmon	Mount Lemmon Survey	·	1.5 km	MPC · JPL
586290	2002 PH_{200}	—	August 13, 2002	Palomar	NEAT	·	1.6 km	MPC · JPL
586291	2002 PQ_{200}	—	August 11, 2002	Palomar	NEAT	·	2.0 km	MPC · JPL
586292	2002 PC_{202}	—	March 8, 2005	Mount Lemmon	Mount Lemmon Survey	·	1.9 km	MPC · JPL
586293	2002 PU_{202}	—	August 19, 2002	Palomar	NEAT	·	1.6 km	MPC · JPL
586294	2002 PZ_{203}	—	December 24, 2013	Mount Lemmon	Mount Lemmon Survey	·	1.8 km	MPC · JPL
586295	2002 PS_{204}	—	May 31, 2006	Kitt Peak	Spacewatch	GEF	910 m	MPC · JPL
586296	2002 QG_{57}	—	August 17, 2002	Palomar	NEAT	·	1.0 km	MPC · JPL
586297	2002 QZ_{58}	—	August 27, 2002	Palomar	NEAT	·	1.9 km	MPC · JPL
586298	2002 QE_{63}	—	August 17, 2002	Palomar	NEAT	·	1.5 km	MPC · JPL
586299	2002 QL_{106}	—	August 30, 2002	Palomar	NEAT	·	1.9 km	MPC · JPL
586300	2002 QX_{110}	—	August 6, 2002	Palomar	NEAT	·	2.3 km	MPC · JPL

== 586301–586400 ==
back to top

Designation			Discovery			Properties		Ref
Permanent	Provisional	Named after	Date	Site	Discoverer(s)	Category	Diam.	Ref
586301	2002 QF_{114}	—	August 28, 2002	Palomar	NEAT	·	2.0 km	MPC · JPL
586302	2002 QG_{135}	—	August 30, 2002	Palomar	NEAT	·	2.0 km	MPC · JPL
586303	2002 QL_{144}	—	April 5, 2005	Mount Lemmon	Mount Lemmon Survey	·	1.8 km	MPC · JPL
586304	2002 QB_{155}	—	December 17, 2003	Kitt Peak	Spacewatch	·	1.6 km	MPC · JPL
586305	2002 QD_{158}	—	March 10, 2005	Mount Lemmon	Mount Lemmon Survey	·	930 m	MPC · JPL
586306	2002 QU_{158}	—	September 15, 2006	Kitt Peak	Spacewatch	·	930 m	MPC · JPL
586307	2002 QQ_{159}	—	August 29, 2002	Kitt Peak	Spacewatch	·	870 m	MPC · JPL
586308	2002 RX	—	August 14, 2002	Palomar	NEAT	·	1.5 km	MPC · JPL
586309	2002 RR_{147}	—	August 30, 2002	Kitt Peak	Spacewatch	·	1.0 km	MPC · JPL
586310	2002 RU_{182}	—	September 11, 2002	Palomar	NEAT	H	460 m	MPC · JPL
586311	2002 RT_{230}	—	September 7, 2002	Socorro	LINEAR	·	940 m	MPC · JPL
586312	2002 RO_{232}	—	September 11, 2002	Palomar	NEAT	·	1.1 km	MPC · JPL
586313	2002 RZ_{233}	—	October 10, 2002	Kitt Peak	Spacewatch	·	1.8 km	MPC · JPL
586314	2002 RK_{274}	—	September 4, 2002	Palomar	NEAT	·	920 m	MPC · JPL
586315	2002 RH_{284}	—	March 16, 2005	Kitt Peak	Spacewatch	·	1.9 km	MPC · JPL
586316	2002 RH_{287}	—	September 14, 2007	Mount Lemmon	Mount Lemmon Survey	·	1.5 km	MPC · JPL
586317	2002 RS_{287}	—	October 10, 2007	Kitt Peak	Spacewatch	·	1.9 km	MPC · JPL
586318	2002 RC_{289}	—	June 17, 2005	Mount Lemmon	Mount Lemmon Survey	·	630 m	MPC · JPL
586319	2002 RN_{289}	—	September 1, 2002	Palomar	NEAT	H	500 m	MPC · JPL
586320	2002 RB_{291}	—	September 9, 2002	Palomar	NEAT	·	1.5 km	MPC · JPL
586321	2002 RA_{297}	—	April 18, 2015	Haleakala	Pan-STARRS 1	·	2.0 km	MPC · JPL
586322	2002 SF_{18}	—	September 28, 2002	Palomar	NEAT	·	1.6 km	MPC · JPL
586323	2002 SJ_{40}	—	September 5, 2002	Socorro	LINEAR	·	1.6 km	MPC · JPL
586324	2002 SS_{59}	—	September 16, 2002	Haleakala	NEAT	·	1.0 km	MPC · JPL
586325	2002 SG_{64}	—	September 16, 2002	Palomar	NEAT	·	1.2 km	MPC · JPL
586326	2002 SU_{64}	—	September 27, 2002	Palomar	NEAT	H	460 m	MPC · JPL
586327	2002 SF_{69}	—	September 26, 2002	Palomar	NEAT	·	1.6 km	MPC · JPL
586328	2002 TE_{10}	—	October 1, 2002	Haleakala	NEAT	·	1.5 km	MPC · JPL
586329	2002 TU_{58}	—	October 4, 2002	Socorro	LINEAR	H	510 m	MPC · JPL
586330	2002 TT_{70}	—	September 12, 2002	Palomar	NEAT	·	1.1 km	MPC · JPL
586331	2002 TU_{106}	—	October 4, 2002	Socorro	LINEAR	·	960 m	MPC · JPL
586332	2002 TG_{109}	—	October 2, 2002	Haleakala	NEAT	H	580 m	MPC · JPL
586333	2002 TF_{127}	—	October 4, 2002	Palomar	NEAT	·	1.9 km	MPC · JPL
586334	2002 TQ_{146}	—	October 4, 2002	Socorro	LINEAR	·	1.3 km	MPC · JPL
586335	2002 TC_{153}	—	October 5, 2002	Palomar	NEAT	H	430 m	MPC · JPL
586336	2002 TV_{162}	—	October 5, 2002	Palomar	NEAT	BRA	1.6 km	MPC · JPL
586337	2002 TD_{193}	—	October 3, 2002	Palomar	NEAT	PHO	930 m	MPC · JPL
586338	2002 TV_{212}	—	October 8, 2002	Palomar	NEAT	·	2.5 km	MPC · JPL
586339	2002 TZ_{212}	—	October 8, 2002	Palomar	NEAT	·	3.4 km	MPC · JPL
586340	2002 TP_{233}	—	October 6, 2002	Socorro	LINEAR	PHO	810 m	MPC · JPL
586341	2002 TR_{278}	—	October 5, 2002	Socorro	LINEAR	·	1.1 km	MPC · JPL
586342	2002 TQ_{388}	—	October 10, 2002	Palomar	NEAT	·	2.2 km	MPC · JPL
586343	2002 TU_{388}	—	October 13, 2002	Palomar	NEAT	·	1.3 km	MPC · JPL
586344	2002 TD_{389}	—	August 9, 2013	Kitt Peak	Spacewatch	V	650 m	MPC · JPL
586345	2002 TV_{391}	—	April 3, 2011	Haleakala	Pan-STARRS 1	·	540 m	MPC · JPL
586346	2002 TD_{393}	—	December 21, 2014	Haleakala	Pan-STARRS 1	·	1.0 km	MPC · JPL
586347	2002 UW_{30}	—	October 30, 2002	Haleakala	NEAT	PHO	830 m	MPC · JPL
586348	2002 UW_{34}	—	October 31, 2002	Socorro	LINEAR	DOR	2.6 km	MPC · JPL
586349	2002 UK_{36}	—	October 31, 2002	Palomar	NEAT	·	1.4 km	MPC · JPL
586350	2002 UJ_{80}	—	May 9, 2005	Mount Lemmon	Mount Lemmon Survey	·	2.0 km	MPC · JPL
586351	2002 UO_{80}	—	September 27, 2009	Mount Lemmon	Mount Lemmon Survey	·	740 m	MPC · JPL
586352	2002 UX_{80}	—	November 9, 2007	Kitt Peak	Spacewatch	AGN	1.0 km	MPC · JPL
586353	2002 VW_{128}	—	November 4, 2002	Kitt Peak	Spacewatch	·	1.7 km	MPC · JPL
586354	2002 VT_{145}	—	November 15, 2002	Palomar	NEAT	·	1.1 km	MPC · JPL
586355	2002 VX_{150}	—	November 16, 2006	Kitt Peak	Spacewatch	·	870 m	MPC · JPL
586356	2002 VC_{153}	—	November 13, 2015	Kitt Peak	Spacewatch	·	620 m	MPC · JPL
586357	2002 WB_{2}	—	November 23, 2002	Palomar	NEAT	·	2.0 km	MPC · JPL
586358	2002 WG_{7}	—	November 24, 2002	Palomar	NEAT	MAS	790 m	MPC · JPL
586359	2002 WE_{23}	—	November 24, 2002	Palomar	NEAT	PHO	680 m	MPC · JPL
586360	2002 WY_{25}	—	November 16, 2002	Palomar	NEAT	·	1.8 km	MPC · JPL
586361	2002 WA_{29}	—	November 23, 2002	Palomar	NEAT	·	1.2 km	MPC · JPL
586362	2002 WV_{30}	—	November 24, 2002	Palomar	NEAT	·	2.1 km	MPC · JPL
586363	2002 XF_{56}	—	November 13, 2002	Palomar	NEAT	·	540 m	MPC · JPL
586364	2002 XP_{121}	—	December 11, 2006	Kitt Peak	Spacewatch	·	840 m	MPC · JPL
586365	2002 XF_{123}	—	September 18, 2009	Kitt Peak	Spacewatch	·	980 m	MPC · JPL
586366	2003 AL_{95}	—	August 15, 2013	Haleakala	Pan-STARRS 1	·	840 m	MPC · JPL
586367	2003 BU_{3}	—	January 24, 2003	La Silla	A. Boattini, Hainaut, O.	·	1.5 km	MPC · JPL
586368	2003 BX_{94}	—	February 7, 2003	Palomar	NEAT	·	740 m	MPC · JPL
586369	2003 BU_{97}	—	December 25, 2010	Mount Lemmon	Mount Lemmon Survey	·	880 m	MPC · JPL
586370	2003 BJ_{99}	—	May 1, 2012	Mount Lemmon	Mount Lemmon Survey	·	920 m	MPC · JPL
586371	2003 BR_{99}	—	November 2, 2008	Mount Lemmon	Mount Lemmon Survey	·	650 m	MPC · JPL
586372	2003 BW_{100}	—	December 30, 2007	Mount Lemmon	Mount Lemmon Survey	·	1.5 km	MPC · JPL
586373	2003 CX_{27}	—	July 14, 2015	Haleakala	Pan-STARRS 1	·	1.5 km	MPC · JPL
586374	2003 DH_{7}	—	February 23, 2003	Campo Imperatore	CINEOS	·	2.0 km	MPC · JPL
586375	2003 DU_{22}	—	February 28, 2003	Cerro Tololo	Deep Lens Survey	L4 · ERY	6.7 km	MPC · JPL
586376	2003 EP_{10}	—	February 9, 2003	Haleakala	NEAT	·	2.6 km	MPC · JPL
586377	2003 EE_{64}	—	March 12, 2003	Kitt Peak	Spacewatch	·	1.2 km	MPC · JPL
586378	2003 ES_{64}	—	March 11, 2003	Kitt Peak	Spacewatch	·	1.0 km	MPC · JPL
586379	2003 FO_{87}	—	October 15, 2001	Palomar	NEAT	(5)	1.2 km	MPC · JPL
586380	2003 FA_{102}	—	March 26, 2003	Palomar	NEAT	·	1.2 km	MPC · JPL
586381	2003 FO_{122}	—	March 31, 2003	Cerro Tololo	Deep Lens Survey	·	1.1 km	MPC · JPL
586382	2003 FU_{134}	—	October 12, 2005	Kitt Peak	Spacewatch	·	3.3 km	MPC · JPL
586383	2003 FO_{135}	—	February 10, 2008	Kitt Peak	Spacewatch	·	2.8 km	MPC · JPL
586384	2003 FG_{136}	—	March 4, 2010	Kitt Peak	Spacewatch	·	540 m	MPC · JPL
586385	2003 FV_{137}	—	December 25, 1995	Kitt Peak	Spacewatch	·	780 m	MPC · JPL
586386	2003 FJ_{138}	—	December 14, 2010	Mount Lemmon	Mount Lemmon Survey	L4	8.2 km	MPC · JPL
586387	2003 FR_{139}	—	August 27, 2005	Palomar	NEAT	EOS	1.5 km	MPC · JPL
586388	2003 FF_{141}	—	March 24, 2003	Kitt Peak	Spacewatch	·	630 m	MPC · JPL
586389	2003 FJ_{141}	—	March 26, 2003	Kitt Peak	Spacewatch	·	1.0 km	MPC · JPL
586390	2003 GY_{13}	—	April 4, 2003	Kitt Peak	Spacewatch	·	1.3 km	MPC · JPL
586391	2003 GC_{39}	—	April 9, 2003	Kitt Peak	Spacewatch	·	1.7 km	MPC · JPL
586392	2003 GR_{57}	—	September 16, 2009	Kitt Peak	Spacewatch	L4	9.4 km	MPC · JPL
586393	2003 GS_{57}	—	April 7, 2003	Kitt Peak	Spacewatch	L4	10 km	MPC · JPL
586394	2003 GO_{58}	—	April 29, 2014	Haleakala	Pan-STARRS 1	·	2.3 km	MPC · JPL
586395	2003 GS_{58}	—	November 27, 2013	Haleakala	Pan-STARRS 1	·	1.4 km	MPC · JPL
586396	2003 GW_{58}	—	October 20, 2011	Catalina	CSS	·	2.2 km	MPC · JPL
586397	2003 GE_{59}	—	April 10, 2010	Mount Lemmon	Mount Lemmon Survey	·	640 m	MPC · JPL
586398	2003 GT_{59}	—	October 5, 2013	Haleakala	Pan-STARRS 1	·	2.1 km	MPC · JPL
586399	2003 GU_{59}	—	July 25, 2014	Haleakala	Pan-STARRS 1	·	530 m	MPC · JPL
586400	2003 GS_{61}	—	December 7, 2005	Kitt Peak	Spacewatch	·	1.2 km	MPC · JPL

== 586401–586500 ==
back to top

Designation			Discovery			Properties		Ref
Permanent	Provisional	Named after	Date	Site	Discoverer(s)	Category	Diam.	Ref
586401	2003 GP_{64}	—	March 25, 2003	Palomar	NEAT	BRG	1.8 km	MPC · JPL
586402	2003 GQ_{64}	—	February 8, 2008	Mount Lemmon	Mount Lemmon Survey	·	1.9 km	MPC · JPL
586403	2003 GR_{64}	—	February 9, 2008	Mount Lemmon	Mount Lemmon Survey	EOS	1.3 km	MPC · JPL
586404	2003 GT_{64}	—	October 24, 2013	Mount Lemmon	Mount Lemmon Survey	(5)	820 m	MPC · JPL
586405	2003 GZ_{65}	—	April 8, 2003	Kitt Peak	Spacewatch	·	550 m	MPC · JPL
586406	2003 HG_{59}	—	April 29, 2003	Kitt Peak	Spacewatch	EOS	1.7 km	MPC · JPL
586407	2003 HT_{59}	—	September 17, 2013	Mount Lemmon	Mount Lemmon Survey	·	1.4 km	MPC · JPL
586408	2003 HY_{59}	—	April 25, 2003	Kitt Peak	Spacewatch	·	1.5 km	MPC · JPL
586409	2003 HL_{60}	—	January 25, 2015	Haleakala	Pan-STARRS 1	·	1.1 km	MPC · JPL
586410	2003 HR_{60}	—	November 18, 2011	Kitt Peak	Spacewatch	L4	10 km	MPC · JPL
586411	2003 HX_{62}	—	November 30, 2011	Mount Lemmon	Mount Lemmon Survey	EOS	2.2 km	MPC · JPL
586412	2003 HL_{64}	—	April 30, 2003	Kitt Peak	Spacewatch	·	1.3 km	MPC · JPL
586413	2003 JX	—	May 1, 2003	Kitt Peak	Spacewatch	·	1.3 km	MPC · JPL
586414	2003 JV_{18}	—	May 2, 2003	Kitt Peak	Spacewatch	EOS	1.8 km	MPC · JPL
586415	2003 JW_{18}	—	May 2, 2003	Kitt Peak	Spacewatch	EOS	2.1 km	MPC · JPL
586416	2003 JZ_{18}	—	September 13, 2005	Kitt Peak	Spacewatch	EOS	1.7 km	MPC · JPL
586417	2003 JM_{19}	—	November 8, 2013	Mount Lemmon	Mount Lemmon Survey	MAR	730 m	MPC · JPL
586418	2003 KR_{1}	—	May 22, 2003	Kitt Peak	Spacewatch	LIX	3.2 km	MPC · JPL
586419	2003 KU_{1}	—	May 22, 2003	Kitt Peak	Spacewatch	·	2.4 km	MPC · JPL
586420	2003 KV_{11}	—	May 26, 2003	Kitt Peak	Spacewatch	·	3.1 km	MPC · JPL
586421	2003 KY_{28}	—	May 22, 2003	Kitt Peak	Spacewatch	·	1.2 km	MPC · JPL
586422	2003 KW_{29}	—	January 26, 2006	Mount Lemmon	Mount Lemmon Survey	·	650 m	MPC · JPL
586423	2003 KL_{33}	—	May 27, 2003	Kitt Peak	Spacewatch	·	2.5 km	MPC · JPL
586424	2003 KL_{38}	—	April 29, 2014	Haleakala	Pan-STARRS 1	·	2.3 km	MPC · JPL
586425	2003 LT_{1}	—	June 3, 2003	Kitt Peak	Spacewatch	H	370 m	MPC · JPL
586426	2003 LV_{9}	—	January 27, 2007	Mount Lemmon	Mount Lemmon Survey	·	2.4 km	MPC · JPL
586427	2003 LB_{10}	—	September 17, 2009	Mount Lemmon	Mount Lemmon Survey	·	1.5 km	MPC · JPL
586428	2003 LE_{10}	—	October 10, 2008	Kitt Peak	Spacewatch	·	1.4 km	MPC · JPL
586429	2003 LN_{10}	—	October 28, 2011	Mount Lemmon	Mount Lemmon Survey	·	2.4 km	MPC · JPL
586430	2003 OD_{34}	—	August 23, 2003	Palomar	NEAT	·	620 m	MPC · JPL
586431	2003 QJ	—	July 8, 2003	Palomar	NEAT	H	410 m	MPC · JPL
586432	2003 QN_{9}	—	August 20, 2003	Campo Imperatore	CINEOS	·	900 m	MPC · JPL
586433	2003 QZ_{83}	—	August 24, 2003	Cerro Tololo	Deep Ecliptic Survey	·	2.7 km	MPC · JPL
586434	2003 QD_{86}	—	August 25, 2003	Cerro Tololo	Deep Ecliptic Survey	EOS	1.7 km	MPC · JPL
586435	2003 QS_{105}	—	July 7, 2003	Palomar	NEAT	·	1.8 km	MPC · JPL
586436	2003 QV_{120}	—	August 26, 2003	Cerro Tololo	Deep Ecliptic Survey	·	1.2 km	MPC · JPL
586437	2003 QA_{121}	—	August 25, 2003	Cerro Tololo	Deep Ecliptic Survey	·	950 m	MPC · JPL
586438	2003 QF_{121}	—	September 22, 2014	Haleakala	Pan-STARRS 1	·	630 m	MPC · JPL
586439	2003 QU_{123}	—	February 3, 2009	Mount Lemmon	Mount Lemmon Survey	·	820 m	MPC · JPL
586440	2003 QV_{123}	—	January 30, 2009	Mount Lemmon	Mount Lemmon Survey	·	750 m	MPC · JPL
586441	2003 RP_{28}	—	September 4, 2003	Kitt Peak	Spacewatch	·	720 m	MPC · JPL
586442	2003 SK_{29}	—	September 18, 2003	Palomar	NEAT	·	1.0 km	MPC · JPL
586443	2003 SL_{34}	—	September 18, 2003	Kitt Peak	Spacewatch	·	560 m	MPC · JPL
586444	2003 SO_{35}	—	September 18, 2003	Palomar	NEAT	NYS	1.1 km	MPC · JPL
586445	2003 SZ_{60}	—	August 23, 2003	Palomar	NEAT	·	1.7 km	MPC · JPL
586446	2003 SK_{79}	—	September 19, 2003	Kitt Peak	Spacewatch	·	1.5 km	MPC · JPL
586447	2003 SL_{98}	—	September 16, 2003	Palomar	NEAT	·	1.6 km	MPC · JPL
586448	2003 SN_{108}	—	September 20, 2003	Palomar	NEAT	H	420 m	MPC · JPL
586449	2003 SV_{133}	—	September 18, 2003	Palomar	NEAT	·	1.9 km	MPC · JPL
586450	2003 SZ_{187}	—	September 16, 2003	Kitt Peak	Spacewatch	·	1.5 km	MPC · JPL
586451	2003 SE_{278}	—	September 19, 2003	Palomar	NEAT	H	450 m	MPC · JPL
586452	2003 SX_{289}	—	September 28, 2003	Anderson Mesa	LONEOS	·	2.0 km	MPC · JPL
586453	2003 SE_{332}	—	September 28, 2003	Anderson Mesa	LONEOS	PHO	1.1 km	MPC · JPL
586454	2003 SY_{334}	—	September 26, 2003	Apache Point	SDSS Collaboration	·	2.3 km	MPC · JPL
586455	2003 SP_{335}	—	September 26, 2003	Apache Point	SDSS Collaboration	·	1.7 km	MPC · JPL
586456	2003 SR_{357}	—	September 20, 2003	Kitt Peak	Spacewatch	·	1.7 km	MPC · JPL
586457	2003 SB_{359}	—	September 21, 2003	Kitt Peak	Spacewatch	·	1.2 km	MPC · JPL
586458	2003 SU_{361}	—	September 22, 2003	Kitt Peak	Spacewatch	·	980 m	MPC · JPL
586459	2003 SW_{362}	—	September 22, 2003	Kitt Peak	Spacewatch	·	1.1 km	MPC · JPL
586460	2003 SW_{364}	—	September 16, 2003	Kitt Peak	Spacewatch	·	780 m	MPC · JPL
586461	2003 SG_{366}	—	September 19, 2003	Kitt Peak	Spacewatch	·	1.3 km	MPC · JPL
586462	2003 SA_{368}	—	September 26, 2003	Apache Point	SDSS Collaboration	·	1.5 km	MPC · JPL
586463	2003 SO_{376}	—	September 26, 2003	Apache Point	SDSS Collaboration	·	2.0 km	MPC · JPL
586464	2003 SB_{379}	—	September 26, 2003	Apache Point	SDSS Collaboration	(12739)	1.4 km	MPC · JPL
586465	2003 SH_{385}	—	September 26, 2003	Apache Point	SDSS Collaboration	·	2.2 km	MPC · JPL
586466	2003 SQ_{386}	—	October 2, 2003	Kitt Peak	Spacewatch	·	770 m	MPC · JPL
586467	2003 SN_{390}	—	September 26, 2003	Apache Point	SDSS Collaboration	·	1.4 km	MPC · JPL
586468	2003 SE_{392}	—	September 26, 2003	Apache Point	SDSS Collaboration	·	1.2 km	MPC · JPL
586469	2003 SD_{394}	—	September 26, 2003	Apache Point	SDSS Collaboration	PAD	1.7 km	MPC · JPL
586470	2003 SS_{397}	—	September 26, 2003	Apache Point	SDSS Collaboration	·	1.6 km	MPC · JPL
586471	2003 SZ_{398}	—	September 26, 2003	Apache Point	SDSS Collaboration	·	1.7 km	MPC · JPL
586472	2003 SK_{400}	—	September 26, 2003	Apache Point	SDSS	·	2.3 km	MPC · JPL
586473	2003 SY_{400}	—	March 11, 2005	Catalina	CSS	·	1.2 km	MPC · JPL
586474	2003 SH_{407}	—	September 27, 2003	Apache Point	SDSS Collaboration	·	1.8 km	MPC · JPL
586475	2003 SS_{407}	—	September 27, 2003	Apache Point	SDSS Collaboration	·	1.7 km	MPC · JPL
586476	2003 SL_{408}	—	September 28, 2003	Kitt Peak	Spacewatch	·	4.5 km	MPC · JPL
586477	2003 SB_{414}	—	September 29, 2003	Kitt Peak	Spacewatch	·	1.6 km	MPC · JPL
586478	2003 SV_{417}	—	September 28, 2003	Apache Point	SDSS Collaboration	·	930 m	MPC · JPL
586479	2003 SK_{424}	—	September 29, 2003	Apache Point	SDSS Collaboration	AGN	1.1 km	MPC · JPL
586480	2003 SV_{432}	—	September 25, 2003	Haleakala	NEAT	·	2.4 km	MPC · JPL
586481	2003 SF_{436}	—	September 30, 2003	Kitt Peak	Spacewatch	HOF	2.4 km	MPC · JPL
586482	2003 SX_{436}	—	September 22, 2003	Kitt Peak	Spacewatch	·	1.8 km	MPC · JPL
586483	2003 SH_{437}	—	November 17, 2008	Kitt Peak	Spacewatch	·	1.5 km	MPC · JPL
586484	2003 SL_{437}	—	November 9, 2007	Mount Lemmon	Mount Lemmon Survey	·	860 m	MPC · JPL
586485	2003 ST_{439}	—	February 13, 2010	Mount Lemmon	Mount Lemmon Survey	·	1.4 km	MPC · JPL
586486	2003 SB_{440}	—	November 20, 2008	Mount Lemmon	Mount Lemmon Survey	·	1.7 km	MPC · JPL
586487	2003 SD_{440}	—	September 29, 2003	Kitt Peak	Spacewatch	·	770 m	MPC · JPL
586488	2003 SU_{441}	—	February 1, 2012	Mount Lemmon	Mount Lemmon Survey	·	870 m	MPC · JPL
586489	2003 SJ_{450}	—	August 7, 2016	Haleakala	Pan-STARRS 1	GEF	1.1 km	MPC · JPL
586490	2003 SS_{451}	—	October 27, 2008	Mount Lemmon	Mount Lemmon Survey	·	1.4 km	MPC · JPL
586491	2003 SZ_{451}	—	January 21, 2012	Kitt Peak	Spacewatch	·	2.7 km	MPC · JPL
586492	2003 SV_{452}	—	September 17, 2003	Kitt Peak	Spacewatch	·	720 m	MPC · JPL
586493	2003 SC_{454}	—	October 8, 2008	Mount Lemmon	Mount Lemmon Survey	·	1.5 km	MPC · JPL
586494	2003 SM_{457}	—	February 4, 2006	Mount Lemmon	Mount Lemmon Survey	·	2.3 km	MPC · JPL
586495	2003 SS_{458}	—	September 19, 2003	Kitt Peak	Spacewatch	·	500 m	MPC · JPL
586496	2003 SN_{459}	—	September 30, 2003	Kitt Peak	Spacewatch	·	1.7 km	MPC · JPL
586497	2003 SP_{462}	—	March 10, 2005	Mount Lemmon	Mount Lemmon Survey	·	690 m	MPC · JPL
586498	2003 SF_{463}	—	September 28, 2003	Kitt Peak	Spacewatch	·	530 m	MPC · JPL
586499	2003 SV_{464}	—	September 18, 2003	Kitt Peak	Spacewatch	NEM	1.7 km	MPC · JPL
586500	2003 SF_{471}	—	September 30, 2003	Kitt Peak	Spacewatch	NEM	1.4 km	MPC · JPL

== 586501–586600 ==
back to top

Designation			Discovery			Properties		Ref
Permanent	Provisional	Named after	Date	Site	Discoverer(s)	Category	Diam.	Ref
586501	2003 TP_{8}	—	October 2, 2003	Kitt Peak	Spacewatch	·	2.1 km	MPC · JPL
586502	2003 TV_{9}	—	October 15, 2003	Sandlot	G. Hug	·	940 m	MPC · JPL
586503	2003 TU_{24}	—	October 1, 2003	Kitt Peak	Spacewatch	V	630 m	MPC · JPL
586504	2003 TD_{32}	—	September 16, 2003	Kitt Peak	Spacewatch	EUN	960 m	MPC · JPL
586505	2003 TP_{60}	—	October 2, 2003	Kitt Peak	Spacewatch	MAS	510 m	MPC · JPL
586506	2003 TT_{60}	—	February 18, 2014	Mount Lemmon	Mount Lemmon Survey	·	1.7 km	MPC · JPL
586507	2003 TW_{60}	—	October 1, 2003	Kitt Peak	Spacewatch	·	1.6 km	MPC · JPL
586508	2003 UF_{3}	—	October 17, 2003	Kitt Peak	Spacewatch	H	390 m	MPC · JPL
586509	2003 UO_{17}	—	October 18, 2003	Kitt Peak	Spacewatch	·	1.5 km	MPC · JPL
586510	2003 UT_{31}	—	September 28, 2003	Kitt Peak	Spacewatch	·	760 m	MPC · JPL
586511	2003 UN_{33}	—	October 1, 2003	Kitt Peak	Spacewatch	·	1.9 km	MPC · JPL
586512	2003 UW_{89}	—	October 20, 2003	Palomar	NEAT	·	1.8 km	MPC · JPL
586513	2003 UG_{95}	—	September 28, 2003	Socorro	LINEAR	·	1.5 km	MPC · JPL
586514	2003 UG_{109}	—	October 19, 2003	Palomar	NEAT	·	2.4 km	MPC · JPL
586515	2003 UO_{133}	—	October 16, 2003	Anderson Mesa	LONEOS	·	1.6 km	MPC · JPL
586516	2003 UY_{135}	—	October 21, 2003	Palomar	NEAT	·	2.2 km	MPC · JPL
586517	2003 UE_{157}	—	September 22, 2003	Kitt Peak	Spacewatch	·	1.6 km	MPC · JPL
586518	2003 UF_{215}	—	September 28, 2003	Kitt Peak	Spacewatch	·	1.4 km	MPC · JPL
586519	2003 US_{231}	—	September 27, 2003	Kitt Peak	Spacewatch	·	1.5 km	MPC · JPL
586520	2003 UW_{248}	—	October 20, 2003	Kitt Peak	Spacewatch	·	1.9 km	MPC · JPL
586521	2003 UN_{262}	—	October 19, 2003	Haleakala	NEAT	·	2.7 km	MPC · JPL
586522	2003 UD_{305}	—	October 18, 2003	Kitt Peak	Spacewatch	·	2.0 km	MPC · JPL
586523	2003 UD_{324}	—	September 16, 2003	Kitt Peak	Spacewatch	·	1.4 km	MPC · JPL
586524	2003 UA_{334}	—	September 29, 2003	Kitt Peak	Spacewatch	·	1.6 km	MPC · JPL
586525	2003 UZ_{347}	—	October 19, 2003	Apache Point	SDSS	·	830 m	MPC · JPL
586526	2003 UF_{355}	—	October 23, 2003	Kitt Peak	Spacewatch	·	1.1 km	MPC · JPL
586527	2003 UM_{355}	—	October 19, 2003	Apache Point	SDSS	·	950 m	MPC · JPL
586528	2003 UY_{378}	—	October 20, 2003	Kitt Peak	Spacewatch	PHO	900 m	MPC · JPL
586529	2003 UB_{379}	—	September 27, 2003	Kitt Peak	Spacewatch	·	1.4 km	MPC · JPL
586530	2003 UF_{388}	—	October 22, 2003	Kitt Peak	Spacewatch	·	1.2 km	MPC · JPL
586531	2003 UU_{390}	—	October 22, 2003	Apache Point	SDSS Collaboration	·	1.4 km	MPC · JPL
586532	2003 UW_{406}	—	October 23, 2003	Apache Point	SDSS	HOF	2.4 km	MPC · JPL
586533	2003 UR_{419}	—	October 25, 2003	Kitt Peak	Spacewatch	·	2.0 km	MPC · JPL
586534	2003 UX_{419}	—	October 19, 2003	Apache Point	SDSS Collaboration	NYS	710 m	MPC · JPL
586535	2003 UZ_{419}	—	October 21, 2003	Kitt Peak	Spacewatch	·	2.5 km	MPC · JPL
586536	2003 UN_{420}	—	October 10, 2012	Mount Lemmon	Mount Lemmon Survey	HOF	2.4 km	MPC · JPL
586537	2003 UC_{421}	—	October 19, 2003	Kitt Peak	Spacewatch	·	1.7 km	MPC · JPL
586538	2003 UK_{421}	—	September 26, 2003	Apache Point	SDSS	·	1.9 km	MPC · JPL
586539	2003 US_{421}	—	October 18, 2003	Kitt Peak	Spacewatch	·	1.6 km	MPC · JPL
586540	2003 UT_{421}	—	October 21, 2003	Kitt Peak	Spacewatch	·	1.9 km	MPC · JPL
586541	2003 UV_{421}	—	October 23, 2008	Kitt Peak	Spacewatch	·	1.7 km	MPC · JPL
586542	2003 UB_{422}	—	October 22, 2003	Kitt Peak	Spacewatch	·	860 m	MPC · JPL
586543	2003 UJ_{422}	—	November 19, 2003	Kitt Peak	Spacewatch	HOF	2.2 km	MPC · JPL
586544	2003 UU_{422}	—	October 19, 2003	Kitt Peak	Spacewatch	NYS	950 m	MPC · JPL
586545	2003 UO_{423}	—	December 22, 2008	Kitt Peak	Spacewatch	AEO	770 m	MPC · JPL
586546	2003 UP_{423}	—	October 6, 2012	Haleakala	Pan-STARRS 1	NEM	2.0 km	MPC · JPL
586547	2003 UD_{424}	—	October 17, 2003	Apache Point	SDSS Collaboration	LUT	4.0 km	MPC · JPL
586548	2003 UR_{426}	—	April 24, 2006	Kitt Peak	Spacewatch	·	840 m	MPC · JPL
586549	2003 UW_{426}	—	December 31, 2013	Kitt Peak	Spacewatch	AGN	960 m	MPC · JPL
586550	2003 UG_{434}	—	October 7, 2013	Kitt Peak	Spacewatch	·	1.6 km	MPC · JPL
586551	2003 UQ_{437}	—	October 7, 2012	Haleakala	Pan-STARRS 1	·	1.3 km	MPC · JPL
586552	2003 UP_{438}	—	February 17, 2010	Kitt Peak	Spacewatch	AGN	900 m	MPC · JPL
586553	2003 UH_{439}	—	January 28, 2014	Mount Lemmon	Mount Lemmon Survey	DOR	1.4 km	MPC · JPL
586554	2003 UN_{439}	—	July 25, 2015	Haleakala	Pan-STARRS 1	·	2.8 km	MPC · JPL
586555	2003 UD_{440}	—	February 26, 2014	Haleakala	Pan-STARRS 1	·	1.3 km	MPC · JPL
586556	2003 UX_{440}	—	January 21, 2014	Kitt Peak	Spacewatch	·	1.8 km	MPC · JPL
586557	2003 UY_{440}	—	February 21, 2009	Kitt Peak	Spacewatch	·	1.0 km	MPC · JPL
586558	2003 UA_{441}	—	October 20, 2003	Kitt Peak	Spacewatch	·	1.0 km	MPC · JPL
586559	2003 UO_{443}	—	January 16, 2013	Haleakala	Pan-STARRS 1	·	930 m	MPC · JPL
586560	2003 UM_{444}	—	October 23, 2003	Kitt Peak	Spacewatch	·	1.4 km	MPC · JPL
586561	2003 UL_{445}	—	October 19, 2003	Apache Point	SDSS Collaboration	NEM	1.8 km	MPC · JPL
586562	2003 UO_{448}	—	October 20, 2003	Kitt Peak	Spacewatch	·	1.7 km	MPC · JPL
586563	2003 WL_{32}	—	November 18, 2003	Kitt Peak	Spacewatch	·	1.0 km	MPC · JPL
586564	2003 WM_{90}	—	November 16, 2003	Kitt Peak	Spacewatch	MAS	770 m	MPC · JPL
586565	2003 WP_{129}	—	November 21, 2003	Palomar	NEAT	·	720 m	MPC · JPL
586566	2003 WZ_{161}	—	November 30, 2003	Kitt Peak	Spacewatch	KOR	1.4 km	MPC · JPL
586567	2003 WX_{177}	—	October 19, 2003	Kitt Peak	Spacewatch	(5)	550 m	MPC · JPL
586568	2003 WO_{187}	—	November 2, 2003	Kitt Peak	Spacewatch	·	1.4 km	MPC · JPL
586569	2003 WD_{188}	—	November 23, 2003	Kitt Peak	Deep Ecliptic Survey	·	610 m	MPC · JPL
586570	2003 WF_{196}	—	January 18, 2005	Kitt Peak	Spacewatch	·	2.0 km	MPC · JPL
586571	2003 WO_{196}	—	February 16, 2012	Haleakala	Pan-STARRS 1	V	580 m	MPC · JPL
586572	2003 WU_{198}	—	January 1, 2014	Haleakala	Pan-STARRS 1	·	1.8 km	MPC · JPL
586573	2003 WP_{199}	—	November 30, 2003	Kitt Peak	Spacewatch	·	2.0 km	MPC · JPL
586574	2003 WF_{200}	—	January 7, 2014	Kitt Peak	Spacewatch	·	1.6 km	MPC · JPL
586575	2003 WZ_{201}	—	March 9, 2005	Mount Lemmon	Mount Lemmon Survey	NYS	950 m	MPC · JPL
586576	2003 WS_{202}	—	September 25, 2012	Kitt Peak	Spacewatch	·	1.6 km	MPC · JPL
586577	2003 WH_{203}	—	April 2, 2009	Kitt Peak	Spacewatch	·	920 m	MPC · JPL
586578	2003 WC_{207}	—	March 17, 2005	Campo Imperatore	CINEOS	·	1.8 km	MPC · JPL
586579	2003 WM_{210}	—	November 24, 2003	Kitt Peak	Spacewatch	·	950 m	MPC · JPL
586580	2003 WA_{211}	—	March 10, 2014	Mount Lemmon	Mount Lemmon Survey	·	1.3 km	MPC · JPL
586581	2003 WZ_{212}	—	March 28, 2016	Cerro Tololo-DECam	DECam	·	860 m	MPC · JPL
586582	2003 WE_{213}	—	January 1, 2014	Kitt Peak	Spacewatch	·	1.7 km	MPC · JPL
586583	2003 WH_{213}	—	November 26, 2003	Kitt Peak	Spacewatch	·	760 m	MPC · JPL
586584	2003 WZ_{214}	—	November 30, 2003	Kitt Peak	Spacewatch	·	1.0 km	MPC · JPL
586585	2003 XC_{34}	—	December 1, 2003	Kitt Peak	Spacewatch	·	2.2 km	MPC · JPL
586586	2003 XN_{44}	—	September 14, 2010	Mount Lemmon	Mount Lemmon Survey	·	900 m	MPC · JPL
586587	2003 XY_{44}	—	November 21, 2017	Mount Lemmon	Mount Lemmon Survey	·	2.1 km	MPC · JPL
586588	2003 XN_{45}	—	October 9, 2008	Mount Lemmon	Mount Lemmon Survey	·	2.3 km	MPC · JPL
586589	2003 YL_{38}	—	December 19, 2003	Kitt Peak	Spacewatch	DOR	2.3 km	MPC · JPL
586590	2003 YM_{60}	—	December 19, 2003	Kitt Peak	Spacewatch	·	2.3 km	MPC · JPL
586591	2003 YK_{173}	—	December 19, 2003	Kitt Peak	Spacewatch	AGN	1.1 km	MPC · JPL
586592	2003 YG_{183}	—	January 15, 2004	Kitt Peak	Spacewatch	·	2.1 km	MPC · JPL
586593	2003 YL_{183}	—	February 7, 2008	Kitt Peak	Spacewatch	·	1.0 km	MPC · JPL
586594	2003 YM_{183}	—	November 14, 2012	Kitt Peak	Spacewatch	AGN	1.0 km	MPC · JPL
586595	2003 YS_{183}	—	September 14, 2007	Kitt Peak	Spacewatch	HOF	2.3 km	MPC · JPL
586596	2003 YN_{184}	—	November 3, 2007	Mount Lemmon	Mount Lemmon Survey	·	1.7 km	MPC · JPL
586597	2003 YV_{186}	—	December 19, 2007	Mount Lemmon	Mount Lemmon Survey	V	600 m	MPC · JPL
586598	2003 YJ_{189}	—	February 18, 2014	Mount Lemmon	Mount Lemmon Survey	·	1.6 km	MPC · JPL
586599	2003 YT_{190}	—	March 24, 2009	Mount Lemmon	Mount Lemmon Survey	·	1.1 km	MPC · JPL
586600	2004 AC_{13}	—	January 13, 2004	Kitt Peak	Spacewatch	·	990 m	MPC · JPL

== 586601–586700 ==
back to top

Designation			Discovery			Properties		Ref
Permanent	Provisional	Named after	Date	Site	Discoverer(s)	Category	Diam.	Ref
586601	2004 BK_{126}	—	January 16, 2004	Kitt Peak	Spacewatch	MAS	560 m	MPC · JPL
586602	2004 BX_{130}	—	January 16, 2004	Kitt Peak	Spacewatch	·	1.6 km	MPC · JPL
586603	2004 BN_{131}	—	January 16, 2004	Kitt Peak	Spacewatch	·	590 m	MPC · JPL
586604	2004 BE_{165}	—	August 30, 2016	Haleakala	Pan-STARRS 1	BRA	1.3 km	MPC · JPL
586605	2004 BX_{167}	—	September 2, 2011	Haleakala	Pan-STARRS 1	·	1.7 km	MPC · JPL
586606	2004 BO_{169}	—	October 30, 2007	Kitt Peak	Spacewatch	·	1.9 km	MPC · JPL
586607	2004 BN_{170}	—	April 29, 2014	Haleakala	Pan-STARRS 1	·	1.6 km	MPC · JPL
586608	2004 CS_{11}	—	February 11, 2004	Palomar	NEAT	·	1.1 km	MPC · JPL
586609	2004 CG_{131}	—	October 12, 2010	Mount Lemmon	Mount Lemmon Survey	·	1.0 km	MPC · JPL
586610	2004 CR_{133}	—	March 2, 2008	Kitt Peak	Spacewatch	MAS	610 m	MPC · JPL
586611	2004 CZ_{133}	—	October 31, 2010	Kitt Peak	Spacewatch	·	940 m	MPC · JPL
586612	2004 CG_{134}	—	November 28, 2013	Mount Lemmon	Mount Lemmon Survey	·	1.3 km	MPC · JPL
586613	2004 DM_{1}	—	February 16, 2004	Kitt Peak	Spacewatch	H	440 m	MPC · JPL
586614	2004 DR_{39}	—	February 23, 2004	Socorro	LINEAR	H	450 m	MPC · JPL
586615	2004 DK_{82}	—	August 26, 2005	Palomar	NEAT	·	640 m	MPC · JPL
586616	2004 DP_{85}	—	March 31, 2008	Mount Lemmon	Mount Lemmon Survey	·	810 m	MPC · JPL
586617	2004 DM_{87}	—	November 3, 2007	Mount Lemmon	Mount Lemmon Survey	615	960 m	MPC · JPL
586618	2004 DL_{89}	—	February 16, 2004	Kitt Peak	Spacewatch	·	1.9 km	MPC · JPL
586619	2004 EO_{21}	—	March 15, 2004	Valmeca	C. Demeautis, Matter, D.	·	1.6 km	MPC · JPL
586620	2004 EX_{22}	—	March 11, 2004	Palomar	NEAT	H	510 m	MPC · JPL
586621	2004 EG_{98}	—	March 15, 2004	Kitt Peak	Spacewatch	·	1.3 km	MPC · JPL
586622	2004 EF_{107}	—	March 15, 2004	Kitt Peak	Spacewatch	·	1.4 km	MPC · JPL
586623	2004 ED_{109}	—	March 15, 2004	Kitt Peak	Spacewatch	EOS	1.2 km	MPC · JPL
586624	2004 EK_{114}	—	March 9, 2004	Palomar	NEAT	·	2.1 km	MPC · JPL
586625	2004 FZ_{73}	—	March 17, 2004	Kitt Peak	Spacewatch	·	1.4 km	MPC · JPL
586626	2004 FY_{86}	—	March 11, 2004	Palomar	NEAT	H	520 m	MPC · JPL
586627	2004 FZ_{99}	—	March 23, 2004	Kitt Peak	Spacewatch	KOR	1.3 km	MPC · JPL
586628	2004 FO_{152}	—	March 17, 2004	Kitt Peak	Spacewatch	NYS	810 m	MPC · JPL
586629	2004 FM_{154}	—	March 17, 2004	Kitt Peak	Spacewatch	·	710 m	MPC · JPL
586630	2004 FD_{168}	—	August 29, 2016	Mount Lemmon	Mount Lemmon Survey	·	1.9 km	MPC · JPL
586631	2004 FC_{169}	—	November 27, 2013	Haleakala	Pan-STARRS 1	·	1.1 km	MPC · JPL
586632	2004 FP_{173}	—	September 21, 2011	Haleakala	Pan-STARRS 1	·	1.5 km	MPC · JPL
586633	2004 FR_{175}	—	February 9, 2014	Kitt Peak	Spacewatch	·	1.8 km	MPC · JPL
586634	2004 FC_{176}	—	February 27, 2014	Haleakala	Pan-STARRS 1	·	2.0 km	MPC · JPL
586635	2004 FS_{177}	—	March 16, 2004	Kitt Peak	Spacewatch	·	1.8 km	MPC · JPL
586636	2004 GU_{25}	—	April 14, 2004	Kitt Peak	Spacewatch	·	1.7 km	MPC · JPL
586637	2004 GZ_{65}	—	April 13, 2004	Kitt Peak	Spacewatch	·	600 m	MPC · JPL
586638	2004 GD_{68}	—	April 13, 2004	Kitt Peak	Spacewatch	·	610 m	MPC · JPL
586639	2004 GQ_{84}	—	April 14, 2004	Kitt Peak	Spacewatch	·	840 m	MPC · JPL
586640	2004 GU_{85}	—	April 14, 2004	Kitt Peak	Spacewatch	·	500 m	MPC · JPL
586641	2004 GO_{90}	—	February 23, 2007	Kitt Peak	Spacewatch	·	540 m	MPC · JPL
586642	2004 HR_{15}	—	April 16, 2004	Kitt Peak	Spacewatch	L4	7.8 km	MPC · JPL
586643	2004 HB_{40}	—	April 19, 2004	Kitt Peak	Spacewatch	·	590 m	MPC · JPL
586644	2004 HW_{72}	—	April 28, 2004	Kitt Peak	Spacewatch	L4	8.8 km	MPC · JPL
586645	2004 HY_{72}	—	April 28, 2004	Kitt Peak	Spacewatch	AGN	1.2 km	MPC · JPL
586646	2004 HE_{77}	—	April 26, 2004	Mauna Kea	P. A. Wiegert, D. D. Balam	·	1.2 km	MPC · JPL
586647	2004 HX_{79}	—	January 18, 2008	Mount Lemmon	Mount Lemmon Survey	·	1.9 km	MPC · JPL
586648	2004 HY_{79}	—	February 21, 2007	Mount Lemmon	Mount Lemmon Survey	·	660 m	MPC · JPL
586649	2004 HA_{81}	—	October 30, 2011	Mount Lemmon	Mount Lemmon Survey	KOR	1.1 km	MPC · JPL
586650	2004 HD_{82}	—	April 25, 2004	Kitt Peak	Spacewatch	·	700 m	MPC · JPL
586651	2004 HL_{82}	—	November 19, 2015	Mount Lemmon	Mount Lemmon Survey	·	540 m	MPC · JPL
586652	2004 HA_{83}	—	November 15, 2006	Mount Lemmon	Mount Lemmon Survey	V	650 m	MPC · JPL
586653	2004 HO_{84}	—	January 26, 2014	Haleakala	Pan-STARRS 1	·	1.3 km	MPC · JPL
586654	2004 HX_{84}	—	September 11, 2008	Bergisch Gladbach	W. Bickel	L4	7.3 km	MPC · JPL
586655	2004 HM_{85}	—	September 29, 2011	Mount Lemmon	Mount Lemmon Survey	·	1.5 km	MPC · JPL
586656	2004 JJ_{49}	—	May 13, 2004	Kitt Peak	Spacewatch	·	940 m	MPC · JPL
586657	2004 JB_{57}	—	December 2, 2010	Mount Lemmon	Mount Lemmon Survey	L4	7.5 km	MPC · JPL
586658	2004 JP_{57}	—	December 18, 2009	Kitt Peak	Spacewatch	·	510 m	MPC · JPL
586659	2004 KR_{20}	—	April 24, 2012	Mount Lemmon	Mount Lemmon Survey	H	480 m	MPC · JPL
586660	2004 KH_{21}	—	February 26, 2014	Haleakala	Pan-STARRS 1	·	2.0 km	MPC · JPL
586661	2004 KE_{22}	—	April 27, 2008	Kitt Peak	Spacewatch	·	940 m	MPC · JPL
586662	2004 LK_{26}	—	June 12, 2004	Kitt Peak	Spacewatch	L4	9.7 km	MPC · JPL
586663	2004 LF_{32}	—	June 14, 2004	Kitt Peak	Spacewatch	·	810 m	MPC · JPL
586664	2004 LQ_{32}	—	January 4, 2013	Kitt Peak	Spacewatch	L4	9.9 km	MPC · JPL
586665	2004 MB_{10}	—	August 7, 2015	Haleakala	Pan-STARRS 1	·	2.3 km	MPC · JPL
586666	2004 MJ_{10}	—	April 21, 2012	Mount Lemmon	Mount Lemmon Survey	(194)	930 m	MPC · JPL
586667	2004 NZ_{33}	—	July 15, 2004	Siding Spring	SSS	TIR	3.5 km	MPC · JPL
586668	2004 OM_{6}	—	July 16, 2004	Socorro	LINEAR	·	1.0 km	MPC · JPL
586669	2004 OZ_{12}	—	July 17, 2004	Cerro Tololo	Deep Ecliptic Survey	·	1.3 km	MPC · JPL
586670	2004 OP_{16}	—	December 25, 2005	Mount Lemmon	Mount Lemmon Survey	·	700 m	MPC · JPL
586671	2004 OA_{17}	—	October 3, 2013	Kitt Peak	Spacewatch	·	1.0 km	MPC · JPL
586672	2004 PD_{64}	—	August 10, 2004	Socorro	LINEAR	·	1.1 km	MPC · JPL
586673	2004 PS_{70}	—	August 8, 2004	Palomar	NEAT	·	1.5 km	MPC · JPL
586674	2004 PM_{117}	—	August 13, 2004	Palomar	NEAT	·	2.4 km	MPC · JPL
586675	2004 PH_{118}	—	August 7, 2004	Palomar	NEAT	·	1.3 km	MPC · JPL
586676	2004 PK_{118}	—	August 18, 2015	Kitt Peak	Spacewatch	·	2.7 km	MPC · JPL
586677	2004 PC_{119}	—	October 30, 2010	Mount Lemmon	Mount Lemmon Survey	·	2.9 km	MPC · JPL
586678	2004 PY_{119}	—	October 5, 2005	Kitt Peak	Spacewatch	THM	1.7 km	MPC · JPL
586679	2004 QQ_{8}	—	July 16, 2004	Siding Spring	SSS	EUN	1.3 km	MPC · JPL
586680	2004 QT_{29}	—	January 24, 2007	Mount Lemmon	Mount Lemmon Survey	VER	2.6 km	MPC · JPL
586681	2004 QB_{30}	—	October 31, 1999	Kitt Peak	Spacewatch	THM	2.2 km	MPC · JPL
586682	2004 QC_{30}	—	December 12, 2013	Haleakala	Pan-STARRS 1	·	1.2 km	MPC · JPL
586683	2004 QG_{30}	—	October 5, 2011	Piszkéstető	K. Sárneczky	·	660 m	MPC · JPL
586684	2004 QL_{30}	—	July 17, 2004	Cerro Tololo	Deep Ecliptic Survey	·	2.4 km	MPC · JPL
586685	2004 QB_{31}	—	August 22, 2004	Kitt Peak	Spacewatch	·	2.8 km	MPC · JPL
586686	2004 QN_{31}	—	September 27, 2011	Mount Lemmon	Mount Lemmon Survey	·	590 m	MPC · JPL
586687	2004 QW_{31}	—	August 22, 2004	Kitt Peak	Spacewatch	·	2.1 km	MPC · JPL
586688	2004 QC_{32}	—	August 22, 2004	Kitt Peak	Spacewatch	BRG	1.0 km	MPC · JPL
586689	2004 QM_{33}	—	March 5, 2013	Haleakala	Pan-STARRS 1	VER	2.4 km	MPC · JPL
586690	2004 RW_{3}	—	August 8, 2004	Palomar	NEAT	·	1.1 km	MPC · JPL
586691	2004 RS_{6}	—	August 21, 2004	Siding Spring	SSS	EOS	2.3 km	MPC · JPL
586692	2004 RN_{10}	—	July 14, 2004	Siding Spring	SSS	BAR	1.1 km	MPC · JPL
586693	2004 RU_{24}	—	March 13, 2002	Kitt Peak	Spacewatch	·	2.1 km	MPC · JPL
586694	2004 RN_{40}	—	September 7, 2004	Kitt Peak	Spacewatch	·	1.1 km	MPC · JPL
586695	2004 RN_{92}	—	September 8, 2004	Socorro	LINEAR	·	1.4 km	MPC · JPL
586696	2004 RT_{115}	—	September 7, 2004	Kitt Peak	Spacewatch	·	1.1 km	MPC · JPL
586697	2004 RQ_{120}	—	September 7, 2004	Kitt Peak	Spacewatch	·	1.0 km	MPC · JPL
586698	2004 RT_{123}	—	September 7, 2004	Palomar	NEAT	·	1.3 km	MPC · JPL
586699	2004 RN_{126}	—	September 7, 2004	Kitt Peak	Spacewatch	·	2.5 km	MPC · JPL
586700	2004 RM_{128}	—	September 7, 2004	Kitt Peak	Spacewatch	·	780 m	MPC · JPL

== 586701–586800 ==
back to top

Designation			Discovery			Properties		Ref
Permanent	Provisional	Named after	Date	Site	Discoverer(s)	Category	Diam.	Ref
586701	2004 RA_{134}	—	September 7, 2004	Kitt Peak	Spacewatch	THM	1.9 km	MPC · JPL
586702	2004 RF_{134}	—	August 15, 2004	Cerro Tololo	Deep Ecliptic Survey	·	1.1 km	MPC · JPL
586703	2004 RB_{139}	—	September 8, 2004	Palomar	NEAT	·	2.9 km	MPC · JPL
586704	2004 RH_{143}	—	August 10, 2004	Palomar	NEAT	TIR	3.6 km	MPC · JPL
586705	2004 RC_{148}	—	September 8, 2004	Socorro	LINEAR	·	1.3 km	MPC · JPL
586706	2004 RL_{156}	—	September 10, 2004	Socorro	LINEAR	·	2.4 km	MPC · JPL
586707	2004 RX_{168}	—	September 8, 2004	Apache Point	SDSS Collaboration	·	1.8 km	MPC · JPL
586708	2004 RE_{172}	—	January 23, 2006	Kitt Peak	Spacewatch	·	1.6 km	MPC · JPL
586709	2004 RH_{173}	—	September 9, 2004	Kitt Peak	Spacewatch	·	2.1 km	MPC · JPL
586710	2004 RU_{173}	—	August 13, 2004	Palomar	NEAT	·	1.2 km	MPC · JPL
586711	2004 RA_{175}	—	July 10, 2004	Palomar	NEAT	·	2.3 km	MPC · JPL
586712	2004 RQ_{199}	—	September 10, 2004	Kitt Peak	Spacewatch	·	1.4 km	MPC · JPL
586713	2004 RA_{205}	—	September 7, 2004	Palomar	NEAT	·	3.0 km	MPC · JPL
586714	2004 RC_{210}	—	September 11, 2004	Socorro	LINEAR	·	3.0 km	MPC · JPL
586715	2004 RQ_{239}	—	September 10, 2004	Kitt Peak	Spacewatch	·	3.1 km	MPC · JPL
586716	2004 RJ_{240}	—	May 6, 2003	Kitt Peak	Spacewatch	·	1.0 km	MPC · JPL
586717	2004 RG_{241}	—	September 10, 2004	Kitt Peak	Spacewatch	·	1.8 km	MPC · JPL
586718	2004 RA_{247}	—	September 11, 2004	Socorro	LINEAR	·	1.1 km	MPC · JPL
586719	2004 RG_{247}	—	September 11, 2004	Kitt Peak	Spacewatch	·	1.2 km	MPC · JPL
586720	2004 RJ_{260}	—	September 10, 2004	Kitt Peak	Spacewatch	·	970 m	MPC · JPL
586721	2004 RV_{262}	—	September 10, 2004	Kitt Peak	Spacewatch	·	2.2 km	MPC · JPL
586722	2004 RG_{263}	—	September 10, 2004	Kitt Peak	Spacewatch	(7744)	1.1 km	MPC · JPL
586723	2004 RV_{273}	—	September 11, 2004	Kitt Peak	Spacewatch	·	1.2 km	MPC · JPL
586724	2004 RT_{282}	—	September 15, 2004	Kitt Peak	Spacewatch	·	1.2 km	MPC · JPL
586725	2004 RF_{287}	—	September 11, 2004	Kitt Peak	Spacewatch	·	2.2 km	MPC · JPL
586726	2004 RO_{290}	—	September 8, 2004	Socorro	LINEAR	(5)	1.2 km	MPC · JPL
586727	2004 RK_{294}	—	September 11, 2004	Kitt Peak	Spacewatch	·	2.3 km	MPC · JPL
586728	2004 RW_{298}	—	September 11, 2004	Kitt Peak	Spacewatch	·	2.5 km	MPC · JPL
586729	2004 RH_{302}	—	September 11, 2004	Kitt Peak	Spacewatch	·	1.1 km	MPC · JPL
586730	2004 RP_{308}	—	September 13, 2004	Socorro	LINEAR	ADE	1.4 km	MPC · JPL
586731	2004 RK_{331}	—	September 15, 2004	Kitt Peak	Spacewatch	EUN	1.2 km	MPC · JPL
586732	2004 RZ_{336}	—	September 15, 2004	Kitt Peak	Spacewatch	·	3.5 km	MPC · JPL
586733	2004 RJ_{338}	—	September 15, 2004	Kitt Peak	Spacewatch	·	1.1 km	MPC · JPL
586734	2004 RK_{351}	—	September 11, 2004	Kitt Peak	Spacewatch	·	3.1 km	MPC · JPL
586735	2004 RT_{357}	—	December 29, 2011	Mount Lemmon	Mount Lemmon Survey	·	2.9 km	MPC · JPL
586736	2004 RF_{358}	—	October 17, 2010	Mount Lemmon	Mount Lemmon Survey	EOS	1.8 km	MPC · JPL
586737	2004 RG_{358}	—	February 3, 2012	Haleakala	Pan-STARRS 1	·	2.5 km	MPC · JPL
586738	2004 RL_{358}	—	September 18, 2010	Mount Lemmon	Mount Lemmon Survey	THM	2.0 km	MPC · JPL
586739	2004 RM_{358}	—	March 5, 2013	Haleakala	Pan-STARRS 1	·	2.4 km	MPC · JPL
586740	2004 RG_{359}	—	September 23, 2008	Mount Lemmon	Mount Lemmon Survey	(116763)	2.0 km	MPC · JPL
586741	2004 RT_{359}	—	October 25, 2005	Mount Lemmon	Mount Lemmon Survey	·	3.2 km	MPC · JPL
586742	2004 RU_{360}	—	May 4, 2014	Haleakala	Pan-STARRS 1	·	2.5 km	MPC · JPL
586743	2004 RD_{362}	—	September 11, 2004	Kitt Peak	Spacewatch	EOS	1.6 km	MPC · JPL
586744	2004 RX_{363}	—	August 13, 2004	Cerro Tololo	Deep Ecliptic Survey	·	2.5 km	MPC · JPL
586745	2004 RE_{366}	—	September 9, 2004	Kitt Peak	Spacewatch	·	1.5 km	MPC · JPL
586746	2004 SJ_{28}	—	July 17, 2004	Cerro Tololo	Deep Ecliptic Survey	NYS	1.1 km	MPC · JPL
586747	2004 SG_{37}	—	September 17, 2004	Kitt Peak	Spacewatch	EOS	1.7 km	MPC · JPL
586748	2004 SH_{46}	—	September 10, 2004	Kitt Peak	Spacewatch	·	3.0 km	MPC · JPL
586749	2004 SW_{59}	—	September 18, 2004	Socorro	LINEAR	·	860 m	MPC · JPL
586750	2004 SM_{61}	—	September 18, 2004	Socorro	LINEAR	·	1.4 km	MPC · JPL
586751	2004 SX_{61}	—	September 22, 2004	Kitt Peak	Spacewatch	TIR	2.2 km	MPC · JPL
586752	2004 SA_{63}	—	August 21, 2015	Haleakala	Pan-STARRS 1	·	2.4 km	MPC · JPL
586753	2004 SD_{63}	—	December 31, 2013	Kitt Peak	Spacewatch	RAF	840 m	MPC · JPL
586754	2004 SQ_{64}	—	February 1, 2006	Kitt Peak	Spacewatch	H	400 m	MPC · JPL
586755	2004 SF_{65}	—	September 24, 2004	Kitt Peak	Spacewatch	·	2.2 km	MPC · JPL
586756	2004 SJ_{65}	—	September 16, 2009	Mount Lemmon	Mount Lemmon Survey	·	1.5 km	MPC · JPL
586757	2004 SN_{65}	—	February 10, 2008	Kitt Peak	Spacewatch	·	2.1 km	MPC · JPL
586758	2004 TR	—	September 18, 2004	Socorro	LINEAR	·	1.1 km	MPC · JPL
586759	2004 TT_{4}	—	October 4, 2004	Kitt Peak	Spacewatch	·	2.9 km	MPC · JPL
586760	2004 TM_{14}	—	October 10, 2004	Socorro	LINEAR	·	1.6 km	MPC · JPL
586761	2004 TQ_{18}	—	September 8, 2004	Socorro	LINEAR	·	1.5 km	MPC · JPL
586762	2004 TG_{23}	—	October 4, 2004	Kitt Peak	Spacewatch	·	2.6 km	MPC · JPL
586763	2004 TP_{66}	—	October 5, 2004	Anderson Mesa	LONEOS	ADE	2.1 km	MPC · JPL
586764	2004 TW_{78}	—	October 4, 2004	Kitt Peak	Spacewatch	·	1.1 km	MPC · JPL
586765	2004 TX_{92}	—	October 5, 2004	Kitt Peak	Spacewatch	·	1.2 km	MPC · JPL
586766	2004 TT_{141}	—	October 4, 2004	Kitt Peak	Spacewatch	·	2.8 km	MPC · JPL
586767	2004 TC_{147}	—	October 6, 2004	Kitt Peak	Spacewatch	·	2.1 km	MPC · JPL
586768	2004 TP_{152}	—	October 6, 2004	Kitt Peak	Spacewatch	·	3.0 km	MPC · JPL
586769	2004 TH_{155}	—	September 23, 2004	Kitt Peak	Spacewatch	·	1.1 km	MPC · JPL
586770	2004 TE_{162}	—	October 6, 2004	Kitt Peak	Spacewatch	·	1.0 km	MPC · JPL
586771	2004 TD_{165}	—	October 7, 2004	Kitt Peak	Spacewatch	·	2.7 km	MPC · JPL
586772	2004 TQ_{193}	—	October 7, 2004	Kitt Peak	Spacewatch	(5)	1.2 km	MPC · JPL
586773	2004 TA_{201}	—	October 7, 2004	Kitt Peak	Spacewatch	MIS	1.8 km	MPC · JPL
586774	2004 TG_{218}	—	October 5, 2004	Kitt Peak	Spacewatch	·	1.2 km	MPC · JPL
586775	2004 TH_{220}	—	October 5, 2004	Powell	Trentman, R.	·	1.3 km	MPC · JPL
586776	2004 TV_{224}	—	October 8, 2004	Kitt Peak	Spacewatch	·	1.5 km	MPC · JPL
586777	2004 TM_{227}	—	October 8, 2004	Kitt Peak	Spacewatch	·	3.2 km	MPC · JPL
586778	2004 TL_{232}	—	October 8, 2004	Kitt Peak	Spacewatch	·	2.1 km	MPC · JPL
586779	2004 TK_{234}	—	October 8, 2004	Kitt Peak	Spacewatch	·	2.9 km	MPC · JPL
586780	2004 TX_{236}	—	October 9, 2004	Kitt Peak	Spacewatch	·	1.2 km	MPC · JPL
586781	2004 TO_{250}	—	October 8, 2004	Palomar	NEAT	THB	3.1 km	MPC · JPL
586782	2004 TW_{253}	—	October 9, 2004	Kitt Peak	Spacewatch	·	1.1 km	MPC · JPL
586783	2004 TG_{261}	—	October 9, 2004	Kitt Peak	Spacewatch	·	1.2 km	MPC · JPL
586784	2004 TR_{273}	—	October 9, 2004	Kitt Peak	Spacewatch	·	2.9 km	MPC · JPL
586785	2004 TQ_{279}	—	September 17, 2004	Kitt Peak	Spacewatch	·	1.2 km	MPC · JPL
586786	2004 TO_{284}	—	September 22, 2004	Kitt Peak	Spacewatch	·	2.7 km	MPC · JPL
586787	2004 TM_{288}	—	October 10, 2004	Kitt Peak	Spacewatch	·	1.4 km	MPC · JPL
586788	2004 TZ_{303}	—	October 10, 2004	Kitt Peak	Spacewatch	·	2.6 km	MPC · JPL
586789	2004 TY_{304}	—	October 10, 2004	Kitt Peak	Spacewatch	·	2.5 km	MPC · JPL
586790	2004 TQ_{305}	—	October 10, 2004	Kitt Peak	Spacewatch	·	2.5 km	MPC · JPL
586791	2004 TB_{317}	—	October 11, 2004	Kitt Peak	Spacewatch	THM	2.0 km	MPC · JPL
586792	2004 TU_{319}	—	October 11, 2004	Kitt Peak	Spacewatch	·	2.7 km	MPC · JPL
586793	2004 TJ_{329}	—	October 8, 2004	Kitt Peak	Spacewatch	·	1.4 km	MPC · JPL
586794	2004 TK_{329}	—	October 8, 2004	Kitt Peak	Spacewatch	·	2.8 km	MPC · JPL
586795	2004 TQ_{335}	—	October 10, 2004	Kitt Peak	Spacewatch	·	510 m	MPC · JPL
586796	2004 TZ_{349}	—	August 23, 2004	Kitt Peak	Spacewatch	·	940 m	MPC · JPL
586797	2004 TK_{352}	—	October 11, 2004	Kitt Peak	Deep Ecliptic Survey	·	2.3 km	MPC · JPL
586798	2004 TO_{372}	—	October 18, 2009	Mount Lemmon	Mount Lemmon Survey	EUN	1.3 km	MPC · JPL
586799	2004 TR_{373}	—	July 30, 2008	Kitt Peak	Spacewatch	·	1.1 km	MPC · JPL
586800	2004 TS_{374}	—	May 3, 2006	Mount Lemmon	Mount Lemmon Survey	·	760 m	MPC · JPL

== 586801–586900 ==
back to top

Designation			Discovery			Properties		Ref
Permanent	Provisional	Named after	Date	Site	Discoverer(s)	Category	Diam.	Ref
586801	2004 TM_{375}	—	May 7, 2014	Haleakala	Pan-STARRS 1	·	2.2 km	MPC · JPL
586802	2004 TQ_{375}	—	July 8, 2008	Mount Lemmon	Mount Lemmon Survey	·	1.3 km	MPC · JPL
586803	2004 TP_{376}	—	February 9, 2013	Haleakala	Pan-STARRS 1	·	660 m	MPC · JPL
586804	2004 TY_{376}	—	September 6, 2008	Mount Lemmon	Mount Lemmon Survey	·	960 m	MPC · JPL
586805	2004 TK_{380}	—	February 16, 2015	Haleakala	Pan-STARRS 1	·	1.3 km	MPC · JPL
586806	2004 TH_{382}	—	October 6, 2004	Kitt Peak	Spacewatch	·	620 m	MPC · JPL
586807	2004 TX_{382}	—	March 13, 2013	Haleakala	Pan-STARRS 1	VER	2.2 km	MPC · JPL
586808	2004 TH_{384}	—	October 24, 2009	Kitt Peak	Spacewatch	·	1.2 km	MPC · JPL
586809	2004 TY_{384}	—	October 10, 2004	Kitt Peak	Deep Ecliptic Survey	NEM	2.1 km	MPC · JPL
586810	2004 TE_{385}	—	October 15, 2004	Mount Lemmon	Mount Lemmon Survey	·	3.3 km	MPC · JPL
586811	2004 UE_{6}	—	October 20, 2004	Socorro	LINEAR	·	1.8 km	MPC · JPL
586812	2004 VP_{23}	—	November 5, 2004	Palomar	NEAT	·	2.3 km	MPC · JPL
586813	2004 VZ_{29}	—	October 23, 2004	Kitt Peak	Spacewatch	·	1.2 km	MPC · JPL
586814	2004 VD_{33}	—	November 3, 2004	Kitt Peak	Spacewatch	·	560 m	MPC · JPL
586815	2004 VU_{36}	—	November 4, 2004	Kitt Peak	Spacewatch	·	710 m	MPC · JPL
586816	2004 VA_{47}	—	November 4, 2004	Kitt Peak	Spacewatch	·	1.4 km	MPC · JPL
586817	2004 VS_{47}	—	November 4, 2004	Kitt Peak	Spacewatch	(194)	1.4 km	MPC · JPL
586818	2004 VU_{49}	—	November 4, 2004	Kitt Peak	Spacewatch	·	1.6 km	MPC · JPL
586819	2004 VX_{54}	—	February 7, 2006	Kitt Peak	Spacewatch	·	2.5 km	MPC · JPL
586820	2004 VD_{64}	—	November 7, 2004	Needville	Needville	·	1.8 km	MPC · JPL
586821	2004 VT_{94}	—	November 10, 2004	Kitt Peak	Spacewatch	·	3.6 km	MPC · JPL
586822	2004 VS_{103}	—	November 9, 2004	Mauna Kea	Veillet, C.	·	1.3 km	MPC · JPL
586823	2004 VF_{105}	—	November 9, 2004	Mauna Kea	Veillet, C.	·	1.1 km	MPC · JPL
586824	2004 VR_{105}	—	November 9, 2004	Mauna Kea	Veillet, C.	·	640 m	MPC · JPL
586825	2004 VC_{107}	—	November 3, 2004	Kitt Peak	Spacewatch	·	3.6 km	MPC · JPL
586826	2004 VN_{111}	—	November 4, 2004	Catalina	CSS	VER	3.9 km	MPC · JPL
586827	2004 VL_{129}	—	October 15, 2004	Kitt Peak	Deep Ecliptic Survey	·	590 m	MPC · JPL
586828	2004 VH_{132}	—	November 6, 2010	Mount Lemmon	Mount Lemmon Survey	·	3.8 km	MPC · JPL
586829	2004 VO_{133}	—	May 22, 2003	Kitt Peak	Spacewatch	T_{j} (2.99) · EUP	3.0 km	MPC · JPL
586830	2004 VC_{135}	—	October 6, 2008	Kitt Peak	Spacewatch	(5)	1.0 km	MPC · JPL
586831	2004 VM_{135}	—	September 24, 2017	Haleakala	Pan-STARRS 1	·	1.4 km	MPC · JPL
586832	2004 VH_{136}	—	September 23, 2008	Mount Lemmon	Mount Lemmon Survey	·	1.9 km	MPC · JPL
586833	2004 VP_{136}	—	January 23, 2018	Mount Lemmon	Mount Lemmon Survey	·	2.3 km	MPC · JPL
586834	2004 VB_{138}	—	November 4, 2004	Kitt Peak	Spacewatch	THM	2.0 km	MPC · JPL
586835	2004 WQ_{13}	—	September 30, 2008	Mount Lemmon	Mount Lemmon Survey	·	1.7 km	MPC · JPL
586836	2004 XP_{7}	—	December 2, 2004	Palomar	NEAT	·	2.0 km	MPC · JPL
586837	2004 XY_{32}	—	December 2, 2004	Palomar	NEAT	·	1.7 km	MPC · JPL
586838	2004 XU_{33}	—	February 7, 2002	Palomar	NEAT	·	1.0 km	MPC · JPL
586839	2004 XB_{53}	—	December 10, 2004	Kitt Peak	Spacewatch	·	1.3 km	MPC · JPL
586840	2004 XJ_{74}	—	December 8, 2004	Socorro	LINEAR	EUN	1.2 km	MPC · JPL
586841	2004 XW_{102}	—	December 14, 2004	Catalina	CSS	·	1.6 km	MPC · JPL
586842	2004 XA_{117}	—	December 12, 2004	Kitt Peak	Spacewatch	·	1.5 km	MPC · JPL
586843	2004 XA_{148}	—	December 14, 2004	Catalina	CSS	·	1.5 km	MPC · JPL
586844	2004 XO_{150}	—	December 15, 2004	Kitt Peak	Spacewatch	·	1.5 km	MPC · JPL
586845	2004 XA_{193}	—	December 2, 2004	Catalina	CSS	·	3.0 km	MPC · JPL
586846	2004 XH_{193}	—	February 16, 2010	Mount Lemmon	Mount Lemmon Survey	·	1.2 km	MPC · JPL
586847	2004 XP_{193}	—	December 31, 2011	Kitt Peak	Spacewatch	·	800 m	MPC · JPL
586848	2004 XZ_{193}	—	October 8, 2008	Mount Lemmon	Mount Lemmon Survey	·	1.2 km	MPC · JPL
586849	2004 XU_{194}	—	December 22, 2008	Kitt Peak	Spacewatch	NYS	1.1 km	MPC · JPL
586850	2004 YZ_{37}	—	March 25, 2015	Mount Lemmon	Mount Lemmon Survey	·	1.7 km	MPC · JPL
586851	2004 YH_{38}	—	October 12, 2007	Mount Lemmon	Mount Lemmon Survey	ERI	1.3 km	MPC · JPL
586852	2004 YN_{39}	—	September 28, 2009	Mount Lemmon	Mount Lemmon Survey	·	3.4 km	MPC · JPL
586853	2004 YS_{40}	—	December 19, 2004	Mount Lemmon	Mount Lemmon Survey	·	550 m	MPC · JPL
586854	2005 AN_{24}	—	January 7, 2005	Catalina	CSS	PHO	1.4 km	MPC · JPL
586855	2005 AP_{38}	—	January 13, 2005	Catalina	CSS	·	1.6 km	MPC · JPL
586856	2005 AF_{49}	—	January 13, 2005	Socorro	LINEAR	ERI	1.4 km	MPC · JPL
586857	2005 AF_{70}	—	January 15, 2005	Kitt Peak	Spacewatch	·	1.5 km	MPC · JPL
586858	2005 AD_{83}	—	January 15, 2005	Kitt Peak	Spacewatch	·	1.3 km	MPC · JPL
586859	2005 AV_{83}	—	January 13, 2005	Kitt Peak	Spacewatch	·	1 km	MPC · JPL
586860	2005 AD_{85}	—	January 7, 2005	Campo Imperatore	CINEOS	MRX	860 m	MPC · JPL
586861	2005 BX_{29}	—	January 19, 2005	Kitt Peak	Spacewatch	·	1.5 km	MPC · JPL
586862	2005 BL_{31}	—	January 16, 2005	Mauna Kea	Veillet, C.	·	1.1 km	MPC · JPL
586863	2005 BD_{35}	—	January 15, 2005	Kitt Peak	Spacewatch	·	2.1 km	MPC · JPL
586864	2005 BV_{35}	—	January 16, 2005	Mauna Kea	Veillet, C.	AGN	920 m	MPC · JPL
586865	2005 BJ_{40}	—	January 16, 2005	Mauna Kea	Veillet, C.	·	700 m	MPC · JPL
586866	2005 BN_{41}	—	January 16, 2005	Kitt Peak	Spacewatch	·	3.1 km	MPC · JPL
586867	2005 BA_{46}	—	January 16, 2005	Mauna Kea	Veillet, C.	·	1.4 km	MPC · JPL
586868	2005 BP_{50}	—	October 1, 2008	Mount Lemmon	Mount Lemmon Survey	·	1.4 km	MPC · JPL
586869	2005 BS_{50}	—	December 24, 2011	Mount Lemmon	Mount Lemmon Survey	·	840 m	MPC · JPL
586870	2005 BU_{50}	—	August 26, 2012	Haleakala	Pan-STARRS 1	·	1.4 km	MPC · JPL
586871	2005 BU_{53}	—	December 18, 2004	Mount Lemmon	Mount Lemmon Survey	GEF	890 m	MPC · JPL
586872	2005 BE_{54}	—	March 28, 2015	Kitt Peak	Spacewatch	·	1.8 km	MPC · JPL
586873	2005 BS_{54}	—	March 28, 2015	Haleakala	Pan-STARRS 1	·	2.2 km	MPC · JPL
586874	2005 BA_{56}	—	January 19, 2005	Kitt Peak	Spacewatch	·	2.7 km	MPC · JPL
586875	2005 CH_{10}	—	February 1, 2005	Kitt Peak	Spacewatch	·	800 m	MPC · JPL
586876	2005 CB_{11}	—	February 1, 2005	Kitt Peak	Spacewatch	NYS	1.3 km	MPC · JPL
586877	2005 CO_{31}	—	February 1, 2005	Kitt Peak	Spacewatch	·	870 m	MPC · JPL
586878	2005 CC_{39}	—	February 9, 2005	La Silla	A. Boattini	·	1.0 km	MPC · JPL
586879	2005 CK_{51}	—	February 2, 2005	Catalina	CSS	·	2.2 km	MPC · JPL
586880	2005 CP_{72}	—	February 1, 2005	Kitt Peak	Spacewatch	·	2.4 km	MPC · JPL
586881	2005 CK_{82}	—	December 31, 2008	Mount Lemmon	Mount Lemmon Survey	LEO	1.6 km	MPC · JPL
586882	2005 CN_{82}	—	February 9, 2005	Kitt Peak	Spacewatch	·	1.4 km	MPC · JPL
586883	2005 CK_{84}	—	June 5, 2013	Mount Lemmon	Mount Lemmon Survey	·	840 m	MPC · JPL
586884	2005 CD_{85}	—	January 13, 2016	Haleakala	Pan-STARRS 1	·	1.0 km	MPC · JPL
586885	2005 CP_{85}	—	March 18, 2010	Mount Lemmon	Mount Lemmon Survey	·	1.4 km	MPC · JPL
586886	2005 CX_{85}	—	December 1, 2008	Mount Lemmon	Mount Lemmon Survey	·	1.9 km	MPC · JPL
586887	2005 CX_{88}	—	February 1, 2005	Kitt Peak	Spacewatch	·	1.0 km	MPC · JPL
586888	2005 DY_{3}	—	September 13, 2007	Mount Lemmon	Mount Lemmon Survey	·	1.4 km	MPC · JPL
586889	2005 DK_{4}	—	January 16, 2013	Mount Lemmon	Mount Lemmon Survey	L4 · ERY	6.7 km	MPC · JPL
586890	2005 EF_{40}	—	March 1, 2005	Kitt Peak	Spacewatch	·	950 m	MPC · JPL
586891	2005 ER_{55}	—	March 4, 2005	Kitt Peak	Spacewatch	NYS	1.1 km	MPC · JPL
586892	2005 EE_{57}	—	March 4, 2005	Mount Lemmon	Mount Lemmon Survey	THM	1.9 km	MPC · JPL
586893	2005 ET_{111}	—	March 4, 2005	Mount Lemmon	Mount Lemmon Survey	·	890 m	MPC · JPL
586894	2005 EF_{134}	—	March 9, 2005	Mount Lemmon	Mount Lemmon Survey	·	1.4 km	MPC · JPL
586895	2005 EK_{149}	—	March 10, 2005	Kitt Peak	Spacewatch	·	2.0 km	MPC · JPL
586896	2005 EE_{170}	—	March 11, 2005	Kitt Peak	Spacewatch	·	1.2 km	MPC · JPL
586897	2005 EO_{170}	—	February 2, 2005	Palomar	NEAT	PHO	1.2 km	MPC · JPL
586898	2005 EG_{176}	—	March 8, 2005	Mount Lemmon	Mount Lemmon Survey	·	1.2 km	MPC · JPL
586899	2005 EL_{180}	—	March 9, 2005	Kitt Peak	Spacewatch	GEF	1.1 km	MPC · JPL
586900	2005 EA_{193}	—	March 11, 2005	Mount Lemmon	Mount Lemmon Survey	·	1.0 km	MPC · JPL

== 586901–587000 ==
back to top

Designation			Discovery			Properties		Ref
Permanent	Provisional	Named after	Date	Site	Discoverer(s)	Category	Diam.	Ref
586901	2005 EB_{196}	—	March 11, 2005	Mount Lemmon	Mount Lemmon Survey	·	1.4 km	MPC · JPL
586902	2005 EA_{213}	—	March 4, 2005	Mount Lemmon	Mount Lemmon Survey	·	2.0 km	MPC · JPL
586903	2005 EH_{227}	—	March 9, 2005	Mount Lemmon	Mount Lemmon Survey	NYS	850 m	MPC · JPL
586904	2005 EV_{228}	—	February 28, 2009	Kitt Peak	Spacewatch	MAS	640 m	MPC · JPL
586905	2005 EN_{230}	—	February 9, 2005	Kitt Peak	Spacewatch	NYS	900 m	MPC · JPL
586906	2005 EU_{238}	—	March 11, 2005	Kitt Peak	Spacewatch	·	1.8 km	MPC · JPL
586907	2005 EW_{239}	—	March 11, 2005	Kitt Peak	Spacewatch	·	1.0 km	MPC · JPL
586908	2005 ET_{246}	—	March 12, 2005	Kitt Peak	Spacewatch	·	2.2 km	MPC · JPL
586909	2005 EK_{259}	—	March 11, 2005	Mount Lemmon	Mount Lemmon Survey	NYS	1.3 km	MPC · JPL
586910	2005 EZ_{307}	—	March 8, 2005	Mount Lemmon	Mount Lemmon Survey	AGN	950 m	MPC · JPL
586911	2005 EU_{312}	—	March 11, 2005	Mount Lemmon	Mount Lemmon Survey	HOF	1.9 km	MPC · JPL
586912	2005 ES_{317}	—	March 17, 2005	Kitt Peak	Spacewatch	MAS	700 m	MPC · JPL
586913	2005 EL_{323}	—	March 12, 2005	Kitt Peak	Deep Ecliptic Survey	·	1.2 km	MPC · JPL
586914	2005 EE_{330}	—	January 19, 2005	Kitt Peak	Spacewatch	·	980 m	MPC · JPL
586915	2005 ER_{334}	—	March 11, 2005	Mount Lemmon	Mount Lemmon Survey	NYS	800 m	MPC · JPL
586916	2005 EL_{336}	—	March 8, 2005	Mount Lemmon	Mount Lemmon Survey	·	860 m	MPC · JPL
586917	2005 EP_{336}	—	May 30, 2009	Mount Lemmon	Mount Lemmon Survey	MAS	660 m	MPC · JPL
586918	2005 EG_{337}	—	March 3, 2005	Catalina	CSS	·	1.1 km	MPC · JPL
586919	2005 EF_{340}	—	September 15, 1998	Kitt Peak	Spacewatch	·	1.0 km	MPC · JPL
586920	2005 EY_{340}	—	October 15, 2012	Haleakala	Pan-STARRS 1	DOR	1.8 km	MPC · JPL
586921	2005 EL_{341}	—	August 27, 2006	Kitt Peak	Spacewatch	·	970 m	MPC · JPL
586922	2005 EV_{341}	—	January 23, 2015	Haleakala	Pan-STARRS 1	KOR	1.1 km	MPC · JPL
586923	2005 EG_{342}	—	December 19, 2007	Kitt Peak	Spacewatch	·	890 m	MPC · JPL
586924	2005 ET_{344}	—	March 3, 2005	Kitt Peak	Spacewatch	·	1.1 km	MPC · JPL
586925	2005 EG_{347}	—	November 6, 2012	Mount Lemmon	Mount Lemmon Survey	AGN	1.0 km	MPC · JPL
586926	2005 EB_{348}	—	March 4, 2005	Mount Lemmon	Mount Lemmon Survey	·	800 m	MPC · JPL
586927	2005 EK_{349}	—	March 11, 2005	Kitt Peak	Spacewatch	·	650 m	MPC · JPL
586928	2005 FB_{17}	—	March 17, 2005	Kitt Peak	Spacewatch	·	1.1 km	MPC · JPL
586929	2005 FM_{17}	—	May 1, 2009	Mount Lemmon	Mount Lemmon Survey	·	990 m	MPC · JPL
586930	2005 FN_{20}	—	March 17, 2005	Kitt Peak	Spacewatch	·	1.9 km	MPC · JPL
586931	2005 GQ_{26}	—	April 2, 2005	Mount Lemmon	Mount Lemmon Survey	·	1.1 km	MPC · JPL
586932	2005 GN_{47}	—	April 5, 2005	Mount Lemmon	Mount Lemmon Survey	·	820 m	MPC · JPL
586933	2005 GU_{55}	—	March 17, 2005	Kitt Peak	Spacewatch	·	960 m	MPC · JPL
586934	2005 GJ_{59}	—	April 5, 2005	Palomar	NEAT	H	470 m	MPC · JPL
586935	2005 GD_{70}	—	March 17, 2005	Kitt Peak	Spacewatch	V	590 m	MPC · JPL
586936	2005 GJ_{75}	—	April 5, 2005	Mount Lemmon	Mount Lemmon Survey	NYS	810 m	MPC · JPL
586937	2005 GO_{100}	—	April 9, 2005	Mount Lemmon	Mount Lemmon Survey	H	350 m	MPC · JPL
586938	2005 GB_{117}	—	April 11, 2005	Kitt Peak	Spacewatch	H	450 m	MPC · JPL
586939	2005 GB_{138}	—	April 11, 2005	Mount Lemmon	Mount Lemmon Survey	·	1.0 km	MPC · JPL
586940	2005 GF_{174}	—	April 14, 2005	Kitt Peak	Spacewatch	·	900 m	MPC · JPL
586941	2005 GX_{175}	—	April 14, 2005	Kitt Peak	Spacewatch	·	1.1 km	MPC · JPL
586942	2005 GB_{184}	—	February 9, 2005	Kitt Peak	Spacewatch	HOF	2.3 km	MPC · JPL
586943	2005 GD_{185}	—	March 16, 2005	Mount Lemmon	Mount Lemmon Survey	·	820 m	MPC · JPL
586944	2005 GQ_{191}	—	March 13, 2005	Kitt Peak	Spacewatch	·	910 m	MPC · JPL
586945	2005 GC_{196}	—	April 10, 2005	Kitt Peak	Deep Ecliptic Survey	·	630 m	MPC · JPL
586946	2005 GW_{217}	—	March 4, 2005	Mount Lemmon	Mount Lemmon Survey	MAS	580 m	MPC · JPL
586947	2005 GZ_{219}	—	April 4, 2005	Mount Lemmon	Mount Lemmon Survey	·	1.7 km	MPC · JPL
586948	2005 GG_{230}	—	April 10, 2005	Mount Lemmon	Mount Lemmon Survey	·	1.1 km	MPC · JPL
586949	2005 GN_{232}	—	November 8, 2016	Haleakala	Pan-STARRS 1	·	3.2 km	MPC · JPL
586950	2005 GO_{232}	—	April 27, 2009	Mount Lemmon	Mount Lemmon Survey	·	1.0 km	MPC · JPL
586951	2005 GA_{234}	—	February 26, 2014	Haleakala	Pan-STARRS 1	·	2.0 km	MPC · JPL
586952	2005 GR_{236}	—	November 14, 2007	Kitt Peak	Spacewatch	NYS	870 m	MPC · JPL
586953	2005 GL_{240}	—	April 6, 2005	Mount Lemmon	Mount Lemmon Survey	MAS	680 m	MPC · JPL
586954	2005 HT	—	April 16, 2005	Kitt Peak	Spacewatch	·	550 m	MPC · JPL
586955	2005 JA_{18}	—	April 7, 2005	Kitt Peak	Spacewatch	MAS	640 m	MPC · JPL
586956	2005 JG_{32}	—	May 4, 2005	Mount Lemmon	Mount Lemmon Survey	NYS	830 m	MPC · JPL
586957	2005 JB_{71}	—	May 7, 2005	Mount Lemmon	Mount Lemmon Survey	MAS	610 m	MPC · JPL
586958	2005 JX_{113}	—	May 10, 2005	Kitt Peak	Spacewatch	·	1.7 km	MPC · JPL
586959	2005 JA_{171}	—	May 10, 2005	Cerro Tololo	Deep Ecliptic Survey	·	1.5 km	MPC · JPL
586960	2005 JO_{172}	—	May 10, 2005	Cerro Tololo	Deep Ecliptic Survey	L4	5.4 km	MPC · JPL
586961	2005 JK_{183}	—	May 10, 2005	Kitt Peak	Spacewatch	·	2.0 km	MPC · JPL
586962	2005 JZ_{187}	—	April 2, 1994	Kitt Peak	Spacewatch	·	1.0 km	MPC · JPL
586963	2005 JE_{188}	—	April 4, 2005	Mount Lemmon	Mount Lemmon Survey	BRA	1.3 km	MPC · JPL
586964	2005 JN_{188}	—	April 18, 2009	Mount Lemmon	Mount Lemmon Survey	·	960 m	MPC · JPL
586965	2005 JM_{191}	—	May 11, 2005	Kitt Peak	Spacewatch	·	1.7 km	MPC · JPL
586966	2005 JR_{192}	—	April 27, 2009	Mount Lemmon	Mount Lemmon Survey	·	1.1 km	MPC · JPL
586967	2005 KN_{10}	—	May 29, 2005	Siding Spring	SSS	·	1.3 km	MPC · JPL
586968	2005 KY_{14}	—	May 20, 2005	Mount Lemmon	Mount Lemmon Survey	·	840 m	MPC · JPL
586969	2005 LN	—	June 1, 2005	Mount Lemmon	Mount Lemmon Survey	·	2.1 km	MPC · JPL
586970	2005 LB_{11}	—	June 3, 2005	Kitt Peak	Spacewatch	·	1.6 km	MPC · JPL
586971	2005 LB_{14}	—	June 4, 2005	Kitt Peak	Spacewatch	·	2.6 km	MPC · JPL
586972	2005 MW_{49}	—	June 30, 2005	Kitt Peak	Spacewatch	NYS	1.0 km	MPC · JPL
586973	2005 MM_{55}	—	June 30, 2005	Kitt Peak	Spacewatch	·	2.0 km	MPC · JPL
586974	2005 ML_{56}	—	October 20, 2011	Mount Lemmon	Mount Lemmon Survey	·	2.0 km	MPC · JPL
586975	2005 NM_{14}	—	July 5, 2005	Mount Lemmon	Mount Lemmon Survey	·	1.6 km	MPC · JPL
586976	2005 NL_{31}	—	July 4, 2005	Mount Lemmon	Mount Lemmon Survey	·	1.4 km	MPC · JPL
586977	2005 NH_{62}	—	June 30, 2005	Kitt Peak	Spacewatch	V	820 m	MPC · JPL
586978	2005 NC_{72}	—	July 5, 2005	Mount Lemmon	Mount Lemmon Survey	·	2.1 km	MPC · JPL
586979	2005 NT_{90}	—	July 5, 2005	Kitt Peak	Spacewatch	PHO	960 m	MPC · JPL
586980	2005 NC_{112}	—	July 7, 2005	Mauna Kea	Veillet, C.	·	900 m	MPC · JPL
586981	2005 NN_{113}	—	July 7, 2005	Mauna Kea	Veillet, C.	·	1.5 km	MPC · JPL
586982	2005 NP_{117}	—	July 15, 2005	Mount Lemmon	Mount Lemmon Survey	·	1.4 km	MPC · JPL
586983	2005 NH_{120}	—	June 17, 2005	Mount Lemmon	Mount Lemmon Survey	·	1.9 km	MPC · JPL
586984	2005 NJ_{120}	—	July 7, 2005	Mauna Kea	Veillet, C.	·	1.4 km	MPC · JPL
586985	2005 NX_{120}	—	July 15, 2005	Mount Lemmon	Mount Lemmon Survey	·	1.9 km	MPC · JPL
586986	2005 NW_{126}	—	July 5, 2005	Palomar	NEAT	·	690 m	MPC · JPL
586987	2005 NZ_{128}	—	January 16, 2008	Kitt Peak	Spacewatch	·	1.8 km	MPC · JPL
586988	2005 NT_{133}	—	July 5, 2005	Kitt Peak	Spacewatch	·	480 m	MPC · JPL
586989	2005 OT_{11}	—	July 29, 2005	Palomar	NEAT	·	2.1 km	MPC · JPL
586990	2005 OO_{15}	—	June 29, 2005	Kitt Peak	Spacewatch	H	520 m	MPC · JPL
586991	2005 OR_{24}	—	July 30, 2005	Campo Imperatore	CINEOS	·	2.7 km	MPC · JPL
586992	2005 ON_{32}	—	December 23, 2012	Haleakala	Pan-STARRS 1	EOS	1.7 km	MPC · JPL
586993	2005 OK_{35}	—	July 31, 2005	Palomar	NEAT	·	500 m	MPC · JPL
586994	2005 PX_{10}	—	August 4, 2005	Palomar	NEAT	·	810 m	MPC · JPL
586995	2005 PM_{29}	—	January 17, 2007	Kitt Peak	Spacewatch	·	1.0 km	MPC · JPL
586996	2005 PB_{31}	—	May 21, 2014	Haleakala	Pan-STARRS 1	·	490 m	MPC · JPL
586997	2005 PG_{31}	—	August 8, 2005	Cerro Tololo	Deep Ecliptic Survey	·	2.2 km	MPC · JPL
586998	2005 QO_{14}	—	August 25, 2005	Palomar	NEAT	·	1.5 km	MPC · JPL
586999	2005 QO_{19}	—	July 30, 2005	Palomar	NEAT	KOR	1.5 km	MPC · JPL
587000	2005 QT_{24}	—	August 27, 2005	Kitt Peak	Spacewatch	H	520 m	MPC · JPL

back to top

== Meaning of names ==
As minor planet discoveries are confirmed, they are given a permanent number by the IAU's Minor Planet Center (MPC), and the discoverers can then submit names for them, following the IAU's naming conventions. The list below concerns those minor planets in the specified number-range that have received names, and explains the meanings of those names.

Official naming citations of newly named small Solar System bodies are approved and published in a bulletin by IAU's Working Group for Small Bodies Nomenclature (WGSBN). Before May 2021, citations were published in MPC's Minor Planet Circulars for many decades. Recent citations can also be found on the JPL Small-Body Database (SBDB). Until his death in 2016, German astronomer Lutz D. Schmadel compiled these citations into the Dictionary of Minor Planet Names (DMP) and regularly updated the collection.

Based on Paul Herget's The Names of the Minor Planets, Schmadel also researched the unclear origin of numerous asteroids, most of which had been named prior to World War II. This article incorporates text from this source, which is in the public domain: SBDB New namings may only be added to this list below after official publication as the preannouncement of names is condemned. The WGSBN publishes a comprehensive guideline for the naming rules of non-cometary small Solar System bodies.

Named minor planet	Provisional	This minor planet was named for...	Ref · Catalog
586003 Monspartsarolta	2000 RY_{108}	Sarolta Monspart (1944–2021), a Hungarian orienteering world champion.	IAU · 586003
