= Bohuslav Beránek =

Czech orienteer

Medal record

Men's orienteering

Representing Czechoslovakia

World Championships
Bronze medal – third place	1970 Eisenach	Relay

Bohuslav Beránek (25 March 1946 – 5 October 2007) was a Czech orienteering competitor who competed for Czechoslovakia. At the 1970 World Orienteering Championships in Eisenach he won a bronze medal in the relay, together with Zdeněk Lenhart, Jaroslav Jašek and Svatoslav Galík. He lived in Plzeň.
