= Jaroslav Jašek =

Czechoslovak orienteer

Medal record

Men's orienteering

Representing Czechoslovakia

World Championships
Bronze medal – third place	1970 Eisenach	Relay

Jaroslav Jašek (29 March 1946 – 5 September 2010) was an orienteering competitor who competed for Czechoslovakia. At the 1970 World Orienteering Championships in Eisenach, he won a bronze medal in the relay, together with Zdeněk Lenhart, Bohuslav Beránek and Svatoslav Galík.
