= Svatoslav Galík =

Czech orienteer (1938–2019)

Personal information
- Nationality: Czech
- Born: 31 January 1938 Zlín, Czechoslovakia
- Died: 27 November 2019 (aged 81) Velké Karlovice, Czech Republic

Sport
- Sport: Orienteering
Medal record
Men's orienteering
Representing Czechoslovakia
World Championships
Bronze medal – third place	1970 Eisenach	Relay

Svatoslav Galík (31 January 1938 – 27 November 2019) was a Czech hotelier and orienteer who competed for Czechoslovakia. At the 1970 World Orienteering Championships in Eisenach, he won a bronze medal in the relay, together with Zdeněk Lenhart, Bohuslav Beránek and Jaroslav Jašek.

Galík was born on 31 January 1938 in Zlín. After finishing his career and moving to Velké Karlovice, he took up cross-country skiing and cycling. In Velké Karlovice-Lesková he was first the manager of the Svit recreation centre, after 1990 he owned and operated it under the name of Hotel Galík. He died in Velké Karlovice on 27 November 2019.
