= Kristin Danielsen (orienteer) =

Norwegian orienteer

Medal record

Women's orienteering

Representing Norway

World Championships
Silver medal – second place	1974 Silkeborg	Relay
Bronze medal – third place	1970 Eisenach	Individual
Bronze medal – third place	1970 Eisenach	Relay

Kristin Danielsen is a Norwegian orienteering competitor. She won a silver medal in the relay at the 1974 World Orienteering Championships, and two bronze medals in the 1970 World Orienteering Championships.
