= Zdeněk Lenhart =

Medal record

Men's orienteering

Representing Czechoslovakia

World Championships
| Bronze medal – third place | 1970 Eisenach | Relay |
| Bronze medal – third place | 1979 Tampere | Relay |

Zdeněk Lenhart (born 29 September 1948 in Brno) is a Czech former orienteering competitor who competed for Czechoslovakia. At the 1970 World Orienteering Championships in Eisenach, he won a bronze medal in the relay, together with Bohuslav Beránek, Jaroslav Jašek and Svatoslav Galík. At the 1979 World Orienteering Championships in Tampere he again won a bronze medal in the relay, together with Petr Uher, Jiří Ticháček and Jaroslav Kačmarčík.
