= Dieter Hulliger =

Swiss orienteering competitor

Medal record

Men's orienteering

Representing Switzerland

World Championships
Silver medal – second place	1972 Jičín	Relay
Bronze medal – third place	1970 Eisenach	Individual

Dieter Hulliger (born 1946) is a Swiss orienteering competitor. He received an individual bronze medal at the 1970 World Orienteering Championships, and a silver medal in relay in 1972.
