= Sarolta Monspart =

Hungarian orienteering competitor (1944–2021)

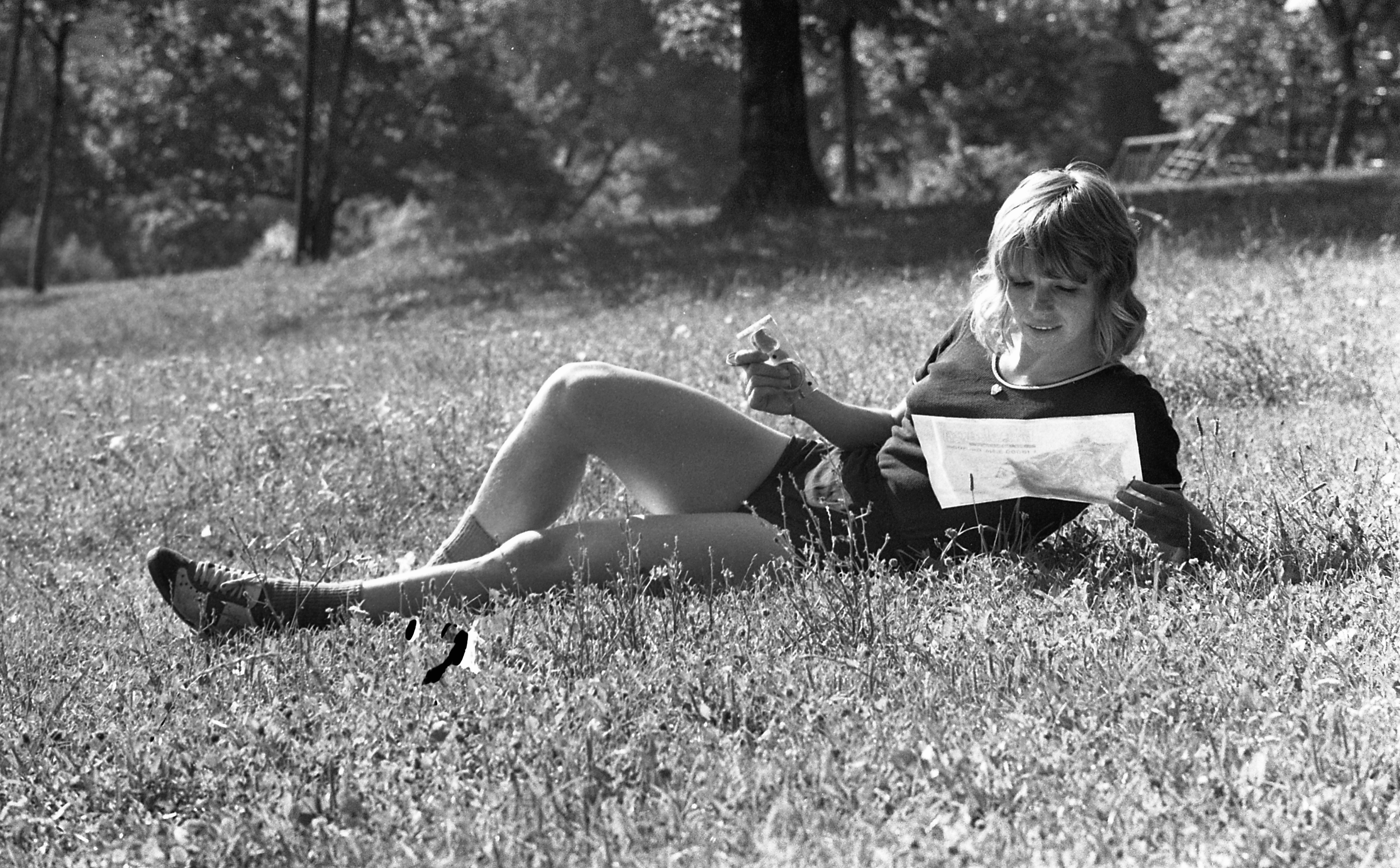
- Monspart in 1978

Medal record

Women's orienteering

Representing Hungary

World Championships
Gold medal – first place	1972 Jičín	Individual
Silver medal – second place	1970 Eisenach	Relay
Bronze medal – third place	1976 Aviemore	Relay

Sarolta Monspart (17 November 1944 – 24 April 2021) was a Hungarian orienteering competitor. In 1972 she became the first non-Scandinavian female runner to win the World Orienteering Championships.

She is considered to be the most successful orienteer in Hungary. During her active years she won 14 national orienteering championships and six cross-country skiing championships. She was the first European woman to finish the marathon distance within 3 hours.

Her sport career was stopped because of a serious encephalitis inflammation caused by a tick. After recovering from the disease, she became an advocate for women to live a healthy life. According to Tünde Szabó, she was responsible for hundreds of thousands of Hungarian women participating in various sports. In 2003 she received a medal for lifetime merit from Ferenc Mádl, president of Hungary.

Monspart died in 2021 after a long, serious illness.
