= Karl John (orienteer) =

Swiss orienteering competitor

Medal record

Men's orienteering

Representing Switzerland

World Championships
Silver medal – second place	1970 Eisenach	Individual
Silver medal – second place	1972 Jičín	Relay

Karl John is a Swiss orienteering competitor. He received an individual silver medal at the 1970 World Orienteering Championships, and a silver medal in relay in 1972.
