= Eoin Keith =

Irish ultramarathon runner

Eoin Keith is an Irish ultramarathon runner who won the Spine Race, a winter run along the Pennine Way, in 2016, 2019 and 2022. His 2022 time for the 268 miles (431 km) race was 92:40:30 (3 days, 20 hr, 40.5 mins). Other achievements include winning a 170 km race in Oman in 2019.
