= Mike Hartley (runner) =

British ultramarathon runner

Personal information
- Full name: Michael Hartley
- Born: 14 July 1952 (age 73) Yorkshire, U.K.

Sport
- Country: Great Britain
- Sport: Ultramarathon
- Event: 100 km

Michael Hartley (born 14 July 1952) is a British ultramarathon runner. He has held the record for a number of British long-distance trails, including the Pennine Way, and has represented Great Britain in the 100km road race.

Initially a climber and hiker, Hartley took up running at age 28, training by running 7 miles (11 km) to and from his job as a meter reader. He was soon successful in long, off-road events, winning the 60-mile (97 km) Fellsman in 1984, 1987, 1989 and 1990. He was first in some of the Long Distance Walkers Association events, including the White Peak Hundred (mile) in 1988. He finished second in the 96-mile (154 km) West Highland Way Race behind Dave Wallace in 1989, a race now considered legendary.

Hartley went on to hold the Fastest Known Times (FKTs) for a number of British long-distance trails. In 1988, he ran the 212-mile (341 km) Southern Upland Way in 55:55, a record which stood until 2020 when in was broken by Jack Scott. In 1989, Hartley set records for the 81-mile (130 km) Dales Way with a time of 13:34 (beaten later that year by Dennis Beresford), and the 92-mile (148 km) Staffordshire Way with a time of 16:10 (a record which stands to this day). In 1991, Hartley broke the record for Wainwright's 185-mile (298 km) Coast to Coast route, running 1:15:36; this remained the fastest time until 2021 when Damian Hall ran 18 minutes quicker.

In 1989, Hartley ran the 268-mile (431 km) Pennine Way from Kirk Yetholm to Edale in a record time of 2 days 17 hours 20 minutes, which he considers his most famous and most satisfying achievement. He did not sleep during the run, and took 4½ hours off the previous best, set by Mike Cudahy. For his run, Hartley received awards for performance of the year from both the Fell Runners Association and the Bob Graham Club. The record stood until 2020 when John Kelly reduced the time by 34 minutes.

In 1990, Hartley ran a traverse of the twenty-four hour mountain challenges: Ramsay's Round, the Bob Graham Round, and the Paddy Buckley Round, to test himself to the limit. He finished in a continuous 3 days 14 hours 20 minutes, including travelling time between the rounds.

Later in his running career, Hartley was more prominent in road and track races. He finished third at the London to Brighton in 1992 and was victorious at the Barry 40 mile track race in 1992 and 1993, running a time of 4:00:20 in 1993. He represented Great Britain three times in the 100 km road race: at the 1993 European Championships and the 1993 and 1995 World Championships. He finished fourth in the European Championships in 6:37:45, which remains in the top ten of the British all-time road ranking list for the distance.

In 2023, Hartley wrote an autobiography entitled From One Extreme to the Other.
