= Lucy Gossage =

British doctor and former triathlete

Personal information
- Born: Lucy Gossage; 25 December 1979 (age 46)

Sport
- Country: United Kingdom
Medal record
Event	1st	2nd	3rd
Ironman Triathlon	5	1	1
Ironman 70.3	0	1	1
European Duathlon Championships	2	0	0
Total	7	2	2
Women's Triathlon
Representing Great Britain
Ironman Triathlon
Gold medal – first place	2013 United Kingdom	Triathlon
Gold medal – first place	2013 Wales	Triathlon
Silver medal – second place	2014 South Africa	Triathlon
Gold medal – first place	2014 Lanzarote	Triathlon
Gold medal – first place	2015 United Kingdom	Triathlon
Gold medal – first place	2016 United Kingdom	Triathlon
Gold medal – first place	2018 Wales	Triathlon
Ironman 70.3
Bronze medal – third place	2013 Majorca	Triathlon
Silver medal – second place	2013 Lanzarote	Triathlon
Women's Duathlon
Representing Great Britain
European Duathlon Championships
Gold medal – first place	2012	Duathlon
Gold medal – first place	2013	Duathlon
Powerman World Series
Silver medal – second place	2012	Duathlon

Lucy Gossage (born 25 December 1979) is a British doctor and former triathlete and duathlete, who currently works at Nottingham University Hospitals NHS Trust. As an athlete, Gossage competed in Ironman Triathlon events, was twice European duathlon champion, and won multiple Ironman Triathlon events.

== Sports career ==
In April 2012, Gossage won the European Women's duathlon title, and she retained the title in 2013, as well as finishing the Powerman Duathlon World Series in second place in 2012. Aged 34, she decided to become a full-time Ironman Triathlon competitor. She won her first Ironman event in 2013 in the United Kingdom, and later in the year won the Wales Ironman event; that year, she won the British Triathlon Federation award for female Long Distance Triathlete of the Year. Her other victories in Ironman Triathlons have been in 2014 in Lanzarote, and in the UK in 2015 and 2016. She qualified for the 2016 Ironman World Championship, and finished ninth, despite breaking her collarbone eight weeks prior to the race. Gossage retired from professional sport to focus on her job; 2020 was scheduled to be her last year.

She has since pursued ultra running, coming third in her debut entry of the 268-mile Montane Winter Spine Race in 2024, and winning the race in 2025. She set the women's record for the Pennine Way in September 2026 with a time of 2 days, 22 hours and 47 minutes.

== Professional career ==
Gossage studied medicine at the University of Cambridge, with her PhD focusing on kidney cancer, and she is a trained cancer doctor. Gossage started working as a specialist registrar in 2009, and as of 2020, she worked as an oncology consultant at Nottingham University Hospitals NHS Trust. From 2014 to 2016, she took two years away from her academic career to focus on her sports career.
