= Coast to Coast Walk =

190-mile footpath across northern England

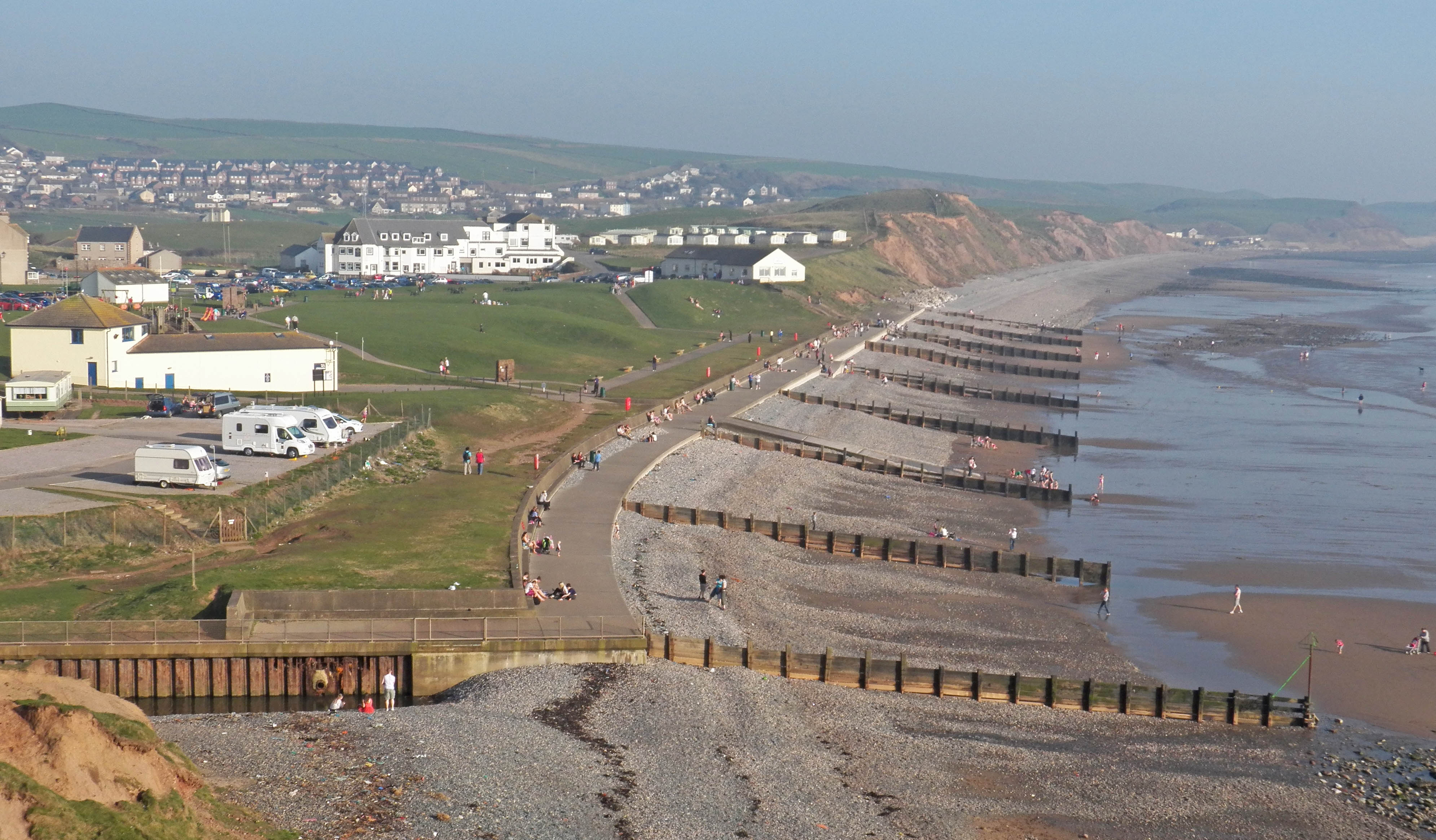
- St Bees beach – start of the walk – from South Head
- Length: 190 mi (306 km)
- Location: Northern England
- Designation: Long distance footpath, designated a National Trail in 2022
- Trailheads: St Bees, Cumbria; 54.492°N 3.612°W; Robin Hood's Bay, North Yorkshire; 54.435°N 0.535°W
- Use: Hiking
- Highest point: Kidsty Pike, 780 m (2,560 ft)
- Lowest point: Sea level

The Coast to Coast Walk is a long-distance footpath running between the west and east coasts of Northern England, nominally 190 miles (306 km) in length. Devised by Alfred Wainwright, it passes through three contrasting national parks: the Lake District, the Yorkshire Dales, and the North York Moors. The currently measured distance is reported as 182 miles (293 km).

Wainwright recommends that walkers dip their booted feet in the Irish Sea at St Bees and, at the end of the walk, in the North Sea at Robin Hood's Bay.

The route has traditionally been an unofficial and largely unsignposted trail. On 12 August 2022 it was announced that the Coast to Coast Walk would become an official National Trail, following a campaign by the Wainwright Society (the designated Responsible Organisation for the trail) and Rishi Sunak, MP for Richmond and Northallerton. Work commenced to upgrade the route, and it was officially opened as a National Trail in March 2026, at a length of 190 miles (306 km). It has been referred to as the Coast to Coast Path National Trail on the National Trails website since February 2026, and has also been called the Wainwright Way.

== History and status ==
The Coast to Coast was originally described by Alfred Wainwright in his 1973 book A Coast to Coast Walk. Wainwright's book has since been revised a number of times in recent years (most recently in 2003) with updates to the recommended route.

Wainwright's book describes the route in 12 stages, each of which ends at a settlement with at least some overnight accommodation nearby. If one stage is walked per day, with one or two rest days, the route makes a two-week holiday, and web logs of coast-to-coasters seem to indicate that this is the most common way of walking the route. However, Wainwright explicitly states that he did not intend people to necessarily stick to these daily stages, or even to his route. For instance, the majority of Wainwright's stages start and end at low level with a single up-down during the day: many walkers split the Borrowdale–Patterdale stage at Grasmere in order to maintain this pattern and avoid having two major uphill sections in one day. Splitting two or three more of the longer stages, and adding a further one or two rest days, reduces the average day-length to 10 or 12 miles and makes the walk a much easier three-week trip with time to "stand and stare", an activity much approved of by Wainwright.

I want to encourage in others the ambition to devise with the aid of maps their own cross-country marathons and not be merely followers of other people's routes: there is no end to the possibilities for originality and initiative.

— A. Wainwright, A Coast to Coast Walk

The Coast to Coast Walk uses public rights of way (public footpaths, tracks, and minor roads), permissive paths and access land; it is one of the most popular of all the long-distance footpaths in the UK. In 2004 the walk was named as the second-best walk in the world according to a survey of experts. Harvey Maps publishes a dedicated strip map at 1:40,000 scale.

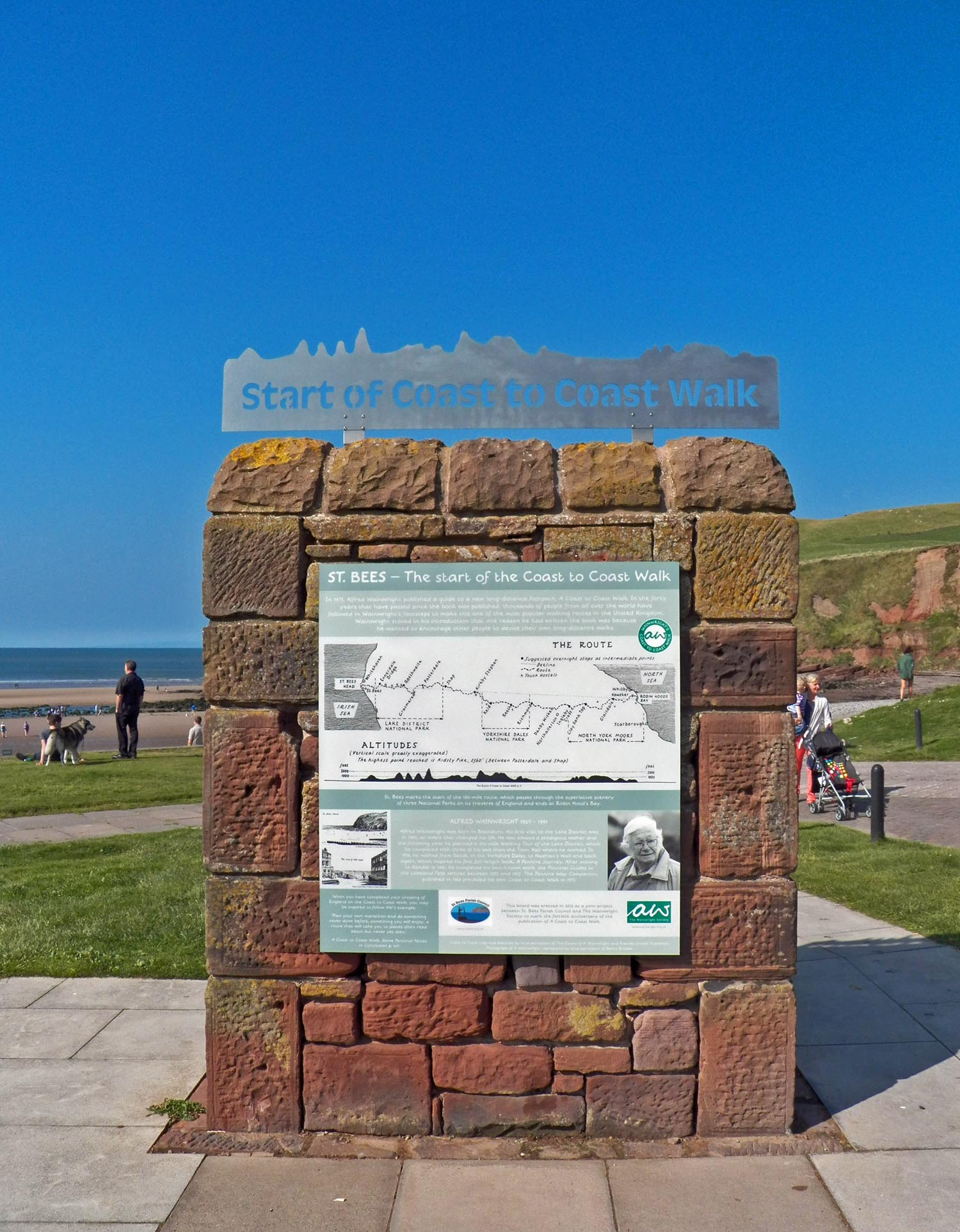
The start of the Coast to Coast Walk at St Bees beach. New sign and banner added 2013 by the Wainwright Society and St Bees Parish Council.

Tradition dictates that walkers should start the route on St Bees beach by getting one's feet wet and collecting a pebble. The walk should end in a similar fashion, by wetting the feet and depositing the pebble on the beach at Robin Hood's Bay.

== Route ==
Route of the Coast to Coast Walk

The description in this article is given from west to east. This is the more popular direction, and the one given in the original and most of the current guides; it is the direction that keeps the prevailing wind and rain at one's back, and the evening sun out of one's eyes. Some walkers do start from the east coast, either because they wish to have the Lake District as the climax of their walk or because they have already walked the route in the conventional direction.

Wainwright's route begins at St Bees in Cumbria, on the Irish Sea. It crosses the West Cumbrian coastal plain and the Lake District, and enters North Yorkshire as it crosses the Pennines. It then crosses the Yorkshire Dales, the Vale of York and the North York Moors to reach the North Sea coast at Robin Hood's Bay.

=== Lake District ===
- From the small seaside town of St Bees, where there is a "C to C" monument by the lifeboat station, the route follows the cliffs of St Bees Head north for a few miles before turning inland to pass through the villages of Sandwith, Moor Row and Cleator in the West Cumberland Plain. It then climbs its first hill (Dent), and follows its first valley (Nannycatch) before reaching Ennerdale Bridge.
- The path goes up the valley of Ennerdale along the edge of Ennerdale Water and past the Black Sail Hut youth hostel. It climbs alongside Loft Beck to the fells north of Great Gable, passes the disused slate workings and mountain tramway of Honister, and descends to Rosthwaite in Borrowdale.
- To leave Borrowdale, the route passes Stonethwaite and follows the stream up to Greenup Edge, before travelling along the Helm Crag ridge and down to Grasmere village.
- From Grasmere the route ascends to the pass of Grisedale Hause from where Wainwright offers a choice of three routes: via either of the mountains of Helvellyn or St Sunday Crag, or an easier descent along the valley of Grisedale, the three options reuniting at Patterdale village.
- From Patterdale, a stiff climb leads to Angle Tarn and Kidsty Pike — at 2,560 feet (780 metres) the highest point on the walk. There is then a steep drop to Haweswater from where the route follows the north shore of the lake before leaving the Lake District and visiting Shap Abbey and the village of Shap itself.

=== Westmorland and Yorkshire Dales ===
- From Shap the route crosses the limestone pavement of the Westmorland limestone plateau to the village of Orton, and on to Kirkby Stephen.
- The route climbs to the main west/east watershed of England (which forms the Yorkshire border) on the ridge of Nine Standards Rigg, from where moorland trails and upland streams lead down into Swaledale. To help mitigate the effects of erosion much of this section of the path is flagstoned. At almost exactly its halfway point, the Coast to Coast crosses the Pennine Way at Keld.
- After Keld, there is a choice of two routes, high (open and breezy, with remnants of the lead mining industry), or low (riverside, with teashops and pubs), both of which lead to Reeth.
- In lower Swaledale, the route passes Marrick Priory, through wooded hillside to the market town of Richmond (the largest town on the Coast to Coast and a popular location for a rest day).

=== Vale of Mowbray and North York Moors ===
- After Richmond, the route runs close to the River Wiske (but is more direct than the river) across the flat farming land of the Vale of Mowbray (the northern extension of the Vale of York) to the village of Danby Wiske, and on to Ingleby Cross.
- The route then climbs up to the western edge of the North York Moors to join the Cleveland Way and Lyke Wake Walk and is coincident with these routes over the major summits of the Cleveland Hills (known as the 'Cleveland Frontline') as it rises and falls to Clay Bank Top. (Wainwright stated that the Lyke Wake Walk would form an acceptable finish to his 'A Coast to Coast Walk', though the former finishes at Ravenscar, 4 miles (6.4 km) south of Bay Town, the end point of Wainwright's route.)
- The route continues with the Cleveland Way & Lyke Wake Walk, crossing Urra Moor to Bloworth Crossing, where the Cleveland Way turns north and the Coast to Coast continues east on the trackbed of the dismantled Rosedale Railway (still coincident with the Lyke Wake Walk) to Blakey Ridge and the Lion Inn.
- Next, the route continues around the head of Rosedale before parting ways with the Lyke Wake Walk at the Millennium Stone to skirt Great Fryup Dale before descending Glaisdale Rigg to the village of Glaisdale. From there, a woodland path leads to Egton Bridge where the route follows an old toll road to Grosmont.
- After a climb out of Grosmont, the route crosses Sleights Moor before dropping into Littlebeck Wood (with a hermitage carved out of a single boulder, and the Falling Foss waterfall). From there the route passes through Low and High Hawsker to the cliff tops of the east coast, where it rejoins the Cleveland Way. The path then follows the coast southwards to the village of Robin Hood's Bay.

== Places of interest ==
The following major headland is traversed by the route:

- St Bees Head

The following hills are crossed by the route:

- Dent
- High Stile (variant)
- Helm Crag (optional)
- Helvellyn and St Sunday Crag (variants)
- Kidsty Pike
- Nine Standards Rigg/Hartley Fell
- Carlton Bank
- Cringle Moor/High Blakey Moor/Glaisdale Moor
- Urra Moor

== Crossings ==
In May 2021, the route was run in 39 hours 18 minutes and 40 seconds by Damian Hall, setting a new record. The previous record was set in 1991, 39 hours 36 minutes and 52 seconds by Mike Hartley. The record before that was set in 1985 by Mike Cudahy, who completed it in 46 hours 49 minutes.

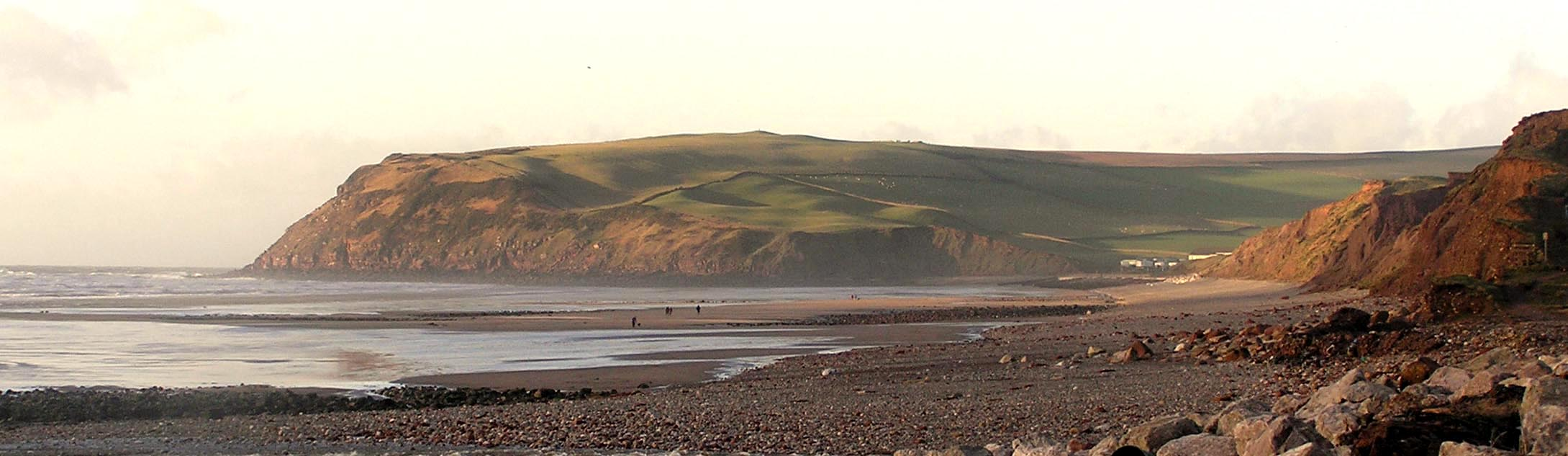
St Bees South Head & beach

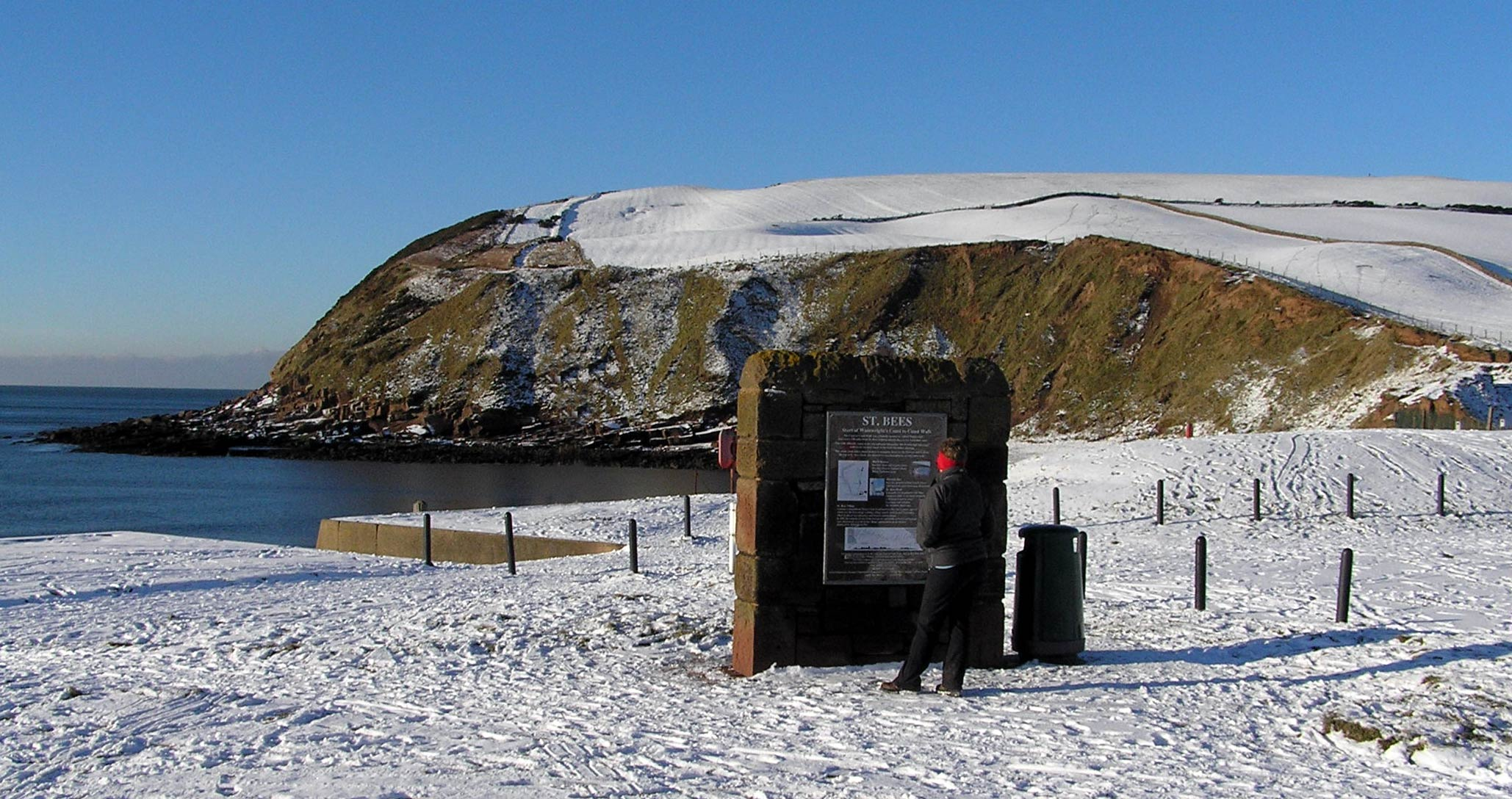
St Bees: Start of the C to C in winter (The "Wainwright wall" in foreground)

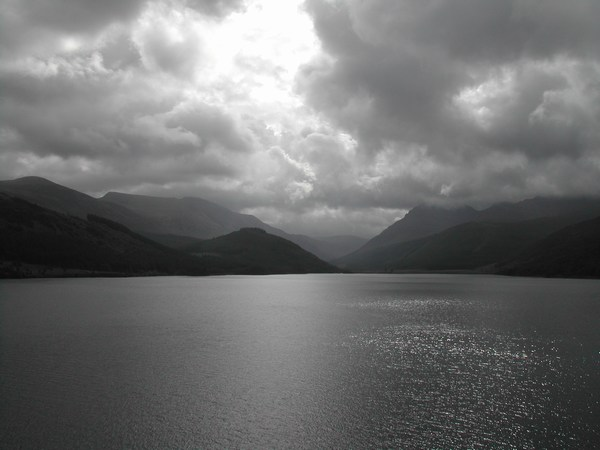
Ennerdale Water from Anglers Crag

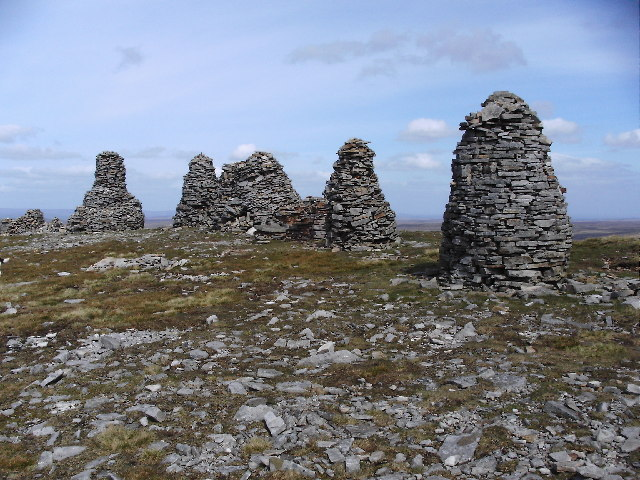
Nine Standards

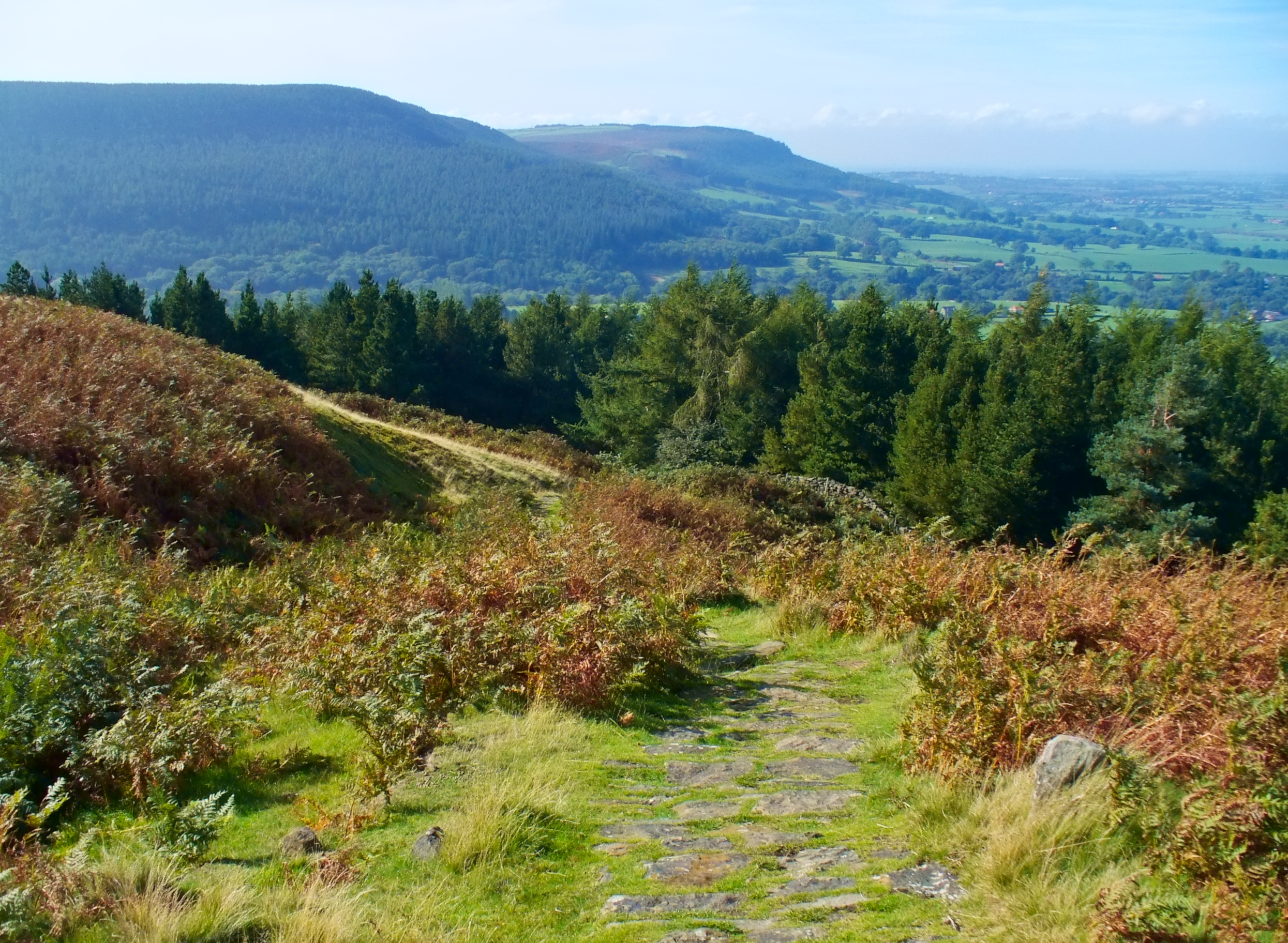
The Cleveland Way

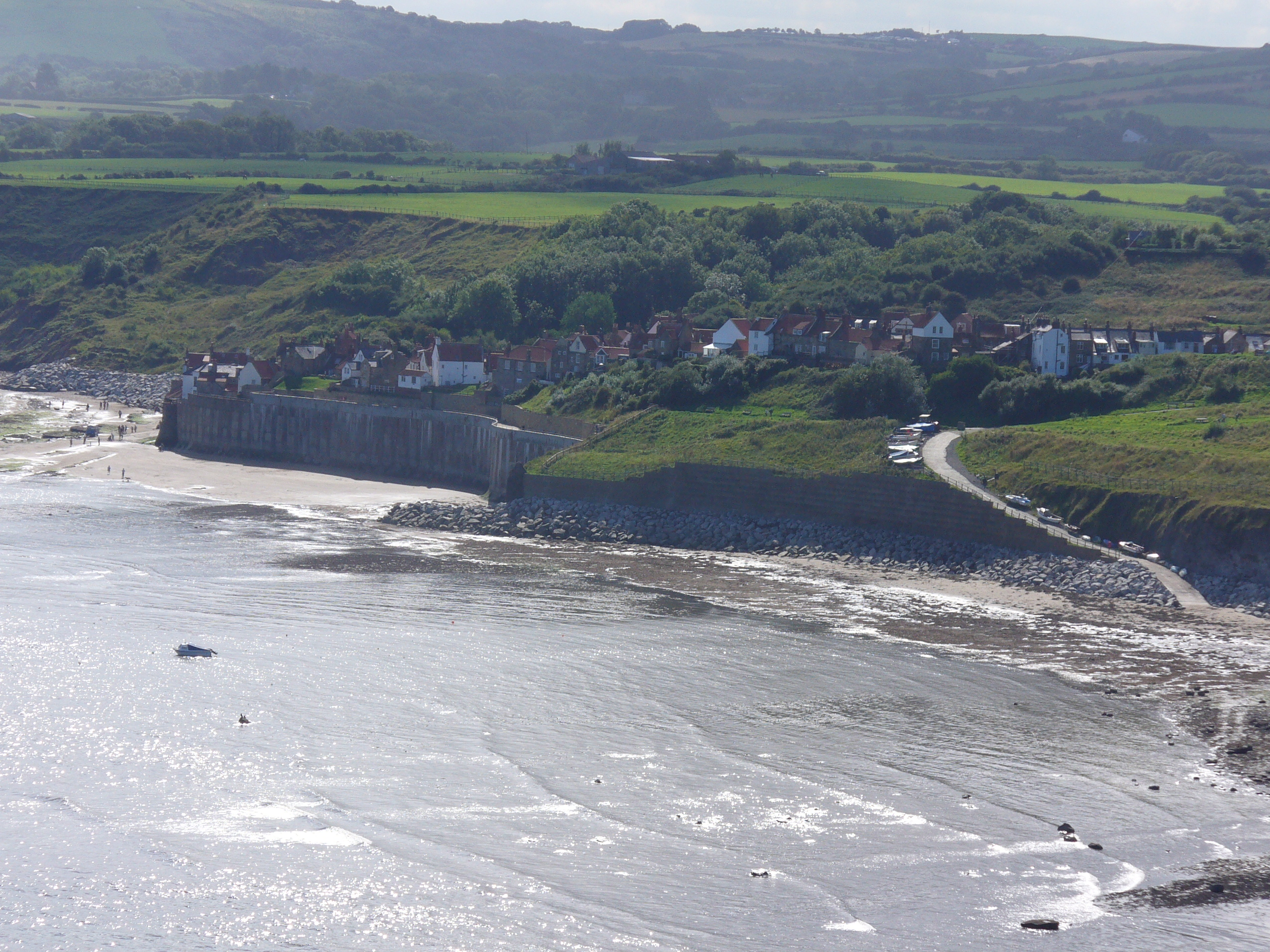
Robin Hood's Bay

== Additional sources ==
- Wainwright, Alfred (2003). A Coast to Coast Walk: A Pictorial Guide (Wainwright Pictorial Guides). London, UK: Frances Lincoln. ISBN 978-0-7112-2236-6.
