= Anna Troup =

British ultrarunner (born 1970)

Anna Troup (born 1970) is a British ultramarathon runner who, in 2021, achieved the fastest known time for a female completion of the Pennine Way. She is a qualified lawyer and works in financial management.

== Early life, education, and rowing ==
Troup has an MA in politics, philosophy and economics (PPE) from the University of Oxford and is a qualified lawyer, having trained at Slaughter and May. While at Oxford she rowed as stroke in the winning boat in the 1991 Women's Boat Race. She has been chair of the Oxford University Women's Boat Club and a member of the board of The Boat Race Company, which runs The Boat Race, and is on the board of the Leander Club.

== Running career ==
On 17 August 2021, Troup completed the 268-mile (431 km) Pennine Way in 72 h 46 min, breaking the fastest known time previously held by Sabrina Verjee who had completed in 74 h 28 min 19 s in 2020.

Troup is the female record holder for the Summer Spine Race covering 268 miles of the Pennine Way, having completed the 2022 race in a time of 78:57:49. She had previously won the 2021 Summer Spine Race in a time of 80:28:35.

Troup was the fastest female in the 2021 Lakeland 100 race, in which her partner, Richard Staite, was the fastest veteran; one of her daughters was the youngest finisher in the associated Lakeland 50 race, and her other daughter supported the family runners at the aid stations. She has also been fastest female in the 2020 Arc of Attrition 100, the Wendover Woods 100, and the Exodus 100, and has been placed in several other races.

== Personal life and employment ==
Troup's partner is ultrarunner Richard Staite, and she has two daughters who also compete in ultramarathons. She lives in Henley.

She works in financial management and, among other roles, is a non-executive director of the Charles Stanley Group and of T. Bailey Financial Services. She is a trustee of the Triathlon Trust.

In a 2019 interview, she said that her favourite book was Steve Peters's The Chimp Paradox; her favourite app, Strava; and her favourite quote, Henry Ford's words: "If you think you can do a thing or think you can't do a thing, you're right."
