= Sabrina Verjee =

British long-distance fell-runner

Sabrina Verjee (born 1980 or 1981) is a British long-distance fell-runner who held the overall record for the 325 mile circuit of the Wainwrights from June 2021 to May 2022 and the female record for the Pennine Way from September 2020 to August 2021.

== Early life and education ==
Verjee grew up in Surrey and studied human sciences at Oxford University. After a few months working as an investment banker she studied veterinary medicine at Cambridge, with a postgraduate certificate in emergency medicine and surgery. At both universities she ran and rowed, and at Cambridge she took up modern pentathlon and then adventure racing.

== Running ==
Verjee competed in, and won, her first ultramarathon, the Grand Tour of Skiddaw, in 2014.

In 2017 she competed in the Ultra-Trail du Mont-Blanc, finishing in 21st place, but did not enjoy the experience: "You climb to the top of the hill and all you can hear is these banging cowbells and shouting people, but it's so foreign to me because I actually go to the hills for peace and quiet. I just hated it".

=== Pennine Way ===
In Summer 2019 she was the overall winner of the Spine Fusion, a summer race which follows a similar route to the Pennine Way but is not identical, in a time of 81hrs 19mins. In January 2020 she finished fifth overall, and first woman, in the Spine Race, the equivalent winter race; her time was 108hrs 7 mins, outside the female race record of 83hrs 12mins set the previous year by Jasmin Paris.

In September 2020 Verjee set a female record for the fastest completion of the Pennine Way, finishing the 268 miles (431 km) run in 3 days 2hrs 28mins. This stood until August 2021 when Anna Troup set a new best time of 3 days 46 minutes.

=== Wainwrights ===
Verjee's first attempt at a tour of the 214 Wainwright summits in June 2020 was ended early due to COVID-19 restrictions. She tried again the following month and on 12 July, returned to her start point having visited all the 214 summits in 6 days, 17 hours and 51 minutes, a route of 325 miles (523 km) involving 36,000 metres (118,000 ft) of ascent. However, this was not claimed as a record for the challenge as she had received physical support because of knee problems ("I needed assistance down Clough Head to the Old Coach Road – I had to lean on little Dave to take the weight off"). In September of that year, Mel Steventon became the first woman known to have run all the Wainwrights in a continuous journey, with a time of 13 days 12 hours.

On 30 April 2021, Verjee began another effort on the route, aiming to complete in under six days, but had to stop after three days because the severe weather conditions were aggravating her asthma. She said: "This is not the conclusion I had anticipated and I am hugely disappointed. This story isn't over. I love running and I love exploring the Wainwrights. We have unfinished business."

She started a further attempt on 11 June 2021 and was successful, completing the tour of the Wainwrights in 5 days 23 hours 49 minutes and 12 seconds. This was the fastest time by anyone for the route. The overall record was broken on 7 May 2022 by 37-year-old American runner John Kelly who completed in a time of 5 days 12hrs 14mins 42secs, taking more than 11 hours off Verjee's time.

== Personal life ==
Verjee works as a vet in Carnforth and lives in Langdale with her three cats and husband.

On 21 August 2021 she was Simon Armitage's guest in his BBC Radio 4 programme The Poet Laureate Has Gone to His Shed.
