= Beth Pascall =

British ultrarunner

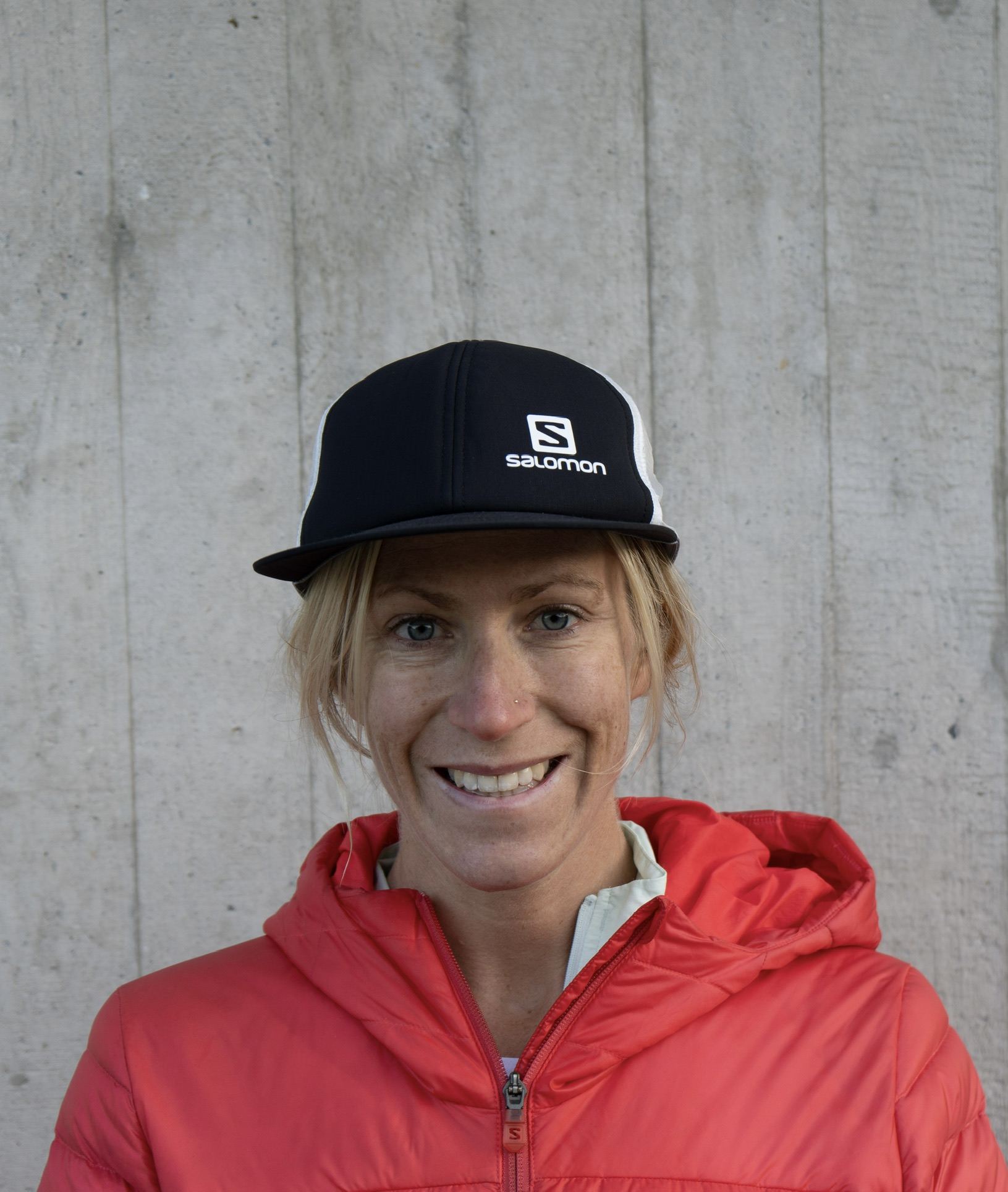
- Pascall in 2021

Personal information
- Full name: Elizabeth Pascall
- Born: 15 September 1987 (age 38)

Sport
- Country: Great Britain
- Sport: Trail running

Beth Pascall (born 15 September 1987) is a British ultrarunner and paediatrician. Among her victories are the Spine Race in 2015, the Ultra Trail Cape Town in 2019 and the Western States Endurance Run in 2021.

== Biography ==
Beth Pascall grew up on her parents' family farm. She didn't discover sport until she studied medicine at the University of Nottingham, where she took up rowing. While volunteering at a children's hospital in Zambia, she decided to specialise in paediatrics. She turned to trail running, as it was easier to balance with working life.

She launched herself directly into ultramarathon distances. In 2015, she was winner of the Spine Race.

In 2016, she took part in the Trail World Championships in Gerês where she finished eighth. Together with Jo Meek and Jo Zakrzewski, she won the bronze medal for Great Britain in the team classification.

In the 2018 Pascall and Damian Hall ran the Cape Wrath Trail, self-supported and during winter. They achieved a fastest known time, and a documentary Wrath was made following their attempt.

In 2019, she ran the Ultra Trail Cape Town. In the absence of rivals Courtney Dauwalter and Lucy Bartholomew, both of whom withdrew at the last moment, she dominated the race, completing the 100 kilometres (62 mi) course in 10:55:48 and setting a new women's course record.

In 2020, she took on the Bob Graham Round, taking advantage of the absence of competitions during the COVID-19 pandemic. Having trained specifically for the challenge, she aimed for a time of 15:23, one minute ahead of the record of Jasmin Paris. However, she completed the course in 14:34:26, improving the women's record by fifty minutes and setting the fourth-best overall time in the Bob Graham Round behind Kílian Jornet, Billy Bland and Rob Jebb.

In 2021, won the Canyon 100k in 10:01:55, more than half an hour ahead of her closest pursuer, Abby Hall. She then ran the Western States Endurance Run where she quickly took control of the race. Leading at a steady pace, she didn't let up, trying to maintain a lead over her pursuers Ruth Croft and Ragna Debats. She finally won in 17:10:42, finishing seventh overall and setting the second-best women's time in the event behind Ellie Greenwood's record of 16:47:19 set in 2012.

Following a pelvic injury, Pascall took up endurance gravel racing and mountain biking. In 2022, she won second place in the Raiders Gravel race in Scotland. She also set the speed record on the Lakeland 200k mountain biking route.
