= The Green Runners =

Environmentally-conscious running group

- Club logo
- Founded: 22 April 2022; 2 years ago
- Website: thegreenrunners.com

The Green Runners is a climate activism-focused running club based in the United Kingdom.

== History ==
Discussions between ultrarunners Dan Lawson and Damian Hall led to protests at COP26 in Glasgow 2021. They, along with Jasmin Paris, officially launched The Green Runners on 22 April 2022 (Earth Day) with as the first member. In 2023, they launched a partnership with England Athletics.

The Green Runners was nominated for Grassroots Organisation of the Year at the BBC Green Sport Awards in 2023 and 2024. Club member Innes FitzGerald won Young Athlete of the Year in 2023.
