= Ling Gill =

Nature reserve in North Yorkshire, England

- IUCN category IV (habitat/species management area)
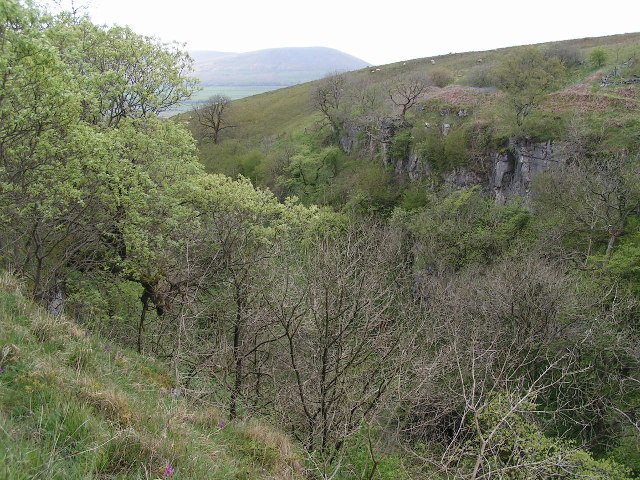
- View across the valle
- Interactive map of Ling Gill
- Location: Ribblesdale, North Yorkshire, England
- Nearest city: Horton-in-Ribblesdale
- Coordinates: 54°12′07″N 2°18′26″W
- Area: 5 hectares (12.4 acres)
- Designated: 1958 (SSSI); 1979 (NNR)
- Governing body: Natural England

Ling Gill is a gill (or narrow valley) in the Yorkshire Dales in North Yorkshire, England. Cam Beck, a tributary of the River Ribble, flows through the gill.

== Geography and hydrography ==
Ling Gill is a narrow, steep-sided limestone gorge located in Upper Ribblesdale, approximately 4 miles (6 km) north-east of Horton-in-Ribblesdale within the Yorkshire Dales National Park. The gorge extends for roughly 800 metres (875 yd) along an east-to-west axis at an elevation ranging from 310 to 360 metres (1,017 to 1,181 ft) above sea level.

The ravine was formed through post-glacial fluvial incision, where stream erosion cut down into the Carboniferous Great Scar Limestone group. The surrounding plateau consists of Yoredale Series sandstones and shales overlying the massive limestone beds. The vertical limestone walls of the gorge reach heights of up to 30 metres (98 ft), featuring prominent horizontal bedding planes, vertical joint fissures, and exposed scree slopes resulting from frost shattering.

Karst hydrogeology is evident throughout the ravine, where surface runoff from the acidic peat moorland of Cam Fell sinks into the porous limestone bedrock, feeding subterranean conduit systems and localized risings within the gorge floor.

The gorge is drained by Cam Beck, a major headwater stream of the River Ribble. Cam Beck rises on the slopes of Cam Fell to the north-east before descending rapidly into the head of Ling Gill. High rainfall across the surrounding peat catchment causes the stream to experience flash flooding, resulting in heavy scour along the gorge base during storm events. Upon emerging from the western mouth of the gorge near Nether Lodge, Cam Beck converges with Oughton Head Beck to form the main channel of the River Ribble.

== Flora and fauna ==
Recognized as a rare surviving example of semi-natural, sub-alpine ash woodland (Fraxinus excelsior) on Great Scar Limestone, protected from livestock grazing by its steep limestone cliffs. Accompanied by wych elm (Ulmus glabra), hazel (Corylus avellana), rowan (Sorbus aucuparia), bird cherry (Prunus padus), and blackthorn (Prunus spinosa). Supported by base-rich loams featuring dog's mercury (Mercurialis perennis), lily of the valley (Convallaria majalis), and over a dozen species of ferns, including hart's-tongue fern (Asplenium scolopendrium).

The Yorkshire Naturalists' Union identifies Ling Gill as the highest altitude station (330 metres above sea level) in North Yorkshire for this rare terrestrial snail, found along the limestone walls near Ling Gill Bridge and upper crag banks.

It serves as an important nesting habitat for upland and woodland birds, including the wood warbler, pied flycatcher, common buzzard, and grey wagtail.

== Conservation and access ==
The site is a Site of Special Scientific Interest and a national nature reserve, not open to the public. The Pennine Way passes the east end of the gill.

Unlike much of the Yorkshire Dales National Park, Ling Gill NNR is closed to the public (non-intervention scientific reserve) due to the extreme fragility of its flora and hazardous steep-sided gorge terrain.

== Human history ==
Ling Gill has long formed a natural landmark and obstacle along ancient transport routes in Upper Ribblesdale. The gorge is spanned at its eastern end by Ling Gill Bridge, a single-arch stone packhorse bridge constructed across Cam Beck. The bridge features a narrow paved causeway and plain parapets, with a datestone set into the structure inscribed "1729".

The bridge carried an important historic packhorse route connecting Horton-in-Ribblesdale and Gearstones with Hawes in Wensleydale, used for centuries to transport lime, coal, wool, and agricultural produce across the Pennines. The trackway crossing the bridge today forms part of the Pennine Way long-distance footpath. Recognizing its national historical and architectural importance, Ling Gill Bridge was designated a Grade II listed building and a Scheduled Monument in the 20th century.

In the 19th and early 20th centuries, the gorge attracted botanical collectors seeking rare cliff-dwelling ferns and mosses. Over-collection across the Yorkshire Dales during the Pteridomania (fern craze) era eventually contributed to strict statutory protections, culminating in the establishment of the National Nature Reserve in the post-war period to prevent further human disturbance.
