= John Kelly (runner) =

American runner (born 1984)

Personal information
- Full name: John Wade Kelly
- Nationality: American
- Citizenship: American
- Home town: Oak Ridge, Tennessee
- Education: Oak Ridge High School; North Carolina State University (M.S.); Carnegie Mellon University (Ph.D.)
- Occupation: Chief Technology Officer
- Employer: Envelop Risk Analytics
- Website: randomforestrunner.com

Sport
- Country: United States
- Sport: Endurance training Ultramarathon; Triathlon; Cycling

John Wade Kelly (born November 19, 1984) is an American endurance athlete who specializes in ultrarunning.

His fastest known times include that for the 268-mile Pennine Way, set in 2021.

== Early life ==
Kelly was raised in Morgan County, Tennessee, and graduated from nearby Oak Ridge High School in 2003. He was a good but not outstanding runner in high school, after which he did not compete in the sport for several years until 2013, when he ran the Marine Corps Marathon. After subsequently qualifying for the Boston Marathon, he decided to use ultramarathons and triathlons to maintain his fitness and motivation.

== American ultras and triathlons ==
In 2017, Kelly became the fifteenth finisher in the history of the Barkley Marathons. He completed the required five loops in a total time of 59:30:53, around half an hour inside the time limit for the full course. It was his third attempt at the race, having managed three loops in 2015 and four in 2016. Later in 2017, Kelly won the Road Runners Club of America National Ultra Championship at the Lookout Mountain 50 Miler.

The next year, he set a course record of 23:48:00 at the Wild Oak Trail Run in Virginia and was an age group champion at the ITU Long Distance Triathlon World Championships. Thereafter, Kelly became a professional triathlete for just one race, Ironman Arizona, before turning his attention more closely to ultrarunning.

He won the Franklins 200 Mile race in Texas in February 2019 in a time of 60:53:12.

== British races and records ==
Soon after his Franklins win, Kelly moved with his family to the UK, and in late May 2019, he began an attempt at what he termed the Grand Round. This involved consecutively running the three best-known fell running rounds (the Paddy Buckley in Wales, the Bob Graham in England and the Ramsay in Scotland) and getting between them by cycling. On this occasion, Kelly was able to complete the Paddy Buckley Round, cycle to Keswick, and finish the Bob Graham Round. He then began the cycling section towards Fort William, but safety concerns relating to tiredness led him to abandon the challenge.

In January 2020, Kelly took first place at the Spine Race, the route of which largely follows the Pennine Way. He completed the course of approximately 268 miles (431 km) in a time of 87:53. Late in the race, he was challenged by Jayson Cavill, but Cavill was forced to drop out due to tendonitis and Kelly was ultimately left with a comfortable margin of victory.

Kelly revisited the Pennine Way in July the same year. With more daylight and the expectation of better weather than in the Spine Race, as well as not having to carry as much equipment, he aimed to beat Mike Hartley’s 1989 record of 65:20. Despite losing time against his schedule in the second half of the run, Kelly was fast enough to set a new record of 64:46. He ran the route in the south to north direction, from Edale to Kirk Yetholm, in contrast to Hartley's north to south traverse. Although Hartley's best had stood for over thirty years, Kelly's record of 64:46 only lasted eight days until it was beaten by Damian Hall who completed the Way in 61:35.

In August 2020, Kelly returned to the Grand Round, which involves a running distance of about 185 miles (298 km) with around 25,440 metres (83,460 ft) of elevation gain, as well as over 400 miles (640 km) of cycling. He finished the route in a total time of 130:43. This was the first time that the Grand Round had been completed. In 1990, Mike Hartley had run the three rounds in a total time from start to finish of 86:20, but he had used motorized transport between the rounds rather than cycling. Due to the connections with Hartley, Kelly referred to the Pennine Way run and the Grand Round collectively as the Hartley Slam.

Kelly made a further attempt on the Pennine Way in May 2021, hoping to avoid the gastrointestinal problems which had restricted him the previous year. This time he ran the Way from north to south, as Hartley and Hall had done on their record runs. Despite periods of heavy rain, Kelly finished the 260 miles (420 km) in a time of 58:04, reducing the record by over three hours.

In July 2021, Kelly set out to run a circuit of the 214 Wainwrights in the Lake District but foot problems and high temperatures caused an end to the undertaking. Shortly before returning to the United States, he attempted the Wainwrights a second time in May 2022 and completed the whole route in a record time of 5 days, 12 hours, 14 minutes, beating the previous record set by Sabrina Verjee by 11 hours and 35 minutes.

== Return to the US ==
Kelly was tenth man in the Hardrock 100 in 2022. Later in the year, in a change to his accustomed distance and terrain, he ran a time of 2:26:50 at the California International Marathon.

In March 2023 Kelly finished the Barkley Marathons for a second time, with a time of 58:42:23. In March 2024 Kelly became the second three-time finisher of the Barkley Marathons with a time of 59:15:38. He is the third person to complete the course more than once.

== Data science career ==
Kelly has a M.S. from North Carolina State University and a Ph.D. in electrical engineering and machine learning from Carnegie Mellon University. He works as Chief Technology Officer of Envelop Risk Analytics, having previously been the Technical Lead for Corporate Data Analytics Lockheed Martin as well as the Director of Analytics at QxBranch.

== List of Fastest Known Times (FKTs) ==
The following table includes all of Kelly's Fastest Known Times (FKTs), whether they are still the FKT on the given route or have since been bested (by either Kelly or another athlete). The list is accurate as of May 29, 2025, while Kelly was in the midst of attempting to set the FKT for the Appalachian Trail.

John Kelly's Fastest Known Times (FKTs)
Route	Route Variation	Style	Time	Date	Current Status
Long Trail	Standard route	Supported	4d 4h 25m 50s	2023-07-03	No longer standing
Wainwrights 214	Open course	Supported	5d 12h 14m 43s	2022-05-07	Still standing
Pennine Way	Standard route	Supported	2d 10h 4m 53s	2021-05-17	Still standing
Mendip Way	West Mendip Way	Unsupported	3h 49m 5s	2021-04-10	No longer standing
Community Forest Path	Loop	Unsupported	7h 6m 43s	2021-02-27	No longer standing
Big 3 UK Rounds (Paddy Buckley Round, Bob Graham Round, and Charlie Ramsay Round)	Grand Round (cycling between)	Supported	5d 10h 43m 0s	2020-08-21	Still standing
Pennine Way	Standard route	Supported	2d 16h 46m 0s	2020-07-16	No longer standing
Somerset Three Peaks (Maes Knoll, Knowle Hill, and Blackberry Hill)	Standard loop	Unsupported	1h 56m 21s	2020-06-07	Still standing
Rock Creek Trail	Standard route	Supported	5h 8m 51s	2019-02-23	Still standing
Smokies Challenge Adventure Run (S.C.A.R.)	S.C.A.R.	Unsupported	15h 31m 37s	2018-03-18	No longer standing
AT Four State Challenge (PA, MD, WV, VA)	Standard route	Supported	6h 39m 51s	2018-01-20	No longer standing
