= Spine Race =

British ultramarathon on Pennine Way

The Spine Race is an ultramarathon held over a distance of around 268 miles (431 km) from Edale, England, to Kirk Yetholm, Scotland, along the Pennine Way. Participants are allowed seven days to complete the course. The race has been held annually since 2012. Initially held in the winter only, a summer version was introduced in 2017. The events are now known as the Winter Spine Race and Summer Spine Race.

The series have subsequently been expanded to five concurrent events held twice a year:

The Spine Races
Event	Distance	Start	Finish	Time allowed (hours)	Notes
Winter/Summer Spine Race	268 miles (431 km)	Edale	Kirk Yetholm	168 (winter) 156 (summer)	
Winter/Summer Challenger South	108 miles (174 km)	Edale	Hardraw	60	Challenger South was originally called the Spine Flare
Winter/Summer Challenger North	160 miles (260 km)	Hardraw	Kirk Yetholm	108 (winter) 90 (summer)	The time limit for the summer event was reduced from 108 to 90 hours from 2023 onwards.
Winter/Summer Sprint South	46 miles (74 km)	Edale	Hebden Bridge	18	
Winter/Summer Sprint North	43 miles (69 km)	Brown Rigg	Kirk Yetholm	18	

== History ==
The event was devised by Arctic expedition guides Scott Gilmour and Phil Hayday-Brown. The inaugural race took place in 2012 when there were only three finishers from a small field of eleven competitors.

The 2013 event was promoted as the Dare 2b Spine Race but later that year it was announced that Montane would take on sponsorship of the event.

In the 2014 and later editions, participants carried GPS trackers for safety reasons and so that the progress of the race could be publicly followed online as it took place. Starting in 2016, daily video summaries were made available during the race.

Due to the time of year and race location, the majority of the winter event takes place in darkness. Snow, ice and strong winds are common. Severe weather was a factor in 2015 in particular, when racers were held at various checkpoints for significant amounts of time until it was considered safe for them to continue. Some competitors that year were also redirected between Middleton and Alston to avoid sections of high ground, including Cross Fell, during the inclement weather.

Participants wear or carry mandatory clothing and equipment over the full course and have access to an additional drop bag which is transported along the route for them and made available at checkpoints. Individual support crews for the runners were allowed in the past but from 2018 were no longer permitted.

The 2019 race received considerable media attention when the overall win was taken by British women's fell running champion Jasmin Paris.

Runners were taken by motorised transport between Bellingham and Byrness in Northumberland during the 2022 race, due to many trees on or near that section of the route having been blown down by Storm Arwen. This reduced the course distance by about 15 miles (24 km).

The Summer Spine Race was formerly known as Spine Fusion and is a summer version of the Spine Race, covering the full route from Edale to Kirk Yetholm.

== Route ==
The Spine Race closely follows the Pennine Way but involves some slight deviations such as the access to and departure from the Hebden checkpoint. The runners are not required to complete the out-and-back section of the Way to The Cheviot. Racers generally follow the lower-level Pennine Way route option on the approach to Kirk Yetholm rather than the alternative over White Law.

The route has approximately 13,300 metres (43,600 ft) of ascent. The timing points and approximate distances of the main checkpoints along the route are as follows.

Location	Distance
Torside	
Harrop	
Hebden	74 kilometres (46 mi)
Malham	
Hawes	172 kilometres (107 mi)
Tan Hill	
Middleton	226 kilometres (140 mi)
Dufton	
Alston	289 kilometres (180 mi)
Greenhead	
Bellingham	353 kilometres (219 mi)
Byrness	
Hut 2	
Finish	421 kilometres (262 mi)

== Results ==
=== Winter ===
The winners have been as follows.

Year	Men	Time	Women	Time
2012	Gary Morrison and Steve Thompson	151:02:00	None	
2013	Eugeni Roselló Sole	124:52:00	Annabel Gates	172:59:00
2014	Pavel Paloncy	110:45:00	Debbie Brupbacher	153:17:00
2015 (Note: The results from 2015 are not considered for course records due to significant course changes.)	Pavel Paloncy	81:34:00	Beth Pascall	90:59:00
2016	Eoin Keith	95:17:00	Anna Buckingham and Zoe Thornburgh	166:38:00
2017	Tom Hollins	99:25:36	Carol Morgan	109:54:00
2018	Pavel Paloncy	109:50:22	Carol Morgan	130:37:22
2019	Eoin Keith	98:18:23	Jasmin Paris	83:12:23
2020	John Kelly	87:53:57	Sabrina Verjee	108:07:17
2021	Cancelled due to the COVID-19 pandemic			
2022	Eoin Keith	92:40:30	Debbie Martin-Consani	104:08:22
2023	Damian Hall	84:36:24	Claire Bannwarth	97:39:58
2024	Jack Scott	72:55:05	Claire Bannwarth	92:02:23
2025	Kim Collison	82:46:32	Lucy Gossage	87:41:38
2026	Sebastien Raichon	95:43:52	Anna Troup	106:19:12

=== Summer ===
The winners have been as follows.

Year	Men	Time	Women	Time
2017	Mark Kromeich and Olivier Lidec	128:54:24	Stephanie Le Men	143:59:22
2018	Mark Denby	78:04:14	Brigitte Daxelhoffer	131:07:13
2019	Esteban Díaz	89:57:48	Sabrina Verjee	81:19:07
2020	Cancelled due to the COVID-19 pandemic			
2021	Eoin Keith	77:34:52	Anna Troup	80:28:35
2022	Tiaan Erwee	70:46:50	Anna Troup	78:57:49
2023	Dave Phillips	76:59:33	Jenny Yeo	101:39:50
2024	Chris Cope	79:10:14	Sue Straw	122:43:49
2025	Shane Morgan	91:45:56	Anna Troup	84:56:37

== Spine Challenger South ==
Originally call the Spine Challenger, the event is a shorter version of the Spine Race and follows the first 108 miles (174 km) of the route, starting in Edale and finishing in Hawes or in neighbouring Hardraw in North Yorkshire in some years. It starts the day before the full Spine Race. There is also a version of the Challenger specifically for members of mountain rescue teams, held in winter only.

A summer version of the Challenger called the Spine Flare was first held in 2017.

The events were renamed the Spine Challenger South in 2022 with the introduction of the Spine Challenge North in January 2022.

The Winter 2026 event was affected by death threats being made against humanitarian Sarah Porter who had entered the race. The race organisers felt it necessary to withdraw her from the race part way through due to the situation.

=== Winter results ===
The winners of the Spine Challenger South have been as follows.

Year	Men	Time	Women	Time
2012	Mark Brooks	36:30:00	None	
2013	Philippe Gatta	32:18:00	Anne Green	53:38:00
2014	Marcus Scotney	29:01:00	Jacqueline Cooper	42:13:00
2015	Edward Catmur	29:52:00	Annabel Cremin	41:59:00
2016	Tom Hollins	29:25:00	Beth Pascall	30:18:00
2017	Dominic Layfield	28:00:28	Sarah Davies	37:49:50
2018	Wouter Huitzing	25:42:21	Emma Hopkinson	29:39:35
2019	Jim Mann	22:53:28	Carol Morgan	31:47:37
2020	Douglas Zinis	29:00:32	Elaine Bisson	34:19:05
2021	Cancelled due to the COVID-19 pandemic			
2022	Josh Wade	24:54:50	Kendra Wedgwood	46:09:30
2023	Rory Harris	26:25:30	Sarah Hodgson	33:26:44
2024	Daniel Weller	24:48:21	Samantha Lissauer	33:16:28
2025	James Allen	34:39:43	Alice Kershaw	43:14:43
2026	Jack Scott	25:12:00	Sarah Page	29:03:20 (Note: Not classed as a new course record as a significant course deviation was in force which reduced the overall distance)

=== Summer ===
The winners have been as follows.

Year	Men	Time	Women	Time
2017	Mark Denby	23:53:36	Lisa Wallis	31:33:56
2018	Michael Harrison	27:45:02	Beverley Clifford	35:38:11
2019	Benjamin Tyas	27:38:21	Saki Nakamura	32:11:22
2020	Cancelled due to the COVID-19 pandemic			
2021	Mark Potts	24:34:24	Victoria Morris	32:20:14
2022	Tim Pigott	23:02:01	Lauren Johnson	30:04:31
2023	Jon Shield	27:53:52	Mel Sykes	32:22:19
2024	Rupert Allison	22:31:02	Ursula Sullivan	31:05:00
2025	Chris Andrade	24:19:46	Eleanor Walker	34:59:48

== Spine Challenger North ==
Introduced in 2022 the Challenger North events start at Hardraw, the finishing point of the Challenger South events, and finish at Kirk Yetholm. A distance of 160 miles (260 km) are to be covered in a maximum of 108 hours (in winter) and 90 hours (in summer). Only run in winter in 2022, a summer event was added in 2023.

=== Winter results ===
The results have been:

Year	Men	Time	Women	Time
2022	Simon Roberts	43:48:17	Victoria Morris	52:51:38
2023	G Brian Hutchinson	61:13:59	Irene Kinnegin	72:16:52
2024	Joe O'Leary	44:37:20	Nikki Arthur	52:17:19
2025	Paul Grundy	48:03:07	Nicky Spinks	56:49:55
2026	Harry Firth	46:00:29	Elaine Bisson and Nicky Spinks	55:57:59

=== Summer Results ===
The results have been:

Year	Men	Time	Women	Time
2023	Jovica Spajic and Tom Hill	39:45:55	Eloise Eccles	56:04:04
2024	Joe Horne	44:52:01	Emma Hopkinson	50:24:02
2025	James Hargreaves	40:17:55	Allie Bailey	53:11:57

== Spine Sprint South ==
Also new for summer 2021 was the Spine Sprint events. Starting at Edale, the races finish at Hebden Bridge, a distance of 46 miles (74 km). The time limit is 18 hours. A winter event was added for 2022. From summer 2025 the event was renamed the Spine Sprint South following the introduction of the Spine Sprint North.

=== Winter results ===
The winners have been:

Year	Men	Time	Women	Time
2022	Jonathan Price	10:03:03	Alice Kershaw	12:16:15
2023	Jon Shield	08:10:22	Louise Venables	11:39:21
2024	Rupert Allison	07:29:09	Jessica Johnson	10:04:42
2025	Paul Brennan	09:26:48	Hannah Bruce	12:53:47
2026	Joe Leadley	08:17:58	Sophie Littlefair	11:00:12

=== Summer results ===
The winners have been:

Year	Men	Time	Women	Time
2021	Niki Worrall	07:30:00	Sara Abbott, Sue Straw, Lynne Murphy	09:54:01
2022	Michael Hyde	07:55:58	Hannah Slater	09:33:31
2023	Rupert Allison	06:59:40	Hannah Rickman	08:41:39
2024	Stephen Earle	08:21:49	Molly Browne	08:30:29
2025	Chris Cope	06:36:41	Victoria Thompson	07:49:44

== Spine Sprint North ==
The Spine Sprint North was introduced in summer 2025, a 43 mile race from Brown Rigg, Bellingham to Kirk Yetholm with a time limit of 18 hours. A winter event was introduced in January 2026.

=== Winter results ===
Year	Men	Time	Women	Time
2026	Damian Hall and Jon Shield	08:06:51	Louise Goddard	11:53:25

=== Summer results ===
The winners have been:

Year	Men	Time	Women	Time
2025	Matias Morgan	08:51:55	Louise Goddard	09:05:51
