= Pennine Way =

268-mile footpath in England and Scotland

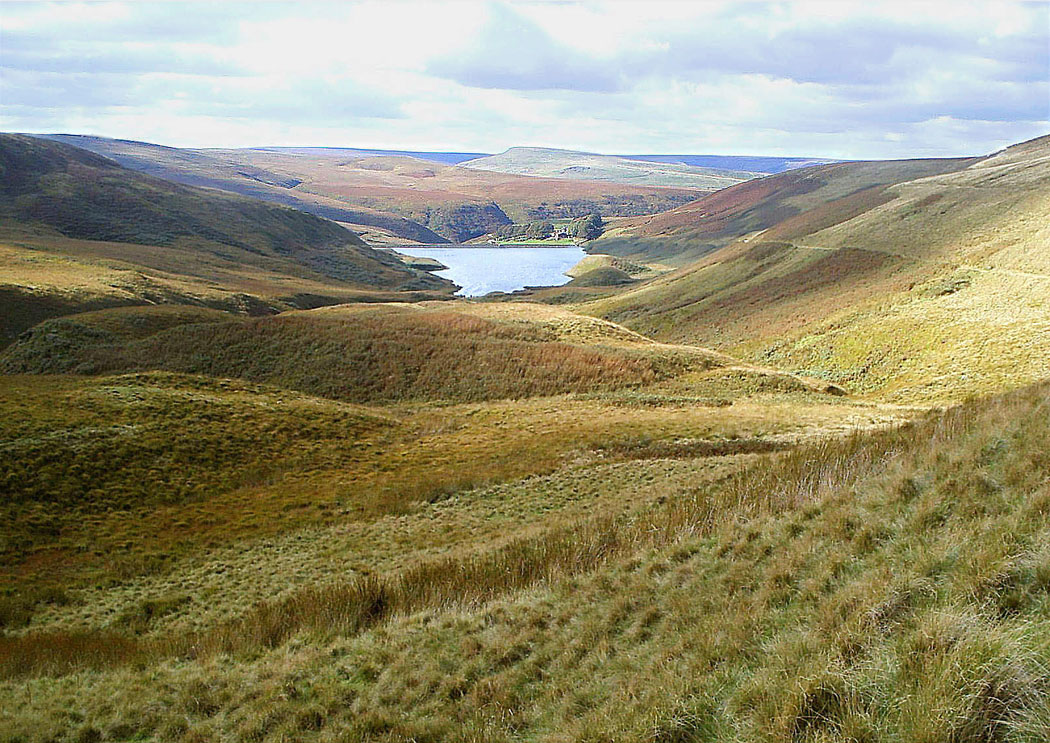
- View from the Pennine Way, near Marsden, West Yorkshire
- Length: 268 miles (431 km)
- Location: Northern England and southern Scotland, United Kingdom
- Designation: UK National Trail
- Trailheads: Edale, Derbyshire; Kirk Yetholm, Scottish Borders
- Use: Hiking
- Highest point: Cross Fell, 893 m (2,930 ft)
- Difficulty: Moderate to Strenuous
- Season: All year
- Hazards: Severe weather

The Pennine Way is a National Trail in England, with a small section in Scotland. The trail stretches for 268 miles (431 km) from Edale, in the northern Derbyshire Peak District, north through the Yorkshire Dales and Northumberland National Park and ends at Kirk Yetholm, just inside the Scottish border. The path runs along the Pennine hills, sometimes described as the "backbone of England". Although not the United Kingdom's longest National Trail, (Note: This distinction belongs to the 2,689-mile (4,328 km) King Charles III England Coast Path.) it is, according to the Ramblers, "one of Britain's best known and toughest".

== History ==
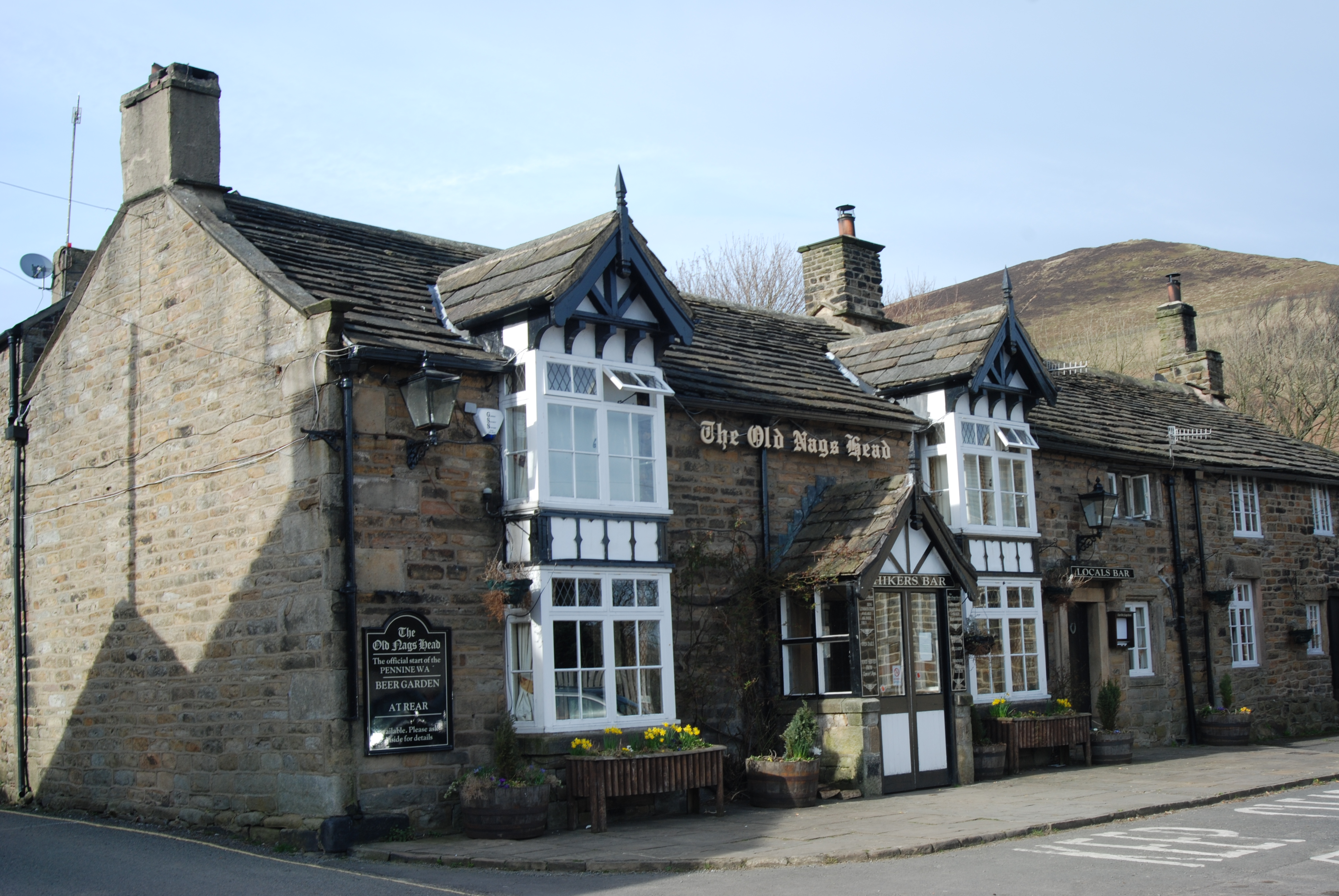
Old Nags Head, in Edale, Derbyshire. The traditional starting point of the Pennine Way.

The path was the idea of the journalist and rambler Tom Stephenson, inspired by similar trails in the United States, particularly the Appalachian Trail. Stephenson proposed the concept in an article for the Daily Herald in 1935, and lobbied Parliament for the creation of an official trail. The walk was planned to end at Wooler, but it was decided that Kirk Yetholm, a few miles west of Wooler, would be the finishing point. The final section was declared open in a ceremony held on Malham Moor on 24 April 1965. Before the official opening of the Pennine Way, the British Army was invited to test the route, a task that was accomplished in one day. Junior soldiers from the Junior Tradesman's Regiment of the Army Catering Corps, based in Aldershot, were split into patrols of four or five and each was allocated an approximately 15-mile (25 km) section of the walk. A report was then provided on the signage and route feasibility.

The Pennine Way celebrated its 50th anniversary in April 2015. A special four-part BBC One series The Pennine Way was broadcast throughout April.

== Usage ==
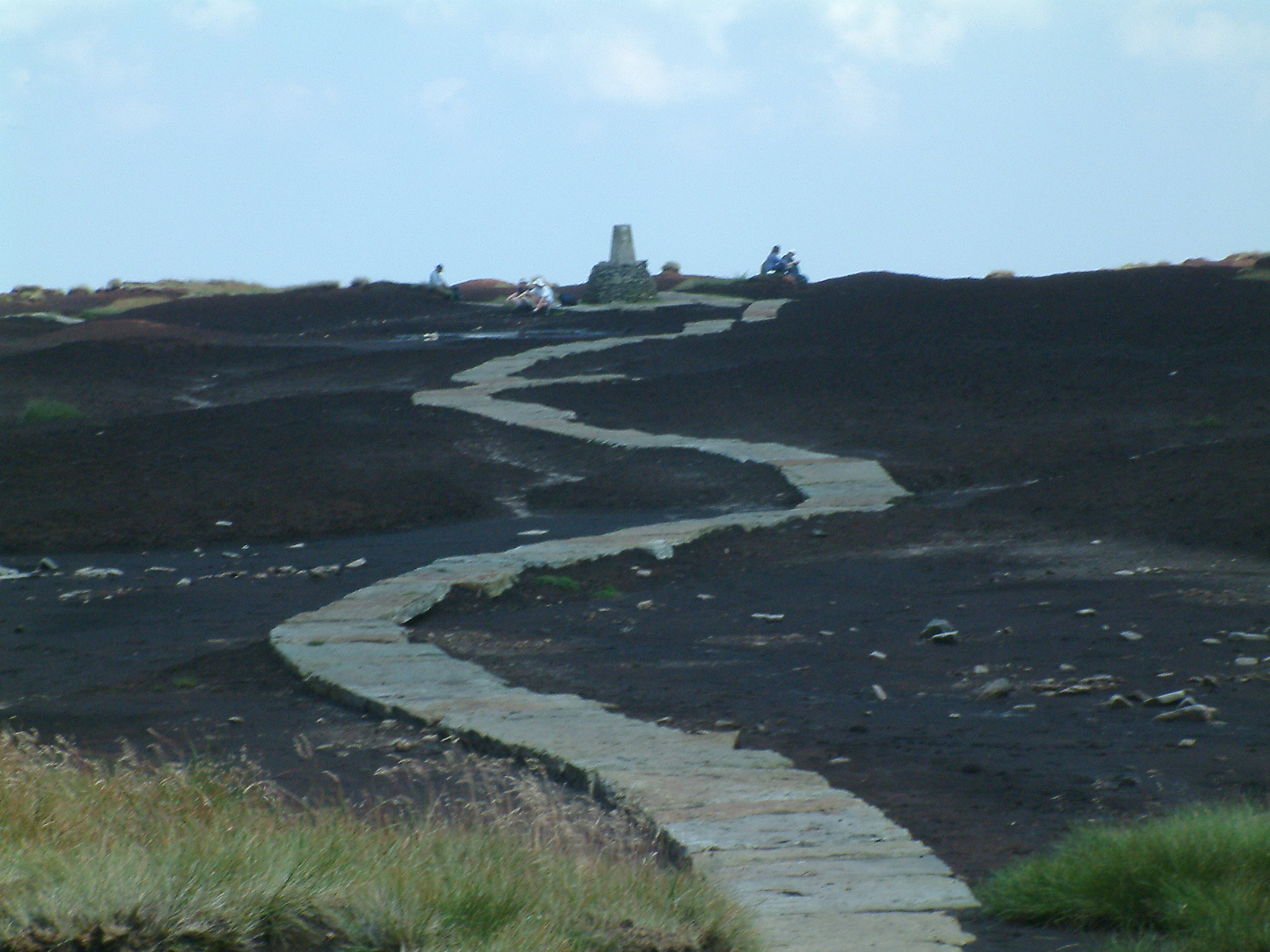
Paved surface of the Pennine Way on Black Hill in West Yorkshire

The Pennine Way is popular with walkers, and in 1990 the Countryside Commission reported that 12,000 long-distance walkers and 250,000 day-walkers were using all or part of the trail annually and that walkers contributed £2 million (1990) to the local economy along the route, directly maintaining 156 jobs. The popularity of the walk has resulted in substantial erosion to the terrain in places, and steps have been taken to recover its condition, including diverting sections of the path onto firmer ground, and laying flagstones or duckboards in softer areas. The actions have been effective in reducing the extent of broken ground, though the intrusion into the natural landscape has at times been controversial.

Accommodation is available at youth hostels, camp sites, bed-and-breakfasts and pubs, but is limited on upland stretches, so when planning the walk one must sometimes choose between a long day (between two places offering on-route accommodation) or two shorter days involving an evening descent off-route (to a nearby village or farm) with a morning re-ascent.

There are 535 access points where the Pennine Way intersects with other public rights of way. The route is crossed by many roads and passes through many villages and towns with good public transport. This makes it easy to sample a short section of the trail, or to split the Pennine Way across several holidays or long weekends.

Most of the Pennine Way is on public footpaths, rather than bridleways, and not accessible to travellers on horseback or bicycle, but a roughly parallel Pennine Bridleway is open from Derbyshire to Cumbria. This route, open to anyone not using motorised vehicles, starts slightly farther south than the Pennine Way.

== Route ==
Common stops along the Pennine Way

A survey by the National Trails agency reported that a walker covering the entire length of the trail is obliged to navigate 287 gates, 249 timber stiles, 183 stone stiles and 204 bridges. 198 miles (319 km) of the route is on public footpaths, 70 miles (112 km) on public bridleways and 20 miles (32 km) on other public highways. The walker is aided by the provision of 458 waymarks.

=== Peak District National Park ===
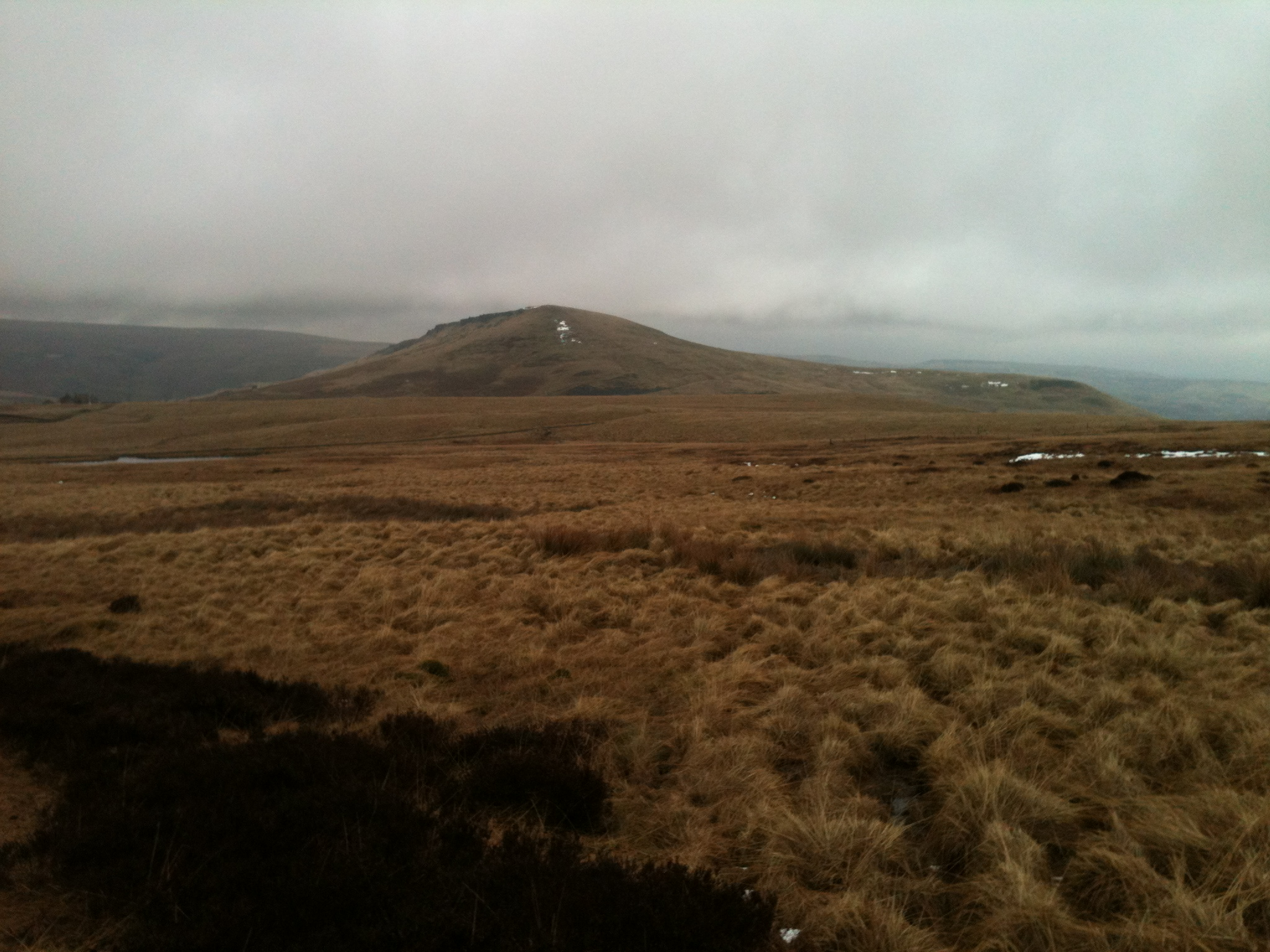
Pule Hill, as visible from the Pennine Way along the Standedge Circuit

The Pennine Way originally climbed north from Edale across the middle of the Kinder Scout plateau. It was rerouted to reduce erosion, and now heads west to climb onto the plateau by steps known as Jacob's Ladder. It then turns north to follow the western edge of the plateau past Kinder Downfall, crosses the Snake Pass road (A57) and climbs Bleaklow. From the summit the trail descends to Longdendale. In the dale it crosses the dam of Torside Reservoir to Crowden, the first village since the start of the trail 16 miles (26 km) away.

From Crowden the Pennine Way climbs a side valley past Laddow Rocks to the summit of Black Hill on the border of Yorkshire. It descends across Wessenden Head Moor (the eastern part of Saddleworth Moor) and the A635 road to the Wessenden Valley. It climbs out of the valley to leave the National Park at Standedge on the A62 road.

=== South Pennines ===
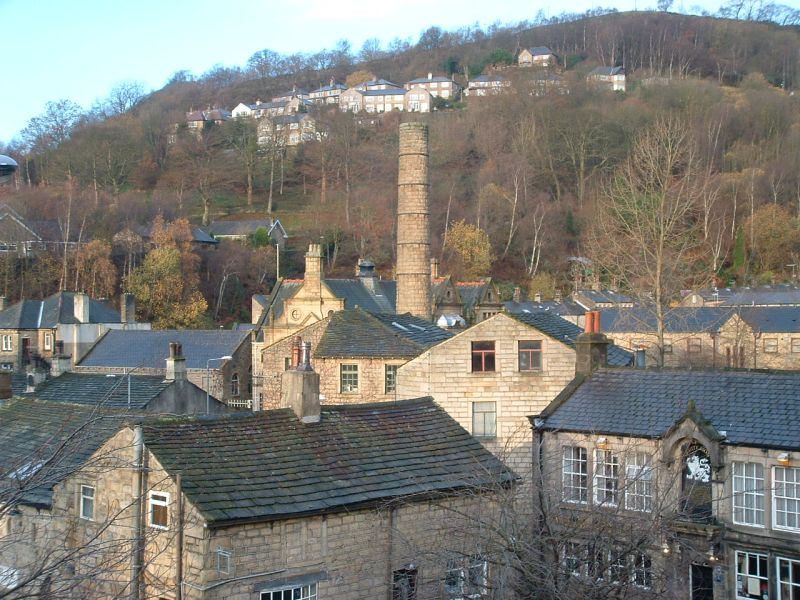
Hebden Bridge

From Standedge the Pennine Way follows the Yorkshire–Greater Manchester border north along a series of gritstone edges. It crosses the A640 road, then the A672, before crossing the M62 motorway by a long footbridge near Windy Hill. Past the motorway the trail follows Blackstone Edge to the A58 road, then passes a series of reservoirs. It crosses the Calderdale Way high above the village of Mankinholes, then climbs to the prominent monument on Stoodley Pike. From the monument it descends steeply to the valley of the River Calder, which it crosses about 1 mile (1.6 km) west of the town of Hebden Bridge, the largest settlement near the route.

The trail climbs out of the Calder valley through the scattered hamlet of Colden, crossing Colden Water by an ancient clapper bridge. It then passes the Walshaw Dean Reservoirs and climbs to the ruins of Top Withens, said to have been the inspiration for Wuthering Heights. The trail then descends to Ponden Hall, and crosses more moorland to the villages of Cowling and Lothersdale.

From Lothersdale the trail crosses Pinhaw Beacon to Thornton-in-Craven. There then follows gentler country, including a short section of the towpath of the Leeds and Liverpool Canal at East Marton, to reach the village of Gargrave in Airedale, on the busy A65.

=== Yorkshire Dales National Park ===
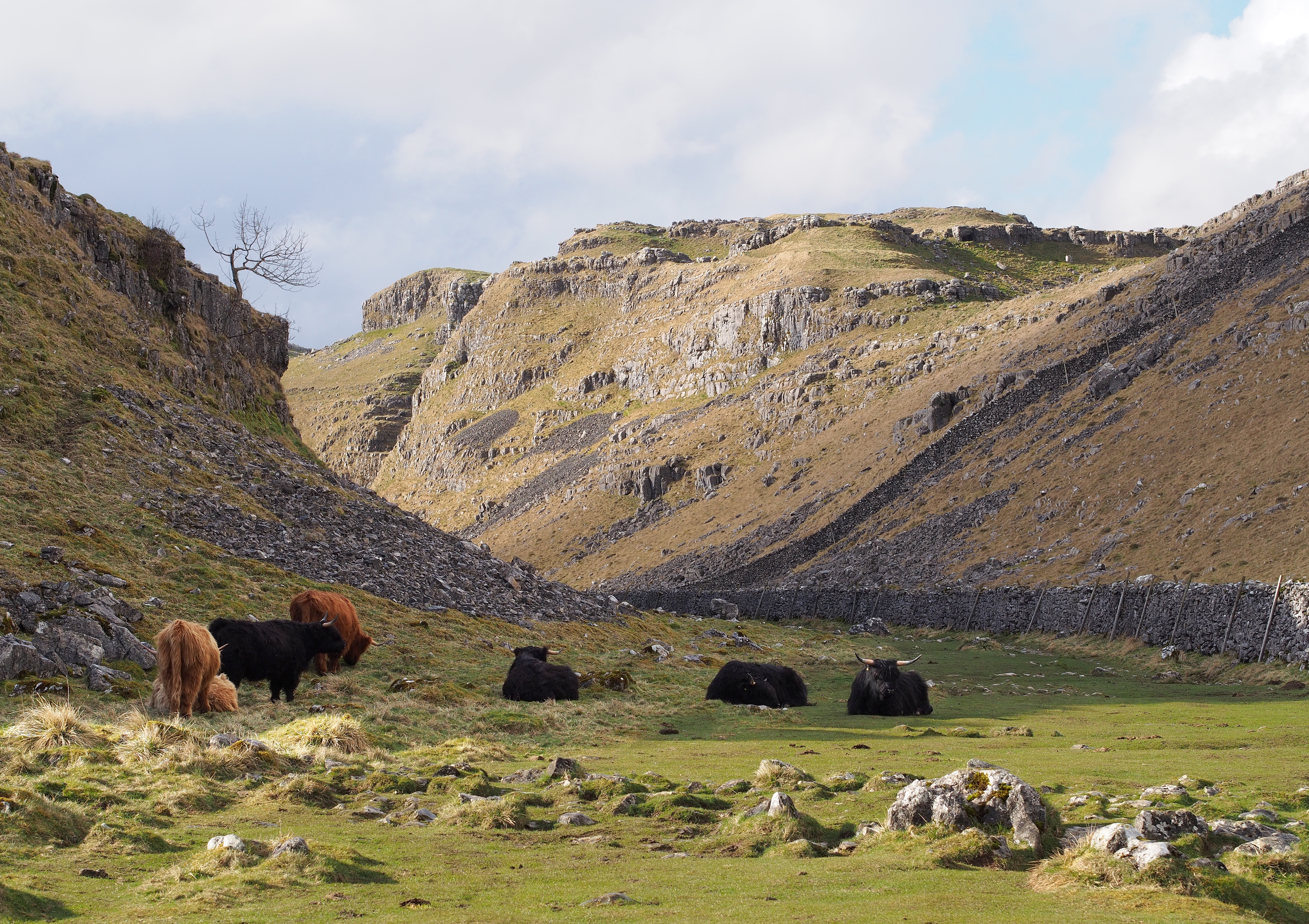
Highland Cattle on the Pennine Way, above Malham Cove, with Ing Scar in the background

North of Gargrave the Pennine Way ascends Airedale and enters the Yorkshire Dales National Park. It follows field paths, through the small villages of Airton and Hanlith to the larger village of Malham. It then climbs steps on the west side of Malham Cove, traverses the limestone pavement at the top of the cove, and continues north to Malham Tarn. The trail then crosses a shoulder of Fountains Fell, crosses the head of Silverdale and ascends the nose of Pen-y-Ghent in a very steep section. From the summit of Pen-y-Ghent the Pennine Way descends to the village of Horton in Ribblesdale (on the Settle–Carlisle Railway).

The Pennine Way then heads up Ribblesdale along the old Settle–Langstrothdale packhorse road. It passes the eastern end of Ling Gill and climbs Cam Fell, where it follows the line of a Roman road, shared with the Dales Way. The trail then passes Dodd Fell Hill and follows a ridge between Widdale and Sleddale, before descending into Wensleydale at Gayle and the adjoining town of Hawes.

The path crosses the dale to Hardraw, then begins the 5-mile (8 km) ascent of Great Shunner Fell. From the summit of the fell the trail descends to upper Swaledale and the village of Thwaite. It then crosses the side of Kisdon, with good views down Swaledale, passes Kisdon Force, a waterfall on the River Swale, and reaches the village of Keld.

From Keld the path crosses the route of the Coast to Coast Walk, then ascends a side valley known as Stones Dale to reach Tan Hill and its isolated inn at the northern boundary of the National Park.

=== North Pennines ===
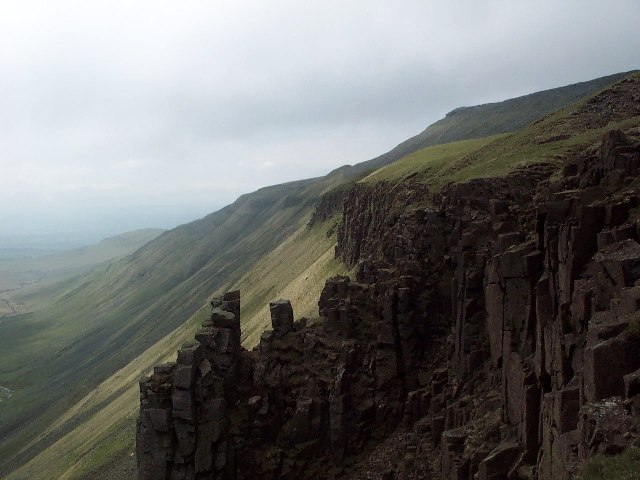
High Cup Gill in Cumbria

At Tan Hill the Pennine Way enters the North Pennines AONB and follows moorland tracks to the isolated settlement of Sleightholme, where the route divides. The main route heads directly north across the moors, crossing God's Bridge and passing beneath the A66 road in a tunnel. The alternative route enters the town of Bowes and rejoins the main route at Baldersdale. From Baldersdale the trail crosses Lunedale and descends to the small town of Middleton-in-Teesdale.

From Middleton the path ascends Teesdale on the right bank of the River Tees, below the village of Holwick. It passes the waterfalls of Low Force and High Force, and reaches the scattered settlement of Forest-in-Teesdale. Further up the Tees, the path climbs beside the waterfall of Cauldron Snout below the dam of Cow Green Reservoir. The trail then ascends the gently rising side valley of Maize Beck to reach High Cup Gill, one of the most photographed areas on the Pennine Way. From High Cup the trail descends to the village of Dufton.

From Dufton the Pennine Way climbs back up the fells, passing in turn the summits of Knock Fell, Great Dun Fell, Little Dun Fell and finally Cross Fell, at 893 metres (2,930 ft) the highest point on the entire path. Here, walkers can face tricky conditions in bad weather as a result of the Helm Wind which sweeps down the south-west slope of the escarpment. A long descent follows to the valley of the South Tyne at Garrigill. The trail then keeps close to the river to enter the town of Alston.

The trail continues down the valley of the South Tyne, past the Roman fort of Whitley Castle, to Slaggyford and Knarsdale. Above the village of Lambley the trail leaves the valley to cross more moorland to the A69 near the village of Greenhead.

=== Northumberland National Park and the Scottish border ===
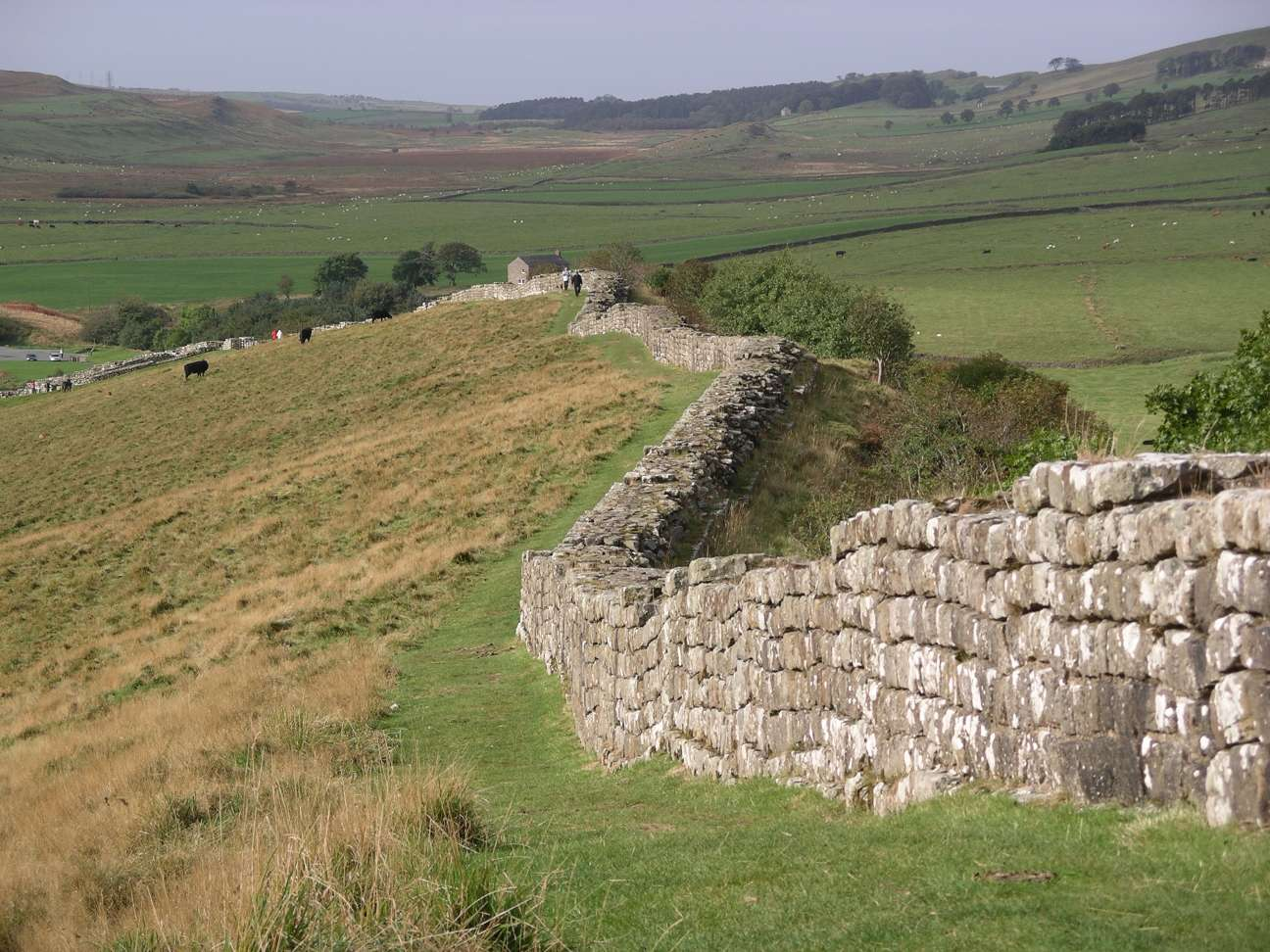
Hadrian's Wall

Outside Greenhead the Pennine Way passes Thirlwall Castle on Hadrian's Wall. For the next 11 miles (18 km) the route coincides with the Hadrian's Wall Path, following the wall closely past Once Brewed to Rapishaw Gap, 1 mile (1.6 km) west of the Housesteads Roman Fort.

From the wall the trail heads north through Wark Forest. Past the forest it follows field paths to Shitlington Crags and descends to the large village of Bellingham. More remote country follows, across Padon Hill and the edge of Redesdale Forest. The trail eventually reaches Redesdale at Blakehopeburnhaugh and Cottonshopeburnfoot, two neighbouring hamlets which compete for the longest name in England. The route then follows the River Rede upstream to the village of Byrness.

The last stage of the Pennine Way, across the Cheviot Hills from Byrness to Kirk Yetholm, is 27 miles (43 km) long, with no habitation en route. It is usually tackled in one long day, although there are two refuge huts (or bothies). The trail climbs steeply from the village, then heads north to cross the Scottish border near Ogre Hill. For the rest of the stage the path switches between England and Scotland, along a fence which marks the border itself. Back in England the trail passes the Roman fort at Chew Green, and briefly follows the Roman road of Dere Street. The path then follows the border ridge, passing the high point of Windy Gyle. At the west top of Cairn Hill (743 metres (2,438 ft)), from where the path leads to the summit of The Cheviot and back down, the path turns sharply northwest with the border fence, descending to a refuge hut before climbing The Schil at 601 metres (1,972 ft), above the College Valley. The path then descends into Scotland and enters the village of Kirk Yetholm. The path ends at the Border Hotel.

== Records ==
The record time for completion of the Pennine Way is 2 days, 10 hours, 4 minutes and 53 seconds, set by John Kelly on 15–17 May 2021. Kelly had previously held the record for just one week in July 2020 with a time of 2 days, 16 hours and 46 minutes, before this was broken by Damian Hall with a time of 2 days, 13 hours and 35 minutes. Before this, the record had been held for 31 years by Mike Hartley (time of 2 days, 17 hours and 20 minutes).

In 1984, after many attempts, Mike Cudahy became the first person to go under 3 days. He completed the route in 2 days, 21 hours, 54 minutes and 30 seconds. His journey is well-documented in his book, Wild Trails to Far Horizons.

The fastest women's time is 2 days, 22 hours and 47 minutes, set by Lucy Gossage in September 2026. The previous quickest was 3 days and 46 minutes, set by Anna Troup on 14–17 August 2021 and before that it was 3 days, 2 hours and 28 minutes, set by Sabrina Verjee on 12–15 September 2020.

The route of the Pennine Way is the basis of the Spine Race, which was inaugurated in 2012.

== Image gallery ==
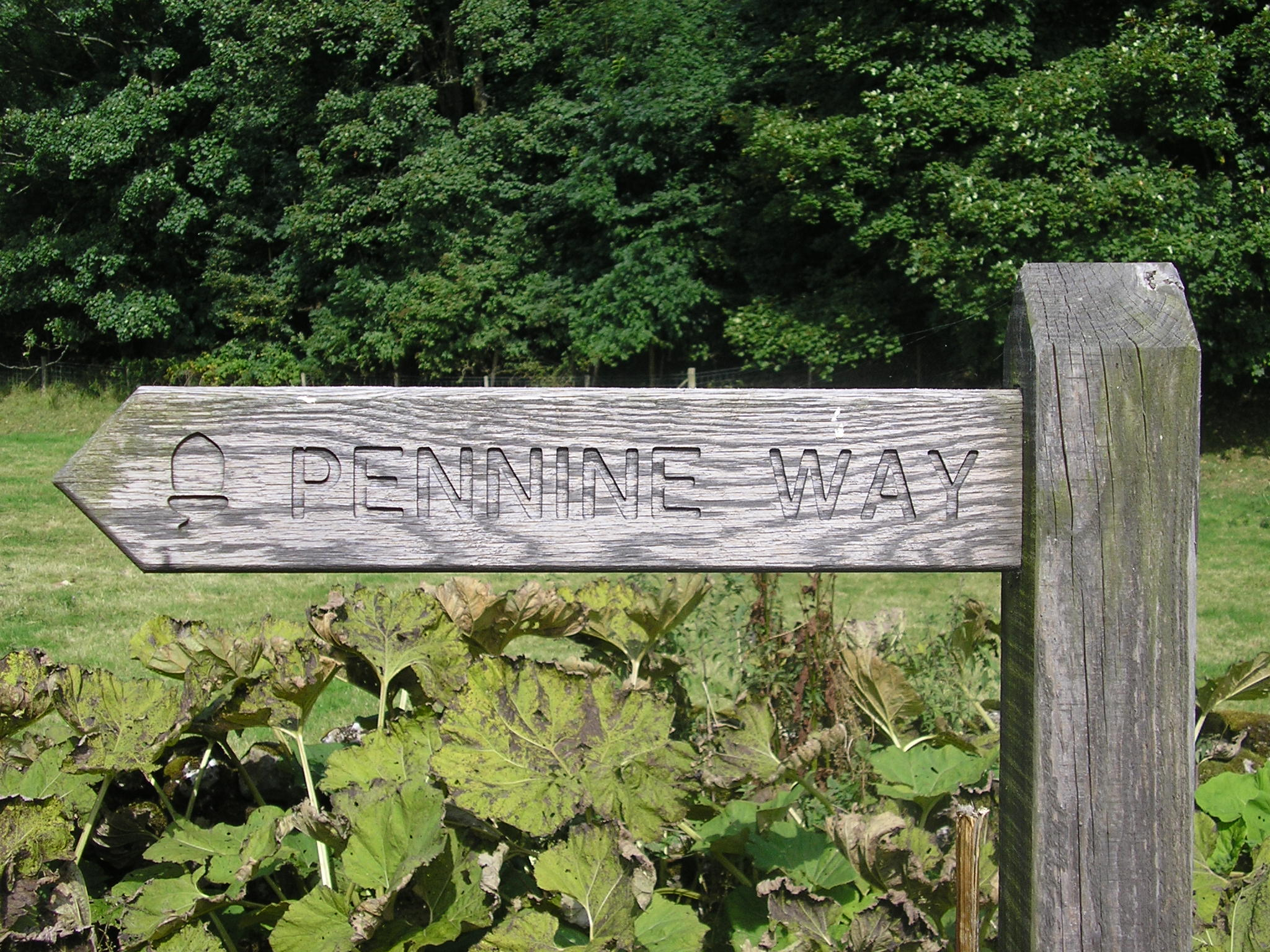
A waymark at Airton

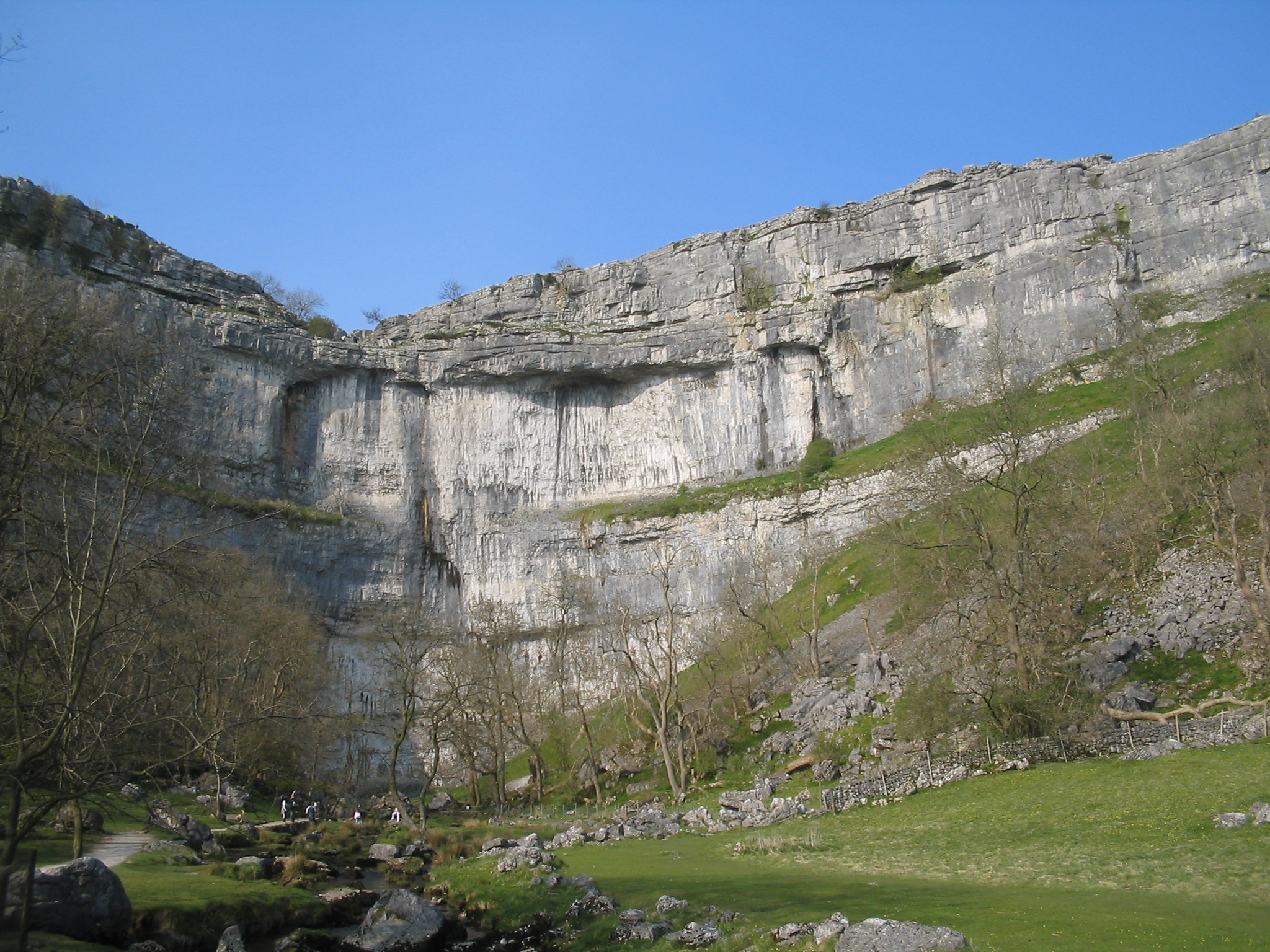
The limestone cliff at Malham Cove

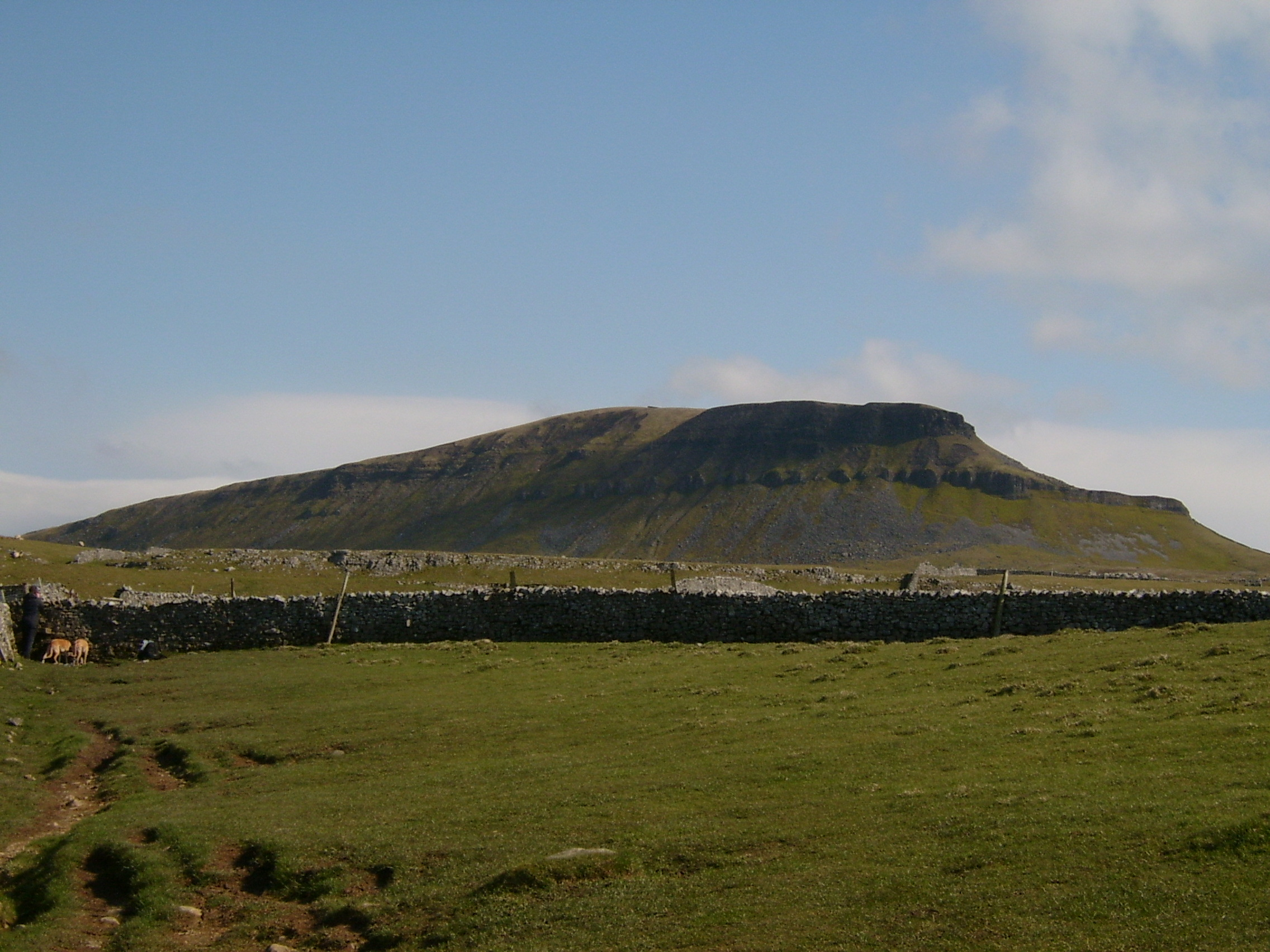
Pen-y-ghent

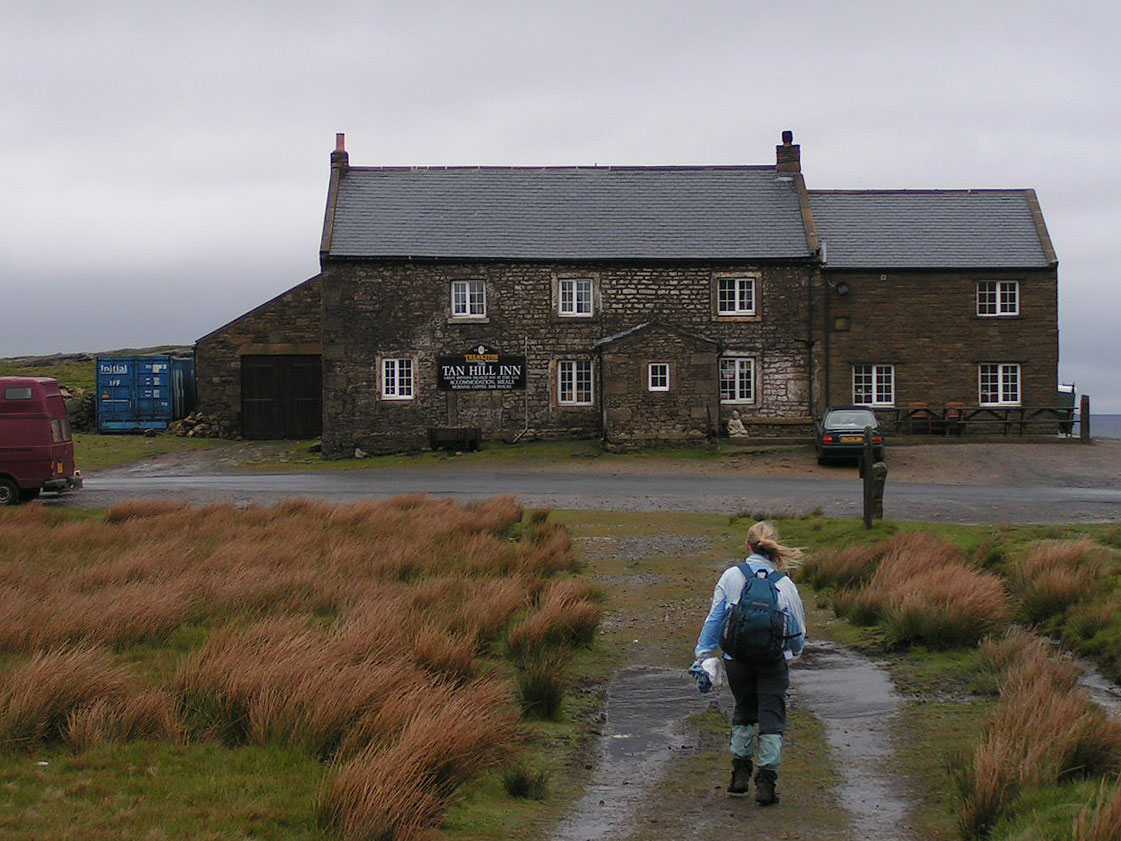
Tan Hill Inn

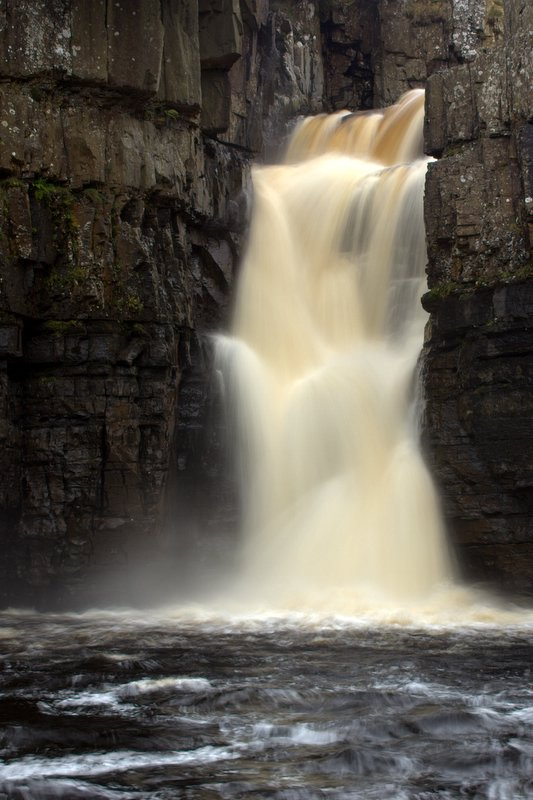
High Force

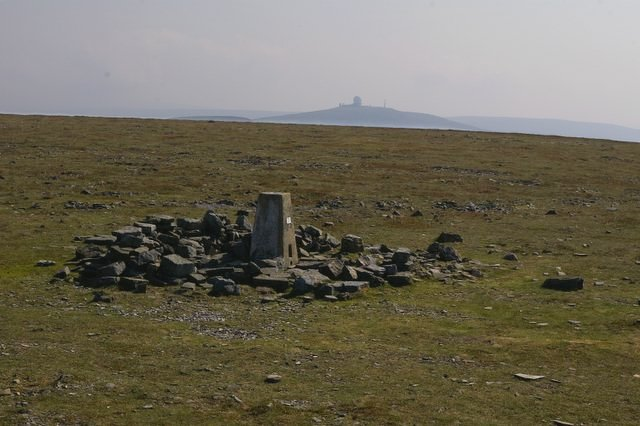
The Summit of Cross Fell, the highest point of the Pennines

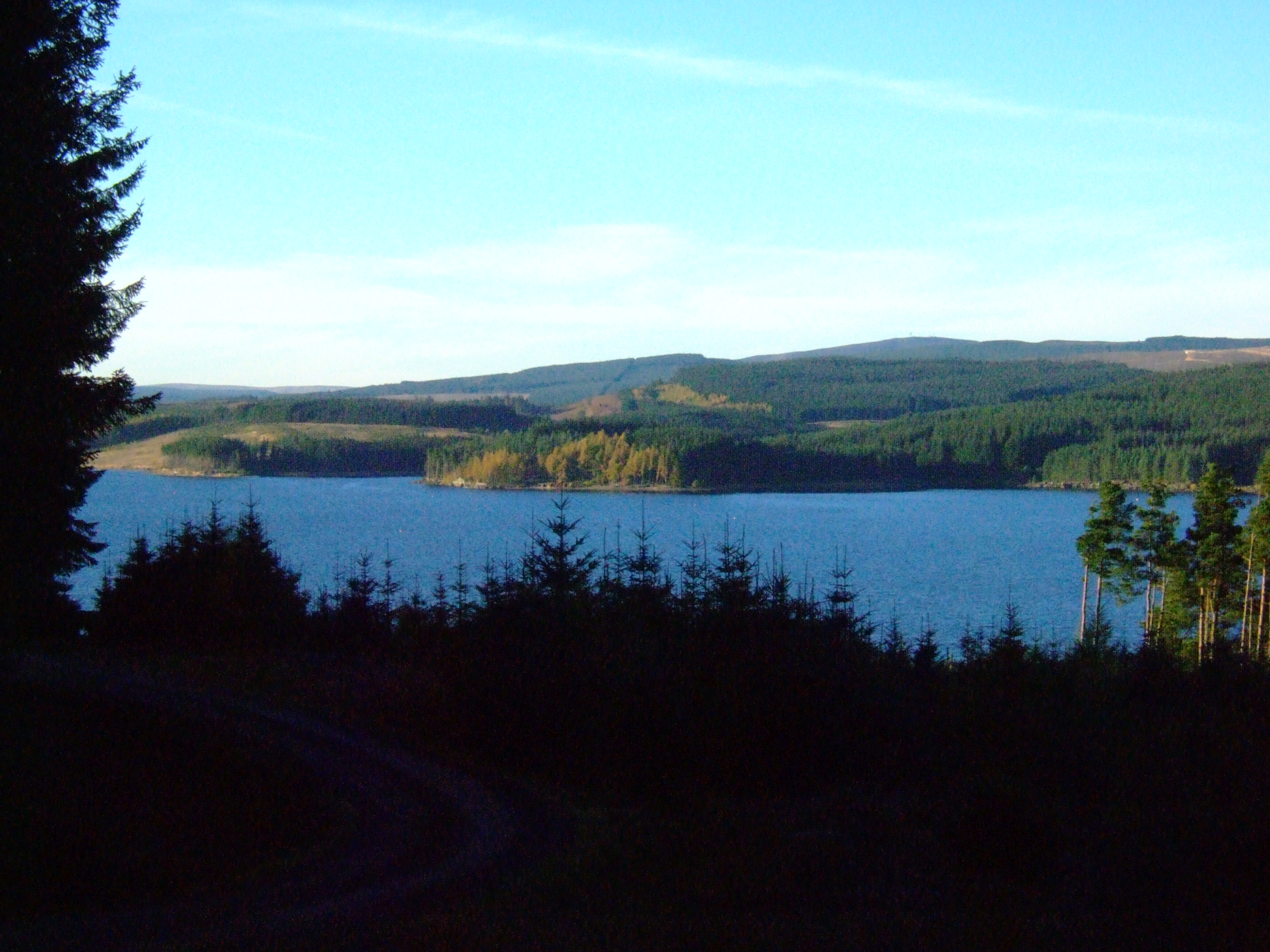
The Pennine Way passes through parts of the Kielder Forest

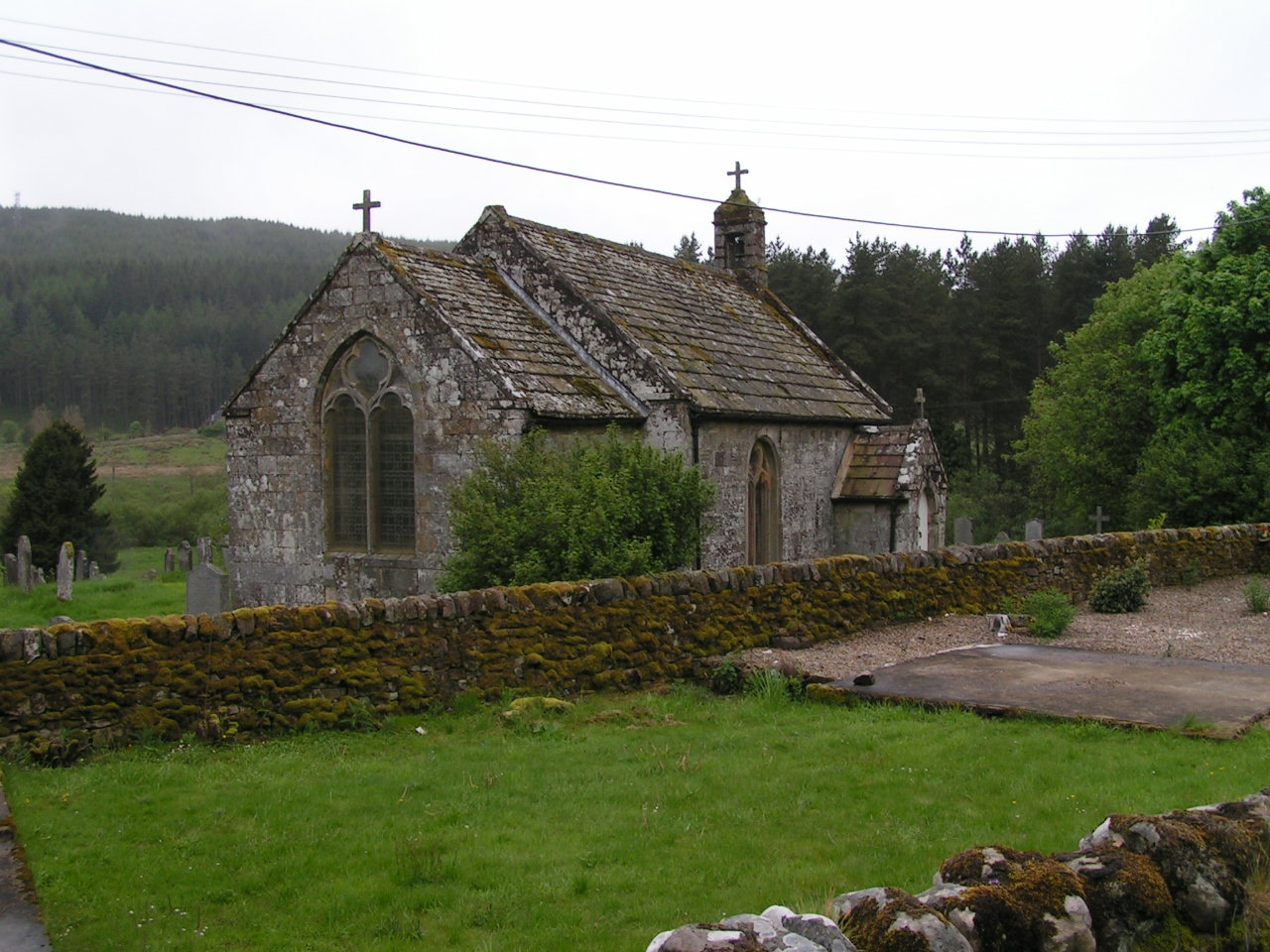
The Church at Byrness

== See also ==
- Long-distance footpaths in the United Kingdom
