= Damian Hall =

British ultrarunner, author and activist

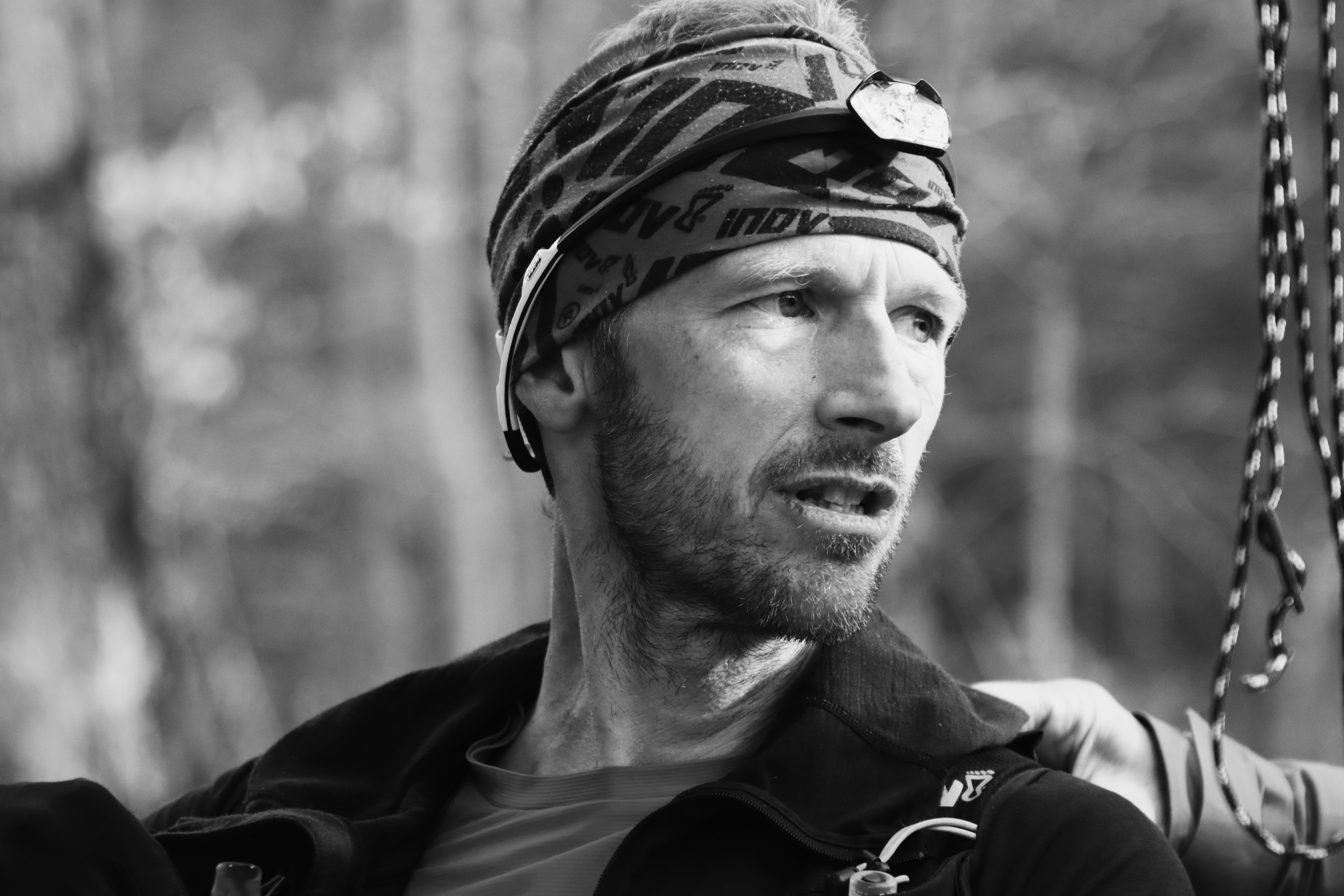
- Hall in 2023

Personal information
- Born: 1975 (age 50–51)
- Website: www.ultradamo.com

Sport
- Country: Great Britain
- Sport: Trail running

Damian Hall (born 1975) is a British ultrarunner, author and activist.

== Career ==
Hall grew up in the Cotswolds. Though he was competitive at cross-country at school, he did not start running as an adult until 2011, aged 36. The following year, he completed his first marathon (dressed as a toilet). In 2016, Hall represented Great Britain in the IAU Trail World Championships in Gerês, Portugal.

Hall has held the Fastest Known Times (FKTs) for a number of British long-distance trails, including the South West Coast Path, Cape Wrath Trail (with Beth Pascall), Paddy Buckley Round, Pennine Way, South Wales Traverse and Wainwright's Coast to Coast.

Hall won the 2019 Ultra Tour Monte Rosa and the 2023 Spine Race. He was 4th at the 2023 Tor des Géants and 5th at the 2018 Ultra-Trail du Mont-Blanc. He has attempted the Barkley Marathons twice, reaching the final loop on both occasions.

Various documentaries have been made about Hall. Wrath followed his 2018 run with Beth Pascall on the 230-mile (370 km) Cape Wrath Trail, self-supported and during winter. In 2019, Underdog was released, following Hall's attempts to break into the top ten of the prestigious 105-mile (169 km) Ultra-Trail du Mont-Blanc. In 2020, Totally FKT followed his battle with John Kelly to break the 268-mile (431 km) Pennine Way FKT.

Hall is vegan, a climate activist, and a founding member of The Green Runners. He is outspoken about sportswashing, unveiling protest banners at race finishes and pledging not to run races with high-carbon sponsors. He has plogged (picked up rubbish while running) during record attempts.

Hall has written for a large number of newspapers and magazines. As well as writing the walking guides Walking in the Cotswolds and Pennine Way, Hall has written books about running and FKTs with In It For The Long Run, and about running and climate with We Can't Run Away From This.
