= Nicky Spinks =

British long-distance runner

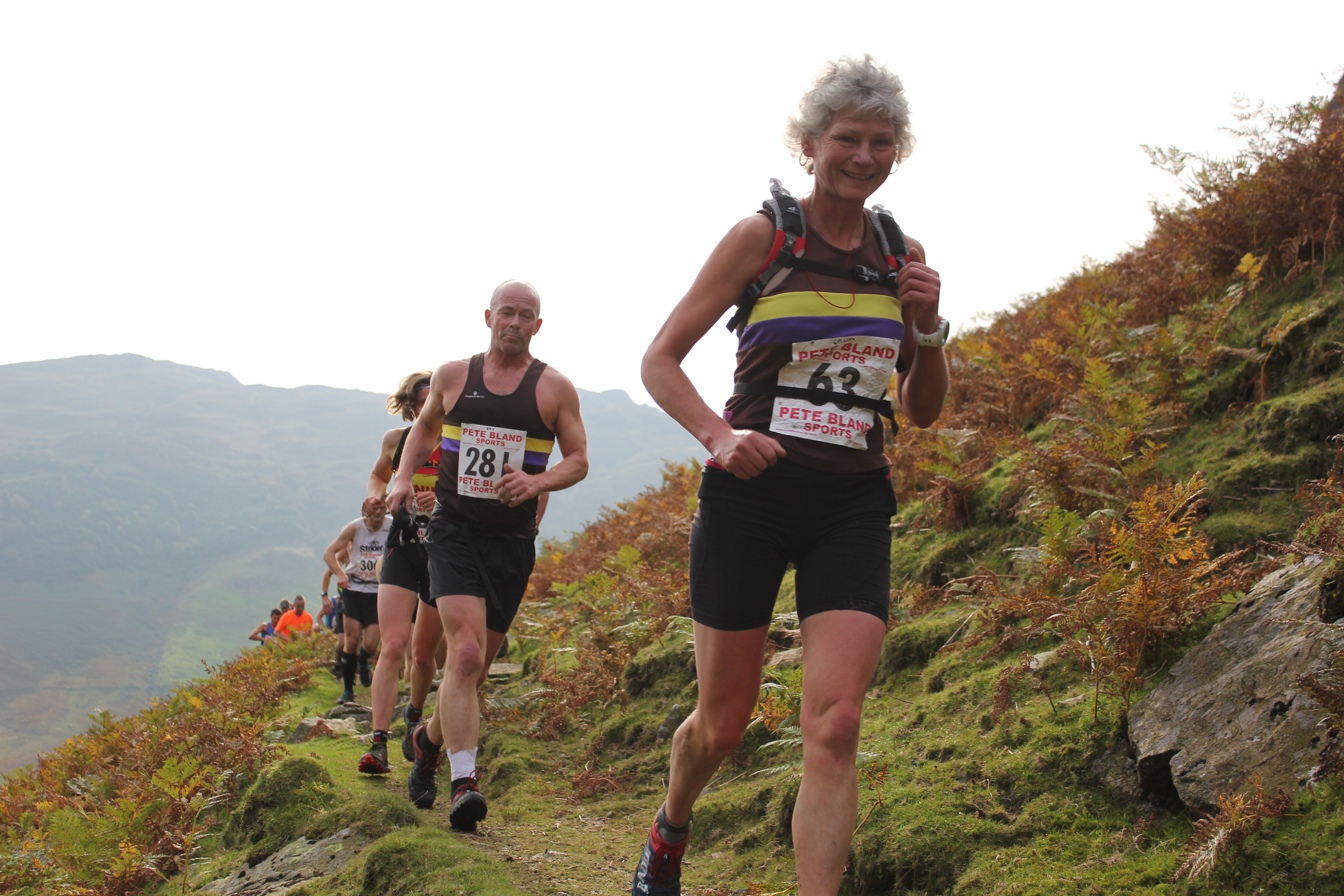
- Nicky Spinks at 2015 Langdale Horseshoe

Personal information
- Nationality: British
- Born: 22 April 1967 (age 59) London, England
- Occupation: Farmer
- Website: www.runbg.co.uk

Sport
- Country: United Kingdom
- Sport: Running
- Club: Dark Peak Fell Runners
- Updated on 27 November 2016

Nicola "Nicky" Spinks (born 22 April 1967) is a British long-distance runner, specialising in fell running, who set women's records for the major fell-running challenges the Ramsay Round, the Paddy Buckley Round and the Bob Graham Round.

She held the women's records for all three Rounds simultaneously until 2016, and was the holder of the overall record for the double Bob Graham Round until 2020, and the only person ever to complete doubles of the other two Rounds.

Born in London, she moved to the Peak District while still a child. She is now a farmer in Yorkshire.

== Early life ==
Nicky Spinks was born in London. She moved to Glossop in the Peak District while still a child.

== Running career ==
=== Early running career ===
Spinks began running competitively in 2001 in a 4-mile fell race.

=== UK 24-hour Rounds ===
Spinks first completed the Bob Graham Round in 2005. She subsequently set a woman's record of 18:12 in 2012 then lowered her own record to 18:06 in 2015. She set the women's record for the Paddy Buckley Round in 2013 at 19:02 and the Ramsay Round in 2014 at 19:39. She thus simultaneously held the women's fastest times for each of the three most famous 24-hour British mountain courses (which has never happened with the men's record) from 2014 until 2016, when Jasmin Paris broke Spinks's records for the individual rounds and set an overall best combined time of 50:10.

She was for some time the only person to have completed each challenge in under 20 hours. In 2015, aged 47, Spinks attempted to beat Chris Near's overall record for the combined times in the three challenges, when she attempted the Bob Graham in 2015. She needed to complete the circuit in 17:21 or faster, which she was unable to attain but still managed to set a new women's record of 18:06, despite sickness and injury.

On 15 May 2016, Spinks completed a double Bob Graham Round in 45 hours 30 minutes, one of only four people to do so and only two to do so within 48 hours, beating the previous record set by Roger Baumeister in 1979 by more than an hour.

In 2018 she completed a double Ramsey Round in 55:56 and in 2019 a double Paddy Buckley Round in 57:27. Whilst neither of these broke the 48-hour target, she is the only person ever to complete doubles of these Rounds. Thus, having previously simultaneously held the women's record for these three Rounds, she now simultaneously held the absolute records for doubles of the three Rounds.

=== Other running achievements ===
Ten years after starting running, in 2011, she set a new women's record of 64 for the number of Lakeland peaks climbed in 24 hours. The old record of 62 peaks was achieved by Anne Johnson in 1994. The record stood until 2020 when Carol Morgan added one new peak to make 65. The following year, 2021, Spinks regained the record by covering the same 65 peaks in a shorter time, before Fiona Pascall raised the record to 68 in 2022.

In April 2017, she ran the Joss Naylor Lakeland Challenge in 11:02, a new women's record.

Spinks has won the Fellsman four times and in 2013 she won the Borrowdale Fell Race.

Spinks was an entrant in the 2019 and 2023 edition of the Barkley Marathons.

She is sponsored by RaceKit and Inov-8.

== Personal life ==
In 2005, Spinks was diagnosed with breast cancer and had a mastectomy in 2012. She is a farmer in Yorkshire.
