= Carroll Morgan =

Carroll Morgan may refer to:

- Carroll Morgan (boxer)
- Carroll Morgan (computer scientist)

== See also ==
- Carol Morgan, Irish ultrarunner
