= Yiannis Tridimas =

Long-distance fell runner

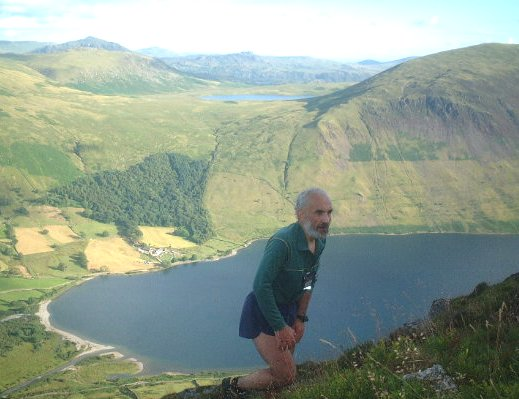
- Yiannis en route to Yewbarrow
- Born: 22 February 1945 (age 81); Andros, Greece
- Occupation: long-distance fell runner

Yiannis Tridimas (born 22 February 1945, in Andros, Greece) is a long-distance fell runner, noted as being the only 60-year-old to have completed an extended version of the Bob Graham Round, covering 60 peaks in under 24 hours. He completed the course on his third attempt, during the weekend of 6/7 August 2005, after his first attempt was curtailed by injury and the second by extreme hot weather. Yiannis is among a group of a few who have completed all three major 24-hour rounds in England, Scotland and Wales (Bob Graham Round, Ramsay and Paddy Buckley Round). In addition, he completed his own 24-hour round, the Meirionnydd round in Wales and has also completed the Cuillin round in the Isle of Skye. He has completed a solo run between Snowdon and Pumlumon in Wales, taking in all the major hills in between. Other ultra distance completions include the Joss Naylor challenge in Cumbria, the Leventon line in North Wales and the South Wales Traverse.

He was the first member of the Fell Runners Association to have been awarded the long distance trophy twice. He is currently a member of Bowland fellrunners club.

In 2003 Yiannis, along with teammate Ray Baines were winners in the veteran section of the Long score class, at the Karrimor International Mountain Marathon (KIMM). In 2007 Yiannis and Ray Baines completed the OMM (previously KIMM) elite class with an aggregate age of 121, the team with the highest aggregate to ever finish the elite class. In the photo below Yiannis is seen with Ranulph Fiennes at the start of the 2004 Lowe Alpine Mountain Marathon where they finished in tenth place in the Elite class.

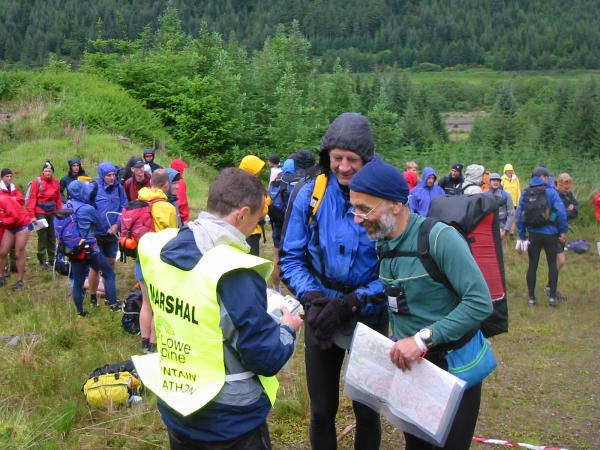
Yiannis with Ranulph Fiennes at the Lowe Alpine Mountain Marathon 2004

Yiannis, now a preeminent figure in the world of fell running has been a guest speaker at fell running award ceremonies and is mentioned in the 2007 Autobiography by Sir Ranulph Fiennes: Mad, Bad and Dangerous To Know.

== See also ==
- Bob Graham Round
