= Isle of Jura Fell Race =

Annual fell race on the Scottish island of Jura

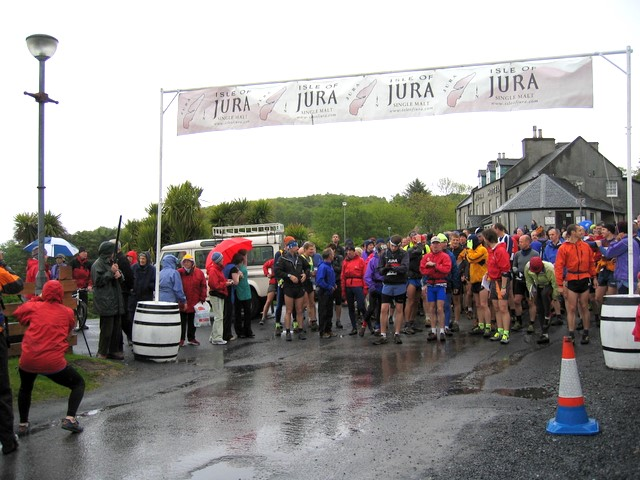
A wet start to the 2005 Isle of Jura Fell Race

The Isle of Jura Fell Race is an annual fell race held in May, starting and finishing at Craighouse on the Scottish island of Jura. The course loops west and north over several hills including the Paps of Jura. After the last climb to Corra Bheinn, a boggy descent takes the runners down to the tarmac coastal road which is followed for the final three miles to the finish. The route is approximately 17 miles (27 km) in length, with around 2,350 metres (7,710 ft) of ascent. As well as being known for the very difficult rocky and boggy terrain involved, the race is notable for its remoteness. The journey to the start of the race typically involves a ferry journey from the Scottish mainland to Islay, followed by another ferry to Jura and then several miles by bicycle, by bus or on foot to Craighouse.

Many runners stay on the island for several days around the time of the event, attending the cèilidh held in conjunction with the race and experiencing other attractions of Jura. A report of the 1997 race noted that three-quarters of the runners who started the race were running for English clubs.

British fell running champions Ian Holmes and Angela Mudge have both identified Jura as one of their favourite races.

Due to the striking contrast between the rough terrain of the majority of the course and the final section on the road, runners have in some cases changed from fell running shoes to road running shoes for the latter part in an attempt to run more efficiently on the tarmac. However, the action of changing shoes during the race has sometimes led to cramp.

== History ==
The inaugural race took place in 1973, when it was called the Bens of Jura Fell Race. The founder was George Broderick who, after recognising the potential for a tough fell race on the island during a visit there in 1970, returned the following year to carry out further investigation. It was intended to hold the first race in 1972, with the Glasgow and Strathclyde Officers' Training Corps having agreed to control the radio communications for the race. However, difficulty in securing suitable rescue cover for the day of the race led to postponement until 14 July 1973. The event was held again in both 1974 and 1975 but a low number of entries for the 1976 race, coupled with concerns over the dependability of the safety cover on the mountain summits, resulting in the race being cancelled.

There followed a hiatus in the event but some runners were keen for it to be re-established. Mike Davies (a winner of the Ben Nevis Race and the Three Peaks Race) felt that Jura was "the most ambitious fell race ever promoted". In May 1983 the race took place again, being then organised by Donald Booth with sponsorship from the local distillery. Booth continued as organiser until Andy and Ann Curtis took over in 1993. They coordinated the event until 2005 and were followed as organisers by Phil Hodgson and Mandy Goth for five years until Graham Arthur took on the race management.

Runners have often had navigational problems during the race but particularly poor visibility has occasionally seen even some of the checkpoint marshals unable to find their assigned locations which has compounded the confusion for the runners. This was reported to be the case in the 1975 race and again in the 1995 event which took place in severe conditions. In the latter year, only eighty-three of the 135 starters finished the race and the men's and women's winners were both Jura locals, with Duncan Richardson winning the men's race despite a significant detour from the optimal route.

In 1991 an alternative route was used for the first time due to the unfavourable conditions. The 2005 race also used the bad weather course which went around the Paps rather than over them.

The 2000 race was in jeopardy due to a proposed strike by Caledonian MacBrayne ferry workers but ultimately went ahead with little disruption.

Jura has been a counting race in the Scottish Hill Running Championships, including the 2003 and 2016 seasons.

The 2011 event was featured on BBC Scotland's programme The Adventure Show.

Runners completing the race in under four hours are awarded with an engraved whisky glass and those who have completed the race twenty-one times are presented with a George Broderick Plaque.

== Results ==
The men's course record is 2:58:09 set by Finlay Wild in 2022, beating his previous record set in 2017. Naomi Lang holds the women's record, with 3:38:02 set in 2026, beating the prior record set by Jasmin Paris in 2015.

Angela Mudge has the most wins, with seven between 2002 and 2012. Ian Holmes and Finlay Wild have the most victories amongst the men, with six each.

The winners have been as follows.

Year	Men	Time	Women	Time
1973	Bobby Shields	3:54:57		
1974	Brian Finlayson	3:29:22^{[Note A]}		
1975	Jim Smith	4:31:30		
1983	Andy Styan	3:24:37	Jeanne Neal	5:43:59
1984	Andy Styan	3:16:54	Ann Curtis	4:35:19
1985	Ray Aucott	3:18:36	Ann Curtis	4:32:35
1986	Del Davies	3:20:19	Winky O'Neale	4:18:20
1987	Billy Bland	3:19:06	Angela Brand-Barker	4:12:09
1988	Colin Donnelly	3:07:05	Angela Brand-Barker	3:50:22
1989	Colin Donnelly	3:11:59	Christine Menhennet	4:16:15
1990	Ian Ferguson	3:15:28	Stel Farrar	4:28:16
1991^{[Note B]}	Andy Curtis	3:59:46	Kathy Gott	6:04:14
1992	Andy Trigg	3:27:25	Tricia Calder	3:59:45
1993	Ian Holmes	3:26:29	Clare Kenny	4:25:20
1994	Mark Rigby	3:06:59	Helene Diamantides	3:53:56
1995	Duncan Richardson	4:26:04	Dorothy Dundas	5:29:21
1996	Ian Holmes	3:14:16	Yvonne Williams	4:55:31
1997	Mark Rigby	3:08:17	Nicola Davies	4:03:38
1998	Andy Trigg	3:45:41	Liz Cowell	4:56:54
1999	Robin Lawrence	3:38:02	Christine Creswell	4:21:20
2000	Mark Rigby	3:16:14	Jennifer Rae	4:15:38
2001	Cancelled due to foot-and-mouth outbreak			
2002	David Rodgers	3:19:00	Angela Mudge	3:49:50
2003	Nick Sharp	3:20:14	Angela Mudge	3:45:31
2004	Tim Lenton	3:36:25	Kate Jenkins	4:40:19
2005^{[Note B]}	Ian Holmes	2:56:03	Sue Mitchell	4:08:36
2006	Ian Holmes	3:31:44	Dawn Scott	4:45:41
2007	Ian Holmes	3:18:31	Angela Mudge	4:07:55
2008	Rob Jebb	3:07:49	Angela Mudge	3:40:33
2009	Ian Holmes	3:49:50	Angela Mudge	4:23:46
2010	Rob Jebb	3:28:36	Angela Mudge	3:59:11
2011	Es Tresidder	3:21:51	Sarah Ridgway	4:09:29
2012	Rob Jebb	3:17:39	Angela Mudge	3:55:35
2013	Hector Haines	3:18:29	Jasmin Paris	3:54:51
2014	Hector Haines	3:06:30	Jasmin Paris	3:53:52
2015	Finlay Wild	3:13:27	Jasmin Paris	3:38:43
2016	Finlay Wild	3:09:53	Jasmin Paris	3:41:00
2017	Finlay Wild	3:05:14	Jill Stephen	4:05:18
2018	Ted Ferguson	3:19:30	Jasmin Paris	3:49:22
2019	Tim Morgan	3:20:27	Jill Stephen	4:06:22
2020	Cancelled due to the COVID-19 pandemic			
2021	Cancelled due to the COVID-19 pandemic			
2022	Finlay Wild	2:58:09	Jasmin Paris	4:10:35
2023	Finlay Wild	3:07:07	Eleanor Johnstone	4:18:43
2024	Jack Wright	3:18:58	Catriona Graves	4:01:08
2025	Finlay Wild	3:07:16	Alexandra Whitaker	4:10:42
2026	Luke Fisher	3:13:38	Naomi Lang	3:38:02

^{Note A} There is a discrepancy of ten minutes in times reported for Finlayson, with 3:39:22 given by the Jura Fell Race website and The Times of 30 May 1983, but 3:29:22 in Stud Marks on the Summits, 178, The Fell Runner, 1974, 32, and The Fellrunner Magazine, Jun 2005, 17.

^{Note B} Bad weather course.
