= Dragon's Back Race =

Six-day mountain ultramarathon in Wales

- Date: September
- Location: Wales
- Event type: Multi-day mountain ultramarathon
- Distance: 380 km (240 mi)
- Established: September 1992; 34 years ago
- Organizer: Ultra X (ultra-x.co)
- Website: www.dragonsbackrace.com

The Dragon's Back Race (Welsh: Ras Cefn y Ddraig) is a six-day ultramarathon through the mountains of Wales. The race runs approximately 380 km (240 mi) from Conwy Castle in North Wales to Cardiff Castle in South Wales and includes around 16,400 m (53,800 ft) of ascent.

The race was first held in September 1992 and was revived in September 2012 after a twenty-year absence. It was originally contested over five days, before being extended to six days in 2021. Since April 2026, the race has been organised by Ultra X, following its acquisition from the administrators of Ourea Events.

== History ==
The inaugural Dragon's Back Race was held in September 1992. The event followed the mountainous spine of Wales and was completed over five days. After a twenty-year absence, it was revived in 2012 by Ourea Events.

The five-day race covered approximately 186 miles (299 km), compared with approximately 236 miles (380 km) following its later extension.

In August 2020, Ourea Events announced that the 2021 edition would be extended from five days to six. The additional stage extended the race south from its previous finish at Llandeilo to Cardiff Castle.

=== Ourea Events administration and Ultra X acquisition ===
Ourea Events ceased trading in March 2026. Ourea Events Limited and Skyline Trail Races Limited subsequently entered administration, with the administrators assessing options for the future operation of the companies' events, including the Dragon's Back Race.

On 22 April 2026, endurance-event organiser Ultra X announced that it had acquired the Dragon's Back Race and the Northern Traverse from the administrators. The acquisition allowed the 2026 Dragon's Back Race to proceed on its scheduled dates, with existing entries honoured. Ultra X stated that the Dragon's Back Race would continue to operate as a separate event brand.

== Winners ==
The winners have been as follows.

Year	Men	Time	Women	Time	Days	Pairs	Time
1992	John Redmayne	42:59:00	–	–	5	Helene Diamantides and Martin Stone	38:38:00
2012	Steve Birkinshaw	43:25:30	Helene Whitaker	49:10:05	5		
2015	Jim Mann	40:08:03	Jasmin Paris	41:45:34	5		
2017	Marcus Scotney	37:58:37	Carol Morgan	48:41:47	5		
2019	Galen Reynolds	37:48:06	Lisa Watson	44:33:23	5		
2021	Simon Roberts	45:42:11	Katie Mills	61:12:54	6		
2022	James Nobles	50:40:23	Lisa Watson	53:46:22	6		
2023	Hugh Chatfield	47:38:44	Robyn Cassidy	54:25:05	6		
2024	Max King	45:39:19	Jo Meek	63:30:11	6		

== Course ==
The full course covers approximately 380 km (240 mi) over six days, with around 16,400 m (53,800 ft) of ascent.

Day	Distance	Vertical gain	Details
1	50 kilometres (31 mi)	4,100 metres (13,500 ft)	From Conwy Castle through the Carneddau, Tryfan, the Glyderau, the Crib Goch ridge and the Snowdon Horseshoe, finishing at Nant Gwynant.
2	60 kilometres (37 mi)	3,200 metres (10,500 ft)	Through Cnicht, the Moelwynion and the Rhinogydd.
3	66 kilometres (41 mi)	2,900 metres (9,500 ft)	Through Dolgellau, over Cadair Idris and into the Cambrian Mountains. The route passes through Machynlleth before ascending Pen Pumlumon Fawr, the highest point in the Cambrian Mountains at 752 metres (2,467 ft).
4	70 kilometres (43 mi)	1,900 metres (6,200 ft)	Through the Elan Valley before finishing at Rhandirmwyn.
5	72 kilometres (45 mi)	3,200 metres (10,500 ft)	Through the Brecon Beacons, including Pen y Fan, before finishing at Talybont-on-Usk.
6	65 kilometres (40 mi)	1,300 metres (4,300 ft)	Through the South Wales valleys to Merthyr Tydfil, followed by the Taff Trail and River Taff to Cardiff Castle.

== Sponsorship ==
The race was sponsored by Berghaus in 2015, 2017 and 2019, and by Montane in 2021, 2022 and 2023.
