= Steve Birkinshaw =

English fell runner and hydrologist

Stephen Birkinshaw (born 1968) is an English fell runner and hydrologist. From 21 June 2014 until 20 June 2019 he held the record for the fastest run round the 214 Wainwright summits, at 6 days 13 hours.

== Fell running ==
Birkinshaw was introduced to orienteering by his family as a child. He competed in many long-distance fell running events, and completed the Bob Graham Round in 2005 in a time of 17 hours 9 minutes. He won the Original Mountain Marathon, formerly known as the Karrimoor International Mountain Marathon, in 1997, 1998, 1999, 2002, 2003, 2005 and 2009.

In 1987 Joss Naylor set a record for a run around all 214 Wainwrights, completing this in 7 days 1 hour 25 minutes, beating Alan Heaton's 1985 time of 9 days 16 hours 42 minutes.

Birkinshaw broke this record on 21 June 2014 in a time of 6 days 12 hours 58 minutes. In doing so he raised over £22,000 for two multiple sclerosis charities, the MS Society and the Samson Centre for MS in Guildford, because his sister has MS. He described the run in his book There is No Map in Hell, including full details of his route and timings, as well as the complex logistics of support runners, road support, and general planning involved in the operation, and the pain and psychological challenges he endured. The record was broken again when Paul Tierney completed the run in a time of 6 days 6 hours and 4 minutes, from 8am on 14 June to 2:04pm on 20 June 2019.

After the Wainwrights run, Birkinshaw suffered health problems diagnosed as chronic fatigue syndrome, saying in an article in Fell Runner in 2017 that he "is not sure if he is fully recovered. 'Sometimes I have days when I feel completely normal. Other days I have some "brain fog" but it is nowhere near as bad as it was. ... I have done some longer harder runs and sometimes I have felt OK and sometimes I have really struggled. Basically I am happy with where I am. I might recover fully and be able to push it as hard and be as fast as before, but I might never get there. However, I can live a normal life and go out running every day.' " In July 2018 he accompanied Kilian Jornet on a section of his record-breaking Bob Graham Round (Jornet completed in 12 hours 52 minutes, an hour below the previous record) and reported that "although I have recovered from my Wainwrights round – which is now four years ago – I am still five to ten per cent slower than I was then."

== Academic career ==
Birkinshaw gained a Ph.D. in 1997, studying nitrate pollution modelling. He works as a research hydrologist at Newcastle University, in the area of "physically based hydrological modelling of river basins".

== Selected publications ==
- Birkinshaw, Steve (2017). There is No Map in Hell: The Record-Breaking Run Across the Lake District Fells. Vertebrate Publishing. ISBN 978-1910240946.
