= Moot Hall, Keswick =

Municipal building in Keswick, Cumbria, England

The Moot Hall
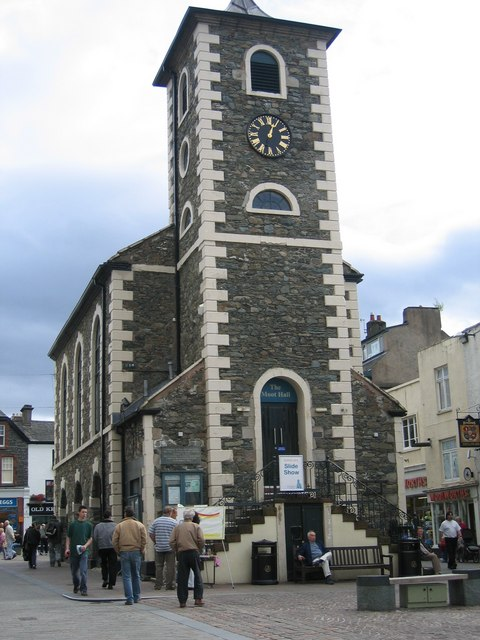
- The Moot Hall

- Location in Allerdale, Cumbria Location in the Lake District National Park
- 54°36′2″N 3°8′14″W
- Location: Keswick

History
- Built: 1813

Listed Building – Grade II*
- Designated: 2 October 1951
- Reference no.: 1137345

The Moot Hall is a prominent historic building situated at the southern end of Main Street in Keswick, Cumbria, England. It is Grade II* listed.

== History ==
The hall has its origins in a medieval courthouse, used by the manor of Castlerigg and Derwentwater, which was in the ownership of the Radclyffe family by the 16th century. Richard Dudley, of Yanwath, acting as the local overseer on behalf of the "Company of Mines Royal", took a lease on the building from Lady Catherine Radclyffe of Derwentwater, the wife of Sir George Radclyffe of Derwentwater (1517-1579), in 1570. Dudley converted it into a storehouse for "weighing and keeping copper". He wrote to the Secretary of State, Sir William Cecil, in October 1570 to report that the works were ongoing and it appears that those works, which involved "pulling down of the old house", were completed the following year.

The upper floor continued to be used as the manorial courtroom while the ground floor was used to store the copper from the mines; once demand for copper reduced, the ground floor was used as a market hall. After the building fell into a dilapidated condition, it was thought to have been rebuilt with stones from the remains of the Radclyffe mansion on Lord's Island in 1695. The freehold ownership of the building passed to the James Radclyffe, 3rd Earl of Derwentwater on the death of his father in 1705; however after James Radclyffe was executed for his involvement in the Jacobite rising of 1715, his property was seized and passed to the trustees of Greenwich Hospital.

The current structure, built of lime-washed stone and slate walling, was commissioned by the trustees of Greenwich Hospital in 1813. It was designed with a square tower on the north end with a round-arched doorway and a double flight of steps inside and with what the Keswick Tourist Information Board describes as an "unusual one-handed clock" at the top. The clock, attributed to Richard Young of Newcastle, is dated 1814; it strikes the hours on a bell which (along with the weather vane on the roof) is said to have come from Lord's Island on Derwentwater.

The Marshall family acquired the building from the trustees of Greenwich Hospital in 1832. It became home to the Keswick Museum of Local and Natural History, a creation of the Keswick Literary and Scientific Society, in 1873. The museum collection included a three-dimensional model of the Lake District, measuring 12 feet by 9 feet, made by Joseph and James Flintoft in 1837. The building was used for civic assemblies and meetings of the Keswick Urban District Council after it was formed in 1894: the local council acquired the building from the Marshall family in 1896, and the museum moved out to purpose-built facilities in Station Road in 1897.

The urban district council moved its meetings and offices to a converted former bank at 50 Main Street in 1926. The town hall was then leased to the British Legion to use as a club. In the late 1970s a Tourist Information Centre was established on the ground floor, while an art gallery was created on the floor above.

As a central landmark in Keswick, the Moot Hall is used as the official start and/or finish point for various challenge events including the Bob Graham Round and runs visiting all the 214 Wainwrights. The second stage of the Tour de France is due to start from the Moot Hall in July 2027.

In January 2026, the Lake District National Park Authority closed its tourist information office, which previously occupied the ground floor of the building. As of May 2026, the building is unused, but is expected to become a cafe.

== Sources ==
- Dalton, Nick (28 August 2012). Frommer's England and the Best of Wales. John Wiley & Sons. ISBN 978-1-118-33371-6.
- Otley, Jonathan (1819). Account of the Floating Island in Derwent Lake, Keswick. Vol. 3. Manchester Literary and Philosophical Society.
