= Paul Tierney (hurler) =

Irish hurler and runner

Personal information
- Native name: Pól Ó Tiarnaigh (Irish)
- Born: 1982 (age 43–44) Blackrock, Cork, Ireland
- Height: 6 ft 1 in (185 cm)

Sport
- Sport: Hurling
- Position: Midfield
Club
- Years: Club
- 2000-2005: Blackrock
Club titles
- Cork titles: 2
College
- Years: College
- Cork Institute of Technology
College titles
- Fitzgibbon titles: 0
Inter-county
Years	County	Apps (scores)
2003-2004	Cork	1 (0-00)
Inter-county titles
- Munster titles: 1
- All-Irelands: 1
- NHL: 0
- All Stars: 0

Paul Tierney (born 1982) is an Irish sportsperson and fell runner. He played hurling with his local club Blackrock and was a member of the Cork senior inter-county team from 2003 until 2004.

== Playing career ==
Tierney attended St Finbarr's College and lined out in the various hurling competitions. He won a Dr O'Callaghan Cup medal in 2000, after lining out in the 0–13 to 0–07 defeat of St Colman's College in the final. Tierney later played with Cork Institute of Technology in the Fitzgibbon Cup.

At club level, Tierney first played for Blackrock at juvenile and underage levels, before progressing to the senior team. He won consecutive Cork SHC medals in 2001 and 2002, following respective defeats of Imokilly and Newtownshandrum.

Tierney first appeared on the inter-county scene for Cork as a member of the minor team. He won a Munster MHC medal before later lining out in the defeat by Galway in the 2000 All-Ireland MHC final. He later lined out with the under-21 team. Tierney was drafted onto the senior team and won a Munster SHC medal in his first season. He was an unused substitute when Cork beat Kilkenny by 0–17 to 0–09 in the 2004 All-Ireland final. Tierney retired from hurling in 2005, at the age of 23.

== Post-playing career ==
In 2015, Tierney won the Lakeland 100, a 100-mile ultramarathon through trails in the Lake District National Park; he completed the race in 20 hours 42 minutes. He is now a running coach based in Cumbria specialising in natural running techniques.

Tierney has three times finished the 330 km Tor des Géants in the Aosta Valley in less than 100 hours (99:09 in 2017, 94:39 in 2018 and 88:05 in 2021).

On 20 June 2019, Tierney broke the record for running the 214 Wainwright summits, completing in 6 days 6 hours 4 minutes and beating Steve Birkinshaw's previous record.

== Honours ==
St Finbarr's College

- Dr O'Callaghan Cup: 2000

Blackrock

- Cork Senior Hurling Championship: 2001, 2002

Cork

- All-Ireland Senior Hurling Championship: 2004
- Munster Senior Hurling Championship: 2004
- Munster Minor Hurling Championship: 2000
