= Carol Morgan =

Irish ultrarunner

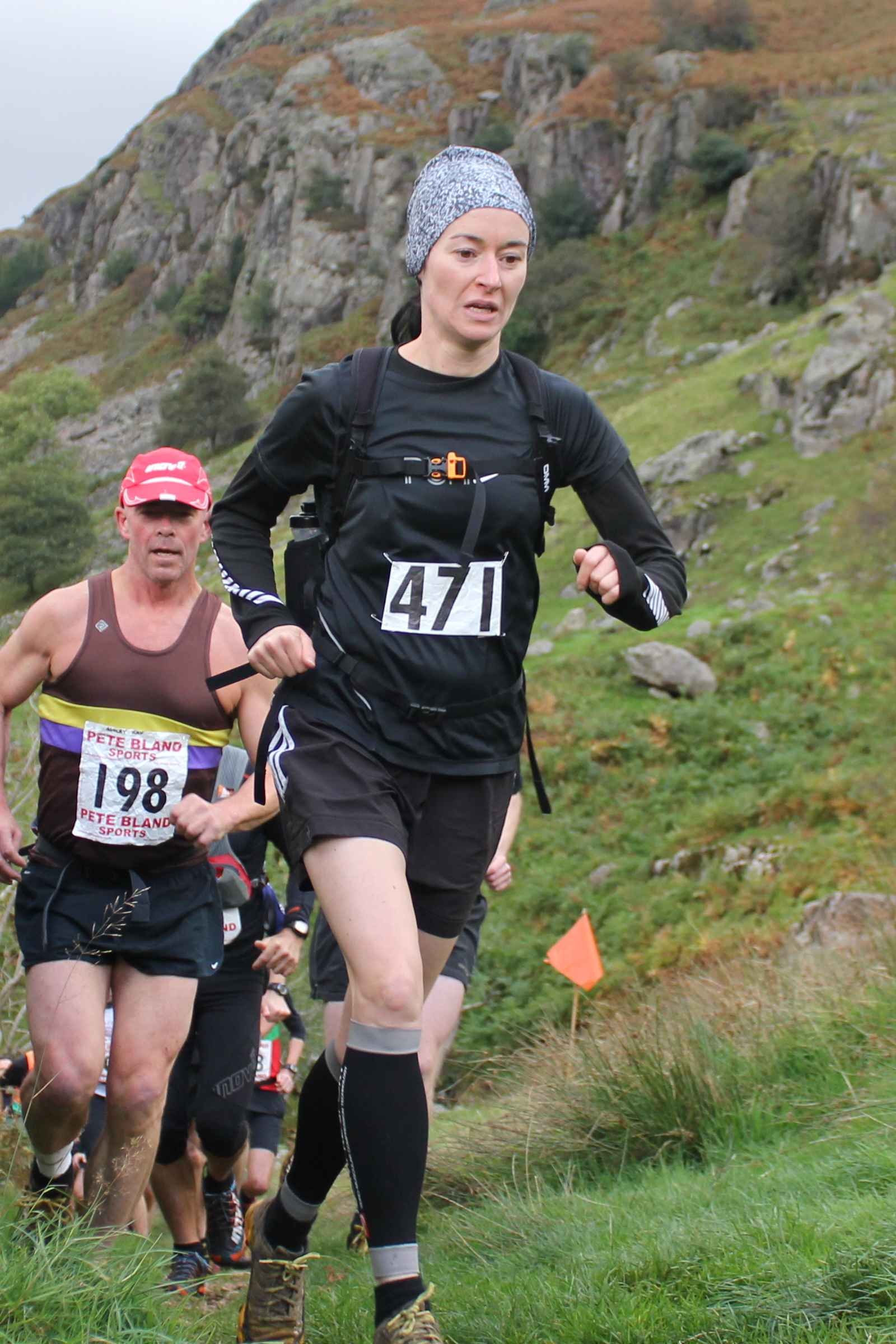
- Carol Morgan at 2013 Langdale Horseshoe

Personal information
- Nationality: Irish
- Born: 1973 (age 52–53) Dublin, Ireland

Sport
- Country: Ireland
- Sport: Athletics
- Events: Fell running, Mountain running, Ultramarathon
- Club: Nidd Valley
- Updated on 16 April 2018

Carol Morgan (born 1973) is an Irish ultrarunner, who specialises in non-stop mountain ultramarathons 100 km and longer, often in challenging conditions with significant ascents / descents. Born in Dublin in 1973, where she trained as a nurse, she is an advanced practitioner in emergency medicine. Morgan holds the course record for endurance ultra event, the Kerry Way Ultra.

== Early running years ==
Morgan started running in her thirties. and has been running with Nidd Valley Running Club in Harrogate, Yorkshire, with whom she still regularly competes, since at least 2010, gradually adding longer and longer distances to her repertoire.

== Competing in road races ==
2007–2012 saw Morgan compete in the Connemarathon road race in Ireland in April. In 2007 she placed tenth in the marathon while incorrectly listed as from the United Kingdom. From 2009–2012 she placed either first or second in the Connemarathon ultramarathon in conditions that varied from unseasonally hot sunshine to pelting rain. 2010 was particularly difficult with less than 5 minutes separated first and second place with both athletes experiencing the last 2 mile incline, known as the 'hell of the west' because it affords competitors a clear view of the finish long before you reach it, together.

Since 2012 Morgan has limited participation in long distance road running saying she prefers the beauty of the mountains and bogs. She has chosen increasingly technical mountain events that require navigational knowledge and mandatory safety kits, and courses that include significant ascents / descents.

== Competing in the mountains ==
In 2015 Morgan raced in France's CCC. In 2016 she placed 20th Ultra-Trail du Mont-Blanc in warm weather conditions on a course which requires participants to demonstrate technical skills by accumulating points from a list of qualifying races. She was 11th in Spain's Transgrancanaria the same year.

2017 brought the biannual Welsh Dragon's Back race which features a chasing start on the fifth and final day, and saw Morgan facing into the day with 15 minutes between the top three. Despite finishing well off the pace in 2015, she prevailed in 2017.

In 2018 Morgan won the Glendalough Clover Ultra which weaves its way around the Wicklow Way despite successfully defending her 2018 Spine Race title just a few weeks previously. Glendalough Clover Ultra was a qualifying event for the Irish trail team in 2018 and Morgan was selected to represent Ireland in the 2018 IAU Trail World Championships.

== Records ==
In 2017 Morgan reduced the women's record for Britain's 268 miles (431 km) Spine Race by 43 hours to 109 hours 54 minutes. Conditions in 2017 were relatively mild and boggy, and she finished 44 hours ahead of the second woman.

In 2018 she successfully defended her Spine Race title winning by a margin of 10 hours in conditions so severe the non-stop race was paused for 12 hours (but not the race clock) due to heavy winds and snow. Amongst the other challenges of winter in the Cheviots the 2018 runners had to contend with frozen water bottles. While conditions varied for competitors over the course of the 4+ days, in addition to eating snow, Morgan had to contend with "50 mph winds with a chill factor of minus 16°C, snow drifts up to [her] belly button". Her record in the Spine Race was beaten in 2019 by Jasmin Paris who surpassed Morgan's record by 26 hours 41 minutes.

At home in Ireland she created a new record in the non-stop Kerry Way Ultra in 2017, covering the 200 km in 27 Hours and 58 minutes, ranking fourth overall. The race, which covers the Kerry Way, took place during a code orange weather warning (heavy rainfall) and was awarded four points by the Ultra-Trail du Mont-Blanc (UTMB) as a qualifying race.

In August 2020, Morgan set a new women's Lake District 24-hour record. Starting and finishing in Braithwaite, she covered sixty-five peaks in a time of 23:57.

== Achievements ==
Event	Position	Overall Position	Distance / Length	Year
Cape Wrath Ultra	1	12	400 km	2018
Fellsman 2018	2	20	98 km	2018
Kielder Ultra 100k	1	5	100 km	2018
Glendalough Clover Ultra	1	16	80 km	2018
Spine Race 2018	1	8	431 km	2018
Spine Race 2017	1	6 (Joint)	431 km	2017
Dragon's Back 2017	1	9	315 km	2017
Kerry Way Ultra, 2017	1	4	–	2017
Ultra-Trail du Mont Blanc 2016	20	–	166 km	2016
Transgrancanaria 2016	11	–	125 km	2016
Connemarathon 2007	10	128	42.2 km	2007
Lakeland 100 2015	1	12	100 km	2015
Dragon's Back 2015	8	30	315 km	2015
Fellsman 2014	1	22	98 km	2014
Fellsman 2015	3	36	98 km	2015
Fellsman 2013	2	44	98 km	2013
Lakeland 100 2014	4	–	100 km	2014
Connemarathon 2012	1	22	63.3 km	2012
Connemarathon 2011	1	15	63.3 km	2011
Connemarathon 2010	2	30	63.3 km	2010
Connemarathon 2009	2	24	63.3 km	2009
Highland Fling Race 2009	14	–	85.3 km	2009
