= Lord's Island =

Island in Derwent Water, Cumbria, England

Coordinates: 54°35′13″N 3°8′13″W

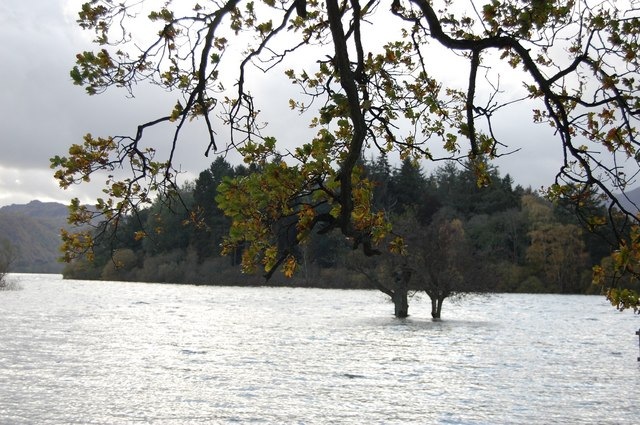

Lord's Island, which is one of the seven islands on Derwent Water in Keswick, Cumbria, England, got its name from the Earls of Derwentwater who used to live here. Not only was there a fine house on this island but it also had a drawbridge which was used to cross to the mainland.

The house, which was built in c.1450, gradually fell into a state of disrepair when the Earls moved away in c.1623. The stone from this dilapidated house was moved into Keswick and used to build the Moot Hall in 1695.

The last Earl, James Radclyffe, only managed to visit the area once, as having raised an army he decided to side with the Jacobites in 1714. He was, however, defeated at the Battle of Preston and beheaded in 1716.

== Sources ==
- Otley, Jonathan (1819). Account of the Floating Island in Derwent Lake, Keswick. Vol. 3. Manchester Literary and Philosophical Society.
