= Fellsman =

Walk and fell race in the Yorkshire Dales

- Location: Yorkshire Dales
- Event type: Ultrarun / Trailrun / Hike
- Distance: 60 miles (97 km)
- Established: 1962
- Course records: 10:06
- Website: www.fellsman.org.uk

The Fellsman is an annual-organised walk and fell race of about sixty miles in the Yorkshire Dales from Ingleton to Threshfield.

== History ==
The event was devised by Don Thompson and the Brighouse District (Brigantes) Rover Crew and the first hike was held in 1962, with the route then running in the opposite direction from the present one. The organisation was later taken on by the Keighley Scout Service Team. The Team has since changed its name to Keighley Scout Service Network.

== Route ==
The route includes Ingleborough, Whernside, Gragareth, Great Coum, Dent, Blea Moor, Great Knoutberry, Snaizeholme, Dodd Fell, Fleet Moss, Middle Tongue, Cray, Buckden Pike, Great Whernside before finishing in Threshfield. During the course of the race, participants will climb over 11,000 feet (3,400 m) and will cover some very testing terrain, some of which is off waymarked paths so navigational skills and experience with a map and compass are a necessity. Much of the course is on private land with secured access from the land-owners for the race period only.

== Results ==
The winners of the event have been as follows.

Year	Men	Time	Women	Time
1962	David Howe and Martin Roulson	23:20	--	--
1963	R. Whitaker and M. Allport	18:52	--	--
1964	George Barrow and George Brass	15:30	--	--
1965	Alan Heaton	15:28	--	--
1966	Alan Heaton	15:09	--	--
1967	Steve Harwood	14:42	--	--
1968	Alan Heaton	12:53	Hazel Costello	21:28
1969	Alan Heaton	13:52	Millie Black	23:22
1970	Ted Dance	17:43	Janet Massey	25:34
1971	Alan Heaton	13:32	Janet Massey	20:45
1972	Phil Puckrin	15:51	Susan Hargreaves	22:37
1973	Alan Heaton	16:17	Brenda Sedgwick	21:44
1974	Alan Heaton	15:17	Carol Stather	22:00
1975	Alan Heaton and Peter Hartley	14:35	Janet Sutcliffe	22:01
1976	Alan Heaton	14:59	Janet Sutcliffe	21:13
1977	Mike Walford	13:27	Ann Sayer	18:34
1978	Alan Heaton and Mike Walford	13:27	Jean Dawes	17:35
1979	Martin Hudson and Doug Calder	12:17	Jean Dawes and Anne-Marie Grindley	17:44
1980	Antony Richardson	11:44	Anne-Marie Grindley	17:57
1981	Peter Jebb	12:08	Anne-Marie Grindley	17:01
1982	Jeff Coulson	11:56	Anne-Marie Grindley	17:17
1983	Martin Hudson	11:04	Anne-Marie Grindley	14:48
1984	Michael Hartley	11:45	Anne-Marie Grindley	17:11
1985	Alan Jones and Stanley Bradshaw	11:45	Linda Lord and Vanessa Brindle	17:35
1986	S. Bradshaw	12:50	Inken Blunk	17:48
1987	Stanley Bradshaw, Harry Pinkerton, Alan Jones and Michael Hartley	11:02	Sylvia Watson	14:30
1988	Gifford Kerr and Paul Mitchell	10:22	Maggie Dunn	16:32
1989	Michael Hartley	10:32	Inken Blunk	13:56
1990	Michael Hartley	11:19	Sylvia Watson	13:00
1991	Anthony Ratcliffe	10:11	Sue Dalton	13:21
1992	Philip Clark	10:50	Wendy Holmes	14:31
1993	Philip Clark	10:12	Ruth Pickvance	12:37
1994	Mark Hartell	10:28	Anne Stentiford	13:09
1995	Ian Hill	10:40	Glynda Cook	13:32
1996	Mark Hartell	10:30	Glynda Cook	13:26
1997	Mark Hartell	10:49	Glynda Cook	15:48
1998	Ian Hill	11:05	Glynda Cook	12:55
1999	Mark Hartell	11:15	Glynda Cook	17:05
2000	Mark Hartell	10:52	Susan Manley	20:05
2001	Cancelled due to foot-and-mouth outbreak			
2002	Ian Magee	11:56	Susan Manley	17:37
2003	Mark Hartell	10:54	Marion Fletcher	18:05
2004	Mark Hartell	10:16	Susan Manley	21:17
2005	Mark Hartell	10:15	Sarah Rowell	15:31
2006	Mark Hartell	11:37	Sarah Rowell	14:24
2007	Mark Hartell	11:08	Mandy Calvert	16:07
2008	Mark Hartell	12:07	Christine Preston	14:46
2009	Jez Bragg	10:50	Sarah Rowell	13:45
2010	Duncan Harris	11:00	Nicky Spinks	12:39
2011	Jez Bragg	10:06	Nicky Spinks	11:51
2012	Jez Bragg	11:02	Nicky Spinks	13:35
2013	Adam Perry	10:34	Nicky Spinks	12:36
2014	Kim Collison and Adam Perry	10:51	Carol Morgan	14:29
2015	Adam Perry	10:23	Jasmin Paris	11:09
2016	Konrad Rawlik	11:31	Karen Nash	15:45
2017	Chris Perry	11:21	Emma Hopkinson	14:45
2018	Neil Talbott	11:16	Jessica Richardson	14:01
2019	Stuart Walker	11:18	Sabrina Verjee	12:23
2020	Cancelled due to the COVID-19 pandemic			
2021	Cancelled due to the COVID-19 pandemic			
2022	Oli Johnson and Damian Hall	11:23	Fiona Pascall	12:08
2023	Oli Johnson	11:24	Claire Nance	13:56
2024	Kim Collison	11:07	Emma Stuart	11:36
2025	Evan Allan	10:43	Anna Llewellyn	10:18
2026	Barney Plummer	10:57	Despina Berdeni	13:33

== See also ==
- Bill Smith (fell runner)
