= Ramsay Round =

Long distance running event

Coordinates: 56°46.5′N 4°56′W

The Ramsay Round, also known as the Charlie Ramsay Round, is a long distance hill running challenge near Fort William, Scotland. The route is a circuit of roughly 58 miles (93 kilometres), taking in 24 summits with a total climb of around 28,500 feet (8,700 metres). Ben Nevis, Great Britain's highest peak, is included in the route along with 22 other Munros. Originally, all 24 summits on the Ramsay Round were Munros, but Sgurr an Iubhair was declassified as a Munro in 1997. The route was devised by Charlie Ramsay as an extension to Tranter’s Round, an existing 24-hour walking route, and first completed by Ramsay on 8-9 July 1978.

Charlie's completion created Scotland's classic round, intentionally the Scottish equivalent of the Paddy Buckley Round (which in turn was the Welsh equivalent of the Bob Graham). Participants must complete the route on foot, starting and finishing at the Glen Nevis Youth Hostel, and may take the route in either a clockwise or anticlockwise direction. Whichever direction is chosen, all tops must be taken in order.

Until June 2015, the fastest time recorded was that of Adrian Belton from Baslow in Derbyshire. He recorded a time of 18 hours 23 mins.

On 12 June 2015, this record was broken by Jez Bragg with a new time of 18 hours 12 minutes. Soon after, on 5 July 2015, the record was lowered again, this time by Jon Ascroft in a time of 16 hours 59 minutes.

On Saturday 18 June 2016, Jasmin Paris set a new record outright (both for women and men) for the Ramsay Round, knocking 46 minutes from the previous fastest round to set a new time of 16 hours 13 minutes. Previously the fastest women’s time was that of Nicky Spinks who on 31 May 2014 recorded a time of 19 hours 39 minutes for a clockwise round, breaking the previous record set by Helene Diamantides.

Es Tresidder set a new fastest time on 6 July 2019 when he ran the Round in 16 hours 12 minutes.

The record was reduced to 14 hours 42 minutes by Finlay Wild on 31 August 2020.

== Route ==
This is the original, anticlockwise route followed by Charlie Ramsay.

Summit		Altitude/m
	Glen Nevis Youth Hostel	~20
1	Mullach nan Coirean	939
2	Stob Bàn (Mamores)	999
3	Sgurr a' Mhàim	1099
4	Sgorr an Iubhair	1001
5	Am Bodach	1032
6	Stob Coire a' Chàirn	981
7	An Gearanach	982
8	Na Gruagaichean	1056
9	Binnein Mor	1130
10	Binnein Beag	943
11	Sgurr Eilde Mor	1010
12	Beinn na Lap	937
13	Chno Dearg	1046
14	Stob Coire Sgriodain	979
15	Stob a' Choire Mheadhoin	1105
16	Stob Coire Easain	1115
17	Stob Bàn (Grey Corries)	977
18	Stob Choire Claurigh	1177
19	Stob Coire an Laoigh	1116
20	Sgurr Choinnich Mor	1094
21	Aonach Beag	1234
22	Aonach Mor	1221
23	Carn Mor Dearg	1223
24	Ben Nevis	1345
	Glen Nevis Youth Hostel	~20
