= Original Mountain Marathon =

UK annual two-day orienteering event

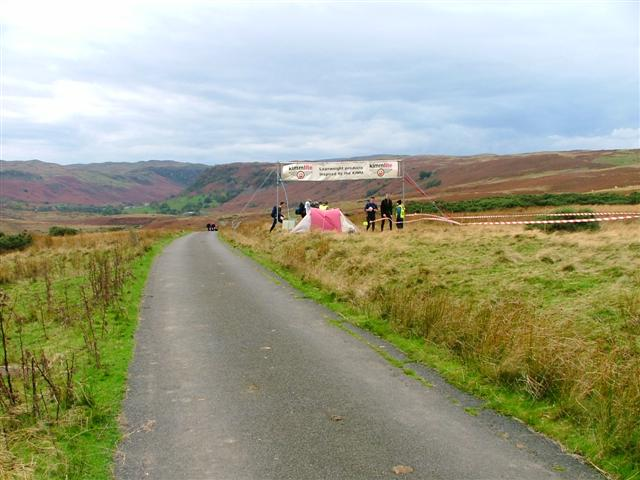
Road to Swindale

The Original Mountain Marathon (OMM), formerly known as the Karrimor International Mountain Marathon (or KIMM), and initially simply The Karrimor, is an annual two-day Mountain event, held in October in a different region across the UK each year. It was first held in 1968 and continues today. Gerry Charnley, a skilled mountaineer and orienteer, designed the KIMM to test orienteering skills in extreme circumstances; the full-length KIMM course is a double-marathon length race. Each team must carry all their gear, including equipment for an overnight camp. Moreover, the course is not disclosed until the race begins, so each team must have good navigation skills. Some have called the KIMM the forerunner of modern adventure racing.

== History ==
For its first 8 years, the event was known as 'The Karrimor'. In addition to the 'Elite category' double marathon, other course lengths have been added over the years to suit a greater variety of competitors (see 'Classes of competition' below). The core elements remain, however: there is always an overnight camp and the teams of two must be self-sufficient.

The KIMM name was adopted in 1976.

After Galloway in 1976 which experienced exceptionally bad weather with only 30% completing, Gerry Charnley spoke in a TV interview with the BBC: "Don't you think this event is too tough?" asked the interviewer, and Charnley responded: "Everybody knows this is the KIMM, the toughest event on the calendar and it's not a Sunday afternoon picnic". This attitude has remained throughout the event's history and places it as one of the most challenging mountain marathons in the world.

In 1977, a special map from Harvey Maps was commissioned.

In 2004 the event became known as the OMM after Karrimor's sponsorship was withdrawn.

The 2008 OMM was abandoned, for the first time in the race's history.

In January 2010 the ownership of OMM, the event and the products was bought by Ark Consultants UK Ltd.

In 2013, the organisers of the Original Mountain Marathon revealed plans for a summer version of the event, along with a mountain biking marathon.

== List of event locations ==
Year	Location	Region	Elite Winners
2026	Talnotry	Scotland	
2025	Shap Abbey (Lake District)	Cumbria	Felix Wilson & Dan Ashwood
2024	Glen Artney	Scotland	Philip Rutter & Finlay Wild
2023	Snowdonia / Eryri	North Wales	Philip Rutter & Sam Dixon
2022	Great Langdale	Cumbria	Philip Rutter & Sam Dixon
2021	Great Langdale	Cumbria	Race cancelled due to extreme weather
2020	Arrochar Alps	West Scotland	Race cancelled due to COVID-19
2019	Clyde Muirshiel Regional Park	Scotland	Graham Gristwood & Hector Haines
2018	Black Mountains	South Wales	Jonathan Albon & Gudmund Viljo Arponen Snilstveit
2017	Great Langdale	Cumbria	Duncan Archer & Shane Ohly
2016	Glentrool	South West Scotland	Duncan Archer & Shane Ohly
2015	Tweedsmuir	Scottish Borders	Kim Collison & Adam Perry
2014	Northumberland	North East England	Sander Vaher & Timo Sild
2013	Brecon Beacons	South Wales	Nick Barrable & Gustav Bergman
2012	Howgill Fells	North West England	Björn Rydvall & Aaron Prince
2011	Comrie	Scotland	Duncan Archer & Shane Ohly
2010	Dartmoor	South West England	Andy Symonds & Joe Symonds
2009	Elan Valley	Wales	Steve Birkinshaw & Jethro Lennox
2008	Borrowdale	Cumbria	Race Abandoned
2007	Lowther Hills	Scotland	Brendon Bolland & Sean Bolland
2006	Galloway Forest Park	Scotland	Ifor Powell & Alun Powell
2005	Ullswater	Cumbria	Steve Birkinshaw & Morgan Donnelly
2004	Brecon Beacons	South Wales	Mark Seddon & John Hunt
2003	Langholme	Scottish Borders	Steve Birkinshaw & Morgan Donnelly
2002	Cheviot	Northumberland	Steve Birkinshaw & Morgan Donnelly
2001	Clyde Muirsheil Regional Park	Scotland	Mark Seddon & Andrew Trigg
2000	Lake District	Cumbria	Mark Rigby & Rob Jebb tied with Mark Seddon & Andrew Trigg
1999	Cowal Peninsula Argyll	Scotland	Mark Seddon & Steve Birkinshaw
1998	Howgill Fells	North Pennines	Mark Seddon & Steve Birkinshaw
1997	Kielder Forest	North East England	Mark Seddon & Steve Birkinshaw
1996	Galloway Forest Park and Hills	Scotland	Mark Seddon & Pete James
1995	Brecon Beacons	South Wales	Mark Seddon & John Kewley
1994	St Mary's Loch and Manor	Scotland	Mark Seddon & Paul Hague
1993	Upper Nithsdale & Queensberry Hills	Scotland	Mark Seddon & Paul Hague
1992	Northern Lake District	Cumbria	Olivier Buholzer & Matthias Ramsauer
1991	Arrochar Alps	Scotland	Mark McDermott & Adrian Belton
1990	Glen Lyon	Scotland	Phil Clark and Graham Huddleston
1989	Howgill Fells	North Pennines	Derek Ratcliffe & Pete Irwin
1988	Cheviots	Northumberland	Aonghus O'Cleirigh & Robin Bryson
1987	Ffestiniog Snowdonia	North Wales	Derek Ratcliffe & Pete Irwin
1986	Galloway Hills	Scotland	Derek Ratcliffe & Pete Irwin
1985	Langdale (Lake District)	Cumbria	Ken Taylor & Robin Bryson
1984	Peak District	Pennines	Derek Ratcliffe & Pete Irwin
1983	Strathyre	Scotland	Derek Ratcliffe & Pete Irwin
1982	Dartmoor	South West England	Jack Maitland & John Baston
1981	Langdale	Cumbria	Joss Naylor & Mike Walford
1980	Isle of Arran	Scotland	Dieter Wolf & Leonhard Suter
1979	Rhinogs	North Wales	Dieter Wolf & Leonhard Suter
1978	Peebles	Scotland	Roger Baumeister & Martin Hudson
1977	Howgill Fells	North Pennines	Andy Philipson & Howard Forrest
1976	Galloway Highlands	Scotland	Stig Berge & Sigurd Dæhli
1975	Ennerdale	Cumbria	Joss Naylor & Pete Walkington
1974	College Valley, Cheviot	Northumberland	Stig Berge & Harry Walker
1973	Plas Gwynant	North Wales	Stig Berge & Carl Martin Larsen
1972	Tibbie Shiels (Selkirk)	Scottish Borders	Stig Berge & Carl Martin Larsen
1971	Plas-y-Brenin	North Wales	Joss Naylor & Allan Walker
1970	Eskdale	West Cumbria	Joss Naylor & Allan Walker
1969	Troutbeck (Windermere)	Cumbria	Ted Dance & Bob Astles
1968	Muker	North Pennines	Ted Dance & Bob Astles

== Classes of competition ==
OMM currently comprises six competition classes (three line events and three score courses) which vary in length and severity, approximately as follows:

1. Elite 80 km 12 hrs
2. A class 65 km 11 hrs
3. B class 40 km 8 hrs
4. Long Score 7+6 hrs (day 1/2)
5. Medium Score 6+5hrs
6. Short Score 5+4hrs

== Compulsory kit list ==
- Warm Trousers or Leggings
- Shirt or Thermal Top
- Sweater or Fleece Top
- Waterproof Over Trousers (taped seams)
- Waterproof Jacket (taped seams)
- Socks, gloves & hat
- Head Torch
- Whistle
- Food For 36 Hours
- Additional Emergency Rations
- Compass (GPS Not Allowed)
- Sleeping Bag
- Footwear With Adequate Grip For Fell Conditions
- Space Blanket or large heavy gauge polythene bag
- Rucksack
- First-Aid, a minimum of a crepe bandage and small wound dressings.
- Pen Or Pencil
- Tent With Sewn-In Groundsheet
- Cooking Stove with enough fuel at the end of day 2 to make a hot drink

== OMM Brand ==
OMM have started producing their own branded outdoor clothing and equipment. Items required on the event, such as waterproof jackets and trousers, backpacks and sleeping bags, have been produced, specially adapted for the event. The Kamleika (from the Aleutian word for a long waterproof robe) range of jackets, smocks and trousers have become famous amongst mountain marathon runners and hikers. They are unique in that they are specially developed to be stretchy and produce minimal noise when running.

== Swiss KIMM ==
1976 Swiss Orienteer Dieter Wolf brought the Karrimor International Mountain Marathon idea from England to Switzerland: 47 teams were at the start of the first Swiss Karrimor 2-day Mountain Marathon in Muotathal in 1976. Over the years several thousand lovers of the mountains, nature, orienteering and adventure sports from more than twenty countries have been able to participate in many different regions of the Swiss Alps.

After some structural and personnel changes at Karrimor ltd. in England and Salewa Sport ltd. in Switzerland, a new partner had to be found for the event in 1997 so as to achieve a balanced account. Arova-Mammut, a Swiss firm manufacturing mountain sport equipment, stepped in spontaneously, so that the event had to be changed only little; under a new name its organisation would be secure for the next few years. The long cooperation with Arova-Mammut ltd. came to an end in 2002.

R’adys Outdoor & Snowwear in Lachen became a new sponsor in 2004. 2013 R'adys sponsorship ended and the Event is now called SIMM (Swiss International Mountain Marathon).

This Mountain Marathon is unique in Switzerland.
