= Andy Styan =

British fell runner (born 1947)

Andrew Styan (born 12 December 1947) is a British fell runner who was the national champion in 1979.

He first made an impact in fell running when he won at Burnsall in 1974, his fast descent moving him up from sixth position at the high point of the race to first place at the finish.

He won the Langdale Horseshoe in 1977, when he set the still-standing record of 1:55:03. He believed he was able to run so quickly due to the good conditions and the very strong competition on the day from Billy Bland, Alan McGee and Mike Short.

In addition to Langdale, Styan performed well in many other events, especially in the long races. His victories included the Ennerdale Horseshoe, Wasdale, Duddon Valley, the Edale Skyline and the Isle of Jura.

He was the runner-up in the British Fell Running Championships in 1978, then improved to be the champion the following year.

Styan was editor of The Fell Runner between 1979 and 1982.
