= Jez Bragg =

British ultramarathon runner

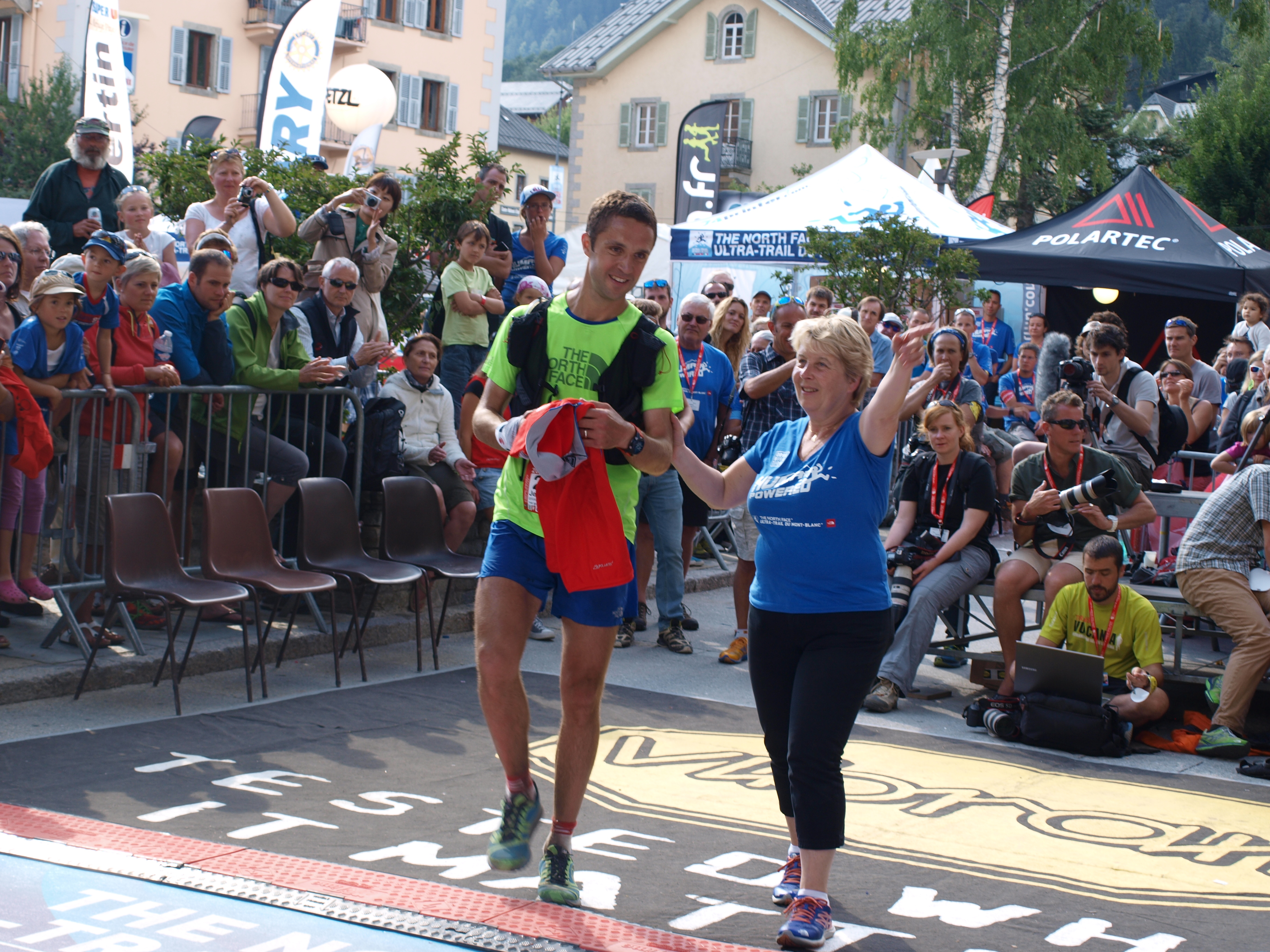
Jeremy Bragg UTMB 2013

Jeremy Bragg (born 13 April 1981) is a British ultramarathon runner.

A notable performance early in Bragg’s running career was at the West Highland Way Race in 2006 which he won in a time of 15:44, then a course record. The next year, he was the United Kingdom 100k champion and finished in eighteenth position at the IAU 100 km World Championships in Winschoten.

In 2009, Bragg was victorious at both the Anglo Celtic Plate 100k, where he finished in a time of 6:58, and in the 100k race at the Commonwealth Mountain and Ultradistance Running Championships in Keswick. The same year, he competed in the 100 mile Western States Endurance Run, finishing in third place. He returned to the latter event in 2011, when he was fourth in a time of 15:55.

Bragg won the UTMB in 2010 when it was restarted over a shortened route after the initial race was cancelled due to inclement weather and a mudslide.

In 2011, he set a course record of 10:06 at the Fellsman in the Yorkshire Dales.

Bragg set the fastest known time for Te Araroa in New Zealand in late 2012 and early 2013, completing the route of approximately 3,050 kilometres (1,900 mi) in fifty-three days. The record was broken in 2020 when George Henderson completed Te Araroa in forty-nine days. However, the completions were not strictly comparable as Henderson used powered transport around breaks in the trail whereas Bragg's entire journey was self-powered, including paddling across the Cook Strait.

Bragg ran Ramsay's Round in 2015 in a time of 18:12, which stood briefly as the record until it was beaten by John Ascroft.
