= Kamleika =

Waterproof Aleut Garment

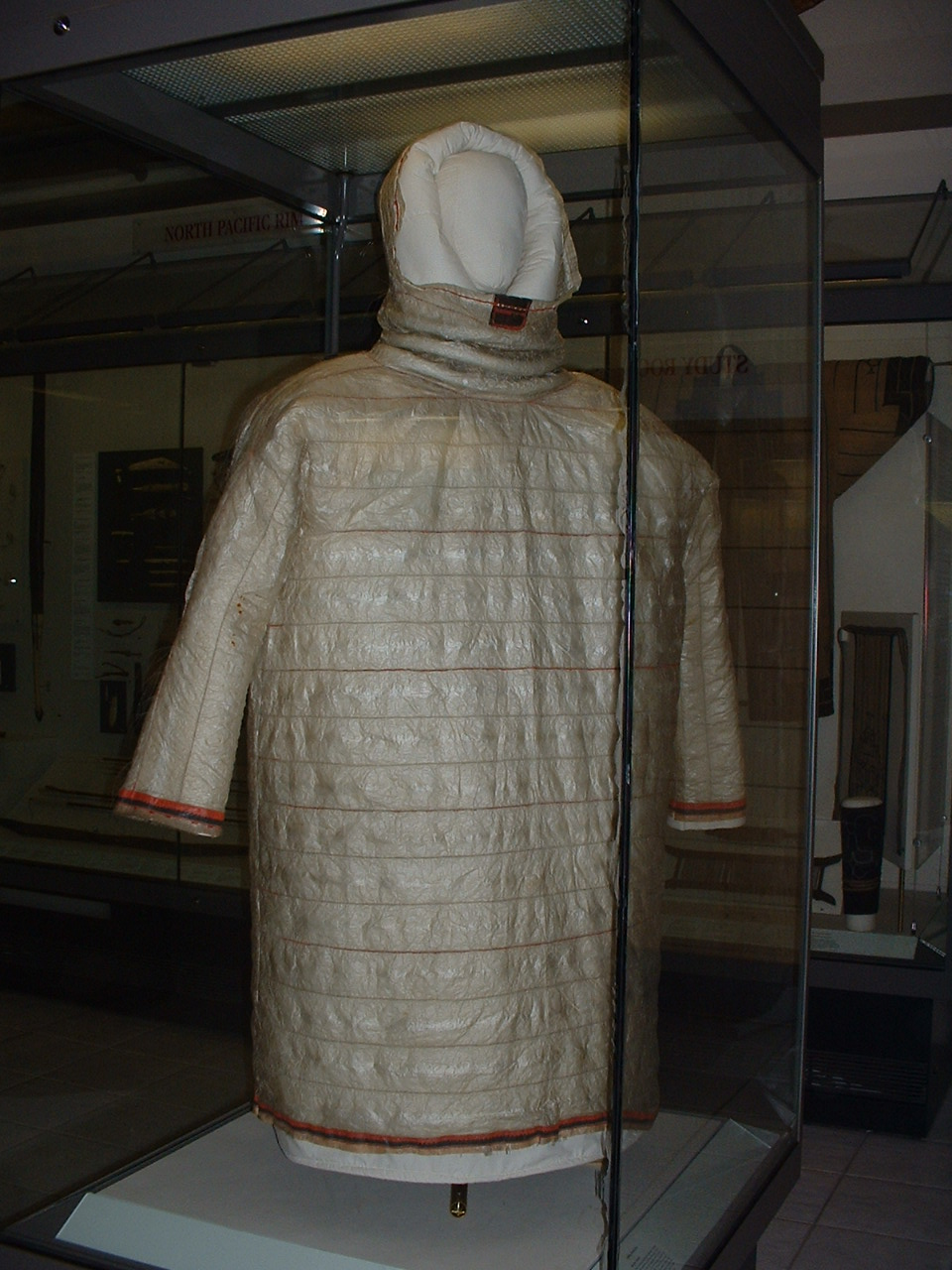
A Kamleika displayed at the Royal Albert Memorial Museum & Art Gallery

A kamleika is an Aleut robe made from sea mammal (mostly sea otter) intestine, which was light and waterproof. They also sometimes had robes to protect against threats such as heavy wind and rain. They were sewn with grass, and each took around a month to make.

Another type of kamleikas were made as ceremonial robes, and were much more decorative than the hunting kind. These did not have hoods, and had beads all over the robe. After contact with Russians and Europeans, they were given as gifts.

The Russians called traditional Aleut gut garments kamleikas; this word has been borrowed into Yup'ik from the Russian as kamliikaq, and that word has been used generally for any gut garment.

== See also ==
- Original Mountain Marathon
