= Jasmin Paris =

British runner (born 1983)

Jasmin Paris MBE
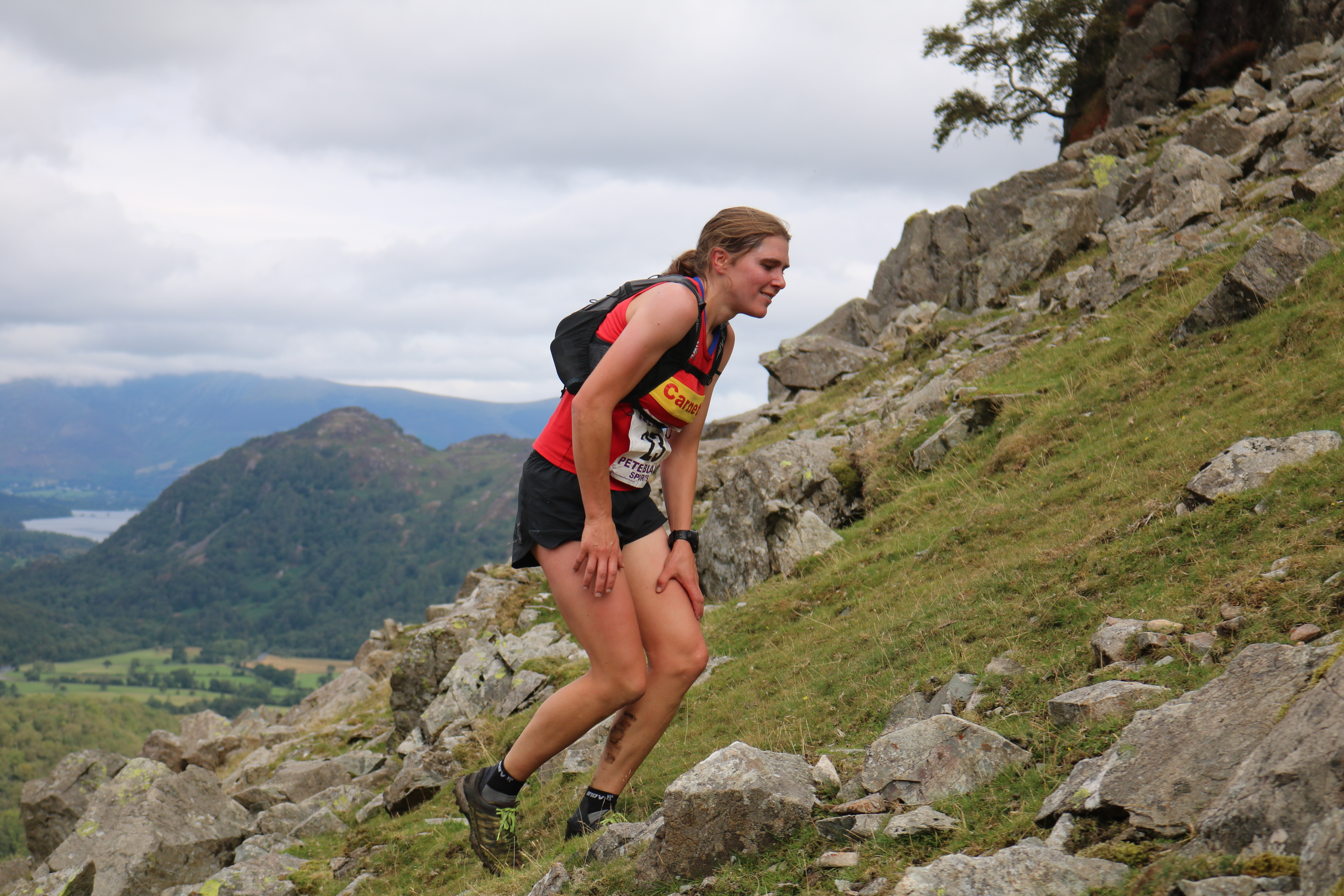
- Paris during the 2018 Borrowdale Fell Race

Personal information
- Full name: Jasmin Karina Paris
- Born: November 1983 (age 42–43) Manchester
- Father: Jeff Paris

Sport
- Country: Great Britain
- Sport: Skyrunning
Medal record
Skyrunning
World Championships
| Bronze medal – third place | 2016 Lleida | Ultra SkyMarathon |

Jasmin Karina Paris MBE (born November 1983) is a British runner who has been a national fell running champion and who has set records for the Bob Graham Round and the Ramsay Round. In 2024, she became the first woman to successfully complete the Barkley Marathons.

She won the 2016 Skyrunner World Series Sky Extreme category, and a bronze medal at the 2016 Skyrunning World Championships in the Sky Ultra category. She received significant media attention for beating the all-time men's course record by 12 hours at the 2019 Spine Race.

She is a senior lecturer in the Royal (Dick) School of Veterinary Studies at the University of Edinburgh.

== Early life and education ==
Paris was born in Manchester and grew up in the Peak District. She attended Manchester High School for Girls. She has an undergraduate degree from the University of Liverpool (2008) and a Ph.D. from the University of Edinburgh (2020). Her doctoral thesis was "Novel regulators of cancer stem cell biology in acute myeloid leukaemia."

== Running career ==
While at the University of Liverpool, Paris was a member of the Open Air Club which encouraged outdoor pursuits. However, she did not start running until she left university in 2008 and was working in Glossop near her home town of Hadfield in Derbyshire, although she had done some backpacking and walked a lot in the fells. After a twelve-month sabbatical in Minnesota, she returned to the UK, moved to Edinburgh in 2010 and began to take running more seriously.

She has performed particularly well in the longer fell races. Her wins include the Three Peaks Race, Wasdale, Borrowdale, the Langdale Horseshoe, the Ennerdale Horseshoe and the Isle of Jura, and she has won the Lakeland Classics Trophy series.

Paris won the Scottish Hill Running Championships in 2014 and 2015 and in 2015 and 2018 she won the British Fell Running Championships.

In 2015, Paris began to be more prominent in ultra distance running. In April that year, she set a new women's record of 11:09 in the Fellsman, finishing fourth overall, and in June, she was the first female finisher and second overall in the five-day Dragon's Back Race in Wales.

On 23 April 2016, Paris completed the Bob Graham Round in a time of 15:24, taking more than two-and-a-half hours off the women's record previously held by Nicky Spinks. The record stood until July 2020 when Beth Pascall ran the Bob Graham Round in 14:34.

Paris ran the Ramsay Round on 18 June 2016 in a time of 16:13. This was not only a new women's record, but an overall fastest known time for the route. It remained the overall record until 2019, when Es Tresidder ran the Round a minute quicker.

In July 2016, Paris took third place in the Buff Epic Trail 105K which was the 2016 Skyrunning World Championships race for the ultra category. In August, she finished sixth at the UTMB, her first 100-mile race.

In September, Paris was crowned champion in the Extreme series of the 2016 Skyrunner World Series, having won both the Tromsø SkyRace and the Glen Coe Skyline. In October, she set a new women's record for the Paddy Buckley Round with a time of 18:33.

Paris set a new race record in the 2019 Spine Race along the Pennine Way, finishing the 268 miles (431.3 km) on 16 January in 83 hours 12 minutes and 23 seconds. Becoming the first woman to win the event overall, she surpassed the previous record of 95 hours 17 minutes set by Eoin Keith in 2016 and the previous female record of 109 hours 54 minutes achieved by Carol Morgan in 2017. During breaks in the race she expressed milk for her baby.

Paris completed a circuit of twenty-nine Munros in the Cairngorms in July 2021, setting a women's record for climbing the most Munros and returning to the starting point within twenty-four hours. Later the same year, she won the Ultra Tour Monte Rosa in Switzerland.

Paris was sponsored by Inov-8 until 2022, when she opted to run for The Green Runners, an environmental group of which she is a co-founder.

In March 2022, Paris competed in the Barkley Marathons in Frozen Head State Park, Tennessee. She completed a "Fun Run" of three loops, the first time for nine years that a woman had done so. In March 2023, she was only the second woman ever to attempt a fourth loop; she completed loop four, however not within the time limit. In March 2024, she became the first woman to complete the event. Paris finished the event in 59:58:21, just 99 seconds inside the cut-off time.

== Awards ==
Paris was appointed MBE in the 2024 Birthday Honours. She was described as "Ultrarunner", and the award was "For services to Fell and Long-Distance Running."

== Personal life ==
She is the daughter of mathematicians Jeff Paris and Alena Vencovská.

In 2016, Paris married Konrad Rawlik, who is also a runner with a win in the Fellsman. They have a daughter and a son.

She is a small-animal vet and a senior lecturer in the Royal (Dick) School of Veterinary Studies at the University of Edinburgh.

In 2016, she was a guest speaker at the Kendal Mountain Festival.
