= Helene Diamantides =

Fell runner

Helene Diamantides is a fell runner.

== Early life ==
Helene Diamantides was born in 1964 in North Yorkshire, but she spent most of her childhood outside England. She lived in Ghana and later in Greece where as a teenager she competed internationally in the pentathlon and her running ability was encouraged and developed. At sixteen, she completed her first marathon. In 1982 she moved to Durham to study for a degree in education. It was through the University of Durham's running club that she first began fell running. Over the next five years she competed in various fell races, including the Karrimor International Mountain Marathon.

== Fell running achievements ==
In 1987 Diamantides completed her first Bob Graham Round (BG): to run 66 miles (106 km) over 42 Lake District peaks within 24 hours. Later that year she and fellow fell-runner Alison Wright went to Nepal to attempt to break the record for running from Everest Base Camp to Kathmandu. This is a 188-mile (303 km) route which includes 42,000 feet (13,000 m) of ascent. Both women completed the route in a record of 3 days, 10 hours.

In 1988 Diamantides won both the women's events in the 31 km Mount Cameroon race and the Mount Kinabalu race in Borneo; and she came third in the 100-mile (160 km) Hogger 'Super Marathon' in Algeria. In the same year she also set a new women's record for the BG: 20 h 17 min.

The next year Diamantides' ambition was to complete in one summer all three of the classic British 24-hour rounds: the English Bob Graham Round, the Welsh Paddy Buckley Round, and the Scottish Ramsay Round. The first was the Paddy Buckley which was completed in 20 h 8 min; beating the men's record (held by Adrian Belton) by two hours. One month later she ran the Ramsay Round. She was then only the sixth person to successfully complete it and did so with a time of 20 h 24 min.

In 1992, with Martin Stone, Diamantides entered The Dragon's Back race, a new 220-mile (350 km) five-day race across the length of Wales; she and Stone won the race in 38 h 38 min. During the 2012 second running of the Dragon's Back Race, Diamantides finished in fourth place overall and first place as a woman.

She won the Borrowdale Fell Race four times, with her 1999 time of 3 h 14 min 45 s the second-fastest ever in the women's race and within ten seconds of Menna Angharad's course record. In 1990, Diamantides set a course record in the Wasdale Fell Race, which stood until 1997 when it was beaten by Mari Todd. Diamantides held the course record for the Langdale Horseshoe from 1992 until 2016, when it was broken by Victoria Wilkinson.

== Personal life ==
Diamantides has two children. She married her partner Jon Whitaker in 2005. She works as a physiotherapist.

== Sources ==
- Information taken from: Askwith, Richard, Feet in the Clouds, Chapter 29, London: Aurum Press, 2005.
- Timesonline
- Ultrafondus
