= Mark Rigby (runner) =

British runner (born 1962)

Mark Alan Rigby (born 1962) is a British runner who was a national hill running champion and who represented Scotland in the World Mountain Running Trophy.

He ran during his time at Bradford Grammar School and later went to St Catharine's College, Cambridge, where he was captain of the cross country team. When still a student, he won the Lyke Wake Race.

Rigby has won many of the most prestigious fell races, including Ben Nevis, Borrowdale, the Isle of Jura, Wasdale, the Langdale Horseshoe, Duddon Valley, the Three Shires, Glamaig, and Stuc a' Chroin. His winning times for Ben Nevis and Wasdale, both set in 1990, are among the fastest in the history of those races and have not been beaten since.

He also won the navigational Lake District Mountain Trial and, in team events, he has been victorious in the Karrimor International Mountain Marathon with Rob Jebb and won the Kings of the Mountains award with Adrian Belton as the fastest runners in the Three Peaks Yacht Race.

Rigby was the Scottish hill running champion in 1995, 1998 and 2002. As a veteran, he won the over-40 category in the British Fell Running Championships in 2003.

During the 1990s, he represented Scotland several times at the World and European Mountain Running Trophies. In the global championships, he finished thirty-fifth in the 1990 edition, and he was twenty-second in the European event in 1998.

In 1988, Rigby completed a circuit of the Cairngorms, including the seventeen Munros in the area, in a time of 22:44. Other runners have since taken on this challenge, now including eighteen Munros due to reclassification of the peaks, and it has come to be known as the Rigby Round.
