= Connemarathon =

Marathon in County Galway, Ireland

The Connemara International Marathon, known as the Connemarathon, is a marathon in Connemara, County Galway, Ireland.

Comprising a road half marathon, a full marathon and a 39.3 mile ultramarathon, it typically takes place in April each year.

First held in 2002, an ultramarathon event was added to the schedule in 2004. The ultramarathon is 63.58 km long with a total ascent of 146.49 m and a maximum elevation of 99.64 m.

There were 2,000 participants in the 2006 Connemarathon, and over 3,000 people reportedly participated in the 2010 event.

Participants of the marathon and ultramarathon races have come from many countries; winners have come from Brazil, Italy, the Netherlands, the United Kingdom, Poland and Kenya.

== Marathon Winners ==
Key: Course record (in bold)

Year	Male Winner	Time	Female Winner	Time
2002	Eric Mulkerrins	2:57:49	Eileen Donaghue	4:18:22
2003	Isaac Kimuge	2:29:30	Lucy D' Arcy	3:29:07
2004	Nicolas McGuinness	2:33:12	Mary B. Jennings	3:13:17
2005	Peter Palmans	2:50:38	Josephine Kiprop	3:01:06
2006	Martin Halvey	2:57:16	Mary B. Jennings	3:24:02
2007	Ismael Pereira Da Silva	2:32:32	Sharon Daw	3:17:14
2008	Simone Grassi	2:48:40	Rachael Beck	3:11:27
2009	Simone Grassi	2:40:24	Shirley Coyle	3:10:18
2010	Ricky Reusser	2:30:39	Erin Manlove	3:08:28
2011	Freddy Keron Sittuk	**2:27:48**	Fionnuala Doherty	3:11:47
2012	George Waugh	2:36:21	Martina O'Mahony	3:21:26
2013	Gary O'Hanlon	2:35:15	Catherine Hogan	3:27:26
2014	Philip Harty	2:29:16	Janice White	3:20:35
2015	Eddie Blanchard	2:48:07	Mary Laverty	**2:57:38**
2016	Dariusz Monkiewicz	2:53:16	Noeleen O'Malley	3:26:58
2017	Lyall Guiney	2:47:12	Hannah Fothergill	3:03:43
2018	Brian Gurrin	2:51:16	Hannah Howard	3:07:02
2019	Brian Gurrin	2:57:19	Jaskiran Buttar	3:24:58
2020	**canceled** due to the	Covid	Pandemic	- -
2021	**canceled** due to the	Covid	Pandemic	- -
2022	Paul Ogle	2:56:36	Jacqueline Rustidge	3:24:33
2023	George Snee	2:36:21	Aine Kenny	3:19:10
2024	Michael Brady	2:42:31	Sarah Flanagan	3:03:56
2025	Féidhlim McGowan	2:30:53	Jennie O'Leary	3:29:08
2026	Marc Augustin	2:39:44	Aoife Hoare	3:10:03
