= Bob Graham Round =

English Lakeland fell-running challenge

The Bob Graham Round is a fell running (hill running) challenge in the English Lake District. It is named after Bob Graham (1889–1966), a Keswick guest-house owner, who in June 1932 broke the Lakeland Fell record by traversing 42 fells within a 24-hour period. Traversing the 42 fells, starting and finishing at Keswick Moot Hall, involves 66 miles (106 km) with 26,900 feet (8,200 m) of ascent.

The Round was first repeated, in a better time, in 1960 by Alan Heaton. Since then over 3000 individuals have completed the Round with the fastest time being 12hr 23m set by Jack Kuenzle in 2022, surpassing Kílian Jornet's record by almost 30 minutes. The women's record is 14hr 12m set by Katharina Hartmuth in 2026. The Lakeland 24 Hour record has also been improved with the current holder, Andy Berry, successfully reaching 78 summits in the allotted time.

Along with the Paddy Buckley Round and the Ramsay Round, the Bob Graham Round is one of the classic big three mountain challenges in the United Kingdom. Some fifty-six individuals have completed all three.

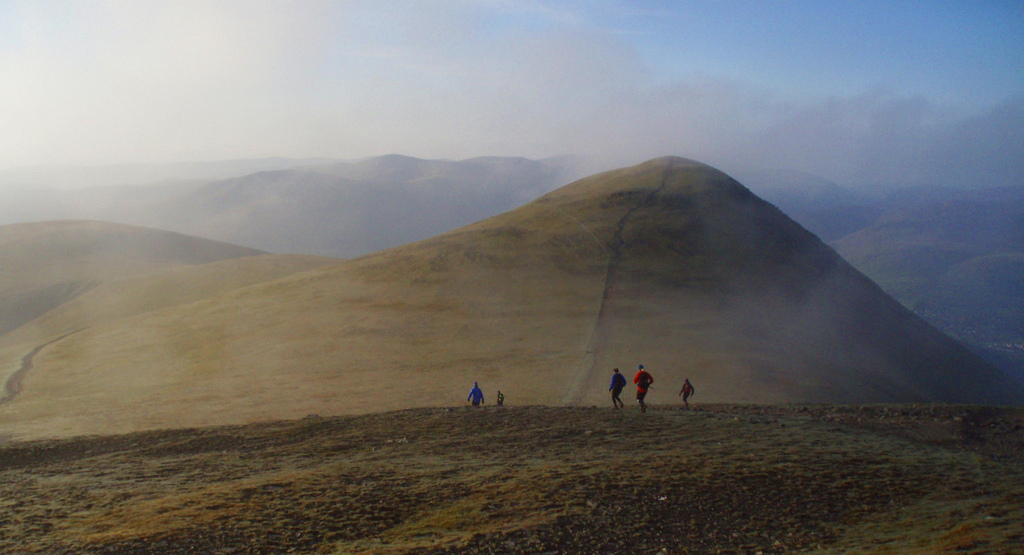
Bob Graham Round runner and supporters descending Skiddaw.

== History of the round ==
=== Early developments ===
Before the Bob Graham Round, many shorter rounds of the Lakeland fells were developed. These are chronicled in the Bob Graham Club's Story of the Bob Graham Round, in the fell-walking section of M. J. B. Baddeley's Lakeland guidebook, and most recently in Chapter 15 of Steve Chilton's It's a Hill, Get Over It: Fell Running's History and Characters.

Some of the more notable rounds:

- 1864: the Reverend J.M. Elliott of Cambridge traversed the summits around the head of Wasdale in 8.5 hours
- 1870: Thomas Watson of Darlington covered 48 miles (77 km) with over 10,000 feet (3,000 m) of ascent in 20 hours
- 1902: S.B. Johnson of Carlisle completed a 70-mile (110 km), 18,000-foot (5,500 m) round in 22.5 hours
- 1905: Dr Wakefield of Keswick completed the same round in 22h7m (recorded in The Sedberghian)
- 1920: Eustace Thomas, at age 54, covered the same round in 21h25m

Dr Wakefield codified the essentials of the challenge: "To traverse on foot as many tops over 2000ft and return to the starting point within 24 hours". Wakefield specified the start/finish point as Keswick's Moot Hall.

Wakefield also encouraged an attempt in May 1932 by Freddie Spencer Chapman, who completed a route similar to Bob Graham's subsequent successful round but finished over the time limit in 25 hours.

=== Bob Graham's initial Round ===
On 12–13 June 1932 Bob Graham extended the 24-hour Lakeland peak bagging record to a total of 42 peaks in a time of 23 hours 39 minutes. This was recognised as the new record, despite several tops claimed not reaching 2,000-foot (610 m) in altitude. The approximate distance of the new record (determined using current technology) was 66 miles (106 km) with 26,900 feet (8,200 m) of ascent. At the time the distance was claimed (though not by Graham himself) to be in excess of 130 miles (210 km) though the given amount of ascent was close to the currently accepted figure. Several 20th Century sources (including the 42 Peaks booklet) erroneously state the distance to be 72 miles (116 km).

=== The first repeat ===
In the early 1960s, at a time when the veteran walker Dr Barbara Moore was gaining publicity for doing the John o'Groats to Land's End walk, the Lakeland writer Harry Griffin noted that "You didn't need fitness for such walks, you could get fit whilst undertaking the challenge. The Lakeland 24 hour record on the other hand." As a result, Maurice Collett and Paul Stewart made an attempt starting from Langdale but, experiencing rough weather, completed the round in 27 hours 20 minutes. Also interested were the Heaton brothers from Lancashire who systematically set about attempting the record. After several attempts Alan Heaton finally broke the record in 1960, completing the circuit in 22 hours 18 minutes.

Bob Graham's original round included four tops that are not in what is now called the Bob Graham Round. These were:

- High White Stones (an area just to the north of High Raise)
- Hanging Knotts (a subsidiary summit of Bowfell)
- Looking Stead (a prominence on the ridge between Pillar and Black Sail Pass)
- High Snab Bank (a minor prominence on the ridge to the north of Robinson)

Alan Heaton replaced these with:

- White Side
- Helvellyn Lower Man
- Ill Crag
- Broad Crag

It is these along with the other 38 tops that are now called the "Bob Graham Round" and are listed below.

=== Subsequent developments ===
Heaton's new record inspired the addition of extra tops with the intent of extending the 24-hour record. As it was soon discovered that the route of Bob Graham's round was not optimal for attempts on the absolute fell record, the two are regarded as separate challenges and have slightly different rules. The 24-hour record has now been extended to 78 tops.

The Bob Graham Round is now a standard fell-runner's test-piece. Solo rounds have been accomplished but most contenders are accompanied by at least one runner in support, a requirement for acceptance of membership of the Bob Graham Club. The vast majority of attempts are undertaken close to mid summer to make use of maximum daylight. Nonetheless, as of 2025, there have been sixty seven successful winter completions of the standard circuit, five individuals have done two winter rounds. The current fastest time for a winter round is 14:54 by Arthur Hill in December 2025.

== The route ==
The round may be attempted either clockwise or anti-clockwise, provided that the start and finish is at the Moot Hall, Keswick. Predicted times for each stage of the round can be determined using an adaptation of Naismith's rule.

Fell summits of the Bob Graham Round

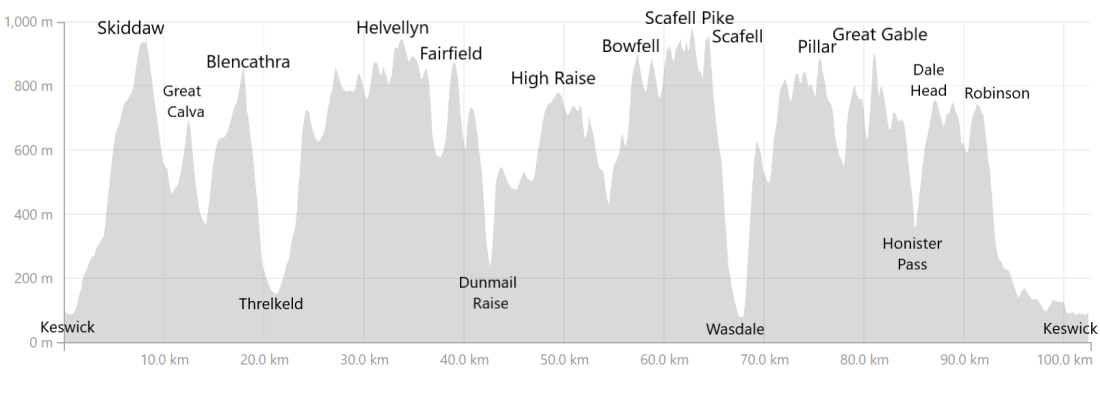
The route profile of the Bob Graham Round

Summit Sequence	Location
Start and Finish Line	Moot Hall, Keswick
1	Skiddaw
2	Great Calva
3	Blencathra
Road Crossing	Threlkeld
4	Clough Head
5	Great Dodd
6	Watson's Dodd
7	Stybarrow Dodd
8	Raise
9	White Side
10	Lowerman
11	Helvellyn
12	Nethermost Pike
13	Dollywaggon Pike
14	Fairfield
15	Seat Sandal
Road Crossing	Dunmail Raise
16	Steel Fell
17	Calf Crag
18	High Raise
19	Sergeant Man
20	Thunacar Knott
21	Harrison Stickle
22	Pike O' Stickle
23	Rossett Pike
24	Bowfell
25	Esk Pike
26	Great End
27	Ill Crag
28	Broad Crag
29	Scafell Pike
30	Scafell
Road Crossing	Wasdale Campsite
31	Yewbarrow
32	Red Pike
33	Steeple
34	Pillar
35	Kirk Fell
36	Great Gable
37	Green Gable
38	Brandreth
39	Grey Knotts
Road Crossing	Honister Pass
40	Dale Head
41	Hindscarth
42	Robinson
Start and Finish Line	Moot Hall, Keswick

== Record circuits ==
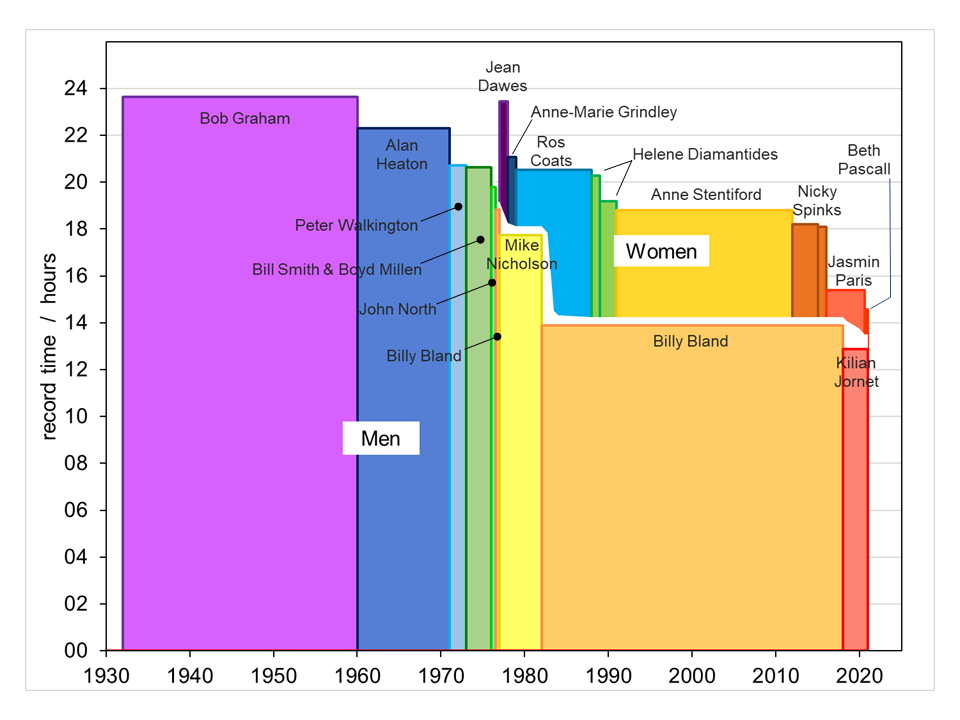
Successive men's and women's records for Bob Graham Round

The succession of fastest rounds by men for the standard 42 tops is:

- 1960: Alan Heaton – 22:18
- 1971: Peter Walkington – 20:43
- 1973: Bill Smith & Boyd Millen – 20:38
- 1976: John North – 19:48
- 1976: Billy Bland – 18:50
- 1977: Mike Nicholson – 17:45
- 1982: Billy Bland – 13:53
- 2018: Kílian Jornet - 12:52
- 2022: Jack Kuenzle - 12:23

The progression of fastest ladies' rounds is:

- 1977: Jean Dawes - 23:27
- 1978: Anne-Marie Grindley - 21:05
- 1979: Ros Coats - 20:31
- 1988: Helene Diamantides - 20:17
- 1989: Helene Diamantides - 19:11
- 1991: Anne Stentiford - 18:49
- 2012: Nicky Spinks - 18:12
- 2015: Nicky Spinks – 18:06
- 2016: Jasmin Paris - 15:24
- 2020: Beth Pascall - 14:34
- 2026: Katharina Hartmuth - 14:12

The progression of these record times is shown in the graph.

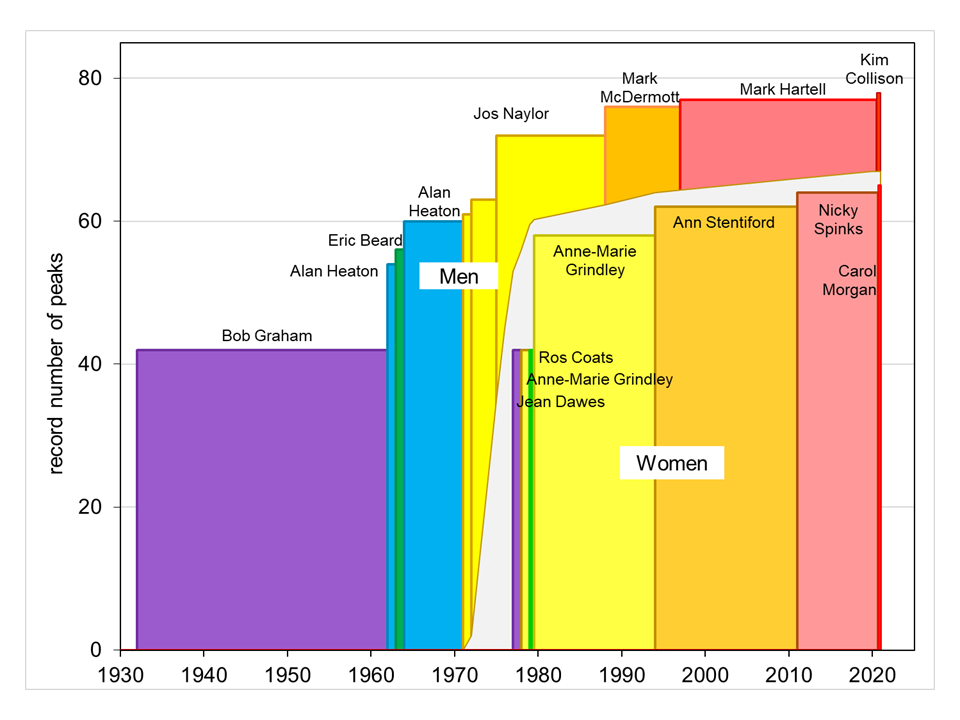
Successive men's and women's records for number of Lake District peaks climbed in 24 hours

Building on the basic Bob Graham Round, later runners raised the number of peaks traversed within 24 hours still further:

- 1962: Alan Heaton – 54 peaks in 23:48
- 1963: Eric Beard – 56 peaks, involving 88 miles (142 km) with 34,000 feet (10,000 m) of ascent in 23:35
- 1964: Alan Heaton – 60 peaks in 23:34
- 1971: Joss Naylor – 61 peaks in 23:37
- 1972: Joss Naylor – 63 peaks in 23:35
- 1975: Joss Naylor – 72 peaks involving over 100 miles (160 km) and 37,000 feet (11,000 m) of ascent in 23:20
- 1988: Mark McDermott – 76 peaks in 23:26
- 1997: Mark Hartell – 77 peaks in 23:47
- 2020: Kim Collison – 78 peaks in 23:45
- 2023: Andy Berry - 78 peaks in 23:23

The sequence of ladies 24-hour records (for the number of peaks traversed within 24 hours or for the same number of peaks in a faster time) is:

- 1977: Jean Dawes – 42 peaks in 23:37
- 1978: Anne-Marie Grindley – 42 peaks in 21:05
- 1979: Ros Coats – 42 peaks in 20:31
- 1979: Anne-Marie Grindley – 58 peaks in 23:20
- 1994: Ann Stentiford – 62 peaks in 23:17
- 2011: Nicky Spinks – 64 peaks in 23:15
- 2020: Carol Morgan - 65 peaks in 23:57
- 2021: Nicky Spinks - 65 peaks in 23:45
- 2022: Fiona Pascall - 68 peaks in 23:26

There is a subtle but important difference between the peaks used for the men's and ladies' records. At the time the base criteria (traverse more peaks or the same peaks as the current record in a faster time) were introduced (1971) there was no ladies record so it became based on the standard 42 peak round whereas route used for the men's record had diverged. This does limit the peaks available to extend the ladies' record.

The progression of the record for the number of peaks is shown in the graph.

Several later runners have successfully attempted 50 peaks at 50, and 55 peaks at 55. Notable achievements are:

- 1997: Joss Naylor attempted 60 peaks at age 60 over 36 hours (first to last peak) to raise money for Multiple Sclerosis research
- 2005: Yiannis Tridimas completed 60 peaks at age 60, in 23:52
- 2006: Joss Naylor completed 70 peaks at age 70, covering more than 50 miles and ascending more than 25,000 feet, in under 21 hours

=== Double Rounds ===
A double round is two rounds (132 miles and 54,000 feet of climbing) done consecutively, one round must be done clockwise and one anticlockwise. This has been achieved eleven times, five times within 48 hours, with the record held by James Gibson, his being the first to be completed in winter.

- 1977: Boyd Millen - 52:30
- 1979: Roger Baumeister - 46:34
- 1995: Eric Draper - 50:35
- 2016 May 14/15: Nicky Spinks - 45:30
- 2018: Tom Hollins - 52:30
- 2019 August 24/26: Stuart Walker - 51:18
- 2020 August 1/3 Gwynne Stokes - 54:30
- 2021 September 10/11: Dougie Zinis - 45:03
- 2025 May 6/8 Ben Swarbrick - 51:11
- 2025 June 21/22 Caspian James - 43:53
- 2025 December 27/28 James Gibson - 42:56

Baumeister, Spinks and Swarbrick started at Keswick, ran clockwise to Yewbarrow (peak 31 on a clockwise Round), reversed and ran back to Keswick, then continued anticlockwise to Yewbarrow (now peak 12 on an anticlockwise Round), before reversing again and completing the double traverse of all 42 peaks, once clockwise and once anticlockwise, at Keswick.

== The Bob Graham 24 Hour Club ==
The Bob Graham Club was proposed in 1971 by Fred Rogerson. It exists to record attempts at long distance challenges over the Lakeland fells. The majority of the club's activity is related to the Bob Graham Round itself. While there is no requirement for those attempting the round to apply for membership most do so. The Club does not organise attempts on the Round, this is left to each individual.

The rules for gaining club membership are simple:

- Starting at the Moot Hall in Keswick, traverse the 42 summits of the Round (or more) on foot and return to the starting point within 24 hours of the starting time.
- The visit to each summit must be witnessed by a companion and the time of that visit recorded.
- The times at each summit and names of companions are entered in the membership application form.

The second requirement effectively prevents solo rounds counting for club membership though several runners, both club members and non-members, have made solo rounds.

The club decided that from 1 January 2020, they will no longer accept rounds that use paid-for or commercial guiding services, in keeping with the ethos of the club of voluntary and mutual support.

The club had accepted 3,037 members by the end of 2025.

== See also ==
- South Wales Traverse
- Paddy Buckley Round A similar round in the mountains of Snowdonia.
- Ramsay Round The Scottish equivalent of the Bob Graham taking in 24 Munros on the ridges of The Grey Corries and the Mamores.
- Wicklow Round The eastern Irish equivalent, taking in 26 mountains in the Wicklow Mountains.
- Denis Rankin Round The Northern Irish equivalent, taking in the Mourne Mountains.
- The Lakes Classic Rock Round - A round that includes 1300 m of rock climbing.
