= Langdale Horseshoe =

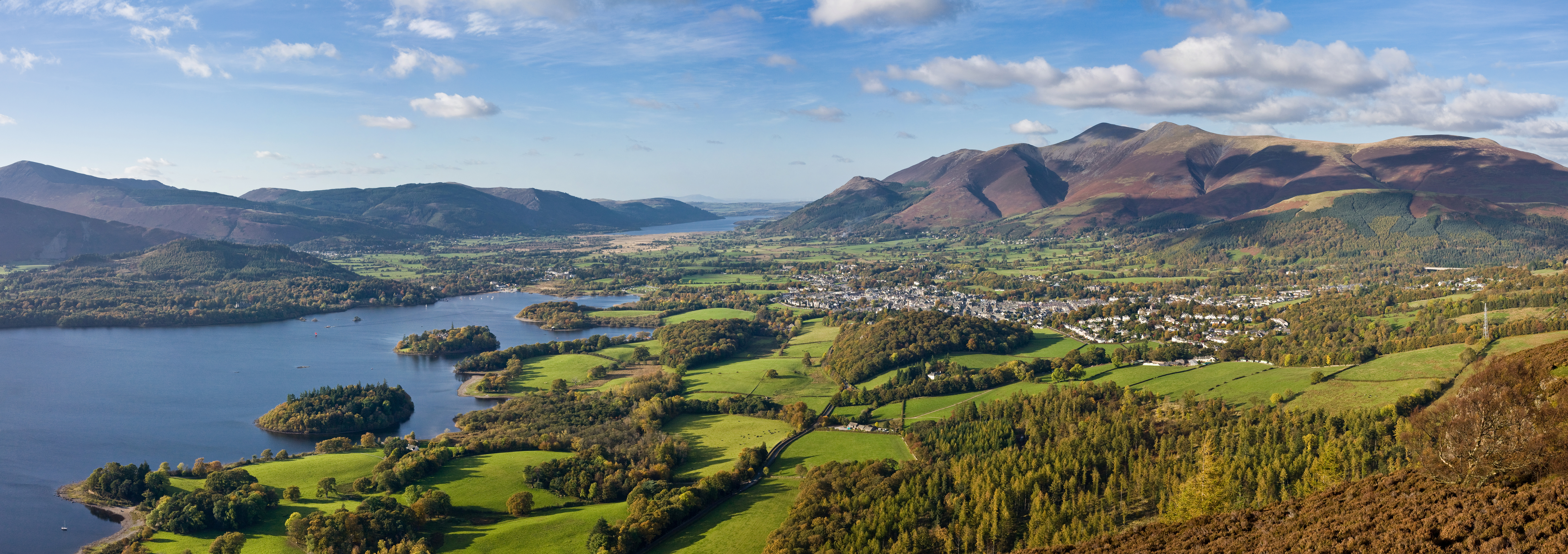
Lake District National Park, the venue of the Langdale Horseshoe

The Langdale Horseshoe is an annual Lake District fell race that starts and finishes at the Old Dungeon Ghyll. The course climbs to Stickle Tarn before heading to Thunacar Knott, Esk Hause shelter, Bowfell, Crinkle Crags and Pike of Blisco. The route is approximately 21 kilometres (13 mi) in length with 1,450 metres (4,760 ft) of ascent. It includes much rough and rocky ground. On the descent from Crinkle Crags, many runners negotiate the Bad Step, although it can be avoided depending on route choice. The race often presents navigational difficulties, especially in poor visibility.

== History ==
The Langdale Horseshoe was first held in 1973, when it was organised by Dave Meek of Ambleside and the Langdale Fell Race Association. It was sponsored by Quiggin's Kendal Mint Cake. In 1977, a shorter ladies’ race up Pike of Blisco was held in conjunction with the Langdale Horseshoe but from 1978, women were allowed to compete over the full course.

Due to a lack of volunteers to help with race organisation, the 1982 race was not run over the usual course but on a route up and down Scafell Pike. No race was held the next year but it was relaunched in 1984 by Ambleside AC. In 1986, the race had over five hundred runners and in order to reduce the strain on the organisational resources and the local area, it was decided that from the following year, only pre-entered competitors would be allowed to take part.

Langdale is one of the races in the Lakeland Classics Trophy series which was inaugurated in 2002.

In its early years, the race was held in September, but it now takes place in October. It has been one of the counting races in the English Fell Running Championships several times. As it takes place relatively late in the season, it is often the last race in the series on such occasions and can play a significant part in the championship results. In 2005, for example, Rob Hope was joint winner in the English Championships due in part to his triumph at the Langdale Horseshoe immediately after returning from the World Mountain Running Trophy in New Zealand.

== Results ==
Langdale has one of the oldest course records in fell running, with a time of 1:55:03 set by Andy Styan in 1977. Styan felt that he had been able to run so quickly due to the good conditions and the very strong competition on the day. Styan, Billy Bland, Alan McGee and Mike Short all finished in between 1:55:03 and 1:56:08 that year. Since then, the fastest winning time has been 1:56:13 by Gavin Bland in 1997.

A new women's record of 2:22:50 was set by Victoria Wilkinson in 2016, beating the previous best of Helene Diamantides which had stood since 1992.

Billy Bland won five times between 1978 and 1987 and his nephew Gavin Bland won five times between 1990 and 2003. In the women’s race, Pauline Haworth, Ruth Pickvance, Kelli Roberts and Jasmin Paris each have three wins.

The winners have been as follows:

Year	Men	Time	Women	Time
1973	Joss Naylor	2:08:20		
1974	Mike Short	2:10:27		
1975	Mike Short	2:05:38		
1976	Mike Short	2:08:28		
1977	Andy Styan	1:55:03	Anne Bland and Brenda Robinson	0:54:57^{[Note 1]}
1978	Billy Bland	2:07:00	Bridget Hogge	3:13:00
1979	Andy Styan	2:01:00	Ros Coats	2:37:57
1980	Billy Bland	2:05:24	Pauline Haworth	2:55:19
1981	Billy Bland	2:02:56	Pauline Haworth	
1982	Kenny Stuart	1:36:50^{[Note 2]}		
1983	Not held			
1984	Billy Bland	2:06:46	Pauline Haworth	2:40:14
1985	Jack Maitland	2:00:31	Angela Carson	2:34:28
1986	Bob Whitfield	1:58:59	Carol Haigh	2:34:38
1987	Billy Bland	2:00:04	Clare Crofts	2:29:58
1988	Bob Whitfield	2:06:10	Ruth Pickvance	2:42:40
1989	Bob Whitfield	1:59:03	Ruth Pickvance	2:40:12
1990	Gavin Bland	2:05:04	Wendy Dodds	2:37:30
1991	Mark Croasdale	1:58:11	Cheryl Cook	2:35:10
1992	Ian Ferguson	1:58:18	Helene Diamantides	2:23:25
1993	Gavin Bland	1:57:29	Ruth Pickvance	2:38:40
1994	Gavin Bland	1:58:48	Yvette Hague	2:33:25
1995	Ian Holmes	2:02:50	Nicola Davies	2:33:54
1996	Ian Holmes	2:09:09	Menna Angharad	2:38:09
1997	Gavin Bland	1:56:13	Yvette Hague	2:32:42
1998	Jonny Bland	2:02:30	Emma Moody	2:54:02
1999	Jonny Bland	2:12:41	Helene Diamantides	2:25:07
2000	Mark Rigby	2:15:30	Wendy Dodds	3:02:14
2001	Cancelled due to foot-and-mouth outbreak			
2002	Jonny Bland	2:13:42	Emma O'Shea	2:54:17
2003	Gavin Bland	2:04:24	Angela Mudge	2:35:07
2004	Nick Sharp	2:07:57	Kate Beaty	2:41:57
2005	Rob Hope	2:08:47	Christine Howard	2:37:55
2006	Nick Fish	2:10:43	Hazel Jones	2:44:09
2007	Ben Abdelnoor	2:14:08	Jackie Lee	2:39:26
2008	Rob Jebb	2:05:07	Jane Reedy	2:36:46
2009	Simon Booth	2:05:02	Jane Reedy	2:33:14
2010	Oliver Johnson	2:07:57	Helen Fines	2:32:53
2011	Carl Bell	2:09:13	Hazel Robinson	2:36:57
2012	Ben Abdelnoor	2:13:14	Suzanna Brett	2:56:31
2013	Ben Abdelnoor	2:07:00	Jasmin Paris	2:26:27
2014	Rhys Findlay-Robinson	2:16:00	Judith Jepson	2:44:16
2015	Sam Tosh	2:11:57	Jasmin Paris	2:26:37
2016	Sam Tosh	1:59:51	Victoria Wilkinson	2:22:50
2017	Carl Bell	2:13:14	Kelli Roberts	2:44:09
2018	Rhys Findlay-Robinson	2:25:23	Kelli Roberts	2:51:27
2019	Finlay Wild	2:00:51	Kelli Roberts	2:32:22
2020	Cancelled due to the COVID-19 pandemic			
2021	Matthew Atkinson	2:15:16	Tessa Strain	2:54:57
2022	Matthew Elkington	2:02:18	Nichola Jackson	2:24:39
2023	Tom Simpson	2:13:47	Louise Mitchell	2:51:33
2024	Finlay Wild	2:06:48	Nichola Jackson	2:36:52
2025	Finlay Wild	2:00:33	Bryony Halcrow	2:38:20
2026	Sam Bentham	2:05:08	Jasmin Paris	2:44:41

Note 1: Pike of Blisco route.

Note 2: Scafell Pike route.
