= Joss Naylor =

British fell runner (1936–2024)

Joss Naylor MBE
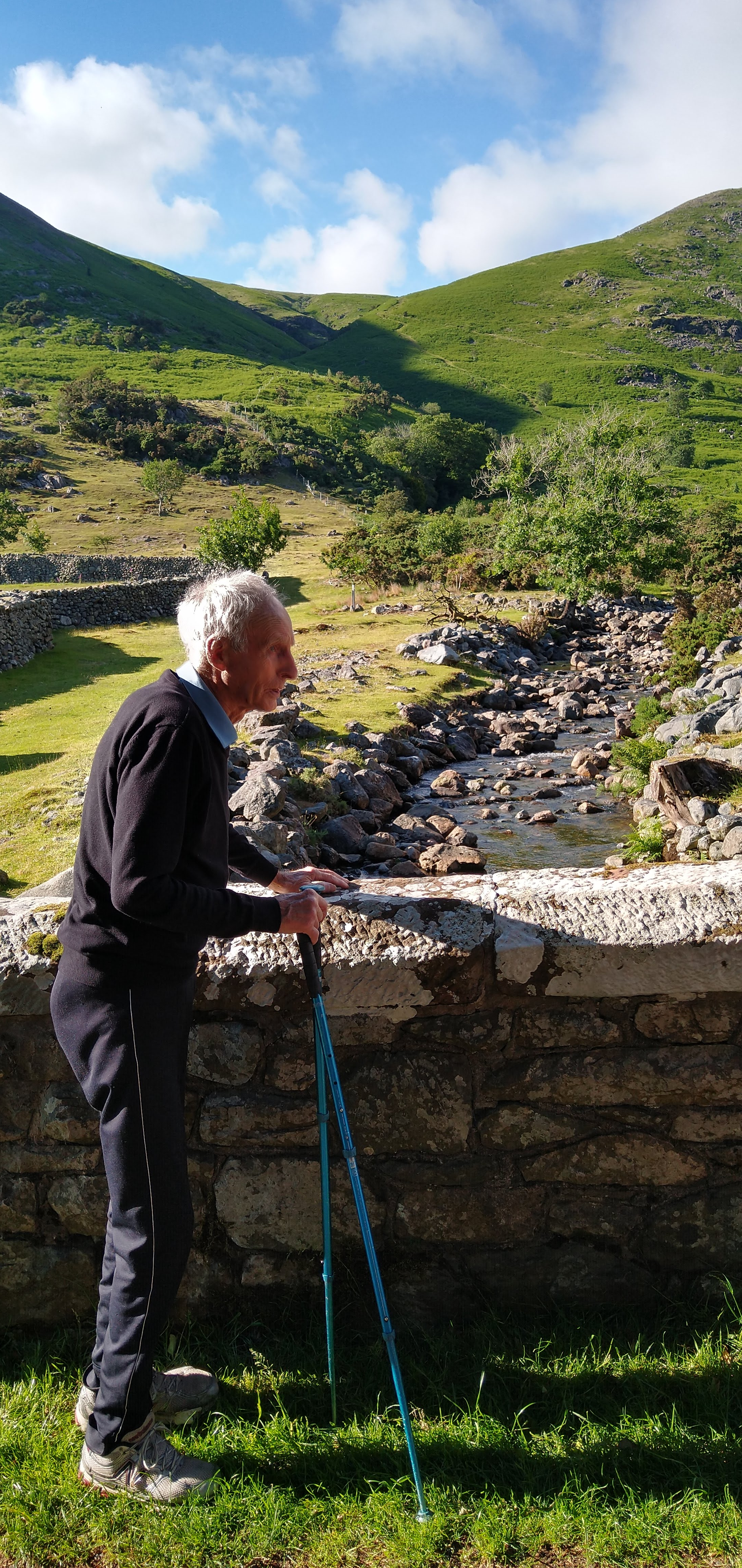
- Joss Naylor at Greendale Bridge waiting for finishers of his challenge in June 2021

Personal information
- Born: Joseph Naylor; 10 February 1936 Wasdale Head, England
- Died: 28 June 2024 (aged 88) Gosforth, Cumbria, England
- Occupation: Farmer
- Spouse: Mary Downie (m. 1963)
- Children: 3

Sport
- Sport: Fell running

Joseph Naylor MBE (10 February 1936 – 28 June 2024) was an English fell runner who set many long-distance records, and a sheep farmer, living in the Lake District. He became known as the "King of the Fells" or simply the "Iron Man".

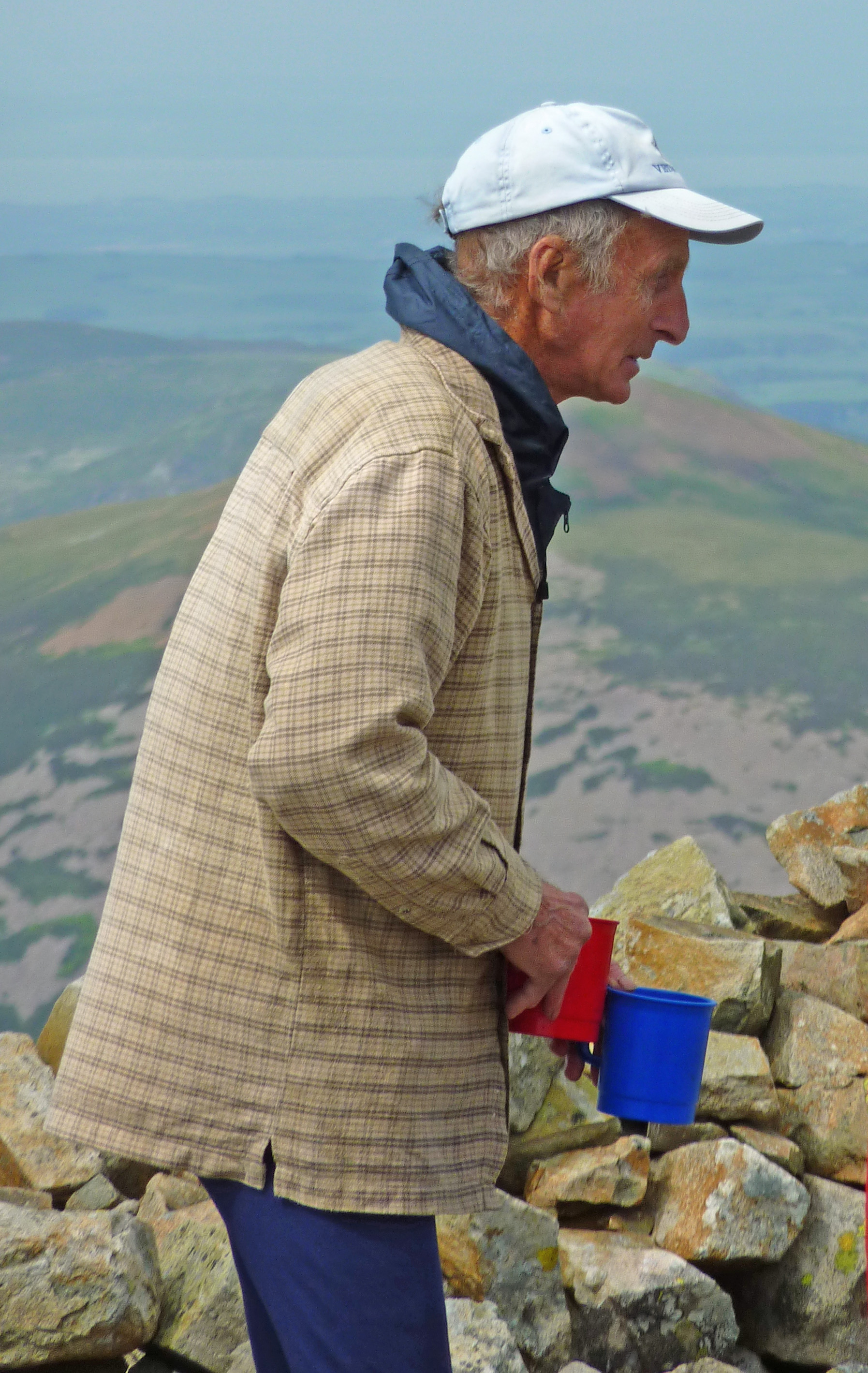
Joss Naylor providing water to fell runners - Ennerdale Horseshoe Fell Race June 2010

== Early life and education ==
Joseph Naylor was born in 1936 in Middle Row Farm, Wasdale Head, and attended school in Gosforth, Cumbria, leaving at 15 to work on the family farm.

== Career ==
Injuries in his youth led to operations aged 19 to remove cartilage from his right knee and aged 22 to remove two discs from his back. He took up running in 1960 aged 24, winning his first race, the Mountain Trial, in 1966. In 1971, he completed the Bob Graham Round, only the sixth person to do so, and continued to win races and set records through the 1970s and 1980s.

In 1978, following medical advice that his back was deteriorating, he reduced his farming activities (selling his cattle but retaining his sheep), and took a job training apprentices at Windscale. In his seventies, he started spending winters in Spain, as cold weather caused circulation problems in his legs.

=== Fell-running achievements ===
His fell running achievements included successive peak bagging records within the scope of the Bob Graham Round:

- 1971: 61 peaks in 23h37m
- 1972: 63 peaks in 23h35m
- 1975: 72 peaks, claimed to involve over 100 miles and about 38,000 feet of ascent in 23h20m (record stood until 1988)

His other fell running achievements included:

- 1971: The National Three Peaks Challenge (Ben Nevis, Scafell Pike and Snowdon): 11 hours 54 minutes including driving time
- 1973: The Welsh 3000s – the 14 peaks of Snowdonia in 4 hours 46 minutes (record stood until 1988)
- 1974: The Pennine Way: 3 days, 4 hours, 36 minutes (record stood until 1975)
- 1976: Robin Hood Bay to St Bees: 41 hours
- 1979: The Lyke Wake Walk: 4 hours 53 minutes (set during the annual race) (record stood until 1981)
- 1983: The Lakes, Meres and Waters circuit of 105 miles: 19 hours 20 minutes
- 1986: (age 50) completed the Wainwrights in 7 days, 1 hour, 25 minutes (record stood until 2014)
- 1996: (age 60) ran 60 Lakeland fell tops in 36 hours
- 2006: (age 70) ran 70 Lakeland fell tops, covering more than 50 miles and ascending more than 25,000 feet, in under 21 hours.

== Personal life and death ==
Naylor married Mary Downie in 1963, and they had three children.

After a period of ill health, including a stroke, Naylor died at a care home in Gosforth, Cumbria, on 28 June 2024, at the age of 88.

== Legacy, awards and honours ==
Naylor considered the 72 peak Lakeland circuit as his own greatest achievement, setting a record which stood for 13 years. He was appointed a Member of the British Empire (MBE) in the 1976 Birthday Honours for services to fell running, and was included as one of Britain’s top 100 sports personalities in the 2007 book Best of British: Hendo’s Sporting Heroes, by sports journalist Jon Henderson. Co-founder of the London Marathon and Olympic Gold medal winner Chris Brasher described Joss Naylor as 'The Greatest of Them All', a title he bestowed on Joss when he ran 72 Lake District mountains in 24 hours.

Naylor completed some of his achievements in extreme weather conditions (the 1972 63 peaks record in a severe storm, and the 1975 72 peaks record and large sections of the 1986 Wainwrights record in a heat wave), and he was noted for his ability to persevere despite pain and adversity. He was also noted for his humility and his generosity towards less talented runners, and in keeping with British fell-running traditions, he frequently provided support or pacing for other runners attempting the same or similar challenges. However, on occasion he was less enthusiastic about runners who differ from his approach by setting records only in optimum conditions or who use more scientific methods such as use of spreadsheets for planning attempts.

He created his own fell-running challenge, the Joss Naylor Lakeland Challenge, open to over-fifties only. This runs 48 miles (77 km) from Pooley Bridge to Greendale Bridge, traversing 30 summits, with climbing of 17,000 feet (5182 m).

Naylor was the subject of a biography by Keith Richardson, and his fell running exploits are covered in detail in Steve Chilton's It's a hill, get over it: fell running's history and characters and in Richard Askwith's Feet in the Clouds.
