= Stob Ghabhar =

Scottish mountain in Black Mount range

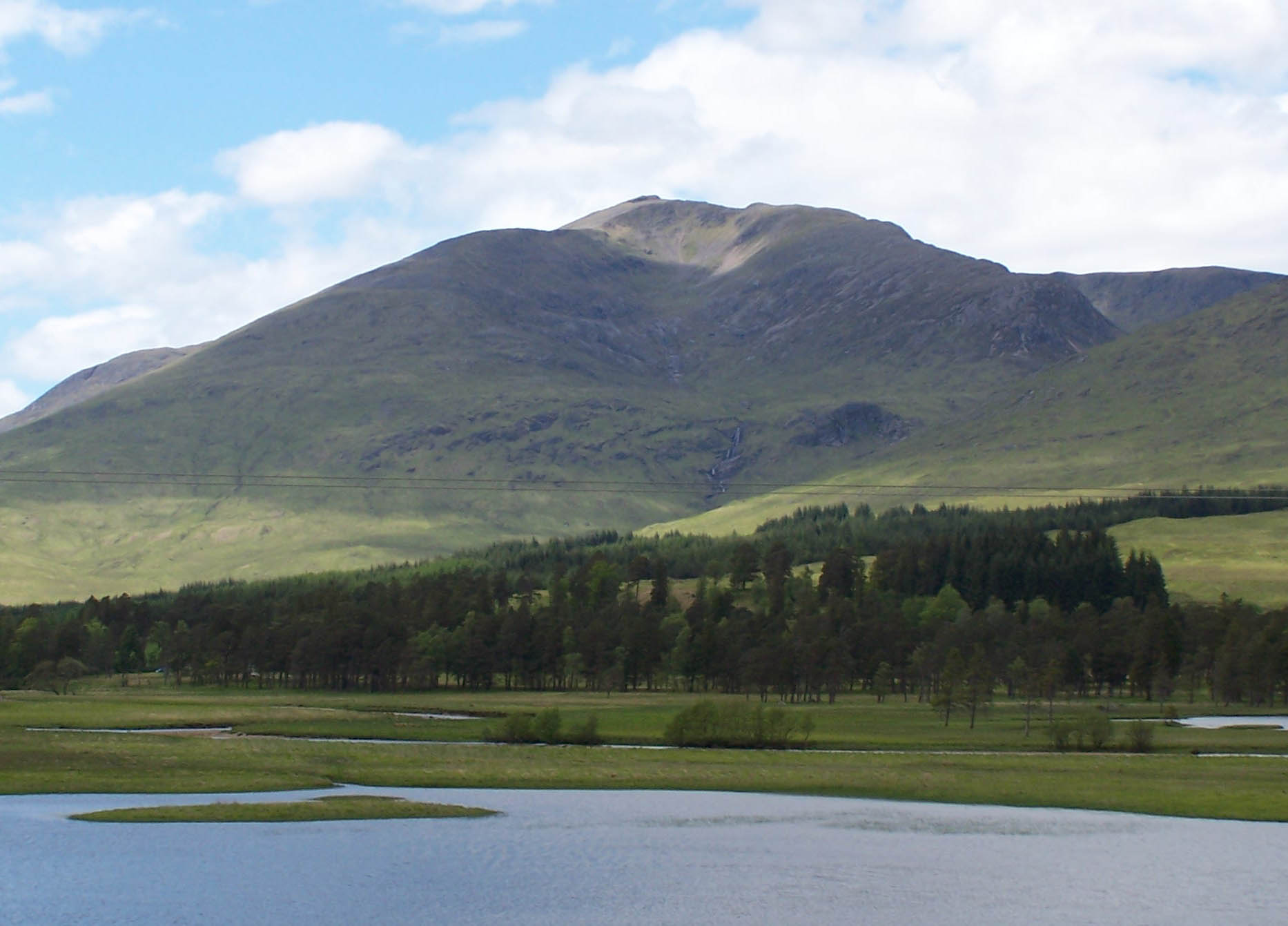
- Stob Ghabhar seen from the south east across Loch Tulla.

Highest point
- Elevation: 1,089.2 m (3,573 ft)
- Prominence: 392 m (1,286 ft)
- Listing: Munro, Marilyn
- Coordinates: 56°34′05″N 4°52′56″W

Naming
- English translation: goats' peak
- Language of name: Gaelic
- Pronunciation: Scottish Gaelic: [ˈs̪t̪op ˈɣavəɾ] English approximation: stop-GAV-ər

Geography
- Location: Argyll & Highland, Scotland
- Parent range: Grampians
- OS grid: NN230454
- Topo map: OS Landranger 50, OS Explorer 377

Listed summits of Stob Ghabhar
Name	Grid ref	Height	Status
Aonach Eagach	NN236454	991 m (3251 ft)	Munro Top
Sròn a’ Ghearrain	NN221457	990 m (3248 ft)	Munro Top
Sròn nan Giubhas	NN231462	976 m (3202 ft)	Munro Top
Stob a’ Bhruaich Leith	NN208459	941 m (3087 ft)	Munro Top

Stob Ghabhar is a mountain in the Scottish Highlands, part of the Black Mount group. It is a Munro with a height of 1,089.2 metres (3,573 ft). Stob Ghabhar lies nine kilometres (5 1/2 miles) northwest of Bridge of Orchy and stands on the border of the Argyll and Highland council areas.

== Overview ==
Stob Ghabhar is well seen from the east and is a familiar sight to motorists on the A82 road as it skirts the western edge of Rannoch Moor. The mountains eastern corries formed by the headwaters of the River Ba look impressive from this direction as does the neighbouring mountain of Stob a' Choire Odhair with which Stob Ghabhar is usually climbed. It reaches a height of 1,089.2 metres (3,573 ft) and qualifies as a Munro and a Marilyn.

The mountain's name translates from Scottish Gaelic as "goats' peak". Goats were often encouraged by shepherds on mountains with precipitous cliffs such as Stob Ghabhar to keep sheep away from the steep drops.

== Geography ==
Stob Ghabhar is regarded as the finest of the four Munros of the Black Mount (the others being Stob a' Choire Odhair, Creise and Meall a' Bhuiridh), it is a large and impressive mountain with long ridges radiating from it prominent pointed summit and deep scalloped corries on its flanks. The three main ridges go east, west and north west from the highest point and have on them four lesser peaks which are listed as “tops” in the Munro Tables. The east ridge goes over the subsidiary “top” of Aonach Eagach (991 metres) before continuing to the adjoining Munro of Stob a' Choire Odhair. The western ridge is initially narrow as it traverses the crest of two opposing corries before reaching the “top” of Sròn a' Ghearrain (990 m or 3,250 ft) after one kilometre (5/8 mi). Stob a' Bhruaich Leith (941 m or 3,087 ft lies 1.5 km (1 mi) further along the ridge which then drops down gradually towards Glen Etive. The fourth Munro Top Sròn nan Giubhas (976 m or 3,202 ft) lies 700 m (2,300 ft) north of the main summit along a ridge which then swings north west and descends for five kilometres to Glen Etive.

Stob Ghabhar's other notable geographical features are its corries and cliffs. Coire Dhearbhadh which stands on the mountain's eastern flank is ringed by sheer cliffs and contains the small lochan, Coirein Lochain. The steep headwall of this corrie contains the upper couloir, a deep gully which provides a tough scrambling route to the summit in summer and a classic ice route in winter which was first climbed in 1897. The summit stands on the edge of the cliffs overlooking the corrie.

Two other large corries stand to the west of the summit, Coire a’ Chaolain on the northern side of the west ridge and Coire Ghabhar on the southern side, these two corries almost touch and make the ridge quite narrow. Drainage from the mountain finds its way to both the east and west coasts of Scotland, the northern slopes drain via the River Etive and Loch Etive to the west coast near Oban. Water from the southern slopes goes to the same place but progresses by Glen Orchy and Loch Awe while the eastern slopes drain via Loch Rannoch and the River Tay to the east coast at the Firth of Tay. The whole of the Black Mount range is noted for the complexity of its geology, there is a junction of gneiss and Cruachan granite near the summit of Stob Ghabhar.

== Duncan Ban MacIntyre ==
Duncan Ban MacIntyre (1724–1812) one of Scotlands greatest poets in the Gaelic tradition was born in the southern foothills of Stob Ghabhar at the croft of Druim Liaghart near Victoria Bridge. MacIntyre, whose birthplace is marked by a plinth, worked as a forester and gamekeeper in the area until 1767 when he moved to Edinburgh. Much of his poetry was concerned with the flora, fauna and mountains of the area.

== Ascents ==
As mentioned the ascent of Stob Ghabhar is usually combined with the adjoining Munro of Stob a' Choir' Odhar and the starting point for this walk is the car park at Victoria Bridge at the western end of Loch Tulla at grid reference NN269419. The West Highland Way is followed for a short distance until a track is taken west along the north bank of the Abhainn Shira as far as the Clashgour hut which belongs to the Glasgow University Mountaineering Club but prior to 1933 was the local primary school. At the hut turn right (north) by the Allt Toaig for two kilometres before ascending onto the Aonach Eagach ridge which leads to the summit.

Stob Ghabhar can be climbed as part of the complete traverse of the Black Mount range. This classic walk is a long hard journey of 25 km (16 mi) between the Kings House Hotel at the eastern end of Glen Coe and the Inveroran Hotel near Bridge of Orchy, it has 1,700 m (5,600 ft) of vertical ascent and never drops below the 730 m (2,400 ft) contour. Transport is consequently difficult. The highlight of the view from the summit is a prospect of Rannoch Moor to the east while the Glen Coe and Etive mountains are visible to the north and west.

== References and footnotes ==
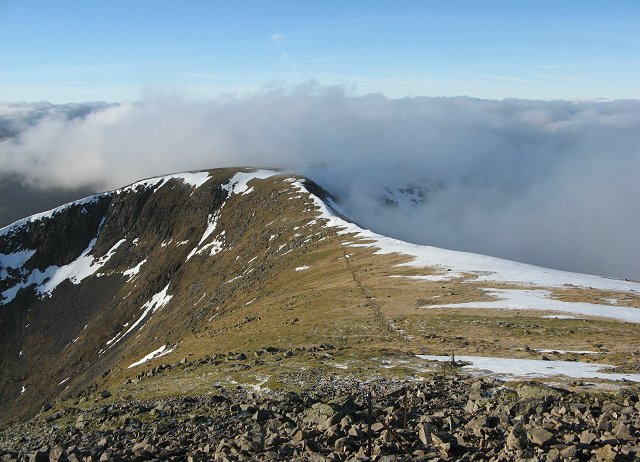
The view along the ridge, towards Sròn a' Ghearrain

- The Munros, Scottish Mountaineering Trust, 1986, Donald Bennett (Editor) ISBN 0-907521-13-4
- The High Mountains of Britain and Ireland, Diadem, 1993, Irvine Butterfield, ISBN 0-906371-30-9
- 100 Best Routes on Scottish Mountains, Warner Books, 1992, Ralph Storer, ISBN 0-7515-0300-2
- Hamish’s Mountain Walk, Baton Wicks, 1996, Hamish Brown, ISBN 1-898573-08-5
- The Munros, Scotland’s Highest Mountains, 2006, Cameron McNeish, ISBN 1-84204-082-0
- The Central Highlands, 1995, Peter Hodgkiss, ISBN 0-907521-44-4

Footnotes
