= Loch Buidhe (Rannoch Moor) =

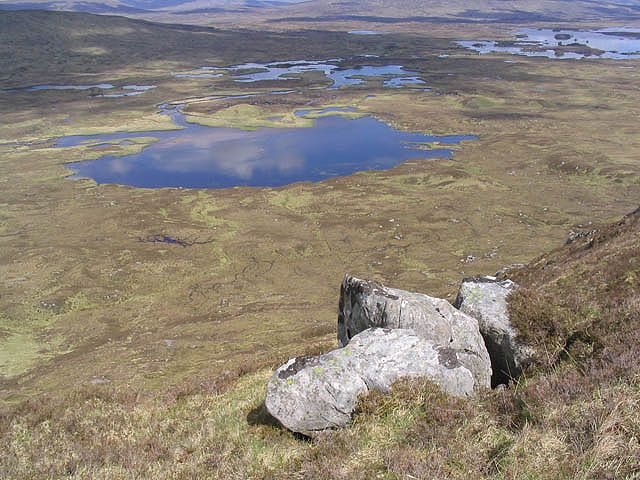
- View of Loch Buidhe, from Meall Beag

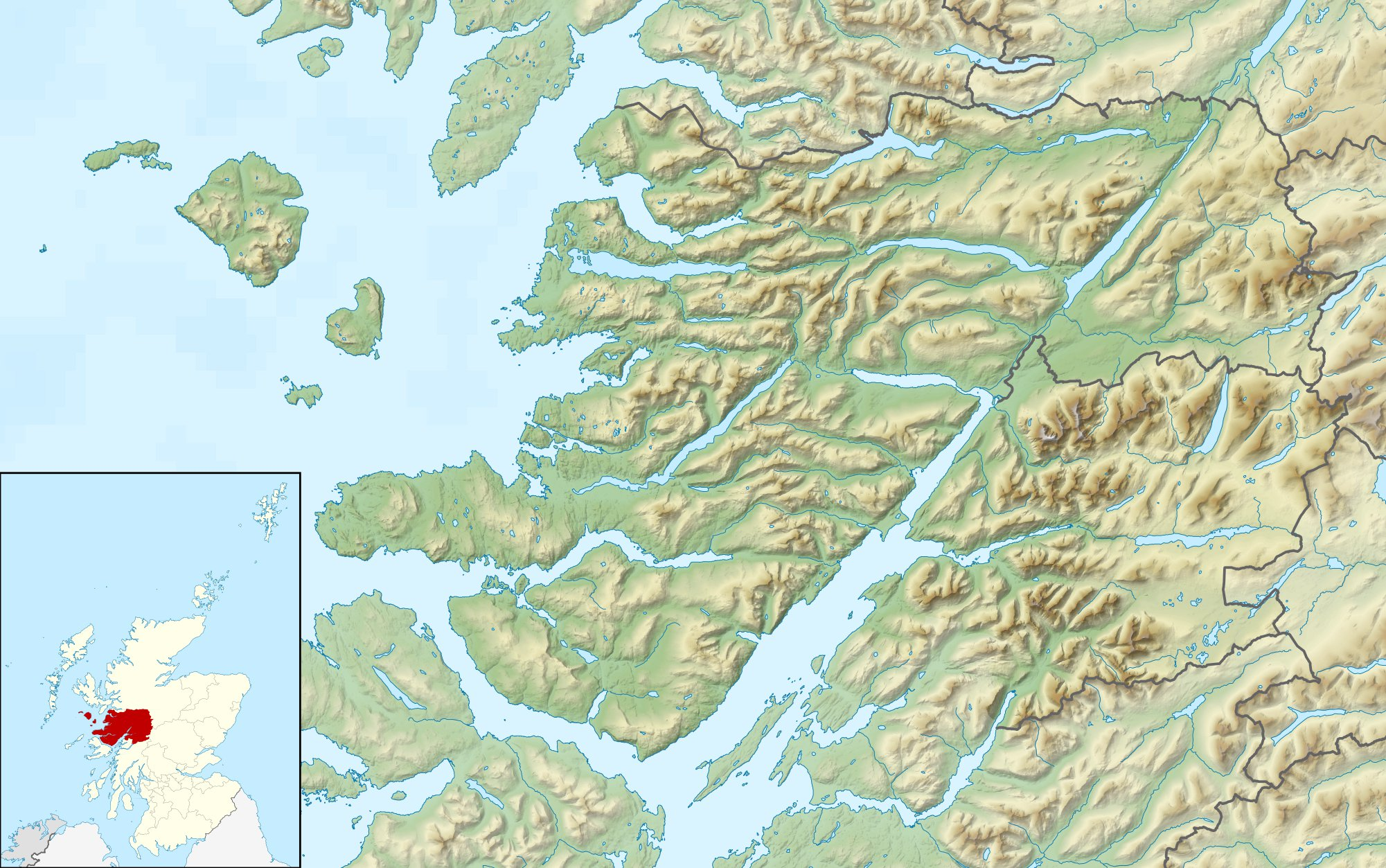
- Location within Lochaber
- Location: grid reference NN297483
- Coordinates: 56.595°N 4.775°W
- Type: freshwater loch
- Primary inflows: River Bà
- Primary outflows: River Forth
- Max. length: 0.48 km (0.30 mi)
- Max. width: 0.40 km (0.25 mi)
- Surface area: 14.8 ha (37 acres)
- Average depth: 2 ft (0.61 m)
- Max. depth: 3 ft (0.91 m)
- Shore length^{1}: 3.2 km (2.0 mi)
- Surface elevation: 298 m (978 ft)
- Settlements: Bridge of Orchy
- ^{1} Shore length is not a well-defined measure.

Loch Buidhe is a fresh water loch on Rannoch Moor, Argyll and Bute within Highland council area, Scotland.

It is situated about 9 km (6 mi) north of Bridge of Orchy. It lies to the south of Lochan na Stainge, and to the west of Lochan na h-Achlaise. The A82 road crosses Rannoch Moor to the west of the loch, while the West Highland Way long-distance path passes by to the west. The name is Gaelic for yellow loch.
