= Ben Nevis and Glen Coe National Scenic Area =

National scenic area in Scotland

Coordinates: 56.6°N 5.0°W

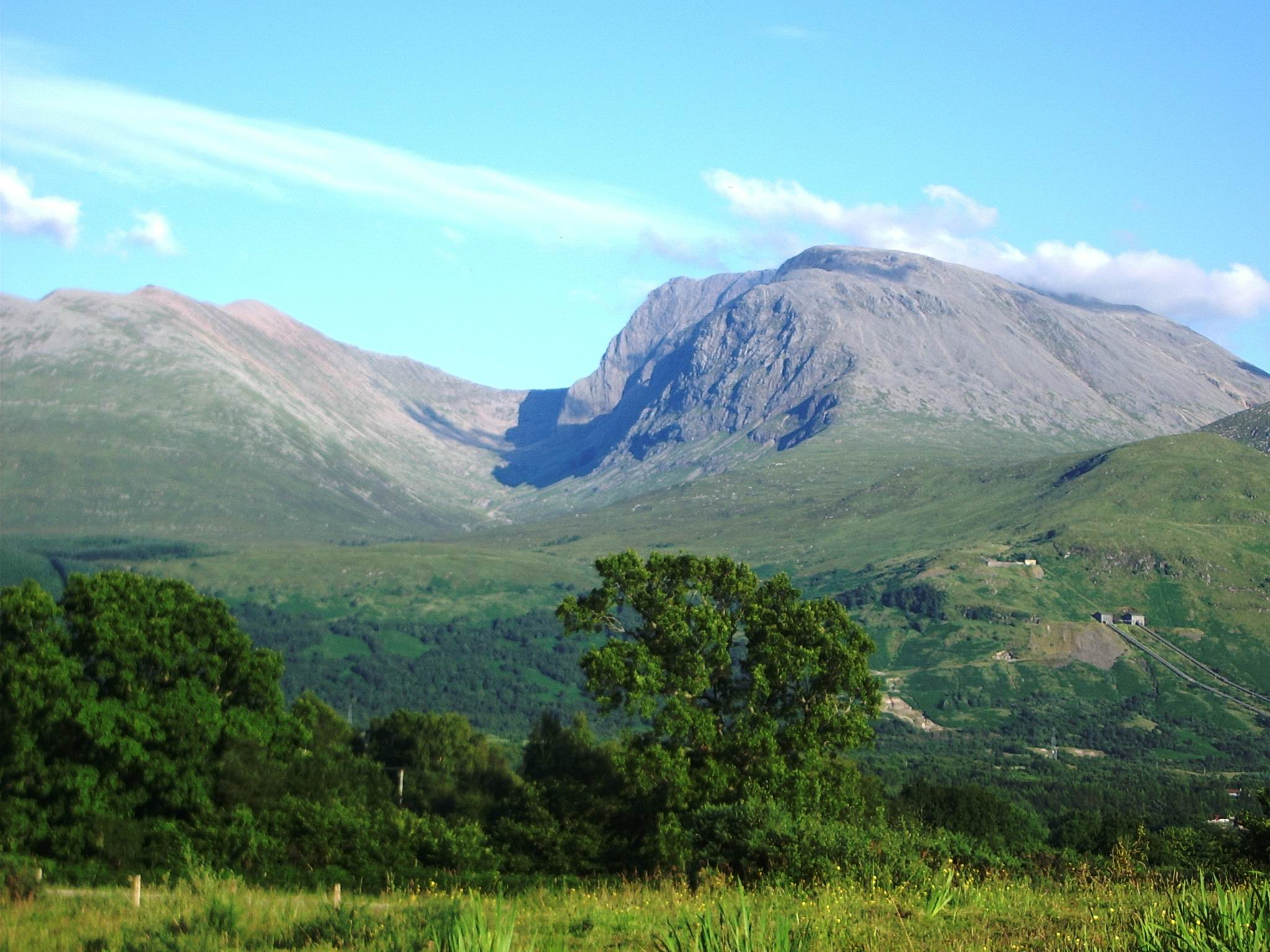
- Ben Nevis from Banavie.

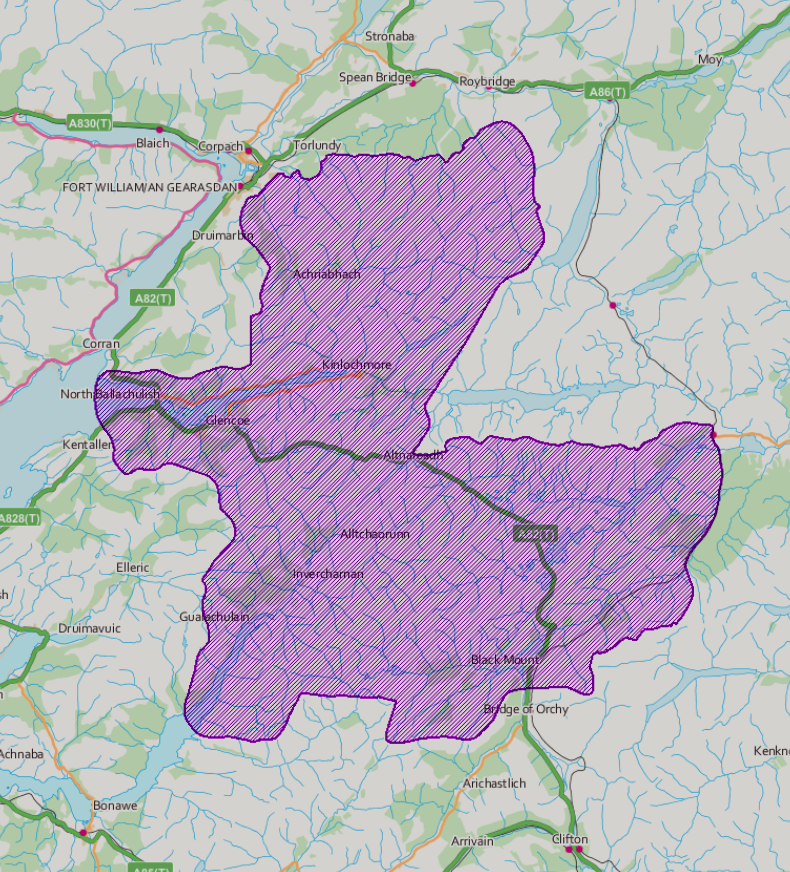
- Location: Scotland (Highland, Argyll and Bute and Perth and Kinross)
- Area: 922.7 km^{2} (356.3 sq mi)
- Established: 1981
- Governing body: NatureScot

Ben Nevis and Glen Coe is a national scenic area (NSA) covering part of the Highlands of Scotland surrounding Ben Nevis and Glen Coe, in which certain forms of development are restricted. It is one of 40 such areas in Scotland, which are defined so as to identify areas of exceptional scenery and to ensure their protection from inappropriate development. The Ben Nevis and Glen Coe NSA covers 903 km^{2} (349 sq mi) of land, lying within the Highland, Argyll and Bute and Perth and Kinross council areas. A further 19 km^{2} (7.3 sq mi) of the NSA are marine, covering the sea loch of Loch Leven.

National scenic areas are primarily designated due to the scenic qualities of an area; however NSAs may well have other special qualities, for example related to culture, history, archaeology, geology or wildlife. Areas with such qualities may be protected via other national and international designations that overlap with the NSA designation. Glen Coe is designated as a national nature reserve, and there are several Special Areas of Conservation and Special Protection Areas within the NSA. Although the national scenic area designation provides a degree of additional protection via the planning process, there are no bodies equivalent to a national park authority, and whilst local authorities can produce a management strategy for each one, only the three national scenic areas within Dumfries and Galloway have current management strategies.

== Creation of the national scenic area ==
The idea that areas of wild or remote character such as Ben Nevis and Glen Coe should be designated to protect the scenic qualities of their landscapes grew in popularity throughout the nineteenth and early twentieth centuries. In 1931 a commission headed by Christopher Addison first proposed the creation of a national park in Scotland. Following the Second World War a committee chaired by Sir Douglas Ramsay to consider the issue proposed that five areas should receive a level of protection: Glen Coe-Ben Nevis-Black Mount was one of the areas listed. In 1951, the area became one of five designated "national park direction areas", in which planning decisions taken by local authorities could be reviewed by central government under certain circumstances.

A 1974 report by the Countryside Commission for Scotland (CCS) entitled A Park System for Scotland recommended that the Glen Coe-Ben Nevis-Black Mount area should be designated as one of four proposed "Special Parks", considering the area of national importance due to its natural beauty and amenity value, however this recommendation was not acted on. Following a further review of landscape protection in 1978, it was suggested that additional areas, alongside the existing direction areas should receive protection, and in 1981 the direction areas were thus replaced by the 40 national scenic areas, which were based on the 1978 recommendations, and included the Ben Nevis and Glen Coe area.

A further report into protection of the landscape of Scotland was published by the CCS in 1990. Entitled The Mountain Areas of Scotland - Conservation and Management, it recommended that four areas were under such pressure that they ought to be designated as national parks, each with an independent planning board, in order to retain their heritage value. The four areas identified were similar to those proposed by the Ramsay Committee, and included Glen Coe-Ben Nevis-Black Mount. The government did not however choose to establish national parks and so the status of the Ben Nevis and Glen Coe area was not altered. Following the passage of the National Parks (Scotland) Act 2000, national parks were established in the Cairngorms and Loch Lomond and The Trossachs, two of the areas identified by the Ramsay committee, however the status of the other three Ramsay areas, including Ben Nevis and Glen Coe, was again not altered. In 2013 the Scottish Campaign for National Parks proposed seven areas deemed suitable for national park status, one of which was the Ben Nevis and Glen Coe area.

== Landscape and scenery ==
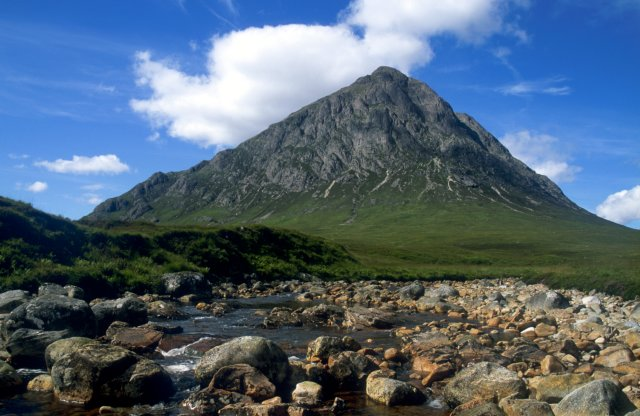
Buachaille Etive Mòr lies close to the head of both Glen Coe and Glen Etive, on the edge of Rannoch Moor.

Although named after Ben Nevis and Glen Coe, the national scenic area covers a much wider area of land, as detailed below. Much of the northern part of the NSA lies within the Lochaber region.

=== Glen Nevis ===
Glen Nevis (Scottish Gaelic: Gleann Nibheis) lies in the north of the national scenic area, and runs south from Fort William. It is bordered to the south by the Mamore range, and to the north by the highest mountains in the British Isles: Ben Nevis (Scotland's highest mountain), Càrn Mor Dearg, Aonach Mòr, and Aonach Beag. It is home to the second highest waterfall in Scotland, Steall Falls. Below the waterfall is a steeply walled and impressive gorge.

=== Mamores ===
The Mamores form an east–west ridge approximately fifteen kilometres in length lying between Glen Nevis to the north and Loch Leven to the south. Ten of the ranges are classified as Munros. The hills can be accessed from both Glen Nevis and the former aluminium smelting town of Kinlochleven.

=== Glen Coe ===
Glen Coe (Scottish Gaelic: Gleann Comhann) is a glen of volcanic origins, in the heart of the national scenic area. A review of the national scenic areas by Scottish Natural Heritage in 2010 made reference to the "soaring, dramatic splendour of Glen Coe", and "the suddenness of the transition between high mountain pass and the lightly wooded strath" in the lower glen. It also described the journey through the glen on the main A82 road as "one of the classic Highland journeys". The main settlement is the village of Glencoe located at the foot of the glen. The glen is regarded as the home of Scottish mountaineering and is popular with hillwalkers and climbers.

=== Glen Etive ===
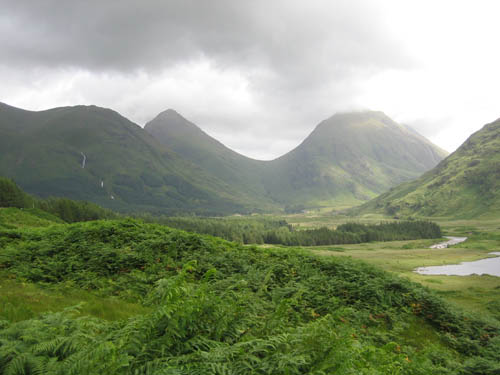
Glen Etive

Glen Etive (Scottish Gaelic: Gleann Èite) lies to the south of Glen Coe. The River Etive (Scottish Gaelic: Abhainn Èite) rises on the peaks surrounding Rannoch Moor, with several tributary streams coming together at the Kings House Hotel. From the Kings House, the Etive flows for about 18 km, reaching the sea loch, Loch Etive. The river and its tributaries are popular with whitewater kayakers and at high water levels it is a test piece of the area and a classic run. Glen Etive has been used as the backdrop to many movies, among them Braveheart and Skyfall.

=== The Black Mount ===
The Black Mount is situated between Glen Orchy and Glen Coe, to the east of Glen Etive, forming the southernmost part of the national scenic area. Its four Munros are Stob Ghabhar, Stob a' Choire Odhair, Creise and Meall a' Bhuiridh. The hills of Ben Inverveigh and Meall Tairbh are located between Black Mount and the Bridge of Orchy. The Black Mount Deer Forest includes moorland, the mountain, as well as several rivers, burns, lochs, and tarns.

=== Rannoch Moor ===
Much of the western part of Rannoch Moor (Scottish Gaelic: Mòinteach Raineach/Raithneach), an expanse of around 50 square miles (130 km^{2}) of boggy moorland to the west of Loch Rannoch in Scotland, is included in the national scenic area. The A82 road crosses western Rannoch Moor on its way to Glen Coe and Fort William, as does the West Highland Line, which reaches Fort William via Glen Spean rather than Glen Coe. When the line was built across the moor, its builders had to float the tracks on a mattress of tree roots, brushwood and thousands of tons of earth and ashes. Corrour railway station, the UK's highest, and one of its most remote being 10 miles (16 km) from the nearest public road, is located on this section of the line at 1,339 feet (408 m). The line takes gentle curves totalling 23 miles (37 km) across the moorland.

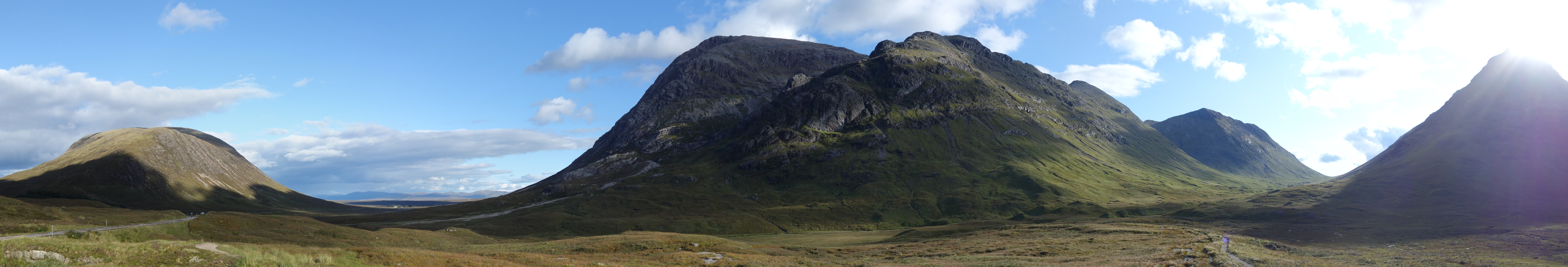
A southeastern look from the A82 at the entrance of Glen Coe, showing Buachaille Etive Mòr in the center and, to its left in the distance, Kings House Hotel and Rannoch Moor.

== Conservation designations ==
A number of other conservation designation are defined within or overlapping with the NSA: Glen Coe is designated as a both national nature reserve (NNR), and a Special Area of Conservation (SAC) due to wide variety of montane habitats found within the glen. Glen Coe, along with most of the southwestern portion of the NSA including Glen Etive and the Black Mount, forms part of the Glen Etive and Glen Fyne Special Protection Area (SPA), which is protected due to its breeding population of golden eagles.

Rannoch Moor is also designated as an SAC, and is particularly famous as being the sole British location for the Rannoch-rush, named after the moor. It also has populations of otters and freshwater pearl mussels. The River Tay rises on the moor within the NSA, and is designated as a separate SAC for its entire length. The Ben Nevis massif is also an SAC, as are the woodlands at North Ballachulish in the westernmost part of the NSA. The final SAC within the NSA protects the woods on the western side of Loch Etive, in the southwestern extremity of the area.
