= Stob a' Choire Odhair =

Mountain in Scotland

Coordinates: 56°34′25″N 4°50′18″W

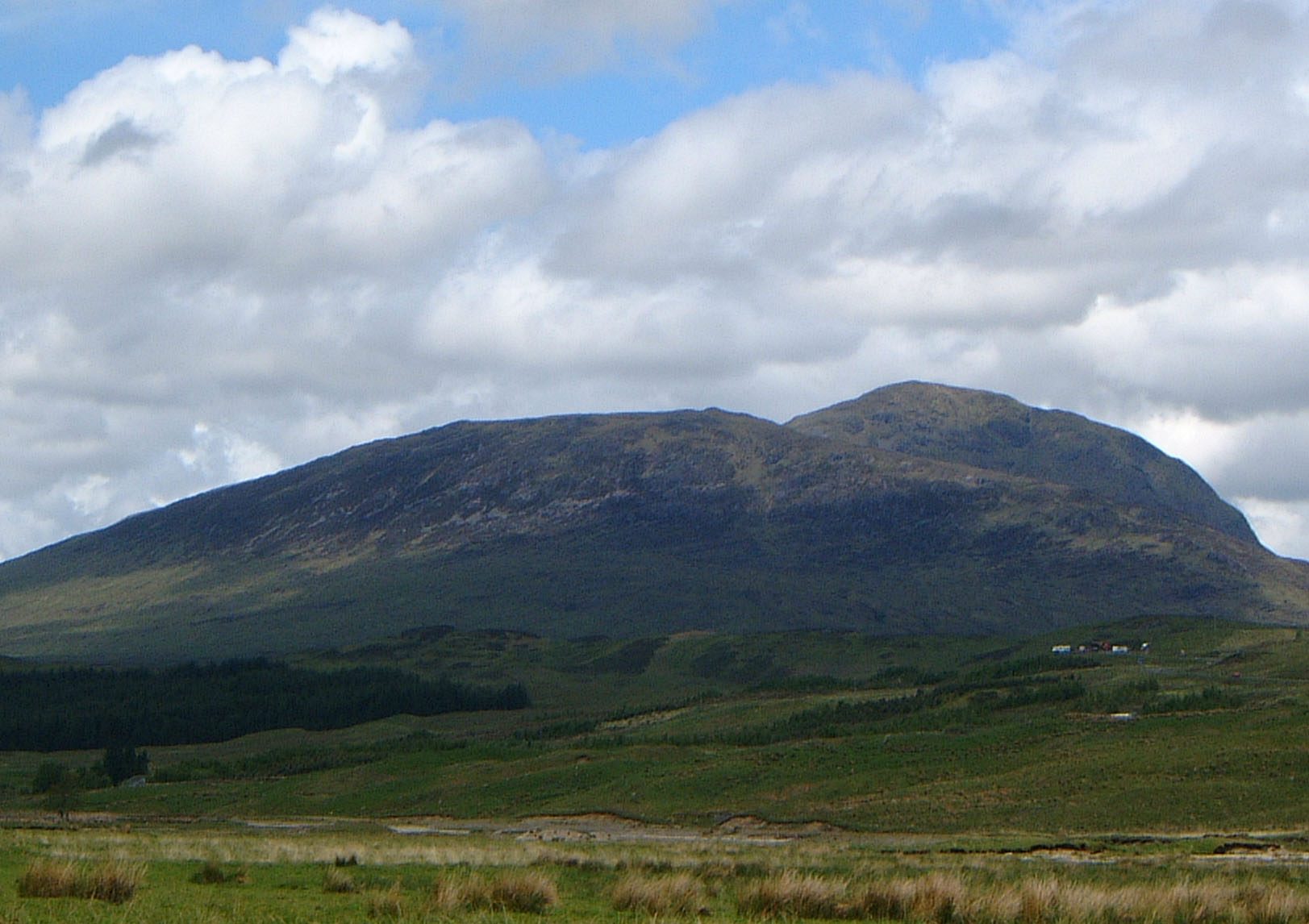
- Stob a' Choire Odhair seen from the SE. The slopes of Beinn Toaig are in front with the main summit behind.

Highest point
- Elevation: 945 meters (3,100 ft)
- Prominence: 279.4 m (917 ft)
- Listing: Munro, Marilyn

Naming
- English translation: Peak of the dun-coloured Corrie
- Language of name: Gaelic
- Pronunciation: Scottish Gaelic: [ˈs̪t̪op ə ˈxɔɾʲə ˈo.əɾ]

Geography
- Location: Argyll, Scotland
- Parent range: Grampians
- OS grid: NN257459
- Topo map: OS Landranger 50, OS Explorer 377

Stob a' Choire Odhair is a Scottish mountain situated eight kilometres north west of Bridge of Orchy on the border of the Argyll and Bute and Highland council areas.

== Overview ==
Stob a' Choire Odhair reaches a height of 945 metres (3,100 ft) and is classed as a Munro and a Marilyn. It is an unpretentious mountain that is overshadowed by its near neighbour Stob Ghabhar, one of the finest mountains in the southern Highlands. It stands in the Black Mount deer forest, an area that derives its name from the dark peat hags of the moorland that surround the mountain. Stob a' Choire Odhair along with Stob Ghabhar are well seen from the A82 road as it crosses the western end of Rannoch Moor and they are often climbed together and make a natural days walk. The hills name translates from the Gaelic as "Peak of the dun-coloured corrie".

== Geography ==
Stob a' Choire Odhair's summit stands at the meeting of three ridges. Its western ridge links to the Munro of Stob Ghabhar which lies three kilometres away via a col with a height of 668 metres. The north eastern ridge drops very steeply to the moorland of the Black mount and Rannoch Moor. The south eastern ridge links to the mountains subsidiary peak of Beinn Toaig (834 metres) via a col with a height of 802 metres. Beinn Toaig also has a long NE ridge which runs parallel to the one of Stob a' Choire Odhair. There are two corries either side of the 802-metre col, to the north is Coire Odhair while to the south of the col is Coire Toaig which has a very good stalkers track up it which leads directly to the main summit.

== Historic roads ==
The lower eastern slopes of Stob a' Choire Odhair carries two old roads which were important historical links to the north of Scotland. An old military road built by Major William Caulfeild was constructed in the early 1750s as part of the pacification of the Highlands after the 1745 Jacobite rising. Slightly further east is the line of an ancient drovers' road used to herd cattle to market, this road was improved by Thomas Telford in 1803 and carried the main road down Glen Coe to Fort William until 1933 when the present road was built further east. Telford's road now carries the route of the West Highland Way.

== Ascents ==
Stob a' Choire Odhair is usually climbed in conjunction with the adjacent Munro of Stob Ghabhar, the starting point for this walk is Victoria Bridge at the western end of Loch Tulla at grid reference NN269419. The direct route from here utilises the very good zig zag stalkers path up Coire Toaig directly to the summit. The ascent of the mountain can also be included in the Clachlet Traverse, a high level route from the Inveroran Hotel near Bridge of Orchy to the Kings House Hotel in Glen Coe. Despite having less height than its neighbour Stob Ghabhar it is the better viewpoint offering an extensive prospect across Rannoch Moor and the Bridge of Orchy Munros.

== References and footnotes ==
- The Munros, Scottish Mountaineering Trust, 1986, Donald Bennett (Editor) ISBN 0-907521-13-4
- The High Mountains of Britain and Ireland, Diadem, 1993, Irvine Butterfield, ISBN 0-906371-30-9
- Hamish's Mountain Walk, Baton Wicks, 1996, Hamish Brown, ISBN 1-898573-08-5
- The Munros, Scotland's Highest Mountains, 2006, Cameron McNeish, ISBN 1-84204-082-0

Footnotes
