= Creise =

Mountain in the Scottish Highlands

Coordinates: 56°36′52″N 4°52′20″W

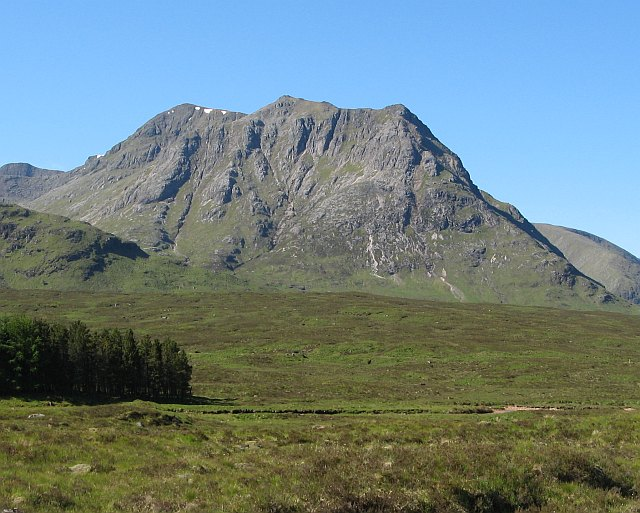
- Sròn na Crèise

Highest point
- Elevation: 1,100 m (3,600 ft)
- Prominence: 168 m (551 ft)
- Parent peak: Meall a' Bhuiridh
- Listing: Munro, Marilyn

Naming
- Language of name: Gaelic
- Pronunciation: Scottish Gaelic: [ˈkʰɾʲeʃə] English: /ˈkreɪʃ/ KRAYSH

Geography
- Location: Highland, Scotland
- Parent range: Grampians
- OS grid: NN238506
- Topo map: OS Landranger 50, 41 OS Explorer 384

Listed summits of Creise
Name	Grid ref	Height	Status
Clach Leathad	NN240493	1099 m (3605 ft)	Munro Top
Stob a’ Ghlais Choire	NN239516	996 m (3268 ft)	Munro Top

Creise (Scottish Gaelic: A' Chrèise) is a mountain summit in the Black Mount range, in the Scottish Highlands. It overlooks the northern end of Glen Etive and its height is 1,100 metres (3,600 ft). Creise is one of four Munros in the Black Mount, along with Meall a' Bhuiridh, Stob Ghabhar and Stob a' Choire Odhair. The mountain is a long and flattish ridge, whose highest point was unnamed until 1981. It is popular with cross-country skiers, being near the White Corries ski area from where it is often climbed along with adjoining Meall a' Bhuiridh. The steep and craggy northern buttress, Sròn na Crèise, is well seen from the A82 road and the Kings House Hotel.

== Name ==
The mountain is a long and flattish ridge. Until 1981, it seems the only named parts of the ridge were Sròn na Crèise and Stob a' Ghlais Choire at the northern end, and Clach Leathad (Clachlet) at the southern end. The highest point was apparently unnamed until then, being only one meter higher than Clach Leathad. It seems that the whole ridge was called by the plural Na Crèisean. The meaning is unclear. Irvine Butterfield says that crèis, meaning 'grease' or 'fat', refers to the rich grazing land around the mountain which was used in the past by Glen Coe herdsman to fatten their cattle.

== Landscape ==
Creise is a long whaleback of a mountain, oriented north to south. It has a three kilometre long summit ridge with four distinct high points. The most southerly is Clach Leathad (Clachlet) which with a height of 1099 metres is just a metre lower than the main summit. Up to the 1970s it was regarded as the highest point of the mountain. It was downgraded to a "Munro Top" in the 1981 edition of Munro's Tables. North of Clach Leathad along the ridge is Mam Coire Easain (1070 metres), a former "Munro Top" deleted from the tables in 1981. It stands at the head of the ridge linking the mountain to Meall a' Bhuiridh. The main summit stands a further north. It was previously an unnamed Munro Top on OS maps before being promoted to Munro in 1981.

A fourth high point is Stob a' Ghlais Choire (996 metres). This Munro Top stands at the northern end of the ridge above the crags of Sròn na Crèise which fall steeply to the valley of the River Etive. Sròn na Creise offers a challenging scrambler's route to the summit, but needs care in winter as several serious accidents have occurred on the crags.

Rainfall on Creise finds its way to both coasts of Scotland. Drainage from the south of the mountain (Clach Leathad) flows into Coire Ba, one of the biggest corries in Scotland, and arrives at the east coast at the Firth of Tay via the Rivers Ba, Tummel and Tay. All other drainage from the mountain is via Glen Etive and Loch Etive to the west coast near Oban.

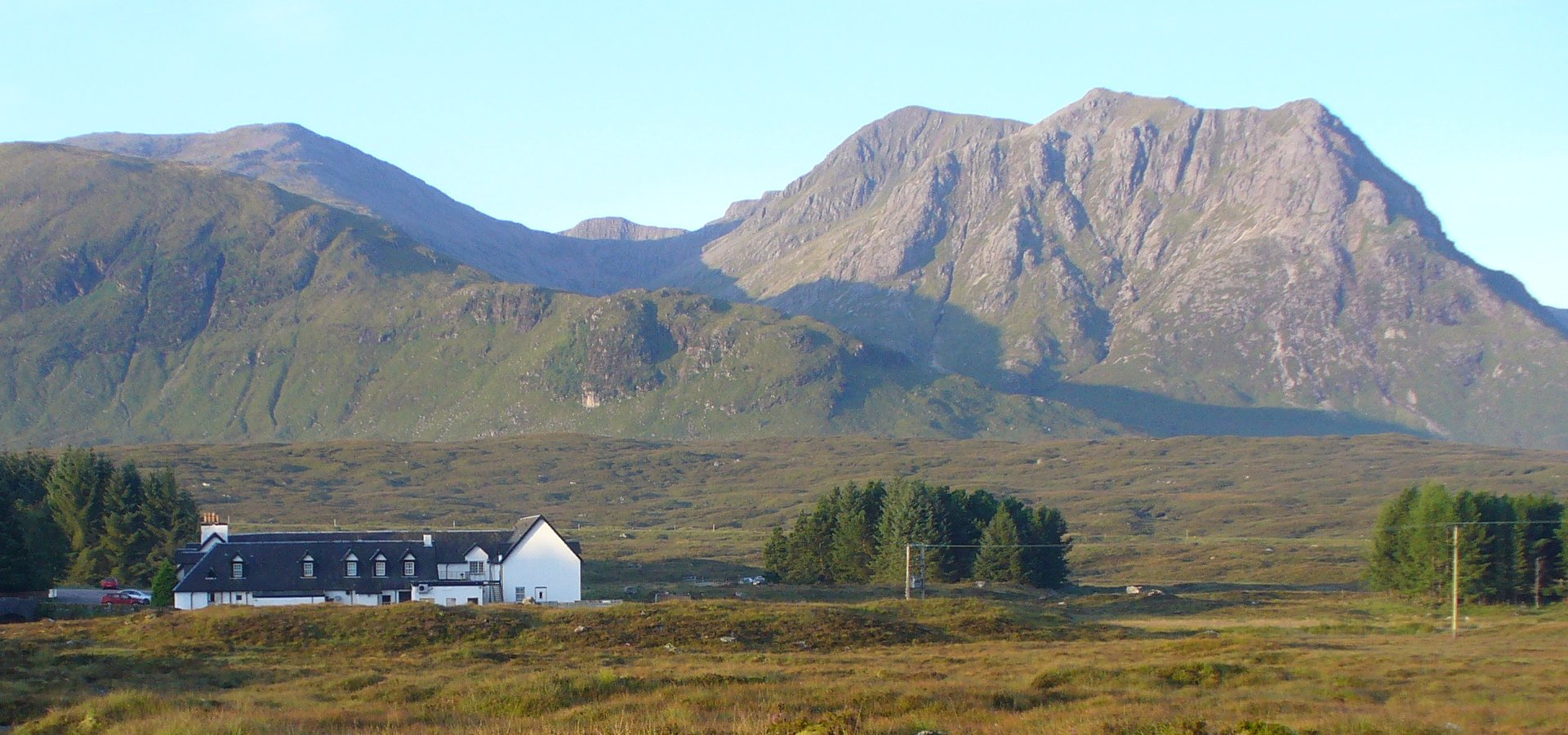
The northern cliffs of Creise tower behind the Kings House Hotel.

== Climbing ==
The most popular ascent of Creise along with the neighbouring Meall a' Bhuiridh starts at the White Corries ski Centre (grid reference NN266525) and climbs Meall a' Bhuiridh first by following the line of the ski chair lift (no self-respecting mountaineer would use the lift). The lifts and tows go right up to the summit of the mountain. The continuation to Creise goes SW and then west over a col with a height of 932 metres which connects the two mountains to reach the summit plateau of Creise. A direct ascent from the same starting point goes west across moorland to reach the foot of Sròn na Creise, it is then a scramblers route up to the northern end of the summit ridge. The hill can also be climbed as part of the Clachlet Traverse, a 25 km classic walk between the Inveroran Inn at Bridge of Orchy and the Kings House Inn in Glen Coe taking all four of the Black Mount Munros with 1700 metres of ascent. The view from the summit takes in a close up of the cliffs of Buachaille Etive Mòr and the western part of Rannoch Moor.

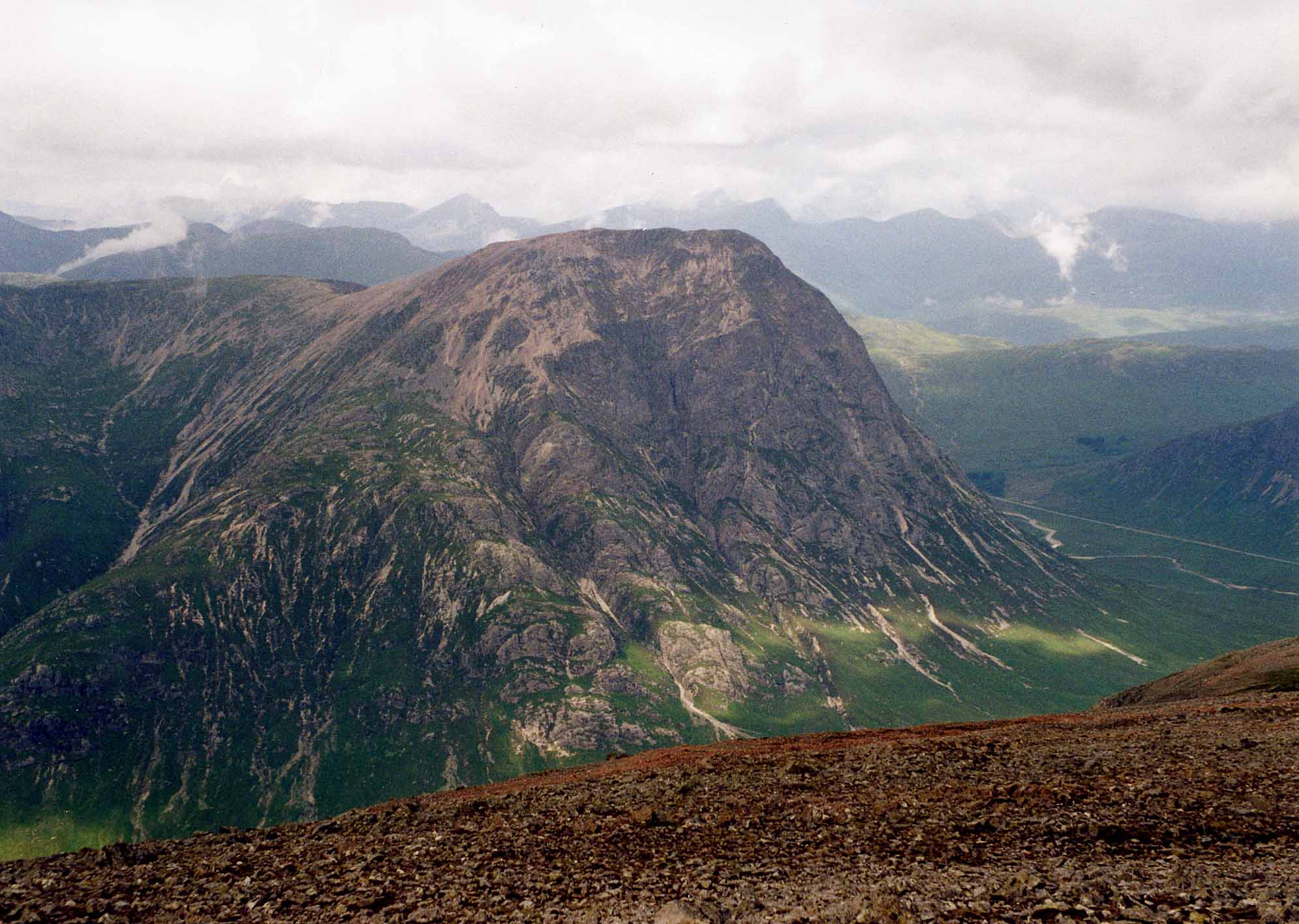
Buachaille Etive Mòr seen from the summit of Creise.
