= River Orchy =

River in Argyll and Bute, Scotland

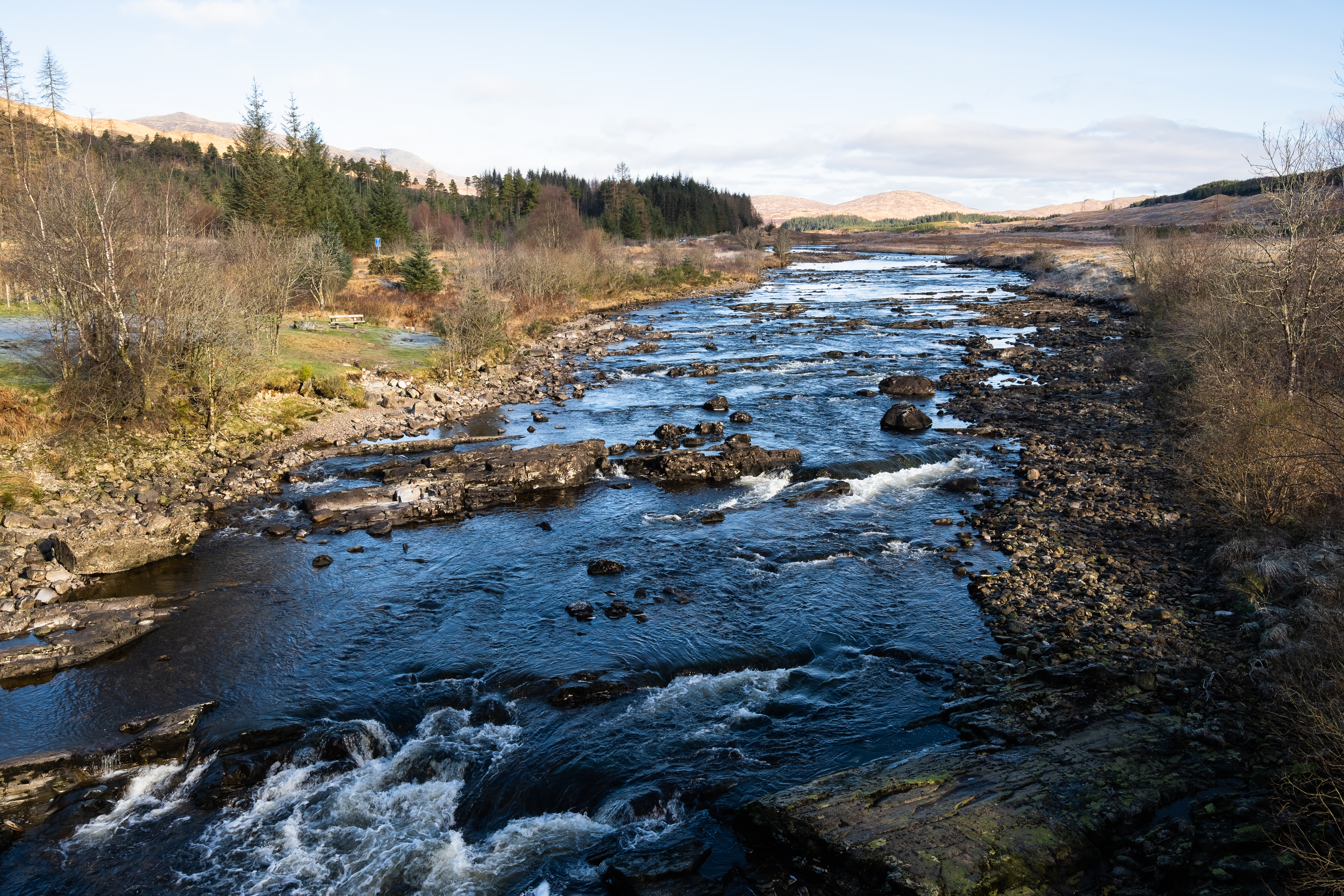
- The River Orchy in Bridge of Orchy
- Native name: Abhainn Urchaidh (Scottish Gaelic)

Physical characteristics
- Source
  - location: Loch Tulla
  - coordinates: 56°32′14″N 04°46′19″W
- Mouth
  - location: Loch Awe
  - coordinates: 56°24′18″N 05°01′58″W

The River Orchy (Scottish Gaelic: Urchaidh / Abhainn Urchaidh) is a river that passes through the village of Dalmally, Argyll and Bute in the West Highlands of Scotland. It rises in the Black Mount Forest, and flows southerly, passing through Loch Tulla and Glen Orchy before reaching Loch Awe. The hills of Beinn Mhic-Mhonaidh, Beinn Udlaidh and Beinn Bhreac-liath are to the north and south; there are falls and islands within the river. Reachable by the A82 road, tourists partake in kayaking, whitewater rafting, and fishing. Recent gold mining exploration has occurred in one of the river's glens just outside the Loch Lomond and The Trossachs National Park.

== Etymology ==
The name Orchy is possibly ancient, and derived from Brittonic are-cētia meaning "on-wood" (cf. Welsh ar-coed).

== Geography ==
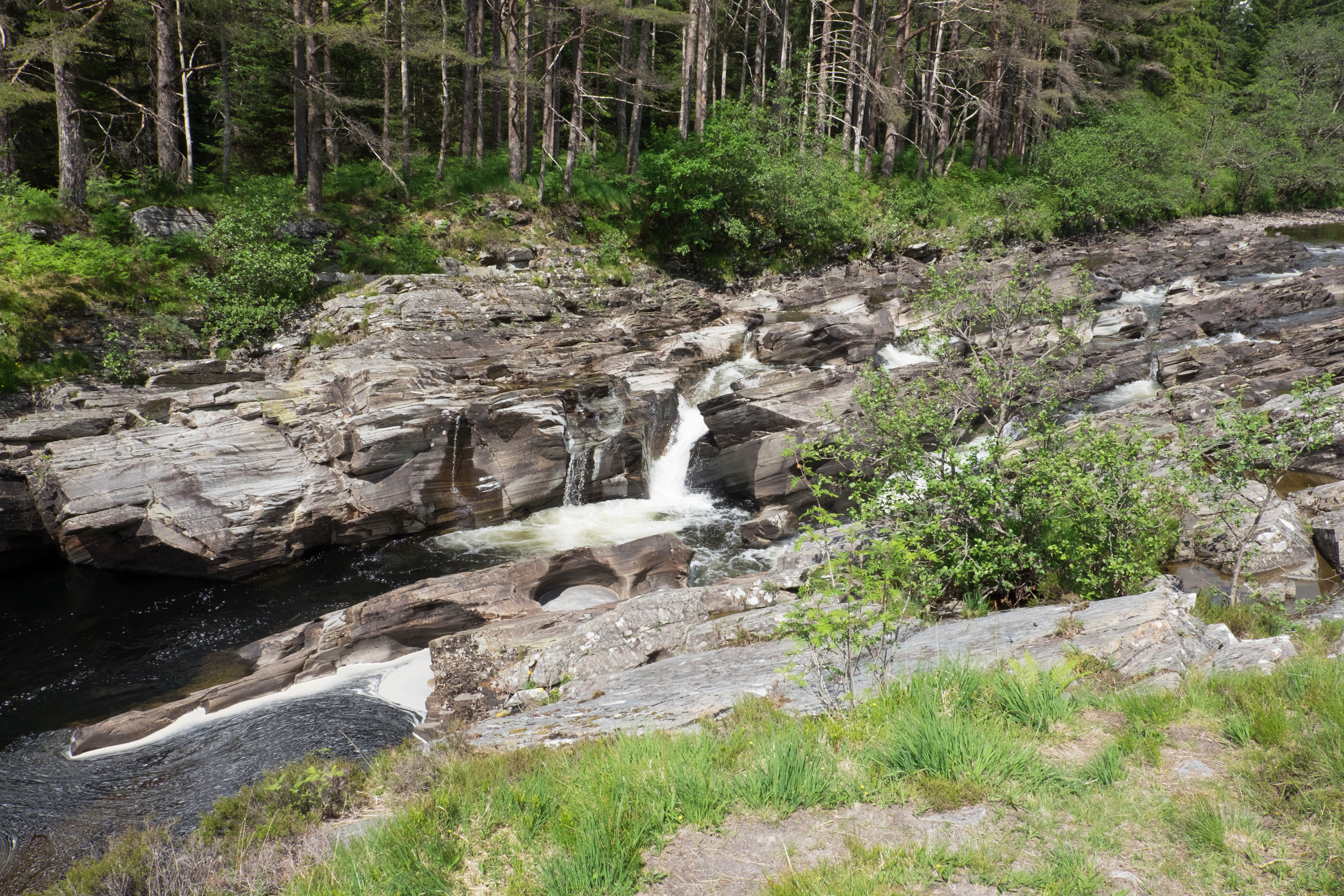
Erosion potholes in bedrock

The Orchy rises in the Black Mount Forest where its waters within the Deer Forest include the Island Pool and the Elbow Pool. After a run of 10 miles (16 kilometres), where it receives the waters of several large burns, it expands into Loch Tulla. Between Loch Tulla and Loch Awe, the river runs for 18 mi (29 km). It passes through Glen Orchy in a narrow channel. At Dalmally Vale, the river spreads into wide shallows, accumulating on banks. At the point of a shingle island, the Orchy flows through a cultivated strath, about 1/2 mi (800 m) wide. The river merges with the waters of Loch Awe at Kilchurn Castle.

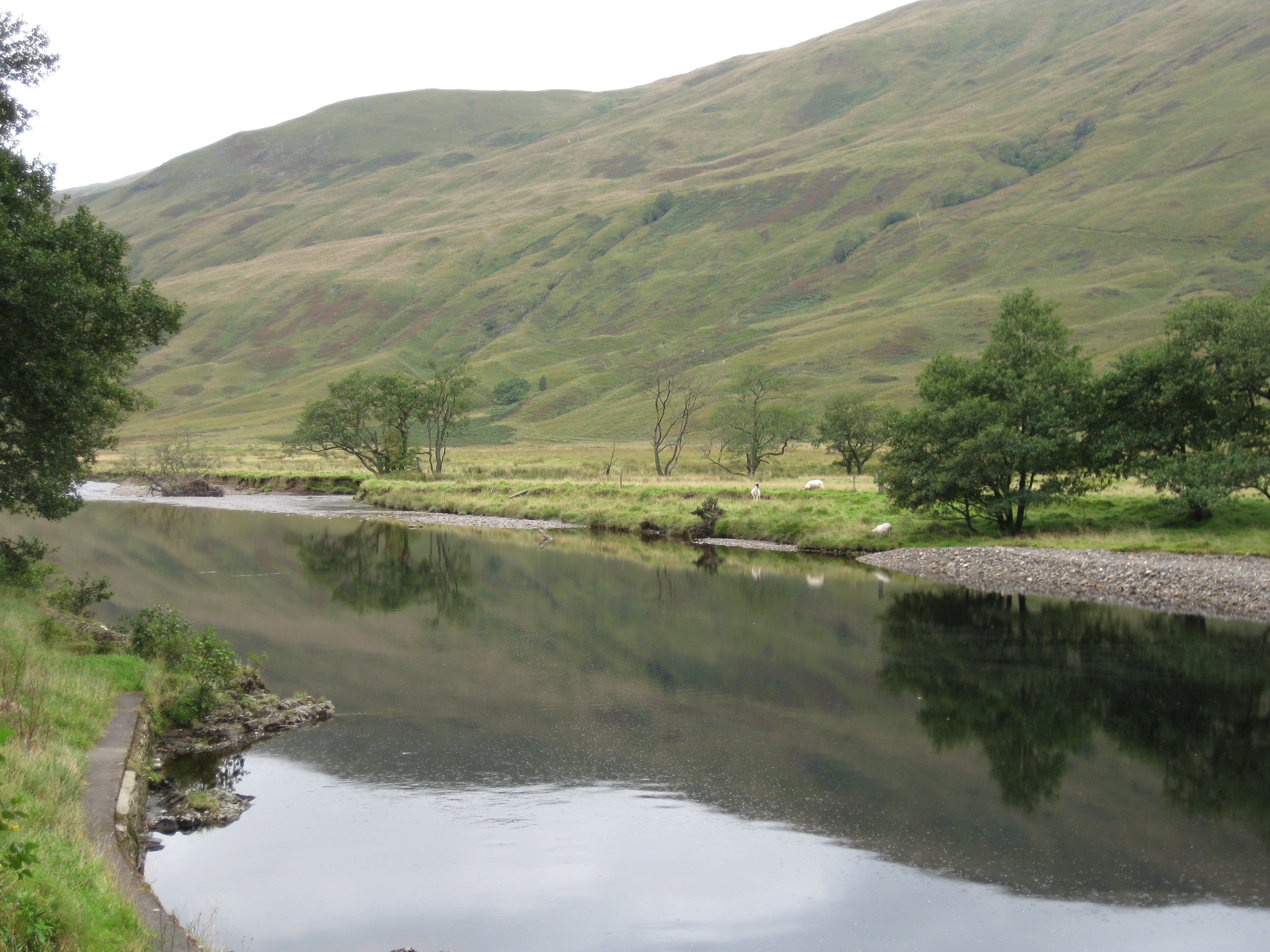
View down Glen Orchy with the River Orchy in foreground

Above the Bridge of Orchy, the river water is shallow and stony. In the 5 mi (8 km) of the river before its falls, there are many angling streams and pools. At Bridge of Orchy, the river is accessible via the A82.

The river's course changed in the mid 19th century. Prior to that, the river banks were protected, and the Orchy ran through Dalmally Vale through a narrow channel. As of 1884, the fields on the northern river bank extended further south, and shingle island was a narrow strip of gravel with a small stream. When the banks were no longer protected, a large curve was cut away into an island, causing the river to extend further and further into the banks. Around 1900, a rough breakwater was built, diverting the current, and slowing the wear on the banks. The diverted current swept the gravel to either side of the island and into the bay to the south, causing it to fill with gravel.

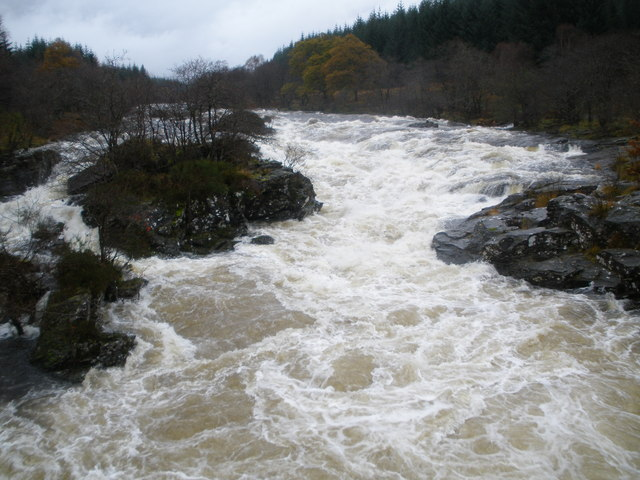
Eas Urchaidh waterfall on the River Orchy

Falls and rapids

The falls of the Orchy are roughly 7 mi (11 km) from Dalmally, and are about 20 feet (6 metres) in height, forming an almost sheer drop. On the right bank, a salmon stair or ladder has formed in the rock, going round the falls, enabling salmon to ascend. There are three significant falls: Eas Urchaidh ("the Falls of Orchy"), Easan Dubha ("Black Falls"), and Eas a' Chathaidh, as well as rapids such as "Chicken Chute", "Sheep Trolley Gorge", "Sore Tooth", "Roller Coaster", "Witches Step", and "The End of Civilisation".

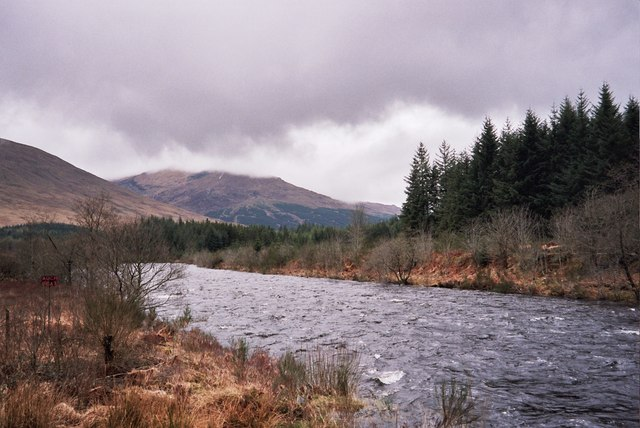
The marilyn, Beinn Udlaidh, with the River Orchy in foreground

Islands

There are islands within the river including a large wooded one about 1 mi (2 km) above Inverlochy Castle; another one, Eilean a Phortaire, just below Dalmally Bridge, which is also wooded; and immediately below the latter lies a shingle island. The shingle island was separated from the fields by the 6 ft (1.8 m) drop of the bank. Glenorchy Parish Church and the burial place of the Macgregors are located on an islet formed by the river; the well of Saint Conan is nearby.

== Fauna ==
Wildlife includes salmon and trout, as well as otter, golden eagle and short-eared owl.

== Tourism ==
The river's falls and rapids, Grades 3–5, are enjoyed by kayakers and rafting enthusiasts. Whitewater rafting season is October to March. Fishermen can fish for trout, while salmon fishing season runs from February to October. The Dalmally Beats 1, 2 and 3 offer 6 mi (10 km) of double-bank fishing from the Bridge Pool in Dalmally to Sam's Box Pool in Glen Orchy. There is vehicle access to most of the pools on both banks. The Upper Craig Beat, an area of approximately 2 mi (3 km) between Little Colonels pool and the Boat pool, allows fishing from both banks. Hill walkers climb up to Beinn Dorain, an ascent of 1,076 m (3,530 ft), 6 mi (10 km) away.

== Gold prospect ==
Gold mining used to take place at the Cononish mine, near Tyndrum, Scotgold obtained planning permission for development of the mine for gold and silver extraction in early 2012. In 2010, gold mining exploration began in a River Orchy glen, approximately 5 km (3 mi) outside the Lomond National Park. The river is reported to cross several quartz sulphide veins with significant gold mineralisation. Environmental concerns about possible gold mining were raised due to the area's proximity to both the national park and Beinn Udlaidh, a popular climbing marilyn.

== Sources ==
- This article includes text incorporated from Edinburgh Field Naturalists' and Microscopical Society's "Transactions of the Edinburgh Field Naturalists' and Microscopical Society" (1907), a publication now in the public domain.
- This article includes text incorporated from A. Grimble's "The salmon rivers of Scotland" (1900), a publication now in the public domain.
- This article includes text incorporated from J.M. Wilson's "Nelsons' hand-book to Scotland: for tourists" (1860), a publication now in the public domain.
- This article includes text incorporated from Bannatyne Club's "Publications" (1854), a publication now in the public domain.
- This article includes text incorporated from Great Britain, Parliament, House of Commons's "House of Commons papers" (1885), a publication now in the public domain.
