= Lochan na h-Achlaise =

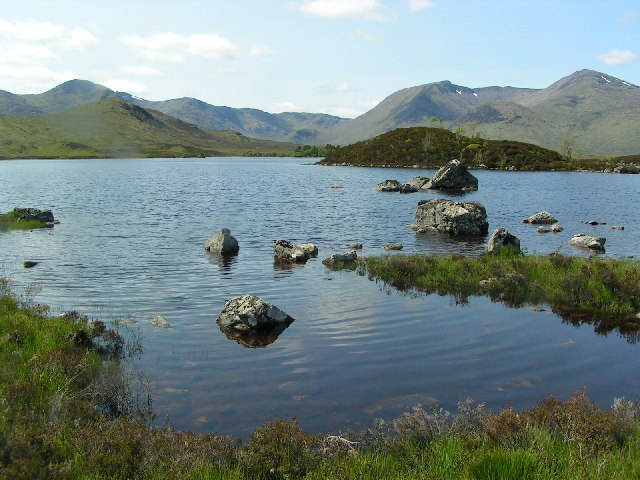
- Lochan na - h Achlaise and The Black Mount in the distance.

- Location within Argyll and Bute
- Location: grid reference NN302491
- Coordinates: 56.6037°N 4.7675°W
- Type: freshwater loch
- Ocean/sea sources: Atlantic Ocean
- Max. length: 1.28 km (0.80 mi)
- Max. width: 1.20 km (0.75 mi)
- Surface area: 23.6 ha (58 acres)
- Average depth: 10 ft (3.0 m)
- Max. depth: 28 ft (8.5 m)
- Shore length^{1}: 7.2 km (4.5 mi)
- Surface elevation: 296 m (971 ft)
- Settlements: Inverkirkaig
- ^{1} Shore length is not a well-defined measure.

Lochan na h-Achlaise in Scottish Gaelic Loch of the Armpit, is an irregular shaped, somewhat triangular or heart shaped, freshwater loch on Rannoch Moor, Argyll and Bute in the Scottish West Highlands, within the Highland council area of Scotland.
