= Black Mount =

Mountain range in Scotland

Coordinates: 56.5450°N 4.7950°W

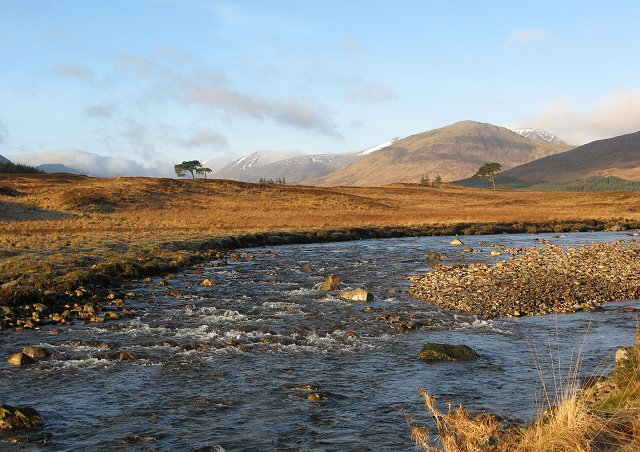
The Abhainn Shira drains the south of Blackmount Forest.

Black Mount (also Blackmount) is a mountain range located in Argyll and Bute, Scotland. It is situated between Glen Orchy and Glen Coe. Its four Munros include Stob Ghabhar, Stob a' Choire Odhair, Creise and Meall a' Bhuiridh. The hills of Ben Inverveigh and Meall Tairbh are located between Black Mount and the Bridge of Orchy.

The Black Mount Deer Forest includes moorland, the mountain, as well as several rivers, burns, lochs, and tarns. The scenic beauty of the area has led to its inclusion in the Ben Nevis and Glen Coe National Scenic Area, one of 40 such areas in Scotland.

On 28 August 1980, Black Mount's Forest Lodge became protected as a category B listed building by Historic Scotland.

== Clachlet Traverse ==
The Clachlet Traverse is a 25 km hike over the four Munro peaks of the range, namely Stob a' Choire Odhair, Stob Ghabhar, Creise and Meall a' Bhuiridh. The route begins at the Inveroran Inn, near Bridge of Orchy, and ends at the Kingshouse Hotel at the junction of Glen Etive and Glen Coe.

If relying on public transport, the route involves an additional 4 km hike from Bridge of Orchy, which is served by both bus and rail, into Inveroran/Victoria Bridge. The Kingshouse Hotel is served by the Fort William to Glasgow bus service.
