= The Heart Stone =

Coordinates: 56.6865°N 4.5378°W

Heart Stone: Scottish Gaelic: Clach Cridhe
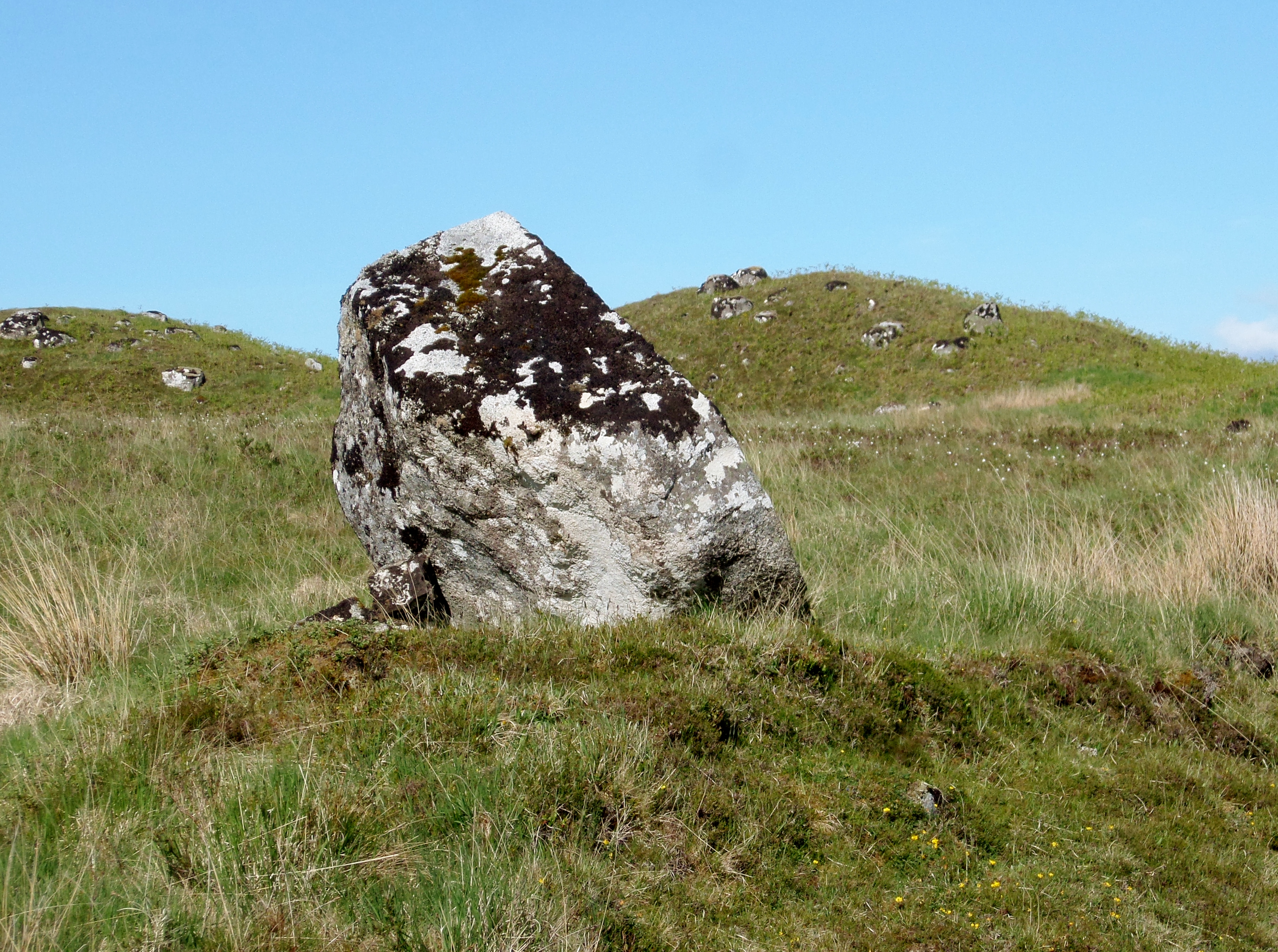
- The Heart Stone

- Location within Perth and Kinross
- OS grid reference: NN 4467 5785
- Council area: Perth and Kinross
- Country: Scotland
- Sovereign state: United Kingdom
- Post town: Pitlochry
- Police: Scotland
- Fire: Scottish
- Ambulance: Scottish

The Heart Stone or Clach Cridhe in Perth and Kinross, Scotland is an ancient landmark on Rannoch Moor situated on the old 'Road to the Isles'. During the construction of the B846 road from Kinloch Rannoch to Rannoch railway station it was seen as an obstacle and was drilled and split and later it was moved to its present location in the 1950s to prevent it being submerged in the artificially enlarged Loch Eigheach Gaur Reservoir. The stone now stands beside the B846 road from the station to Kinloch Rannoch.

== History ==
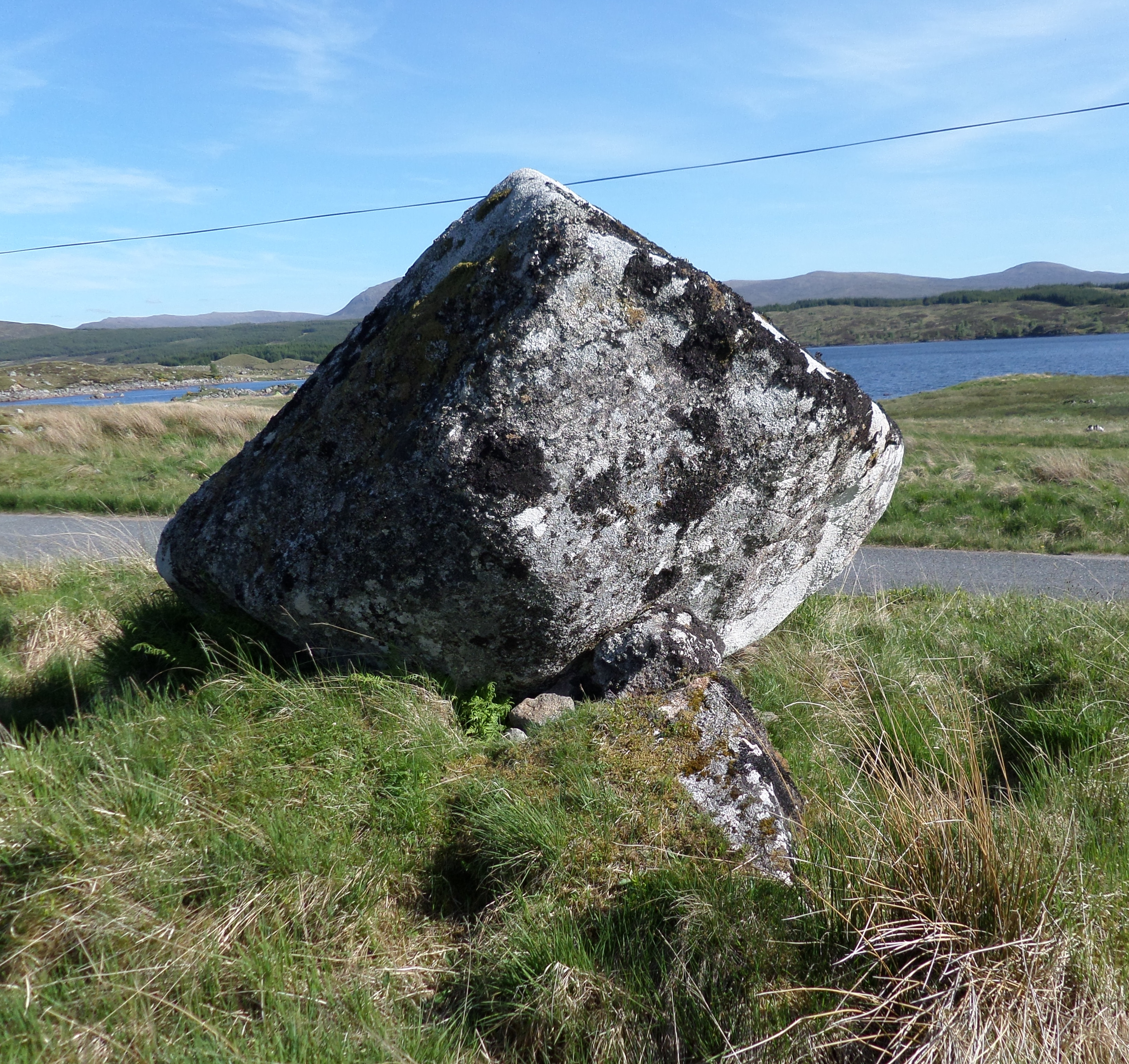
The Broken Heart Stone with Loch Eigheach in the background

The ruins of Ceanncoille (The Head of the Wood) steading on the opposite side of Loch Eigheach from the stone was originally a stronghold of the Menzies clan and it is located at the edge of the Black Wood of Rannoch, a well known area for thieves and bandits on the 'Road to the Isles' or to the Falkirk trysts in times past. The old track between Ceanncoille, Tom a Mheirlich and the shielings at Carnach is under the waters of the enlarged loch which once had several small islands. The drovers' routes across the moor were marked by cairns on small knolls, signifying the safest routes as well as prominent features such as unusually shaped boulders, etc.

The road builders mainly followed an original track and found that the 'Heart Stone' would be an obstruction and rather than divert the road round it they split it in half using rock drills. Following the damage the stone acquired the appropriate soubriquet of the "Broken Heart Stone".

Lying on the side of the road the 'Heart Stone' was a well known landmark to locals and travellers alike over many centuries and when the then North of Scotland Hydro Electric Board proposed the Gaur Hydroelectric Scheme it became apparent that the stone would be submerged under the waters of a significantly enlarged Loch Eigheach. After a campaign involving letters arriving from all over the world the contractors on the job were instructed to move the circa 15 ton stone to the point where the old road from Corrour meets the B846 road to Rannoch Station. The Corrour road used to continue southwards; however, it is now submerged. The history of the stone is recorded on the information boards at Rannoch railway station. The boulder is likely to be a glacial erratic left here after the last ice age.

== See also ==
- List of places in Perth and Kinross
