= Loch Tulla =

Lake in Scotland

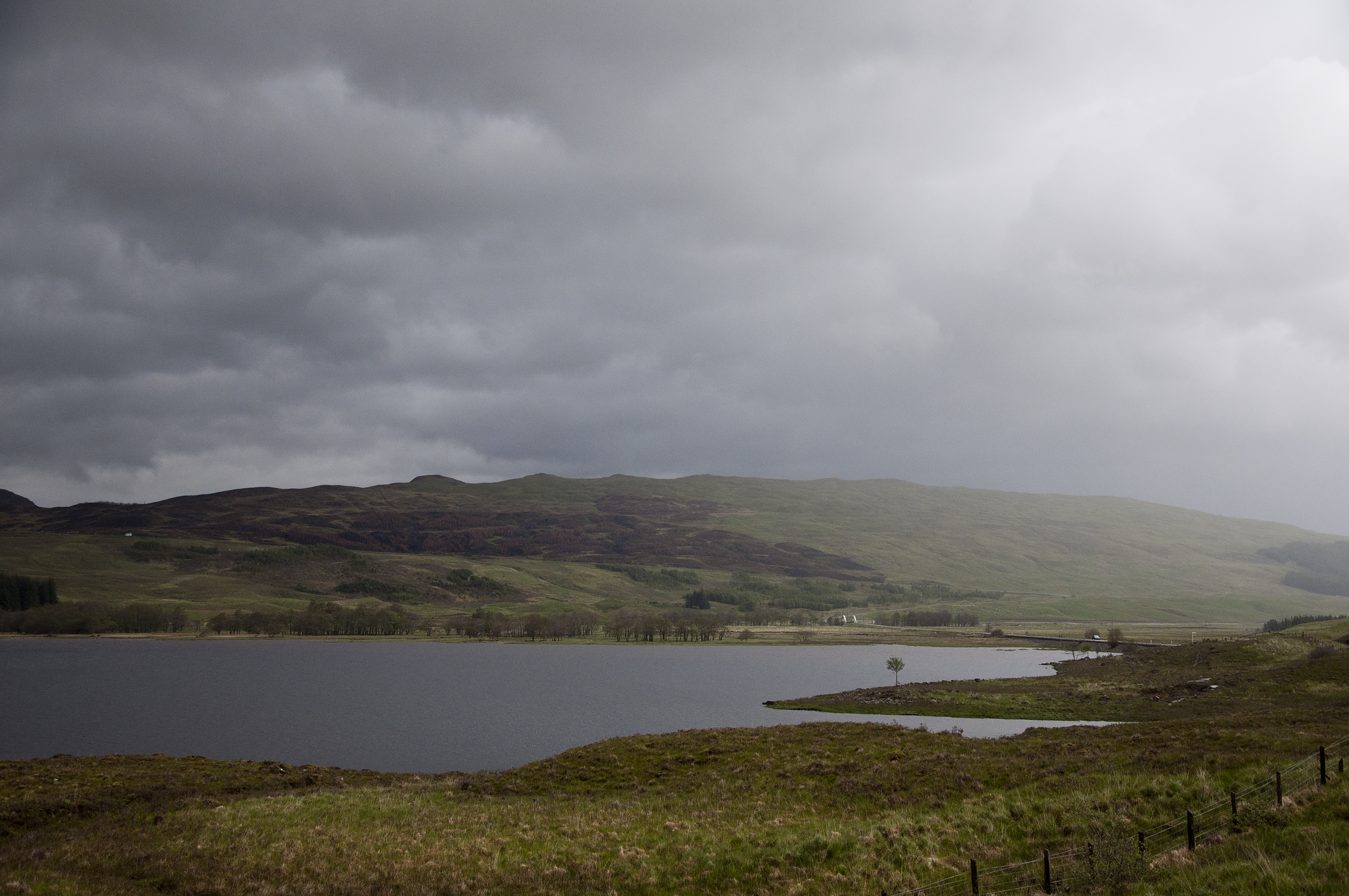

- Location within Argyll and Bute
- Location: Argyll and Bute, Scotland
- Coordinates: 56.54608°N 4.77821°W
- Basin countries: United Kingdom

Loch Tulla (Scottish Gaelic: Loch Toilbhe [l̪ˠɔx ˈt̪ʰɔlɔvə]) is a small loch at grid reference NN293428 near Bridge of Orchy and Glen Coe in Scotland and in the central highlands. It contains salmon some of which are bred locally. The loch is 2.5 miles in length and an average 0.5 miles in width, with a mean depth of 33 feet and a maximum depth of 84 feet. The river River Orchy flows from the southeastern side of the loch.

It lies north-east of the Inveroran Hotel, a popular West Highland Way stop off point close to Bridge of Orchy.

== History ==
In the 1892 annual report of the Fishery Board for Scotland, Loch Tulla was noted as having trout fishing that was unsurpassed in Scotland sixty years prior, but had since been ruined by the introduction of pike by Lord Breadalbane after being advised by "some dangerous person" to do so in 1848. The Marquis of Breadalbane was obliged to use nets to keep the pike numbers low in the loch for fishing purposes.
