= Rowardennan =

Coordinates: 56.1553°N 4.6420°W

Rowardennan: Scottish Gaelic: Rubha Aird Eònain
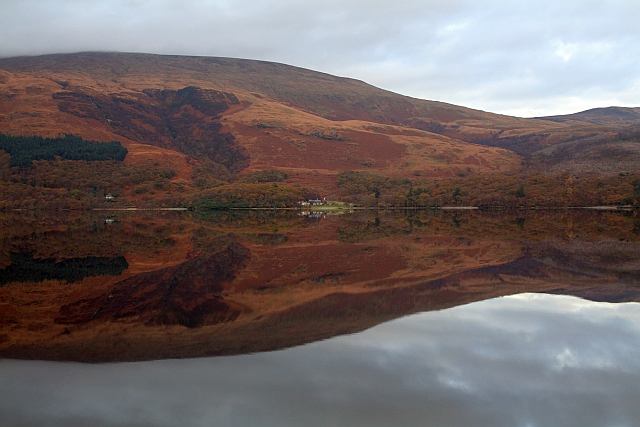
- Looking east across Loch Lomond to Rowardennan

- Location within the Stirling council area
- OS grid reference: NS360990
- Civil parish: Buchanan
- Council area: Stirling
- Lieutenancy area: Stirling and Falkirk
- Country: Scotland
- Sovereign state: United Kingdom
- Post town: GLASGOW
- Postcode district: G63
- Dialling code: 01360
- Police: Scotland
- Fire: Scottish
- Ambulance: Scottish
- UK Parliament: Stirling
- Scottish Parliament: Stirling

Rowardennan (Gaelic: Rubha Aird Eònain) is a small rural community on the eastern shore of Loch Lomond in Stirling council, Scotland. It is mainly known as the starting point for the main path up Ben Lomond.

Rowardennan is at the northern end of the public road, but the West Highland Way, a long-distance footpath between Glasgow and Fort William, passes through the area and continues north along the side of the loch. Rowardennan has a hotel, hostel, chalet accommodation, caravan site, and camping for hikers on the West Highland Way. A small passenger ferry crosses the loch to Tarbet on the opposite shore.

During the summer months, Rowardennan can be reached by ferry from Tarbet, Luss, or Inverbeg, on the opposite shore of the Loch Lomond.

It appears as "Dennan's Row" in Walter Scott's poem The Lady of the Lake.
