= Meall a' Bhùiridh =

Mountain in Scotland

Coordinates: 56.61180°N 4.85313°W

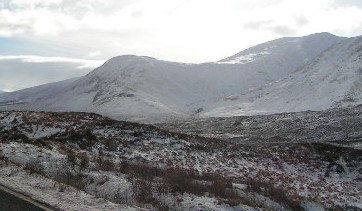
- Meall a' Bhùiridh from the A82

Highest point
- Elevation: 1,108 m (3,635 ft)
- Prominence: 795 m (2,608 ft)Ranked 36th in British Isles
- Parent peak: Ben Lawers
- Listing: Marilyn, Munro

Naming
- English translation: Hill of the bellowing
- Language of name: Gaelic
- Pronunciation: Scottish Gaelic: [ˈmjaul̪ˠ ə ˈvuːɾʲɪ]

Geography
- Location: Rannoch Moor, Scotland
- OS grid: NN250503
- Topo map: OS Landranger 41

Meall a' Bhùiridh (IPA:[ˈmauɫ̪ˈaˈvuːɾʲɪʝ]) is a mountain on the edge of Rannoch Moor in the Highlands of Scotland. It lies near the top of Glen Coe and Glen Etive, overlooking the Kings House Hotel inn and the A82 road. The Glencoe Ski area is located on the northern slopes of the peak.

Meall a' Bhùiridh is linked by a high bealach to the neighbouring peak of Creise, and the two hills are often climbed in conjunction, starting and finishing at the ski area carpark.

The Clachlet Traverse is a 25 km north-to-south route linking the inn at Inveroran with the Kingshouse. Meall a' Bhùiridh is the final of four Munros crossed on this route, the others being (south to north) Stob a' Choire Odhair, Stob Ghabhar and Creise.

== See also ==
- Ben Nevis
- List of Munro mountains
- Mountains and hills of Scotland
