= Beinn Udlaidh =

Mountain in Argyll and Bute, Scotland

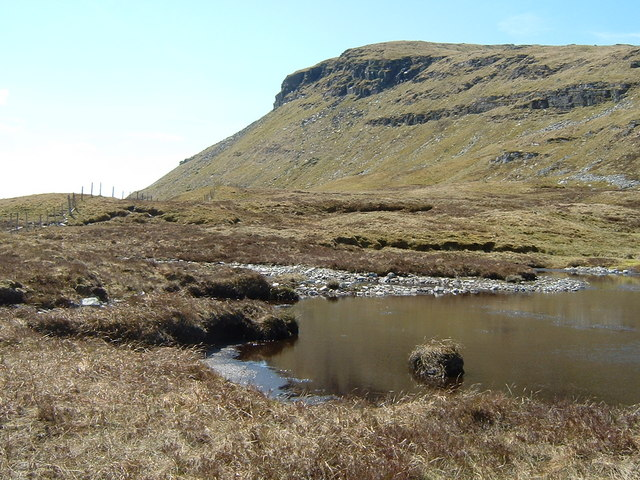
- Beinn Udlaidh

Highest point
- Elevation: 840 m (2,760 ft)
- Prominence: 522 m (1,713 ft)
- Listing: Corbett, Marilyn
- Coordinates: 56°27′36″N 4°47′33″W

Geography
- Location: Argyll and Bute, Scotland
- Parent range: Grampian Mountains
- OS grid: NN280331
- Topo map: OS Landranger 50

Beinn Udlaidh (840 m) is a mountain in the Grampian Mountains, Scotland. It is located near the village of Tyndrum in Argyll and Bute.

The mountain has a plateaued summit, which has been scarred by corries on its northern side. Also on its northern side, a quartzite dyke descends from the summit ridge all the way down to Glen Orchy.
