= West Highland Way =

Long distance footpath in Scotland

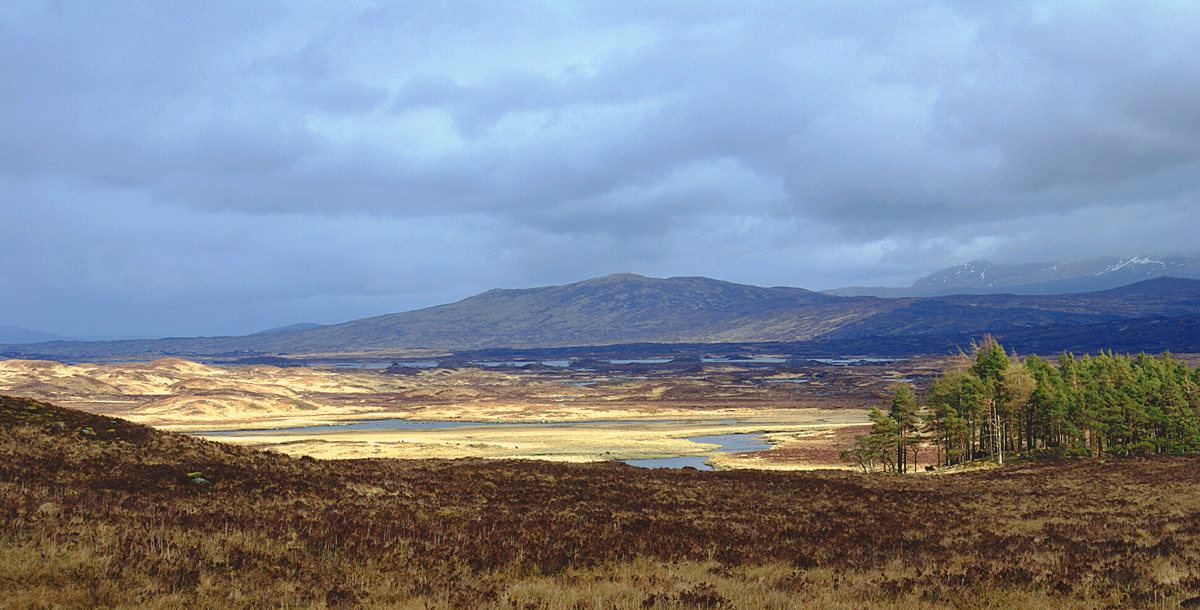
- Rannoch Moor on the West Highland Way, between Bridge of Orchy and the Kingshouse.
- Length: 154 km (96 mi)
- Location: Highlands of Scotland
- Established: 1980
- Designation: Scotland's Great Trails
- Trailheads: Milngavie 55.9411°N 4.3180°W; Fort William 56.8215°N 5.0941°W
- Use: Primarily intended for walkers
- Elevation gain/loss: 3,155 metres (10,351 ft) gain
- Highest point: Devil's Staircase near Kingshouse 56.6764°N 4.9135°W, 550 m (1,800 ft)
- Lowest point: sea level
- Difficulty: Moderate
- Season: All year
- Hazards: Weather
- Website: www.westhighlandway.org

The West Highland Way (Scottish Gaelic: Slighe Taobh an Iar na Gàidhealtachd) is a linear long-distance route in Scotland. It is 154 km (96 miles) long, running from Milngavie north of Glasgow to Fort William in the Scottish Highlands, with an element of hill walking in the route. The trail, which opened in 1980, was Scotland's first officially designated Long Distance Route, and is now designated by NatureScot as one of Scotland's Great Trails. It is primarily intended as a long distance walking route, and whilst many sections are suitable for mountain biking and horseriding there are obstacles and surfaces that will require these users to dismount in places.

It is managed by the West Highland Way Management Group (WHWMG) consisting of the local authorities for East Dunbartonshire, Stirling, Argyll and Bute and Highland, alongside the Loch Lomond and The Trossachs National Park Authority and NatureScot. The path is estimated to generate £5.5 million each year for the local economy. As of 2023 about 45,000 people complete the full route each year, with a similar number walking individual sections.

Notable wildlife that may be seen includes feral goats (descendants of those left from the Highland Clearances), red deer, and around the peaks sometimes golden eagles.

== History ==
There were no trails of this kind in Scotland until the Way was opened. After the Second World War ex-RAF man Tom Hunter from Glasgow conceived of the idea of an official footpath, partly to protect the eastern shore of Loch Lomond from development. The route, with some challenging terrain, had to be worked out, and landowners negotiated with. Significant in the development of the Way was geographer Fiona Rose who surveyed the route over a year in the early 1970s, covering some 1,000 miles on foot.

The trail was approved for development in 1974, and after completion was opened on 6 October 1980 by Lord Mansfield so becoming the first officially designated long-distance footpath in Scotland.

In June 2010, the West Highland Way was co-designated as part of the International Appalachian Trail.

In 2020 plans to celebrate the Way's 40th birthday were interrupted by the COVID-19 pandemic. A virtual exhibition was set up to showcase the history, memories and highlights of the first 40 years. A special video welcome was recorded by Jimmie Macgregor, whose radio and TV programmes helped popularise the Way in the 1980s.

In 2025, a charity, the West Highland Way Trust (WHWT), was set up to raise funds to maintain and improve the route, including bridge repairs, improved drainage and maintenance of signs.

== The route ==
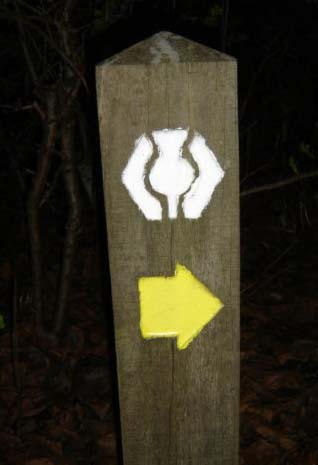
WHW route marker

The path uses many ancient roads, including ancient drovers' roads, military roads dating to the Jacobite uprisings and old coaching routes. It is usually walked from south to north, making it a journey from the Lowlands to the Highlands. The route is commonly walked in seven to eight days, although many fitter and more experienced walkers do it in five or six, staying overnight in villages along the Way. The route can be covered in considerably less time than this (as of 2020 the record was 13 h 41 m 8 s), but a less hurried progress is the choice of the majority of walkers, allowing for appreciation of the countryside along the Way. Due to the large number of walkers being constrained to a single track, some parts of the Way have become badly eroded. However, a considerable amount of work is undertaken to maintain the route.

A walk along the Way is often broken up into sections or stages, each of which will typically be walked in a day. One pattern of sections, travelling from south to north, is as follows:

=== Milngavie to Drymen ===
The path officially starts in the centre of Milngavie, a town on the northern fringe of the conurbation of Glasgow. A granite obelisk is located a short distance from Milngavie railway station. Heading north, the path passes Mugdock Castle and Mugdock Country Park before emerging into open countryside, and the Campsie Fells can be seen. By the west side of Craigallian loch the path passes a small monument to commemorate The Craigallian Fire, an important historical symbol for outdoor activities in Scotland. As the Way approaches the Campsies by the piece of ground known as Tinkers Loan, there is an opportunity to explore adjacent hills such as Dumgoyne (grid reference NS541837; 427 m or 1,401 ft) or the small but heavily wooded Dumgoyach (NS531810; 108 m or 354 ft). Finally the Way reaches the village of Drymen.

This section is about 19 km (12 miles) long:

- Milngavie to Carbeth – 8 km (5 miles)
- Carbeth to Drymen – 11 km (7 miles)

=== Drymen to Balmaha ===
After leaving Drymen the path enters Garadhban Forest before reaching the first major summit of the route, the 361-metre (1,184 ft) Conic Hill , a site of special scientific interest lying on the Highland Boundary Fault. The main route goes over the summit, but an alternative "bad weather" route via Milton of Buchanan allows walkers to avoid the ascent to the summit. The village of Balmaha on the eastern shore of Loch Lomond is the next settlement reached.

- Drymen to Balmaha – 13 km (8 miles)

=== Balmaha to Rowardennan ===
The path heads north along the wooded eastern shore of Loch Lomond, to reach the village of Rowardennan, the furthest point north to which there is road access available from the south on the east shore of the loch. Camping along the shore of Loch Lomond is by permit only from 1 March to 30 September.

- Balmaha to Rowardennan – 11 km (7 miles)

=== Rowardennan to Inverarnan ===
The path leaves Rowardennan and continues north, along the wooded eastern shore of Loch Lomond to Inverarnan. The route follows the lower slopes of Ben Lomond before returning to the waterside at Inversnaid, where there is road access from the east, via Aberfoyle. North of Inversnaid the route passes a cavern known as Rob Roy's cave, before reaching Inverarnan. This section is regarded as the most difficult of the entire Way. Just north of Inversnaid the eastern shore is very steep, dominated by boulders which requires some scrambling over obstacles.

- Rowardennan to Inverarnan – 19.5 km (12 miles)

=== Inverarnan to Tyndrum ===
The way skirts the hills just west of Crianlarich alongside Bogle Glen. At the deer gate an additional path leads to Crianlarich. Meanwhile, the route continues up through the dense woodland to one of the high points of the Way before descending to cross the A82 and pass through Auchtertyre Farm and gently up to Tyndrum.

- Inverarnan to Tyndrum – 19.5 km (12 miles)

=== Tyndrum to Glen Coe ===
This is one of the more remote sections of the route, with little in the way of settlements. The route passes over the drovers' road between Bridge of Orchy and Inveroran with large panoramic views, and not much sign of civilisation. This section is about 30 km (19 miles) long:

- Tyndrum to Bridge of Orchy – 11 km (7 miles)
- Bridge of Orchy to Inveroran Hotel – 3 km (2 miles)
- Inveroran Hotel to Kingshouse – 16 km (10 miles)

=== Glen Coe to Kinlochleven ===
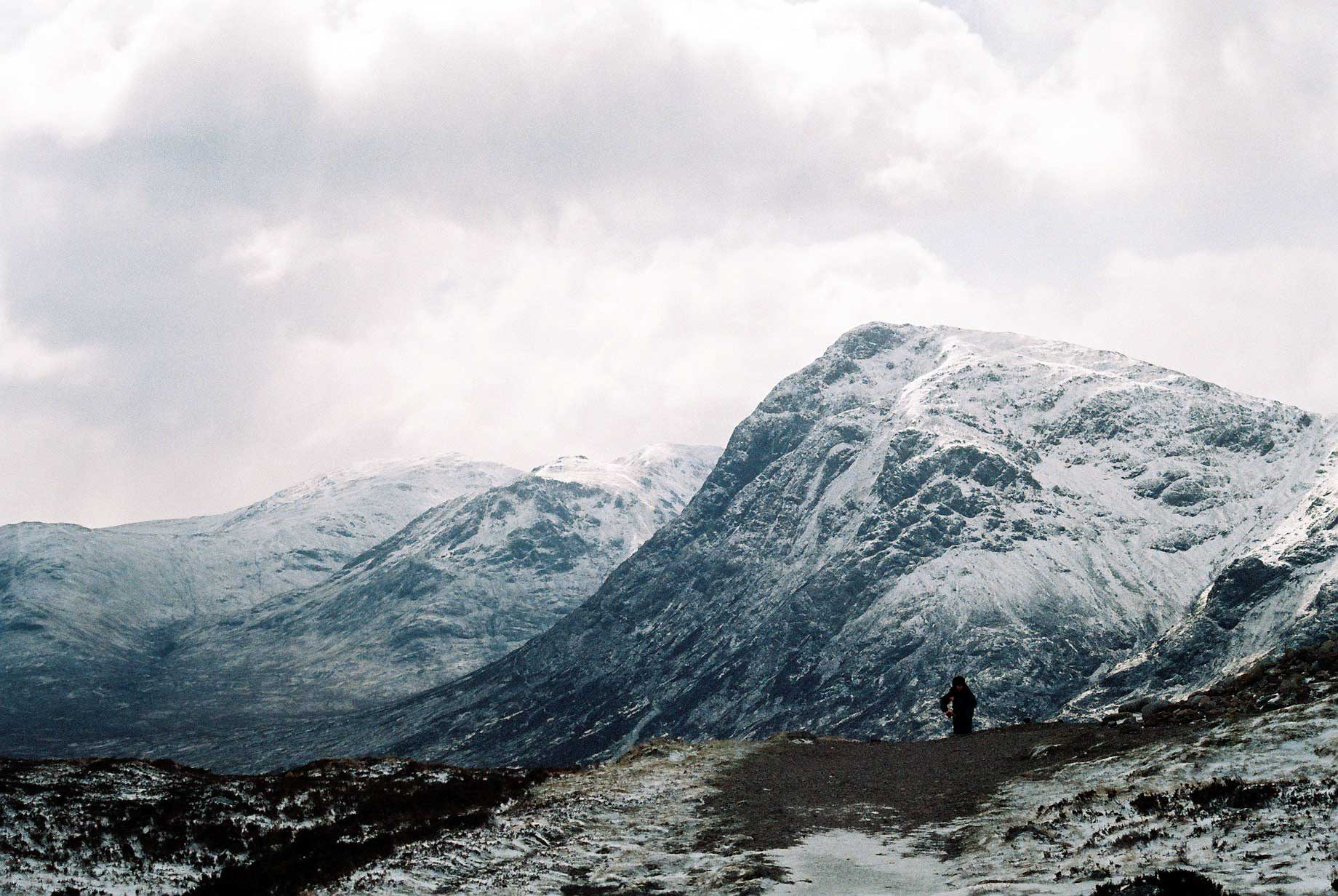
Devil's Staircase

Glen Coe (Scottish Gaelic: Gleann Comhann) is often considered one of the most spectacular and beautiful places in Scotland, and is a part of the designated National Scenic Area of Ben Nevis and Glen Coe. The route climbs the Devil's Staircase before a great descent to sea level at Kinlochleven.

- Kingshouse to Kinlochleven – 14 km (9 miles)

=== Kinlochleven to Fort William ===
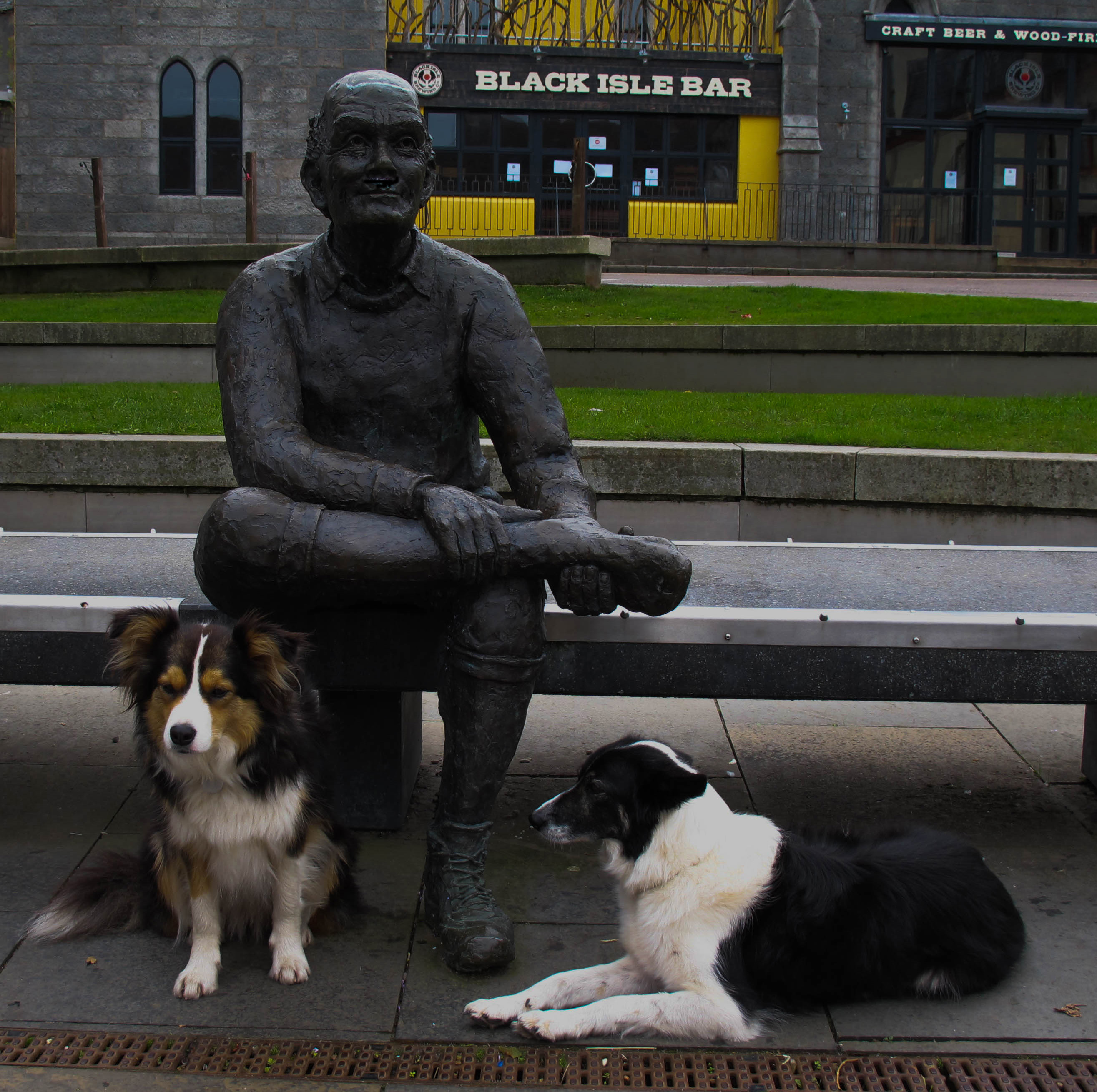
"Sair Feet" Statue at the Fort William end of the West Highland Way

The final stage skirts the Mamore Mountains on an old military road and descends into Glen Nevis before finishing in Fort William. Starting with a steep climb out of Kinlochleven, the route follows the contour of the valley, until the forest is reached outside Fort William. The last stage passes the foot of Ben Nevis, before finally reaching the pavements leading into the traditional finish line in Fort William, where a statue depicting a man with sore feet marks the end of the path. Many walkers crown their achievement of walking the Way by climbing Ben Nevis, the highest mountain in the United Kingdom.

- Kinlochleven to Fort William – 24 km (15 miles)

== Ultramarathons on the West Highland Way ==
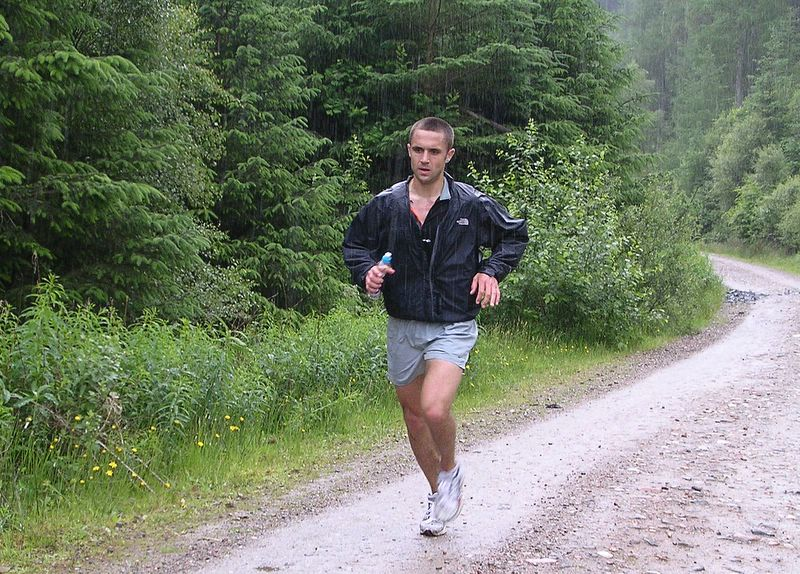
Jez Bragg setting a new West Highland Way Race record of 15 h 44 m 50 s on 24 June 2006

There are several ultramarathons held on the West Highland Way. The Highland Fling Race is an annual 85 km (53 mi) race from Milngavie to Tyndrum. The Devil o' the Highlands Footrace is 69 km (43 mi) from Tyndrum to Fort William, along the northern section of the way. The West Highland Way Race is an annual 153 km (95 mi) race along the full south–north distance of the West Highland Way. The West Highland Way Challenge Race is a younger, alternative race which also covers the full route.

=== West Highland Way Race ===
The race has been run in its current form since 1991. The race starts at 1 am on the Saturday nearest to the summer solstice.

Bobby Shields (Clydesdale Harriers) and Duncan Watson (Lochaber) initiated the idea of racing over Scotland's most popular long-distance footpath.

On 22 June 1985 the two set out from Milngavie. Their route differed in many ways from the route of today: it was shorter, at 150 km (93 mi), and had 13 km (8 mi) more on tarmac, with around 150 m (500 ft) less of climbing. After around 100 km (60 mi), as they started over Rannoch Moor, they decided to cease competing against each other and ran together. They set a time of 17 hours 48 minutes 30 seconds.

In 1986 Shields and Watson opened up an invitation to some fellow runners to race in the opposite direction, Fort William – Milngavie. 1987 saw a return to the established direction of running, South – North. Of eleven starters seven arrived in Fort William. Jim Stewart took over the organisation of the event in 1991, as the footpath was now complete, the course was changed, increasing the distance to 153 km (95 mi) with only 15 km (9 mi) on road and more climbing was introduced. With this increased difficulty runners were likely to be out longer and now a bigger percentage are out for a second night.

Dario Melaragni, who had completed the race himself three times, took over as race director in 1999. He developed the format of the race by involving local mountain rescue teams who provided emergency response during the event. He also inaugurated and developed the race website, which has become a prime source of information for runners wishing to attempt the race. The race has gained status in recent years and entries open in the November preceding each race – for the 2013 a ballot process was used for the first time to allow 250 entries.

In July 2009, whilst out running with friends, Melaragni suffered a suspected heart attack and died near the summit of Lochnagar in the Cairngorms. His funeral was attended by many people wearing West Highland Way Race clothing.

The race record holder is Rob Sinclair with a time of 13 h 41 m 8 s, set in June 2017. The female record holder is Lucy Colquhoun of Aviemore with a time of 17 h 16 m 20 s, set in 2007.

== Towns, villages and hotels along the Way ==
Listed south to north, with approximate distances from Milngavie, the West Highland Way passes the following towns, villages and hotels:

- Milngavie
- Beech Tree Inn, Glengoyne
- Drymen
- Balmaha, Loch Lomond; 30 km (19 mi)
- Rowardennan, Loch Lomond; 44 km (27 mi)
- Inversnaid, 54 km (34 mi)
- Inverarnan, 64 km (40 mi)
- Crianlarich, 75 km (47 mi)
- Tyndrum, 85 km (53 mi)
- Bridge of Orchy, 95 km (59 mi)
- Inveroran, 99 km (62 mi)
- Kings House Hotel, 115 km (71 mi)
- Kinlochleven, 130 km (81 mi)
- Fort William, 154.5 km (96.0 mi)
