= Kings House Hotel =

Scottish inn

Coordinates: 56.64986°N 4.83969°W

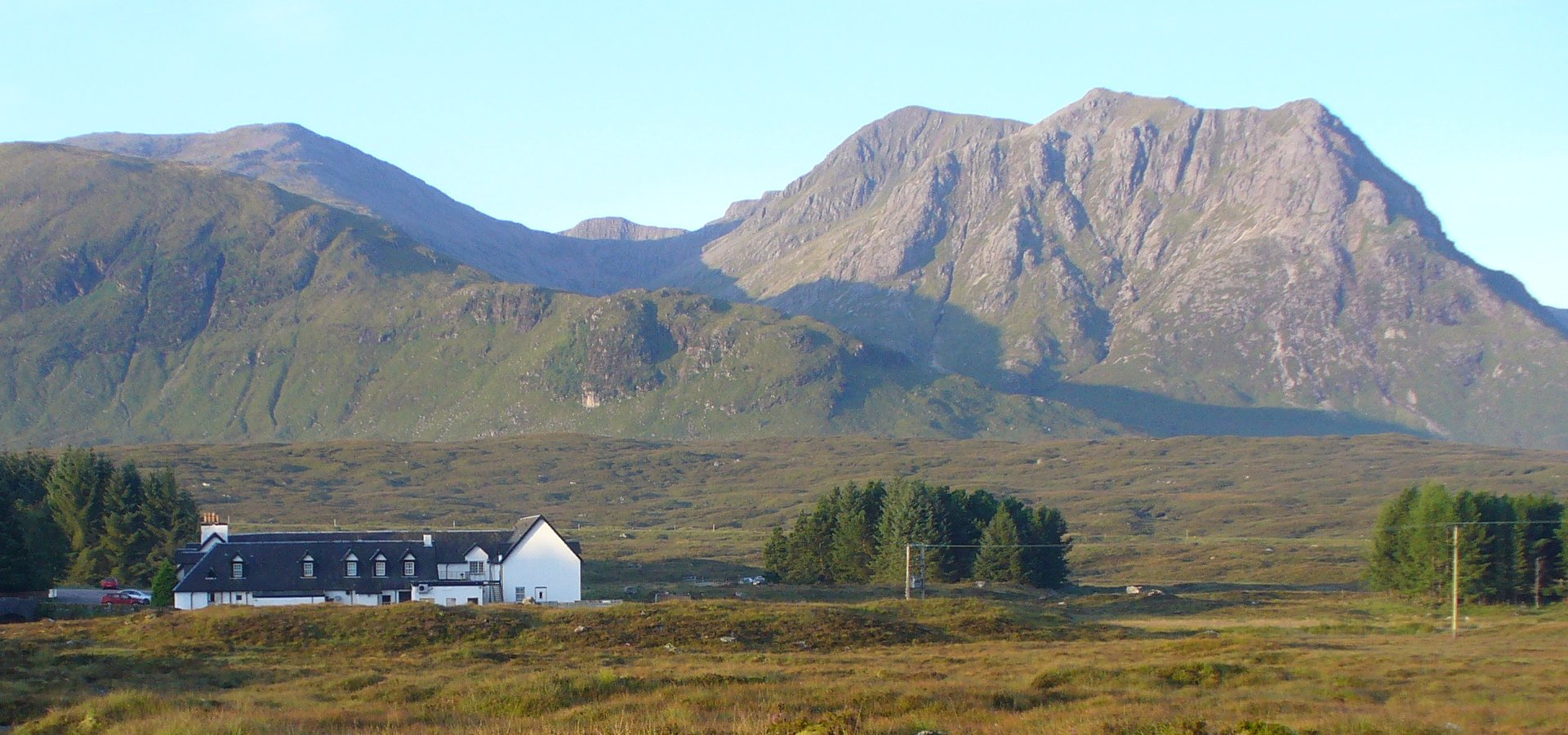
The Kings House Hotel in 2007, (prior to its redevelopment), with Creise marking the northeastern end of Glen Etive.

The Kings House Hotel is a remote inn at the eastern end of Glen Coe in the Scottish Highlands. The inn, which is in an isolated position about 2 km east of Glen Etive, stands on the edge of Rannoch Moor. It faces Buachaille Etive Mor which makes it a popular hostelry with rock climbers. In 2019 the hotel was reopened after a substantial modern redevelopment which involved the demolition of a large 1960s extension. Only the original 18th-century coaching inn was retained and incorporated into the new building.

The inn is called the King's House because it was used as a barracks by the troops of the Duke of Cumberland during the subjugation of the Highlands by the British Army following the Jacobite Rising of 1745.

== History ==
=== Early years ===
The original Kings House, said to be one of Scotland's oldest licensed inns, was built in the 18th century. It was sited at the head of Glen Coe for travellers crossing Rannoch Moor. The strategic military road crossed the River Etive at this point by the inn. The military route, built by the British army in the aftermath of the 1745 Jacobite rising, then headed towards Glen Coe before ascending the Devil's Staircase to Kinlochleven. Parts of the former military route are now used as the West Highland Way.

By the late 18th century, travellers came from Ballachulish to Loch Lomond via Tyndrum. In 1803, the inn was visited by Dorothy Wordsworth, the sister of Romantic poet William Wordsworth, who wrote disparagingly:

Never did I see such a miserable, such wretched place, – long rooms with ranges of beds, no other furniture except benches, or perhaps one or two crazy chairs, the floors far dirtier than an ordinary house could be if it were never washed. With length of time the fire was kindled and after another hour of waiting, supper came, a shoulder of mutton so hard that it was impossible to chew the little flesh that might have been scraped off the bones.

However, 100 years later standards had improved dramatically, as Dundee MP Alexander Wilkie recorded a pleasant stay:

Arriving at Kings House Inn I have a hearty welcome. Tea, my clothes and shoes dried. Next morning after a walk round I go in for breakfast. What shall I have? – grapefruit? What! can I have grapefruit in Kings House; of course I can; and so I have grapefruit, and porridge and cream, and fish, and everything just like a west end city hotel. I tell you I am well looked after and at a charge so moderate that I am almost ashamed of my appetite.

In 1910, the first visitors with motor vehicles began to come to Glen Coe when the stone-shod road was upgraded with tarmac.

=== Later use ===
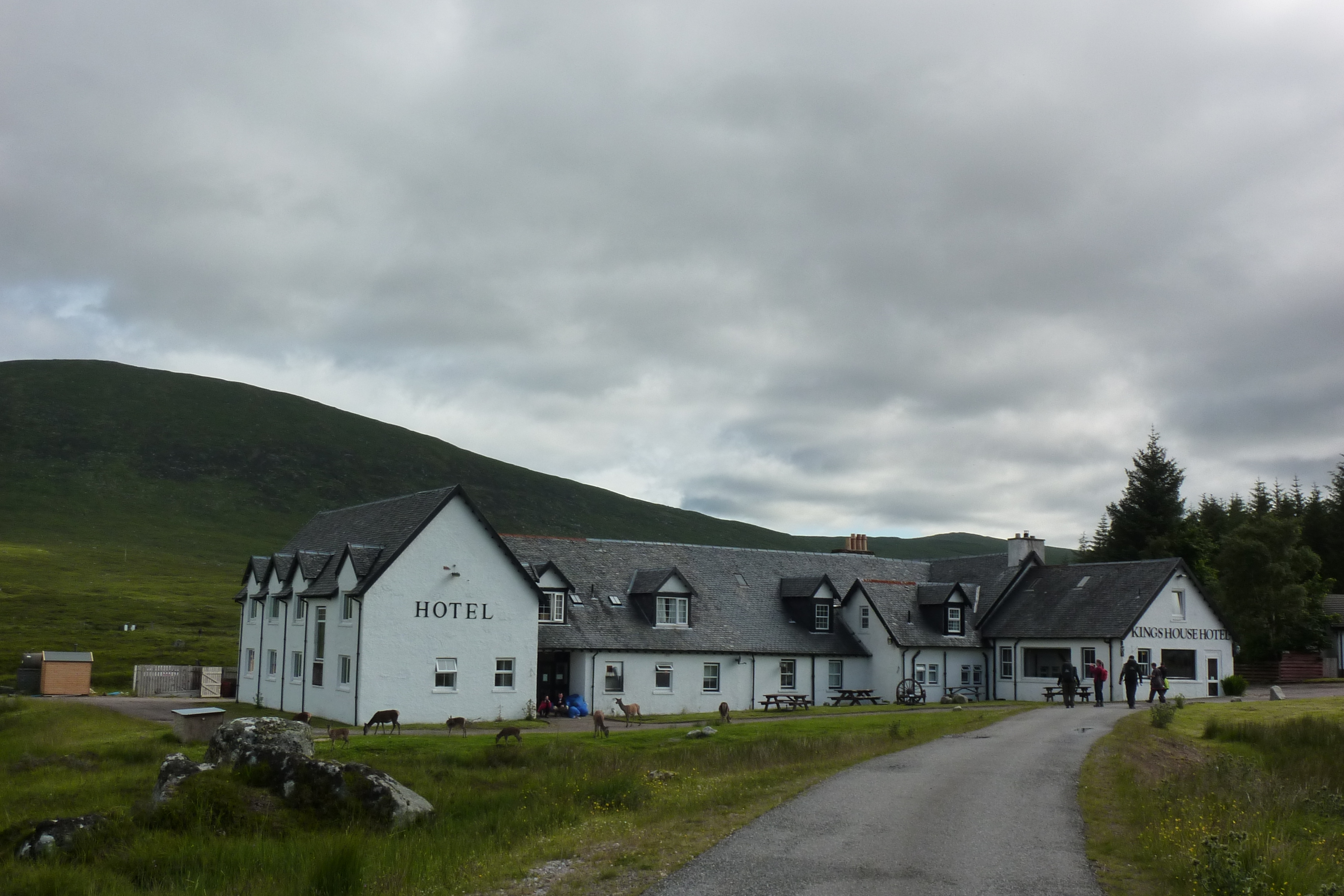
The large 1960s extension (demolished) seen from the West Highland Way in 2012.

In 1959, the Kings House Hotel underwent its first 20th-century modernisation. The work was done so sensitively that the architect, John Thompson ARIBA of Weddell & Thompson, Glasgow, and unusually, also the builders (at the behest of the architect), Thos. Findlay and Sons Ltd of Mauchline, Ayrshire, both received Civic Trust Awards.

The inn continues to offer food and drink. Before its recent refurbishment it had 22 bedrooms with facilities for fishermen, walkers and climbers. In winter, the hotel also caters to skiers from the "White Corries" ski resort just across the road on the mountain of Meall a' Bhuiridh.

Camping on uncultivated ground is generally permitted in Scotland under the Scottish Outdoor Access Code, so it is common for people (especially hikers walking the West Highland Way) to camp in the vicinity of Kings House because the area is open moorland.

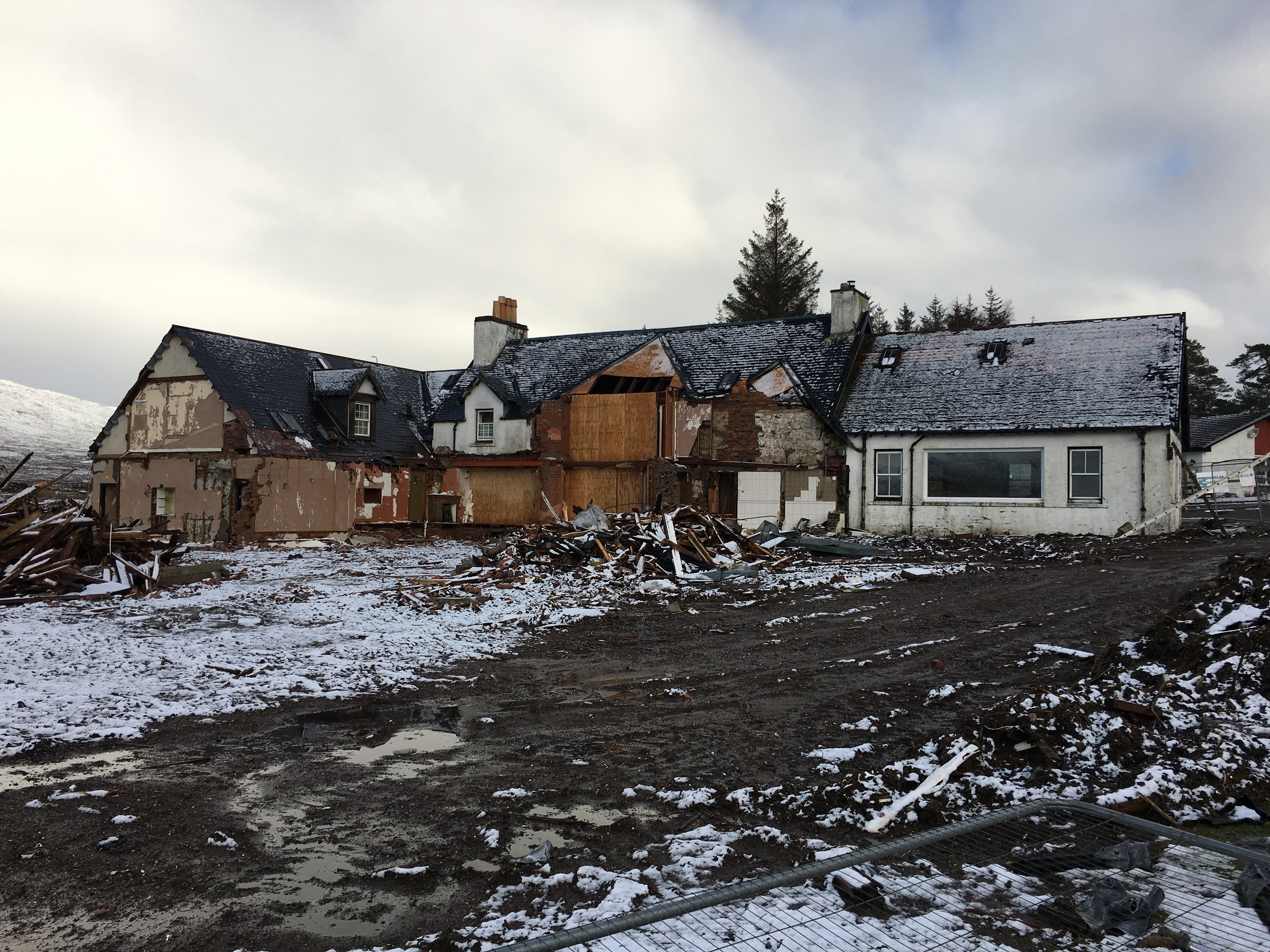
The Kings House Hotel during demolition of the 20th century additions.

=== Refurbishment and extension ===
The property was put up for sale in 2014, and was bought by the adjacent Black Corries Estate. A project team including hotelier Crieff Hydro prepared proposals, and in 2015 they announced a major refurbishment, including removing a 1960s extension and opening a hostel. A further planning application was made in 2017, and on 1 November the hotel closed for refurbishment. Demolition of the old extension began that month, and in January 2018 the new plans were approved despite objections from the John Muir Trust. The new King's House Hotel, refurbished with 57 bedrooms, reopened in February 2019.
