= Irvine Butterfield =

English environmentalist, hillwalker and author (1936–2009)

- Born: August 8, 1936; Farnhill, North Yorkshire, England
- Died: May 12, 2009 (aged 72); Dundee, Scotland
- Occupation: Environmentalist, hillwalker, author
- Genre: Outdoor/Hillwalking guides, Environmentalism

Irvine Butterfield (1936–2009) was an environmentalist, hillwalker and author of several books about mountains and the outdoor environment who took a significant role in the running of organisations with such interests in Scotland. He was a good organiser and volunteered large amounts of his time to causes he believed in.

== Personal life ==
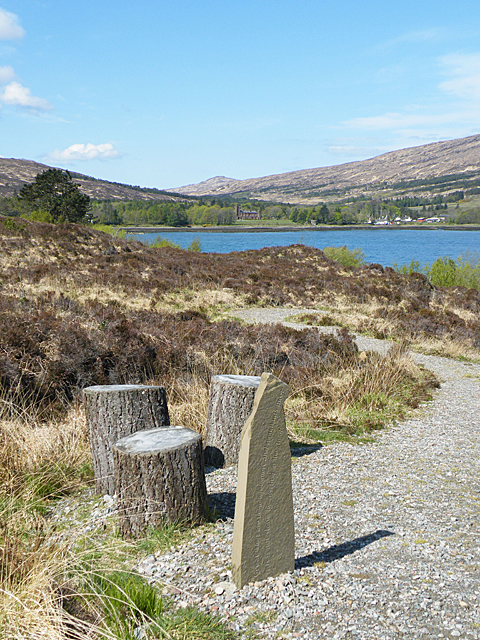
Memorial stone on Rùm

Butterfield was born in Farnhill, North Yorkshire on 8 August 1936 and from his youth he was a keen walker. He worked at the local gasworks and then in the Post Office. In 1957 he moved to London to start his lifetime career with HM Customs and Excise, in 1960 transferring to its whisky departments in Perth, Dundee and then Inverness. It was here that he developed his love for the Scottish hills.

Butterfield was a burly man, not built with the physique for climbing, who never claimed to be more than a hillwalker. He admitted that to climb the Inaccessible Pinnacle "a climbing friend from Manchester hauled me up it".

Butterfield died in Dundee on 12 May 2009, survived by Moira Gillespie, his partner. His ashes were scattered at Loch Clair, just east of Upper Loch Torridon at a place looking towards Liathach, a favourite view for Butterfield; and at Kinloch, near the Dibidil bothy, a simple memorial stone was erected with a quote from William Blake "Great things are done when men and mountains meet; This is not done by jostling in the street."

== Scottish hillwalking books and environmentalism ==
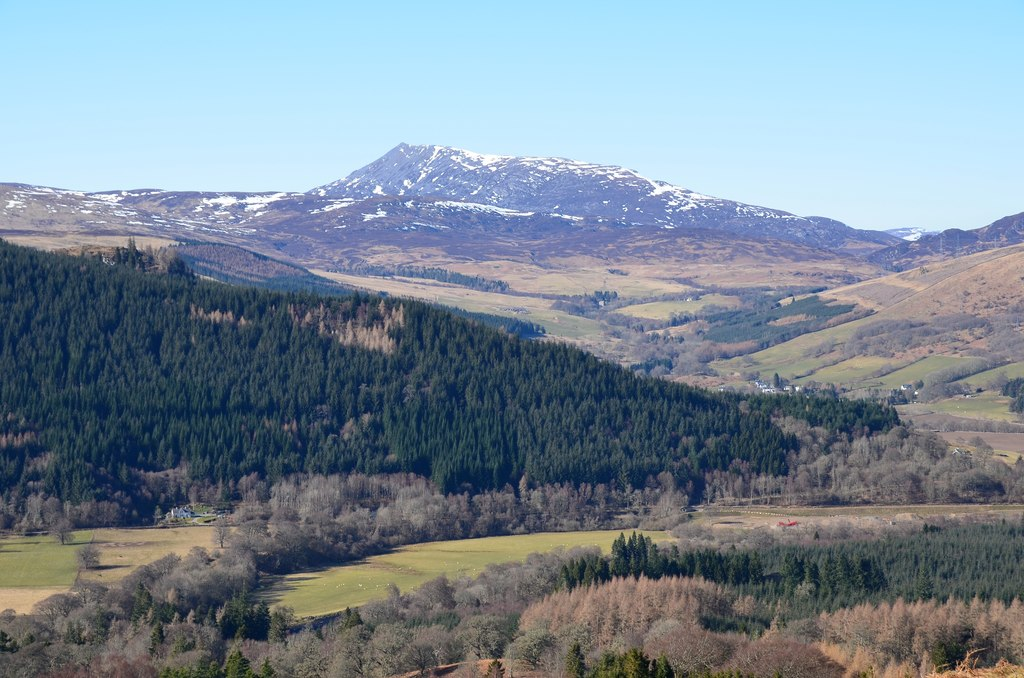
Schiehallion

When in Perth he started climbing the Scottish mountains and became particularly attracted to Schiehallion. An interest in improving bothies, remote highland shelters, led to him becoming secretary of the Mountain Bothies Association from 1969 to 1972. In 1972 he published a book about a project for repairing Dibidil bothy on the island of Rùm, and in 1979 he produced a detailed report A Survey of Shelters in Remote Mountain areas of the Scottish Highlands (1979).

In 1970 Butterfield co-founded the Mountaineering Council of Scotland where he was willing to spend time stuffing magazines into envelopes to post to members and working as a volunteer in the office generally. He gave fund-raising talks and wrote, without payment, articles illustrated with his own photographs to be included in the club magazine. He was in favour of a specifically Scottish organisation, one intended to help individual hill-walkers and not just the established mountaineering clubs.

Butterfield was never a single-minded "Munro bagger" but nevertheless by 1971 he had climbed all the Munros and eventually in 1986 he published The High Mountains of Britain and Ireland describing all the hills over 3,000 feet (914 m) in both countries, described by Mountaineering Scotland as "the bible for hill goers for Munro style hills" and which sold over 50,000 copies. A substantial book of over 300 pages, this was an early example of the genre of magnificently illustrated hillwalking books with maps and details of routes, transport and accommodation. For many readers it proved to be an encouragement to explore remote areas of Britain, particularly Scotland.

Butterfield was a founder member of the John Muir Trust, set up in 1983, and by the time it purchased the mountain Schiehallion in 1998 he was a trustee and gave the royalties of his 1999 book The Magic of the Munros towards the cost. He followed this in 2000 with The Call of the Corbetts (a Corbett is a mountain over 2,500 feet (762 m)) and both books became best-sellers. He was a co-founder and first president of the Munro Society and was a part of the successful campaign to extend the Cairngorms National Park further into Perthshire. He became a director of the John Muir Trust and was the fourth person to be given its Lifetime Achievement Award, after Tom Weir, Adam Watson and Doug Scott.

== Publications ==
- Butterfield, Irvine (1972). Dibidil. A Hebridean Adventure. Irvine Butterfield.
- Butterfield, Irvine (1979). A Survey of Shelters in Remote Mountain areas of the Scottish Highlands. Ian Mackenzie.
- Butterfield, Irvine (1986). The High Mountains of Britain and Ireland. Diadem Books. ISBN 9780906371718.
- Butterfield, Irvine (1987). The High Mountains Companion. Diadem Books. ISBN 9780906371374.
- Butterfield, Irvine; Baines, Jack (1992). A Munroists Log. Ernest Press. ISBN 9780948153143.
- Butterfield, Irvine (1996). The Famous Highland Drove Walk. Grey Stone Books. ISBN 9780951599655.
- Butterfield, Irvine (1999). The Magic of the Munros. David & Charles. ISBN 9780715308509.
- Butterfield, Irvine (2001). The Call of the Corbetts. David & Charles. ISBN 9780715311523.
