= Bridge of Orchy =

Coordinates: 56.5179°N 4.7705°W

Bridge of Orchy: Scottish Gaelic: Drochaid Urchaidh
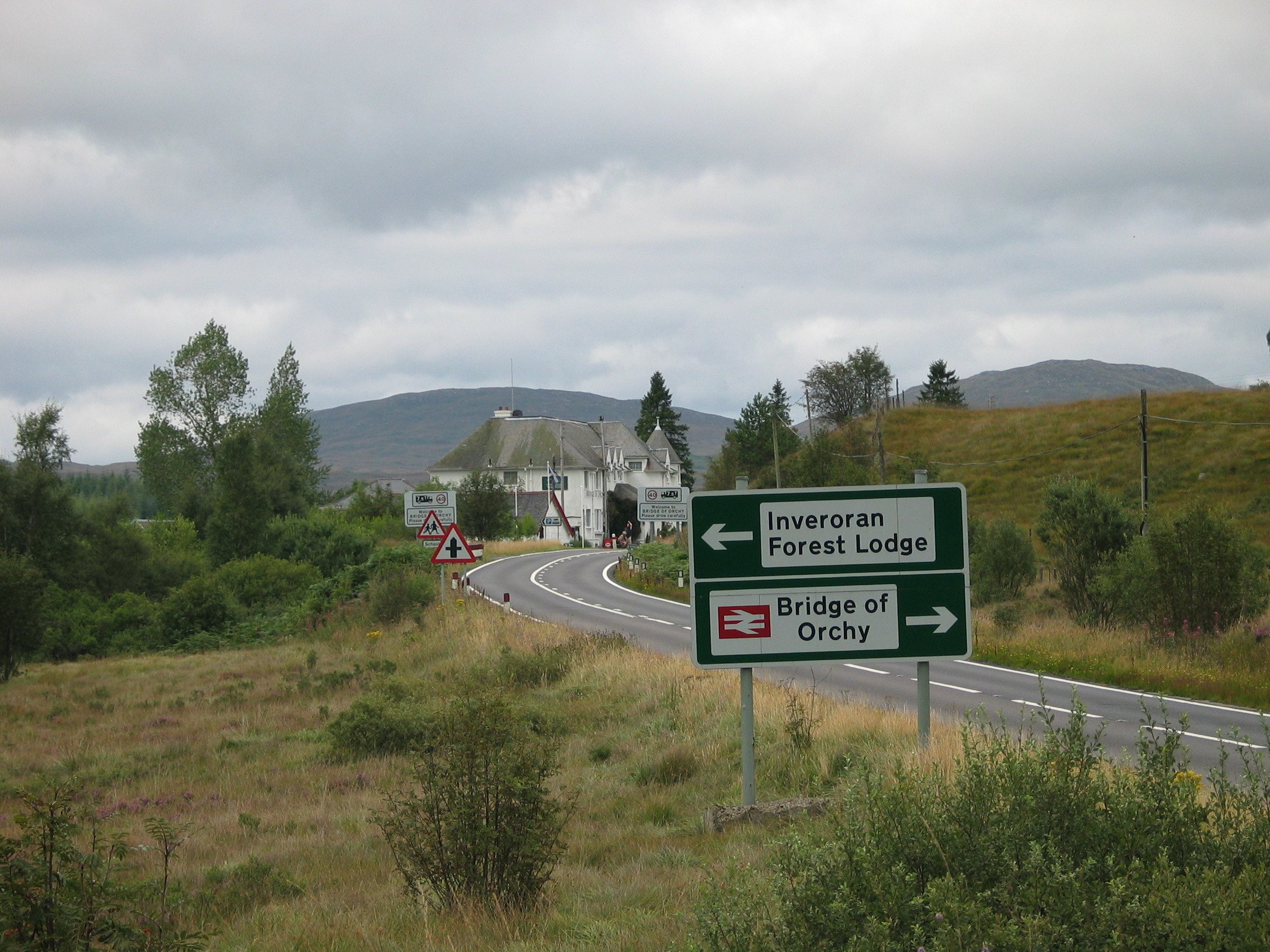
- Bridge of Orchy seen from Beinn Dòrain

- Location within Argyll and Bute
- Population: 152
- OS grid reference: NN297396
  - Edinburgh: 72 mi (116 km)
  - London: 394 mi (634 km)
- Community council: Loch Awe
- Council area: Argyll and Bute
- Lieutenancy area: Argyll and Bute
- Country: Scotland
- Sovereign state: United Kingdom
- Post town: BRIDGE OF ORCHY
- Postcode district: PA36
- Police: Scotland
- Fire: Scottish
- Ambulance: Scottish
- UK Parliament: Argyll, Bute and South Lochaber
- Scottish Parliament: Argyll and Bute

Bridge of Orchy (Scottish Gaelic: Drochaid Urchaidh) is a village in Glen Orchy in Argyll and Bute, Scotland. It is named after the crossing over the River Orchy, which was constructed by British Army during the pacification of the Highland Clans following the Battle of Culloden in 1746. Military roads were built between the Scottish Lowlands and Highlands of northern Scotland to facilitate the speedy movement of Crown forces.

The village, which is dated to 1751, is on the A82 road. The nearby Bridge of Orchy railway station opened on the West Highland Line in 1894.

The 96 mi (154 km) West Highland Way long-distance trail runs through the village. Nearby prominent peaks include the munros Beinn Dorain and Beinn an Dòthaidh. The River Orchy is one of the finest white-water rivers in the United Kingdom.
