= Rannoch Moor =

Boggy moorland and protected area in northern Scotland

- Mòinteach Raineach/Raithneach
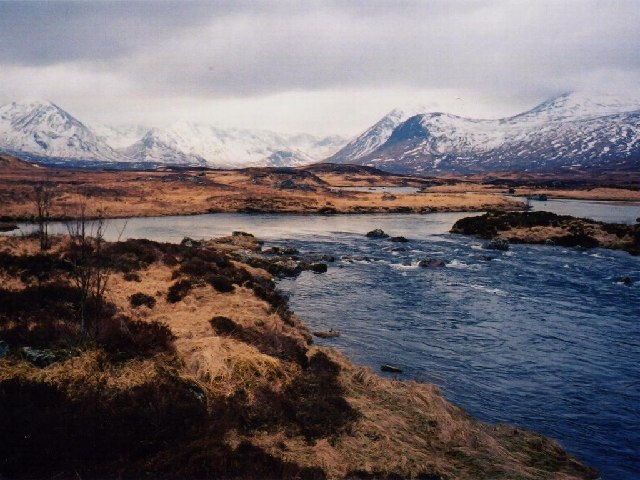
- The Black Mount, seen over the wild landscape

- Location within the United Kingdom Location within Scotland
- Location: West of Loch Rannoch, Scotland, UK
- Coordinates: 56°39′15″N 4°35′37″W

Designations

Ramsar Wetland
- Official name: Rannoch Moor
- Designated: 5 January 1976
- Reference no.: 78

Rannoch Moor (/ˈrænəx/; Scottish Gaelic: Mòinteach Rai(th)neach) is an expanse of around 50 square miles (130 km^{2}) of boggy moorland to the west of Loch Rannoch in Scotland, from where it extends into westerly Perth and Kinross, northerly Lochaber (in Highland), and the area of Highland Scotland toward its south-west, northern Argyll and Bute. Rannoch Moor is designated a Site of Special Scientific Interest (SSSI) and a Special Area of Conservation. Much of the western part of the moor lies within the Ben Nevis and Glen Coe National Scenic Area, one of 40 such areas in Scotland.

It is notable for its wildlife, and is particularly famous as being the sole British location for the Rannoch-rush, named after the moor. It was frequently visited by Horace Donisthorpe, who collected many unusual species of ants on the moor and surrounding hilly ground. Today it is still one of the few remaining habitats for Formica exsecta, the "narrow-headed ant", although recent surveys have failed to produce any sign of Formica pratensis, which Donisthorpe recorded in the area in the early part of the 20th century.

== Geography ==
This expanse was at the heart of the last significant icefield in the UK during the Loch Lomond Stadial at the end of the last ice age. Once the great mass of ice had melted, the subsequent unburdening of the Earth's crust resulted in a continuing rise in the land which is estimated to be of the order of 2–3 mm per year.

== Access ==
The A82 road crosses western Rannoch Moor on its way to Glen Coe and Fort William, and the West Highland Line also crosses the moor. Peat deposits posed major difficulties to builders of roads and railways. When the West Highland Line was being built, its builders had to float the tracks on a mattress of tree roots, brushwood and thousands of tons of earth and ashes.

Corrour railway station, the UK's highest, and one of its most remote being 10 miles (16 km) from the nearest public road, is located on this section of the line at 1,339 feet (408 m). The line takes gentle curves totalling 23 miles (37 km) across the moorland. The desolate and isolated Gorton was a private railway station built near Meall a Ghortain which once housed a school for local railway workers' children, and still serves as the Gorton Crossing engineers' siding.

== In fiction ==
In Kidnapped by Robert Louis Stevenson, protagonist David Balfour travels through Rannoch Moor and the nearby Glen Coe after escaping his kidnapping, following a shipwreck on the Isle of Mull.

In the Highlander novel, The Element of Fire, Duncan and Connor MacLeod track the antagonist Khordas to Rannoch Moor. There Duncan defeats Khordas' female companion, Nerissa.

In the 1999 young adult fantasy novel Fire Bringer by David Clement-Davies, the story's protagonist is named Rannoch.

In the fictional Scrooge McDuck Universe, the seat of the Clan McDuck is located somewhere in Rannoch Moor. The castle known as Dismal Downs plays a pivotal role in some classical comics like The Old Castle's Secret by Carl Barks or A Letter from Home by Don Rosa.

== Filming location ==
The moor was used as a filming location for the television series Outlander, and also for a short scene in the film Harry Potter and the Deathly Hallows – Part 1. Corrour railway station was used for the remote rural location scene in 1996's Trainspotting.

== See also ==
- List of places in Perth and Kinross
- List of places in Argyll and Bute
- List of places in Highland
- The Heart Stone
- The Soldiers' Trenches, Moor of Rannoch
