= Pap of Glencoe =

Mountain in Scotland

Coordinates: 56.68860°N 5.06311°W

- Scottish Gaelic: Sgorr na Cìche
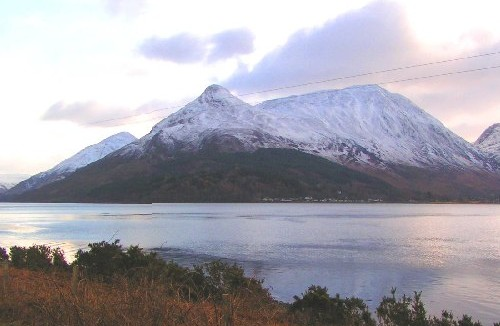
- The Pap, seen from across Loch Leven

Highest point
- Elevation: 742 m (2,434 ft)
- Prominence: 156 m (512 ft)
- Listing: Graham, Marilyn, Breast-shaped hills

Naming
- English translation: Rocky peak of the breast
- Language of name: Gaelic
- Pronunciation: Scottish Gaelic: [ˈskuːrˠ nə ˈkʲʰiçə]

Geography
- Location: Glen Coe, Scotland
- OS grid: NN125594
- Topo map: OS Landranger 41

The Pap of Glencoe (Scottish Gaelic: Sgorr na Cìche) is a mountain on the northern side of Glen Coe, in the Highlands of Scotland. It lies at the western end of the Aonach Eagach ridge, directly above the point where the River Coe enters Loch Leven.

The Pap is so named as it has a distinctive conical shape resembling a female breast (see: pap), particularly when viewed from the west. It forms part of the "classic" view of the entrance to Glen Coe.

The simplest route of ascent starts from the unclassified road between Glencoe village and the Clachaig Inn. A pebble path leaves the road about 1 kilometre (5/8 mi) west of the youth hostel, and passes a white house on the left, reaching the bealach between the Pap and Sgor nam Fiannaidh, from where the Pap may be climbed. The final stretch up to the bealach forms a pathway by small gully; this section is often extremely muddy and boggy. The final 100 metres (330 ft) of ascent require some easy scrambling, and care is needed under winter conditions.

The Pap may also be climbed from the Kinlochleven side, though this is far less common.

== See also ==
- List of mountains in Scotland
- Maiden Paps
- Breast-shaped hill
