= Glen Coe =

Glen in the Highlands of Scotland

Glen Coe National Nature Reserve
- IUCN category IV (habitat/species management area)
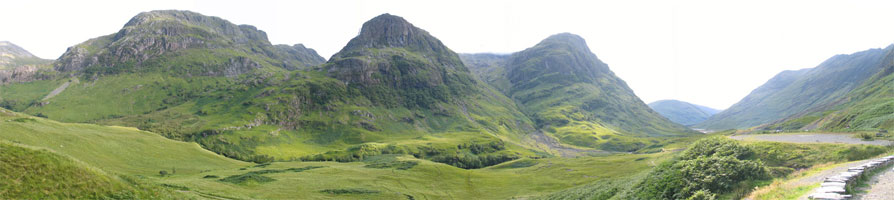
- Panoramic view westwards along the glen towards the Three Sisters of Bidean nam Bian, with Aonach Eagach on the right

- Location within Highland
- Location: Highland, Scotland
- Coordinates: 56°40′04″N 04°59′12″W
- Area: 56.3 km^{2} (21.7 sq mi)
- Designation: NatureScot
- Established: 2017
- Owner: National Trust for Scotland

Glen Coe (Scottish Gaelic: Gleann Comhann pronounced [klan̪ˠˈkʰo.ən̪ˠ]) is a glen of glacial origins that cuts though volcanic rocks in the Highlands of Scotland. It lies in the north of the county of Argyll, close to the border with the historic province of Lochaber, within the modern council area of Highland. Glen Coe is regarded as the home of Scottish mountaineering and is popular with hillwalkers and climbers.

A 2010 review by Scottish Natural Heritage into the special qualities of Scotland's National scenic areas listed the "soaring, dramatic splendour of Glen Coe", and "the suddenness of the transition between high mountain pass and the lightly wooded strath" as being of note. The review also described the journey through the glen on the main A82 road as "one of the classic Highland journeys". The main settlement is the village of Glencoe located at the foot of the glen.

On 13 February 1692, in the aftermath of the Jacobite uprising of 1689, an incident known as the Massacre of Glencoe took place in the glen. Thirty-eight men from Clan MacDonald of Glencoe were killed by government forces who were billeted with them on the grounds that they had not been prompt in pledging allegiance to the new monarchs, William and Mary.

The Glen is named after the River Coe which runs through it. The name of the river may predate the Gaelic language, as its meaning is not known. It is possible that the name stems from an individual personal name, Comhan (genitive Comhain).

== Geography ==
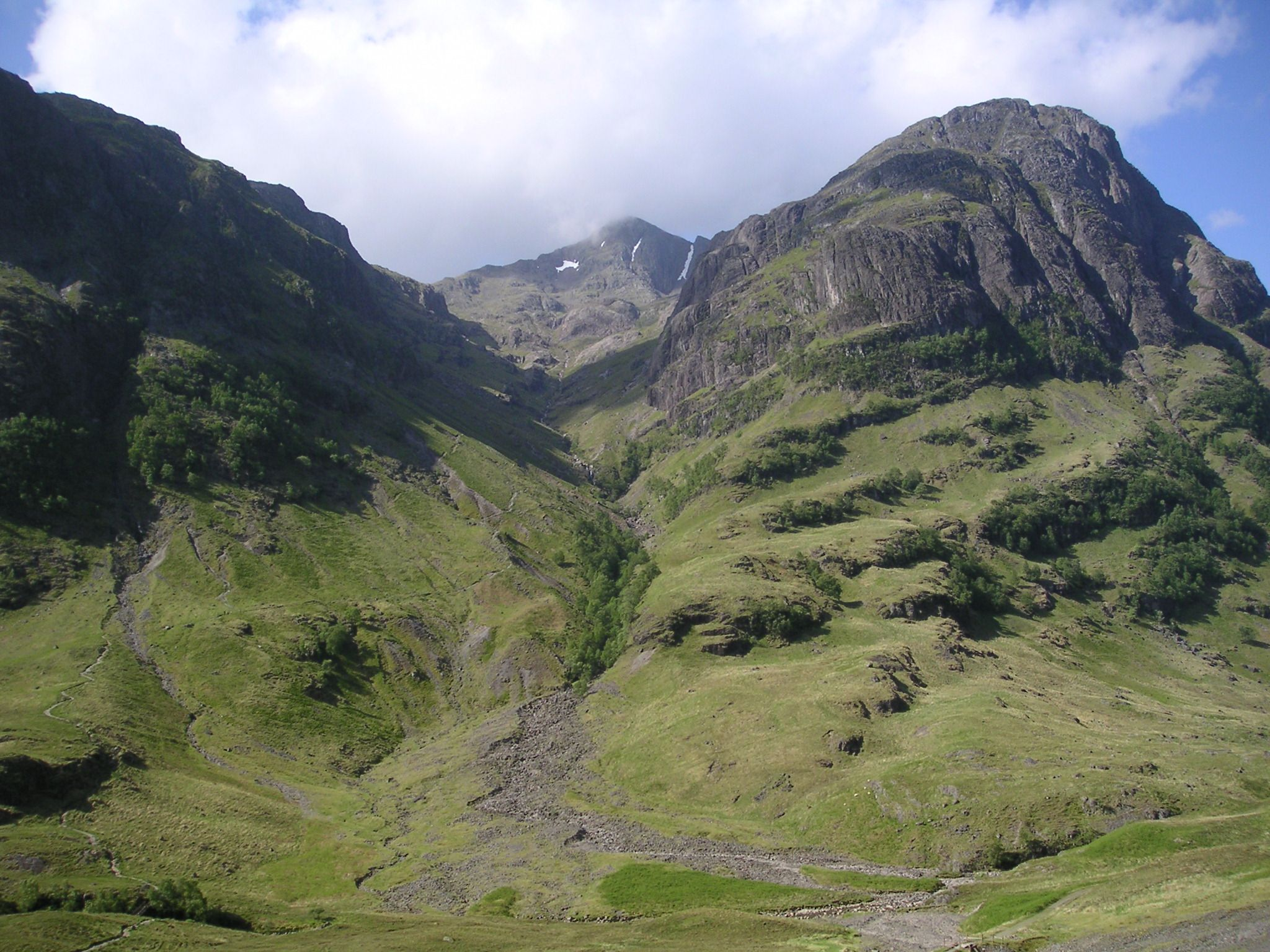
Coire nan Lochan, a corrie of Bidean nam Bian on the southern side of Glen Coe

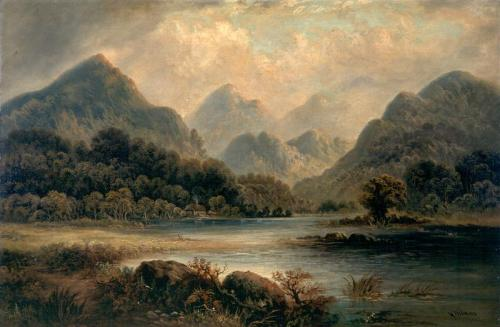
Glencoe by Hugh William Williams, c. 1825–1829

The glen is U-shaped, formed by an ice age glacier, about 12.5 kilometres (7 3/4 mi) long with the floor of the glen being less than 700 metres (3/8 mi) wide, narrowing sharply at the "Pass of Glen Coe".

The entrance to the glen from the east is below the foot of Buachaille Etive Beag just west of Lochan na Fola, from where waters run west to Loch Leven via the River Coe. The river—Ossian's "dark Cona"—passes over waterfalls at the Pass of Glen Coe before flowing down to the small Loch Achtriochtan. Loch Achtriochtan is Loch Trychardan (loch of the three friends or relatives) in Timothy Pont's map of the area. After the loch the river turns north-west, passing through Glencoe village, before flowing into the sea loch of Loch Leven (a salt-water arm of Loch Linnhe) at Invercoe. The area to east of Lochan na Fola is often classed as part of Glen Coe (see for example the location of Glencoe ski centre), but is in fact part of the upper reaches of Glen Etive.

The south side of the glen is marked by a succession of distinct peaks: Buachaille Etive Beag at the eastern end, followed by the Three Sisters, shoulders of the Bidean nam Bian massif which are subdivided by Coire Gabhail and Coire nan Lochan. The name Coire Gabhail (corrie of the bounty, or hollow of capture) refers to former times when the corrie was used by members of Clan MacDonald to hide cattle and other livestock, whether their own or stolen from others. The wide flat glen is well suited for this purpose since from Glen Coe it appears to be a normal v-shaped glen approached only by a steep narrow gorge. Summits in the Bidean nam Bian massif include Stob Coire Sgreamhach, Stob Coire nan Lochan and Aonach Dubh (the third "sister"). By contrast the north side of the glen is a stark wall of mountain, the Aonach Eagach ridge. The ridge is crossed at the eastern end by the Devil's Staircase, an old military road opposite Buachaille Etive Mòr. The western end terminates with the conical Pap of Glencoe (Sgùrr na Cìche), above Glencoe village, at the point where the glen opens out to Loch Leven.

Other than a few scattered farms, the only settlement in Glen Coe is the village of Glencoe, which lies at the western end of the glen close to Invercoe where the river joins Loch Leven. About 2 km (1.2 mi) to the west, on the southern shore of the loch, is the village of Ballachulish, known in the past for its slate quarries, which have been worked since 1693.

== Climate ==
Climate data for Glencoe
Month	Jan	Feb	Mar	Apr	May	Jun	Jul	Aug	Sep	Oct	Nov	Dec	Year
Mean daily maximum °C (°F)	5.4 (41.7)	5.8 (42.4)	8.4 (47.1)	11.1 (52.0)	14.9 (58.8)	17.9 (64.2)	18.5 (65.3)	18.1 (64.6)	15.2 (59.4)	12 (54)	8.4 (47.1)	6.6 (43.9)	11.9 (53.4)
Daily mean °C (°F)	2.7 (36.9)	2.9 (37.2)	5.2 (41.4)	7.5 (45.5)	11.1 (52.0)	14.2 (57.6)	15 (59)	14.6 (58.3)	12 (54)	8.9 (48.0)	5.5 (41.9)	3.9 (39.0)	8.6 (47.6)
Mean daily minimum °C (°F)	0.1 (32.2)	0 (32)	2.1 (35.8)	3.9 (39.0)	7.3 (45.1)	10.5 (50.9)	11.5 (52.7)	11.1 (52.0)	8.8 (47.8)	5.9 (42.6)	2.7 (36.9)	1.2 (34.2)	5.4 (41.8)
Average precipitation mm (inches)	208 (8.2)	139 (5.5)	164 (6.5)	97 (3.8)	86 (3.4)	97 (3.8)	109 (4.3)	127 (5.0)	170 (6.7)	195 (7.7)	191 (7.5)	226 (8.9)	1,809 (71.3)
Source: Climate-Data.org

== Geology ==
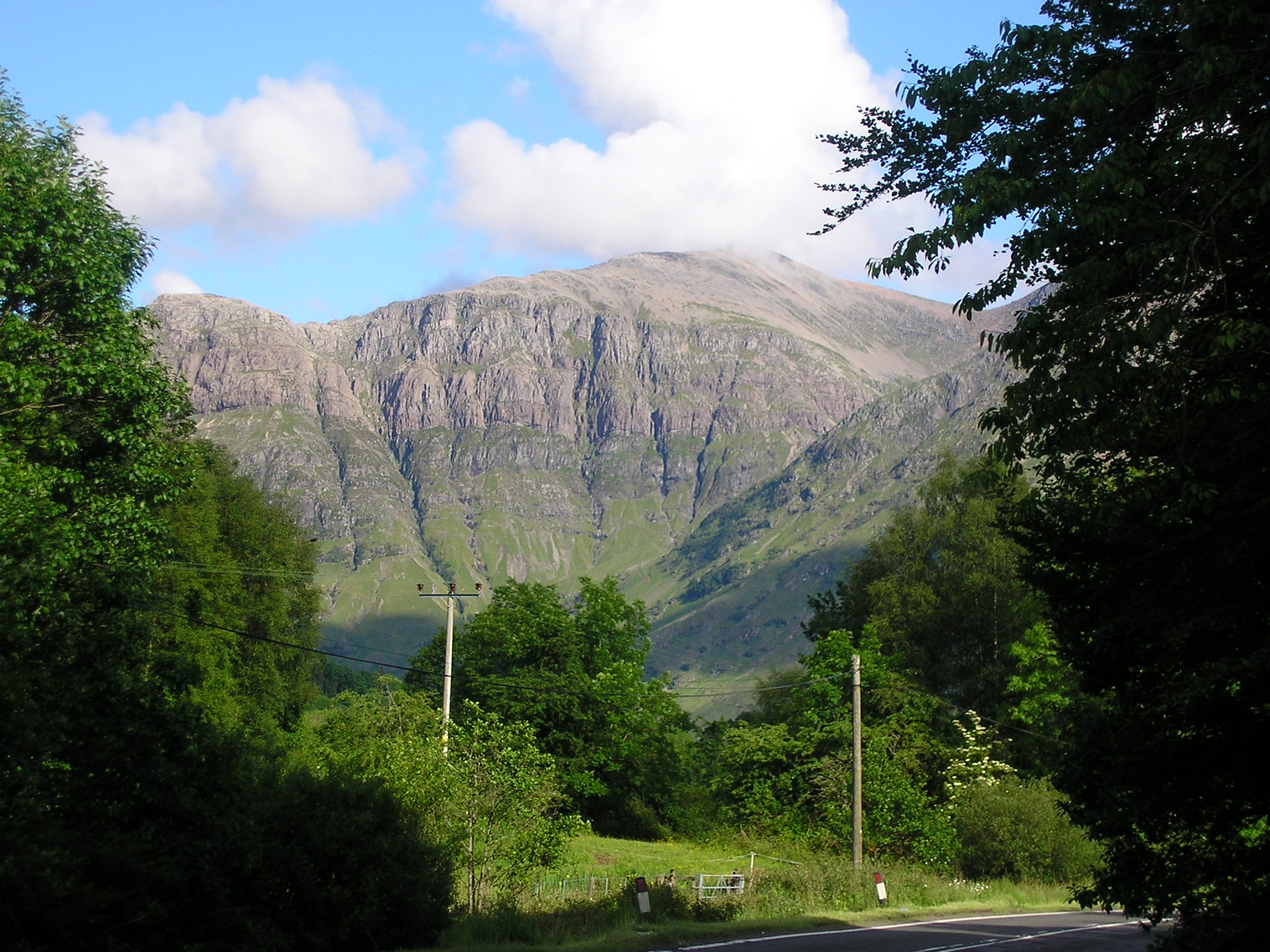
The steep face of Stob Coire nan Lochan

Geologically speaking, the rocks of Glen Coe are the remains of an ancient supervolcano. The caldera forming eruptions took place about 420 million years ago during the Silurian period, and the volcano has long since become extinct. The glen is considered to be one of the best examples of a subsidence caldera, being the place where this phenomenon was first described. A caldera is a volcanic process in which a circular fault allows a section of crust to sink, leading to magma being forced to the surface at the periphery. This sinking allows layers of rock which would otherwise have been eroded to remain visible, can be seen in Glen Coe most strikingly in Devonian volcanic lavas on Bidean nam Bian, as well as at Sgorr nam Fiannaidh, An t-Sron, and in the bed of the River Coe below Loch Achtriochtan. Surrounding the caldera the rocks consists of schist and quartzite with a ring of granite marking the main ring fault.

The landscape was further shaped by the processes of glaciation during the last ice ages, ending 10,000 years ago.

== Flora and fauna ==
Habitats within Glen Coe include birch woodland, moorland and peatbogs. The upland parts of the glen are one of the best habitats for alpine and sub-alpine plants in Lochaber, due to the underlying geology and range of altitude. Typical plants found on the highest slopes of the glen include lady's mantle, Sibbaldia procumbens and areas of willow scrub and Racomitrium lanuginosum moss-heath. In the lower areas of the glen bog myrtle, cotton grass, butterwort, sundew and bladderwort are to be found. There are areas of wet woodland on the floor of the glen: the woodlands are composed of alder and ash, and also provide a habitat for ground plants, such as tufted hair-grass and marsh hawk's-beard. Glen Coe hosts several nationally scarce species of liverworts and mosses.

The peaks of the glen are home to snow bunting and ptarmigan, and the area also supports buzzards and golden eagles.

The region also has an abundance of Highland midges, Culicoides impunctatus.

== History ==
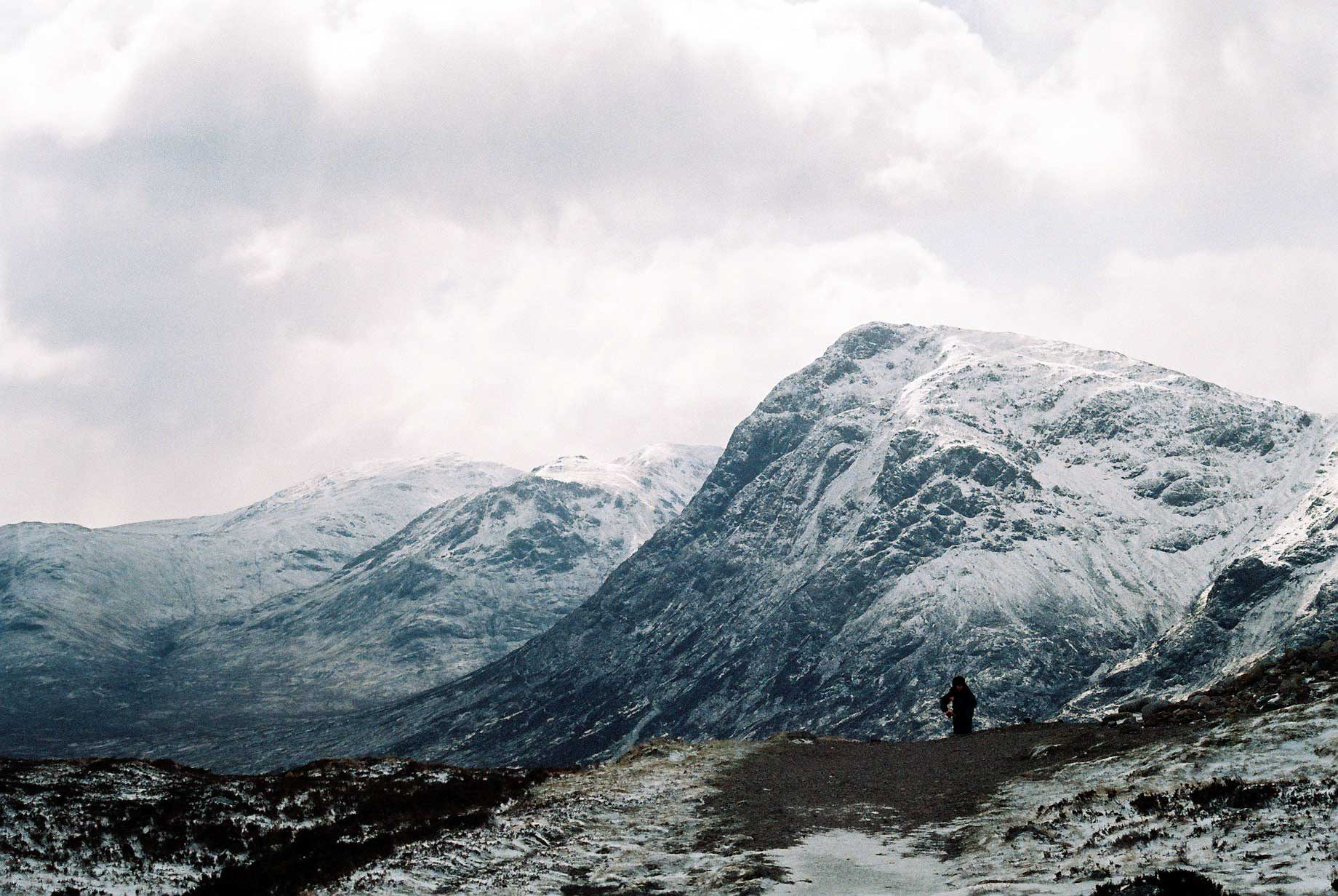
View from the summit of the Devil's Staircase looking south over the east end of Glen Coe, towards Buachaille Etive Mòr with Creise and Meall a' Bhuiridh beyond

The Massacre of Glencoe (Scottish Gaelic: Mort Ghlinne Comhann) took place on 13 February 1692, following the Jacobite uprising of 1689–92. An estimated thirty-eight members and associates of Clan MacDonald of Glencoe were killed by government forces billeted with them, with others later alleged to have died of exposure, on the grounds they had not been prompt in pledging allegiance to the new monarchs, William III of England and II of Scotland and Mary II. The Iona cross was erected in 1883 by a Macdonald in memory of clansmen who perished in the massacre.

Glen Coe was once part of the lands of Clan Donald, though since the ending of the clan structure they progressively sold off their estates. Excavations in 2018-2020 conducted by the National Trust for Scotland have investigated the settlement of Achtriochtan and a reconstruction 'turf-house' was constructed at the NTS visitor centre to allow visitors to experience life in these townships. Further excavations and surveys in 2021-2022 in Gleann Leac-na-Muidhe, directed by Dr Edward Stewart of the University of Glasgow, investigated this shieling landscape, and uncovered features including charcoal burning platforms, peat cuttings, shieling huts, a whisky stilling site and a chiefly hunting lodge. The hunting lodge site was investigated in 2023 by a University of Glasgow Field School directed by Dr Stewart. In 2024 excavations around the settlement of Achnacon, co-directed by Dr Stewart and Derek Alexander of the NTS uncovered further evidence both of the events of the Massacre of Glencoe, and of daily life, subsistence practices and long-distance connections in Glencoe. This site is linked to the settlement of Achnacon, excavated in 2024, by the new Glencoe Greenway Path. Recent work by Lizzie Robertson of the University of Glasgow has explored the creation of soundscapes and audio-installations exploring the complex history, folklore and environment of Glencoe and presenting this to new audiences. These excavations featured in an episode of History Hit, which was launched in November 2024.

Most of the Glen is now owned by the National Trust for Scotland (NTS), whose visitor centre has displays about both the natural and historical significance of the glen. The land was purchased by the National Trust for Scotland in 1935 using money donated by the Scottish Mountaineering Club. It was later found out that most of the money came from the SMC's then chair, Percy Unna. He laid out a number of conditions, known as the "Unna Principles" regarding how the NTS should manage the estate with regard to access and maintaining the wild nature of the land. The building of a visitor centre caused some controversy, as some felt this to be a contravention of Unna's "Principles". The original centre was later closed, and a new one built further west, down the glen on land not part of the original purchase.

The last area of Glen Coe to be owned by the MacDonalds was the area around Invercoe. In 1894, Sir Donald A. Smith (who was later, in August 1897, elevated to the peerage as The 1st Baron Strathcona and Mount Royal) purchased this area and built a country house, Mount Royal. In 2002, Alistair MacDonald of Glencoe made a successful eleventh-hour bid, and purchased the remaining lands of Lord Strathcona from his descendants. Alistair received unsecured loans from just six donors, and immediately set up the Glencoe Heritage Trust, a non-profit-making charitable trust, to secure the heritage of this part of Glen Coe.

In 2017, NTS took out a trademark on the "Glencoe" name following an attempt to trademark the name of another NTS property (St Kilda) by a third party without their knowledge or consent. The Trust stated that it would not prevent local businesses from continuing to use the name; however, they were accused of heavy-handedness when an attempt was made to stop Hilltrek, a company based in Aberdeenshire, from selling a "Glencoe" waterproof jacket. The dispute ended amicably with NTS agreeing to allow Hilltrek to continue to sell the jacket with the Glencoe name.

Hamish MacInnes, veteran of Mount Everest expeditions, climbing consultant for such films as The Eiger Sanction and a mountain rescue pioneer, was a well-known resident of Glencoe. MacInnes developed a new design of mountain rescue stretcher whilst living at Allt-na-reigh cottage near the head of the glen; the cottage later belonged to DJ Jimmy Savile. Following the posthumous revelation that Savile was a child sex abuser there were calls for the cottage to be demolished. In June 2024, the house's current owners were granted planning permission to demolish the cottage and replace it with a new residence, to be named Hamish House in MacInnes' honour. In February 2025, an outbuilding attached to the cottage was damaged by fire.

During the 2020s, several companies started offering the title of "Lord" or "Lady" of Glen Coe to anyone interested online. One such company used the Oscars to advertise themselves by giving away titles of land ownership to such celebrities as Billie Eilish, Benedict Cumberbatch and Jessica Chastain. Such titles, however, do not bestow official nobility or land to buyers. One company, which started operating in 2007, has been accused by several Scotland residents of making a mockery of Scotland's heritage.

== Conservation designations ==
Since 2017 Glen Coe has been designated as a national nature reserve (NNR), and is classified as a Category IV protected area by the International Union for Conservation of Nature. Glen Coe is also designated as a Special Area of Conservation (SAC) and a Site of Special Scientific Interest (SSSI), and the south side of the glen falls within the Glen Etive and Glen Fyne Special Protection Area (SPA). The scenic beauty of the glen has led to its inclusion in the Ben Nevis and Glen Coe National Scenic Area, being one of 40 such areas in Scotland, which are defined so as to identify areas of exceptional scenery and to ensure their protection from inappropriate development.

There have been several proposals for Glen Coe to be included within a national park, mostly recently in 2013. In September 2016 Roseanna Cunningham, the Cabinet Secretary for Environment, Climate Change and Land Reform told the Scottish Parliament that the Government had no plans to designate new national parks in Scotland and instead planned to focus on the two existing national parks.

== Tourism, walkers and climbers ==
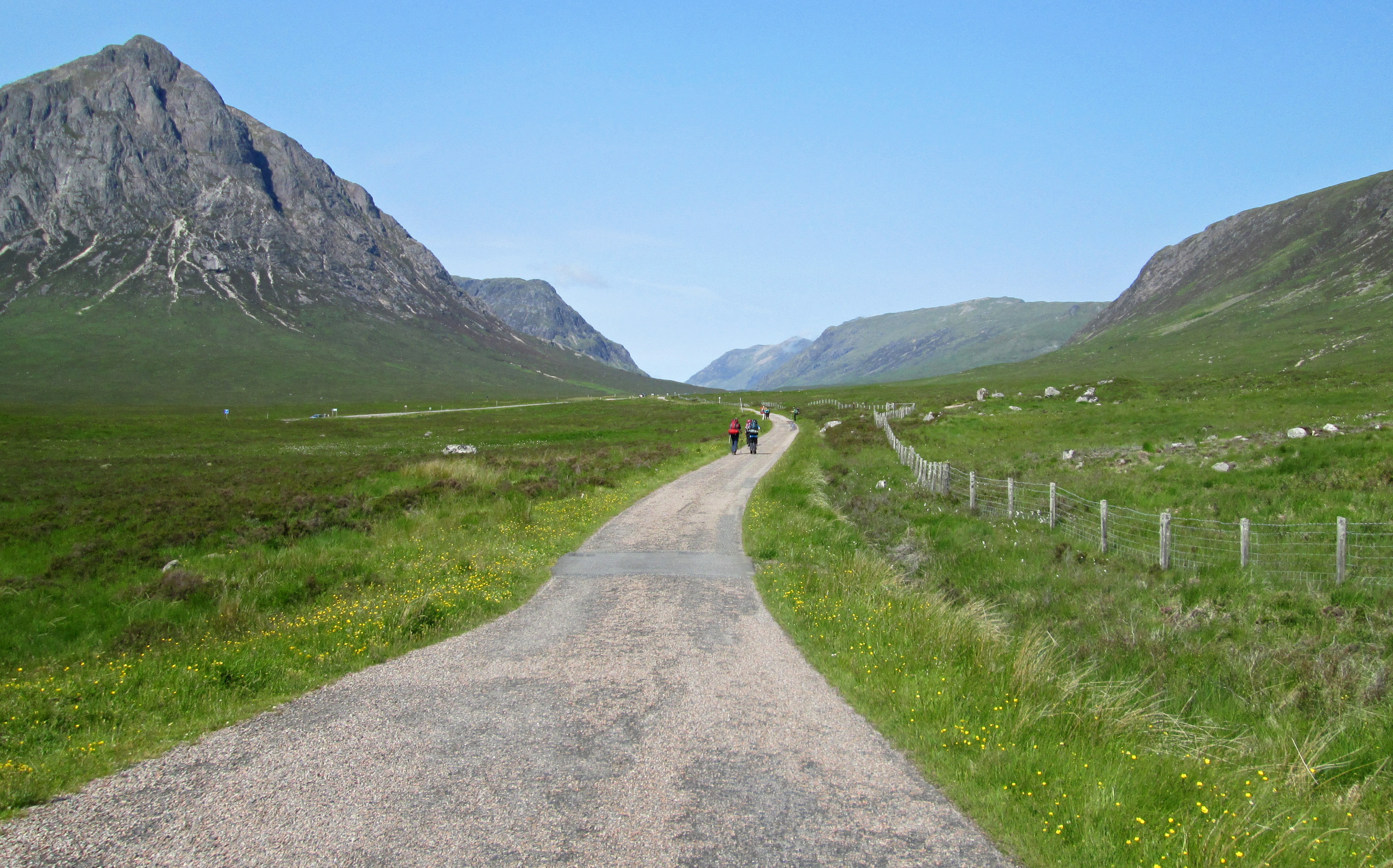
The old road heading west into Glen Coe, now part of the West Highland Way. On the left, Buachaille Etive Mòr and Buachaille Etive Beag, with Aonach Eagach to the right.

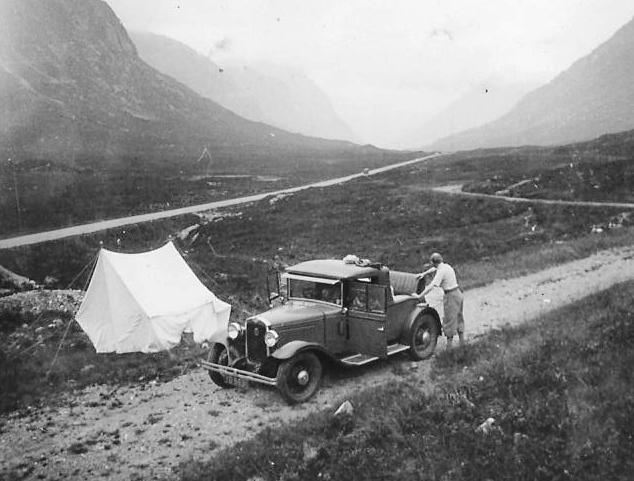
Camping on the old Glencoe road in 1931

Glen Coe is a very popular tourist destination, partly because of its scenic qualities and historical associations, partly because it is on the main road north (the A82), and also because of its attraction for walkers and climbers. It is famous for the quality, and variety of its winter climbing, most of its routes being comparatively easy to access from the main road. Noted climbing venues include Buachaille Etive Mòr (1,018 m), often called simply "The Beuchle", and various routes on the Three Sisters (shoulders of Bidean nam Bian). Other points of interest include the waterfalls at The Study in the Pass of Glen Coe.

For experienced hillwalkers the Aonach Eagach offers challenging mainland scrambles in Scotland. This extended scramble shows two of Scotland's Munro hills, Sgorr nam Fiannaidh (996 m [3,268 ft]) and Meall Dearg (951 m [3,120 ft]). The Aonach Eagach ridge terminates at the Pap of Glencoe (741 m [2,431 ft]). There are also routes on the Bidean nam Bian (1,150 m) massif which forms a complex Y-shaped hill with several lesser tops, including Stob Coire Sgreamhach (1,072 m) which also has Munro status. One way in to these tops ascends from the Pass of Glen Coe up Coire Gabhail (the "hidden valley") to the ridge. Both Buachaille Etive Beag (958 m) and Buachaille Etive Mòr (1,022 m) also offer opportunities to hillwalkers.

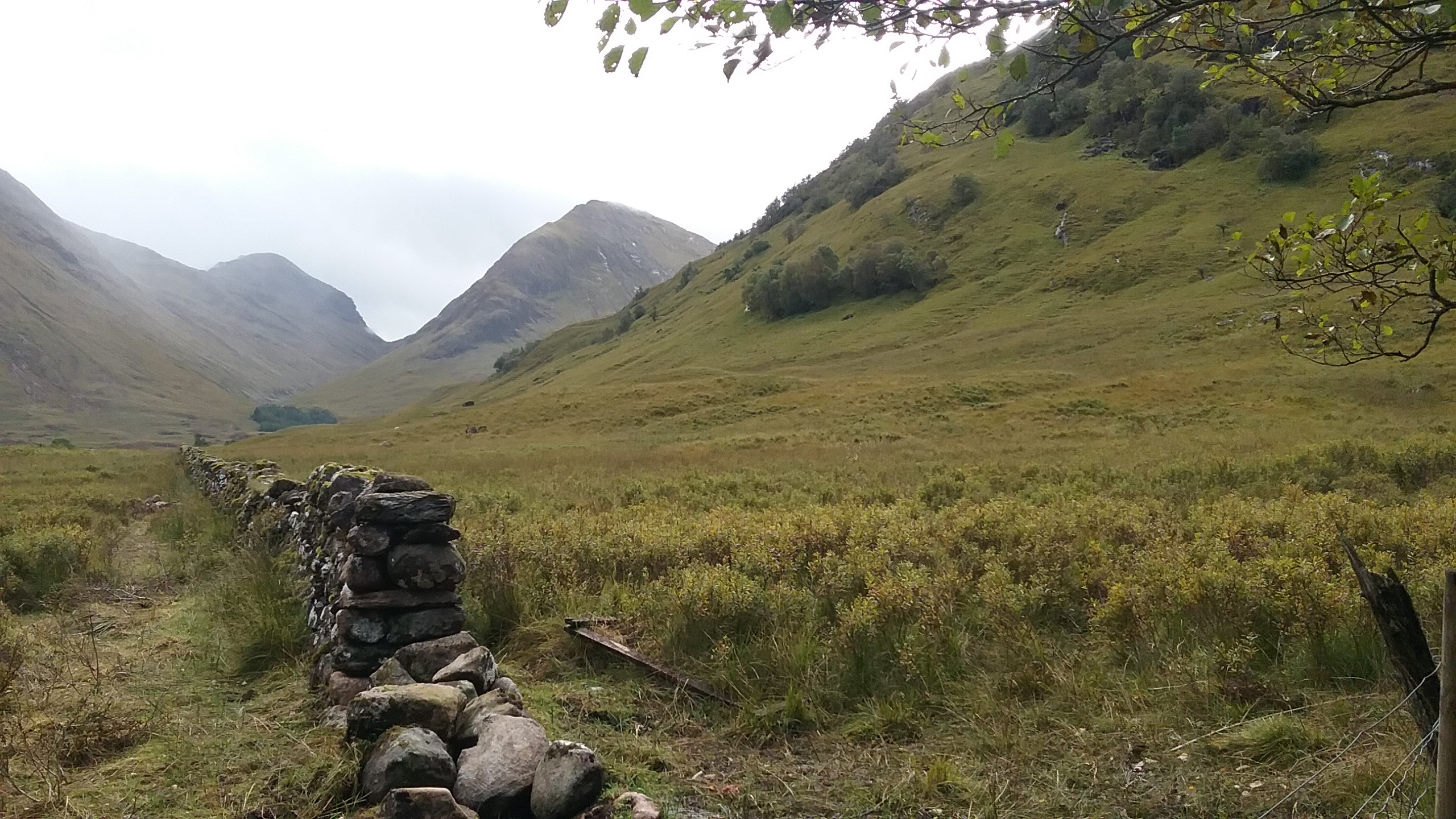
A view of Glencoe from the Glencoe National Nature Reserve in September 2016

Many walkers come to Glen Coe on the West Highland Way following the old military road over Rannoch Moor which crosses the River Etive at the Kings House Hotel. From there it is about 2 km (1.2 mi) to the head of the glen, then about 2 km into the glen the Way ascends the Devil's Staircase, a steep, boulder-strewn "cut" (352 m high) which is part of the old military road and drove road north across the hills to Kinlochleven.

The Glencoe ski centre, also known as the "White Corries", is on the hill of Meall a' Bhuiridh (1,108 m [3,635 ft]) which is on the east side of Glen Etive, outside Glen Coe proper. This centre is popular with locals and is used by many skiers from the Glasgow area as the nearest ski resort at under 80 mi (130 km) from the city centre. It forms part of the "Black Mount" estate, which is based on Loch Tulla which is to the south-east.

The famous Clachaig Inn, a pub much favoured by climbers and hillwalkers, is sited at the bend in the glen about 3 km (1.9 mi) from Glencoe village. A youth hostel operated by Hostelling Scotland is sited about 2 km (1.2 mi) from the village, on the way to the inn, close to an independent hostel (Glencoe Independent Hostel) and the Red Squirrel campsite. The Kings House Hotel, lying about 2 km to the east of the head of the glen towards Rannoch Moor, is former a coaching inn, standing on the main route between Ballachulish and Tyndrum (the route of one of William Caulfeild's military roads). One can also stay in The Glencoe Inn, located in the heart of Glencoe village.

There are three official campsites in and around the glen. Wild camping is permitted in certain areas of the Glen, in accordance with the Scottish outdoor access code and the principles specified by Percy Unna. However, environmental concerns and increasing pollution of the River Coe in the mid-1990s led to a decision to exclude a specific area and prohibit wild camping within that area. The area is to the east of the Clachaig Hotel, from the River Coe to the Aonach Eagach, and east as far as the junction of the Old Military Road and the modern A82. The exclusion has led to improvements being observed in the river and the Clachaig area.

== Cultural references ==
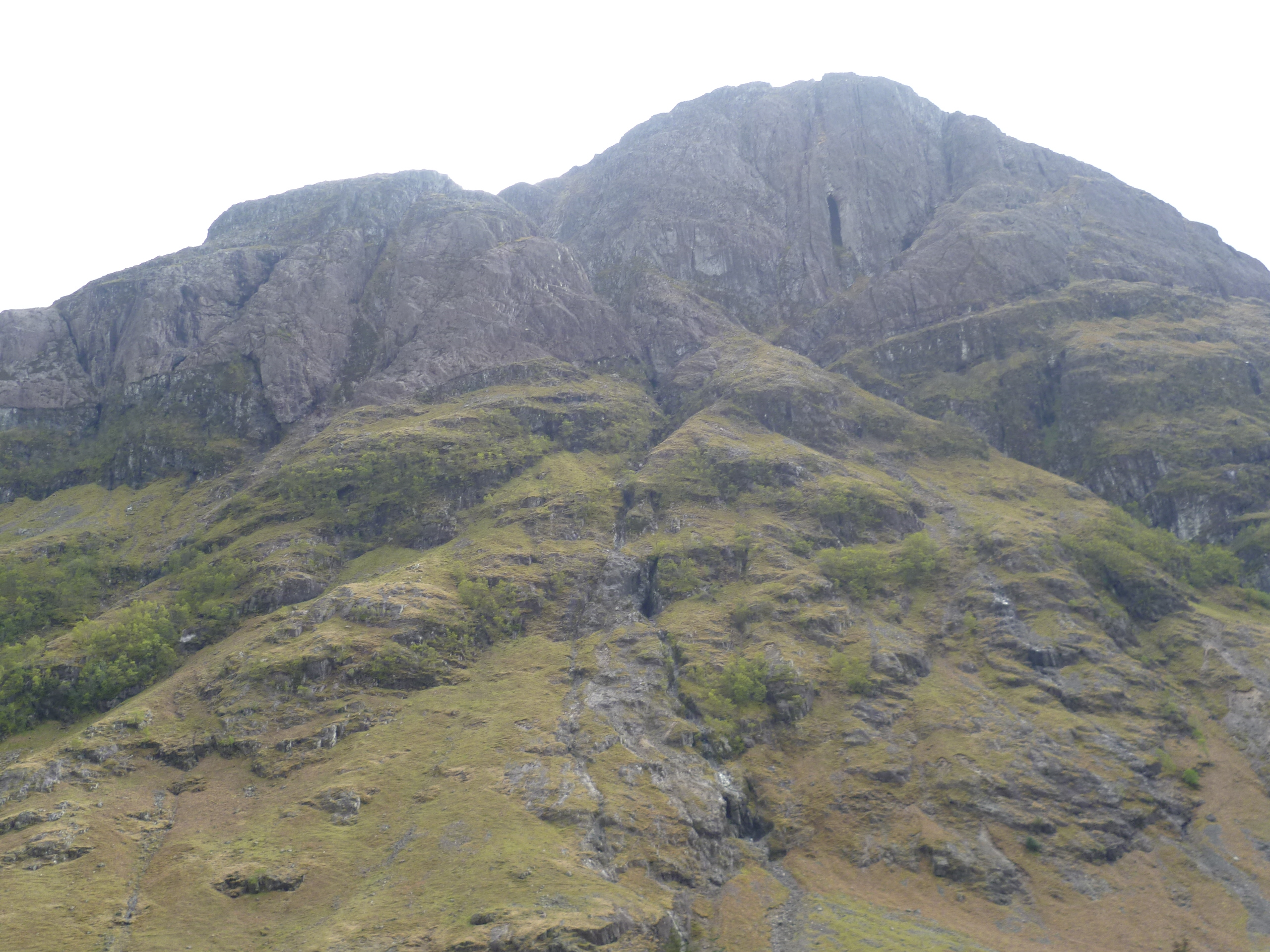
Ossian's Cave (upper right)

Glencoe is supposed to have been the birthplace of Ossian according to John Cameron (1822–1898), a local bard who was also Bard to the Ossianic Society. "In the middle of the vale runs 'the roaring stream of Cona', the mountain of Malmor rises on the south side, and the celebrated Dun-Fionn'—'the hill of Fingal' on the north. Several of the names referring either to the heroes of the Fingalian race, or to their general occupation, hunting, are numerous in the district. Sgur-mam-Fiann, 'the mountain of the Fingalians'; Coe, the name of the river is supposed to be the Cona of Ossian; Grianan Dearduil, 'the sunny place of Darthula'; Acha-nan-con, 'the field of the dogs'; Caolas-nan-con, 'the ferry of the dogs', and the neighbouring country bear similar traces. Morven is the peculiar name of Fingal's domain; an island in Loch Etive is supposed to be named from Usnoth, the father of Nathos; and Etive itself is named from the deer of its mountains." Ossian's Cave on Bidean nam Bian is traditionally the location of his birth.

Sir Donald Smith, high financier and businessman of the Hudson's Bay Company and the Canadian Pacific Railway, owned land near Glencoe and when made a lord, invented the name Strathcona to represent Glencoe. Many places in Canada now bear the name Strathcona after Lord Strathcona.

The Pass of Glen Coe was used as the location for "The Bridge of Death" and "The Gorge of Eternal Peril" in filming Monty Python and the Holy Grail, attracting Monty Python pilgrims. Sets for the third Harry Potter film, Harry Potter and the Prisoner of Azkaban, were built near to the bottom of Clachaig Gully, north of the Clachaig Inn; aerial shots of the glen also appeared in Harry Potter and the Order of the Phoenix and Harry Potter and the Half-Blood Prince. There are some shots of the eastern glen, including Buachaille Etive Mòr in the Bollywood film Kuch Kuch Hota Hai, and in the James Bond film Skyfall (which was mainly set in Glen Etive), although the majority of the filming for Bond's Scottish home was in Southern England.

There is a folk museum in Glencoe village. It is currently closed for redevelopment, and expected to re-open in the summer of 2027..

== See also ==
- 2009 Buachaille Etive Mòr avalanche
- Ben Nevis
- Beinn a' Chrulaiste
- Buachaille Etive Mòr
- "Chì mi na mòrbheanna", a famous Gaelic song about Glen Coe
- Mountains and hills of Scotland
- Scottish Highlands
- Three Sisters (Glen Coe)
