= Meall Dearg =

Meall Dearg, meaning 'Red Hill' in Gaelic, may refer to several peaks in Scotland:

- Meall Dearg (Aonach Eagach), a 953 m Munro forming the western end of the Aonach Eagach
- Meall Dearg (Perth and Kinross), a 690 m Graham and Marilyn above Glen Cochill in Perth and Kinross; see List of Grahams (mountains)
