= Glencoe Ski area =

Ski area in Scotland

Coordinates: 56°37′55″N 4°49′35″W

Glencoe Mountain Resort
- Interactive map of Glencoe Mountain Resort
- Location: Glencoe, Scotland, PH49 4HZ
- Nearest city: Glasgow 82 miles (132km) Fort William 29 miles (47 km) Inverness 95 miles (153 km)
- Status: Open
- Vertical: 2,388 ft (728 m)
- Top elevation: 3,635 ft (1,108 m)
- Base elevation: 1,247 ft (380 m)
- Trails: 24 total; 9 easy; 6 intermediate; 5 difficult; 4 advanced
- Longest run: 2.6 miles (4 km)
- Lift system: 3 chairlifts, 6 surface
- Lift capacity: 6000 per hour
- Snowfall: 150 in (380 cm)
- Snowmaking: snow factory
- Night skiing: no
- Website: Glencoe Mountain

Glencoe Mountain Resort (previously known as The White Corries Ski Centre) is a ski area that operates on the mountain Meall a' Bhuiridh in some of the most dramatic mountain scenery in Scotland. The ski area is located adjacent to the A82 road, 13 miles from the village of Glencoe, Highland, approximately 29 miles south of Fort William and 92 miles north of Glasgow.

== History ==
Glencoe is the oldest alpine ski area in Scotland, the first ski tow being installed in 1955 at a cost of about £50,000.

The ski area currently has eight lifts serving some of Scotland’s longest and steepest pistes. The Coire Pollach non-detachable Poma surface / drag lift was added to the mountain for the start of the 2016 season. The current access chairlift was renovated around this time, with new chairs and engine drive, as were the cafe facilities at the base of the mountain, accompanied by a new ticketing system and a new rental building. Installation of the new Rannoch 3 person chairlift is complete, and opening for the first time in the 2022/23 winter.

The main resort building suffered a fire on Christmas Day 2019, which necessitated the demolition of the main cafe, ticket office and rental department. Temporary replacement structures were erected, including the 'White Corries Cafe' at the bottom of the car park. The new 'White Corries Cafe' opened in March 2022, and most temporary buildings were removed at that time. The ticket office remains in a temporary building until further notice.

== Car park and other facilities ==
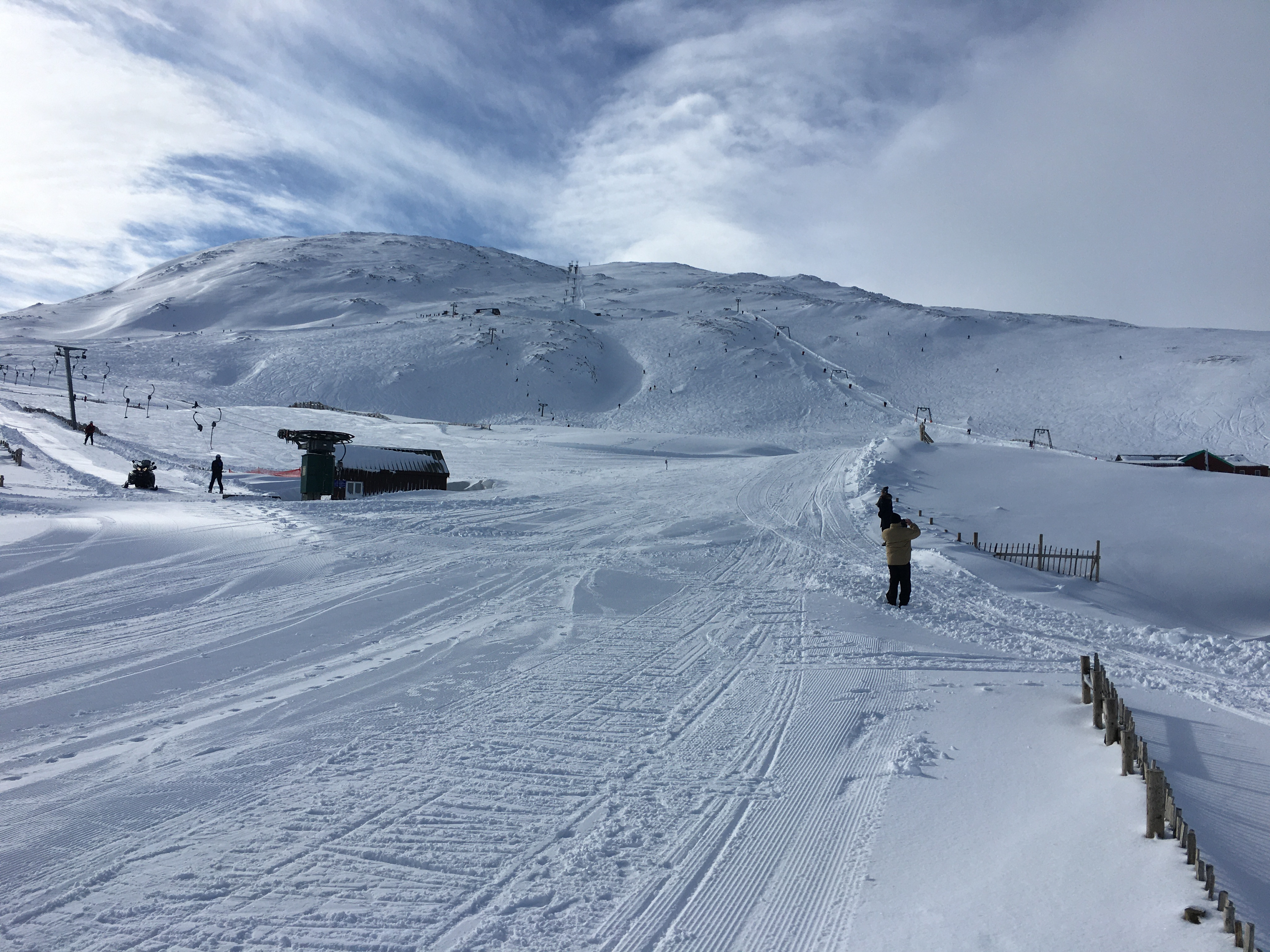
Plateau area of the mountain

The car park is at the base of Meall a' Bhuiridh at 1,247 ft (380 m). Snowsports facilities are reached via the Access chair lift which lifts to the plateau station at 2,362 ft (720 m). During the winter, snowsports lessons, sledging and lift accessed hiking is available. The chairlift runs throughout the year, providing access to the mountain in summer for tourists, climbers, hikers and mountain bikers.

A range of cross country and downhill mountain bike trails and bike, helmet and armour rental are available as are snow-tubing sessions on the plastic slope at the base of the mountain. The UK's highest disc golf course is due to open in the summer of 2023, accessed via the main access chairlift.

== Year-round operations ==
Onsite accommodation is available year-round in micro-lodges, electric hookups and camping plots. Accommodation is also available in nearby Glencoe, Ballachulish, North Ballachulish, crianlarich and Fort William.

== Transport ==
Citylink buses provide public transport to the ski area, stopping on the A82 main road.
