= Glencoe, Highland =

Village in the Lochaber area of Scotland

Coordinates: 56.68282°N 5.10598°W

Glencoe: Scottish Gaelic: A’ Chàrnaich
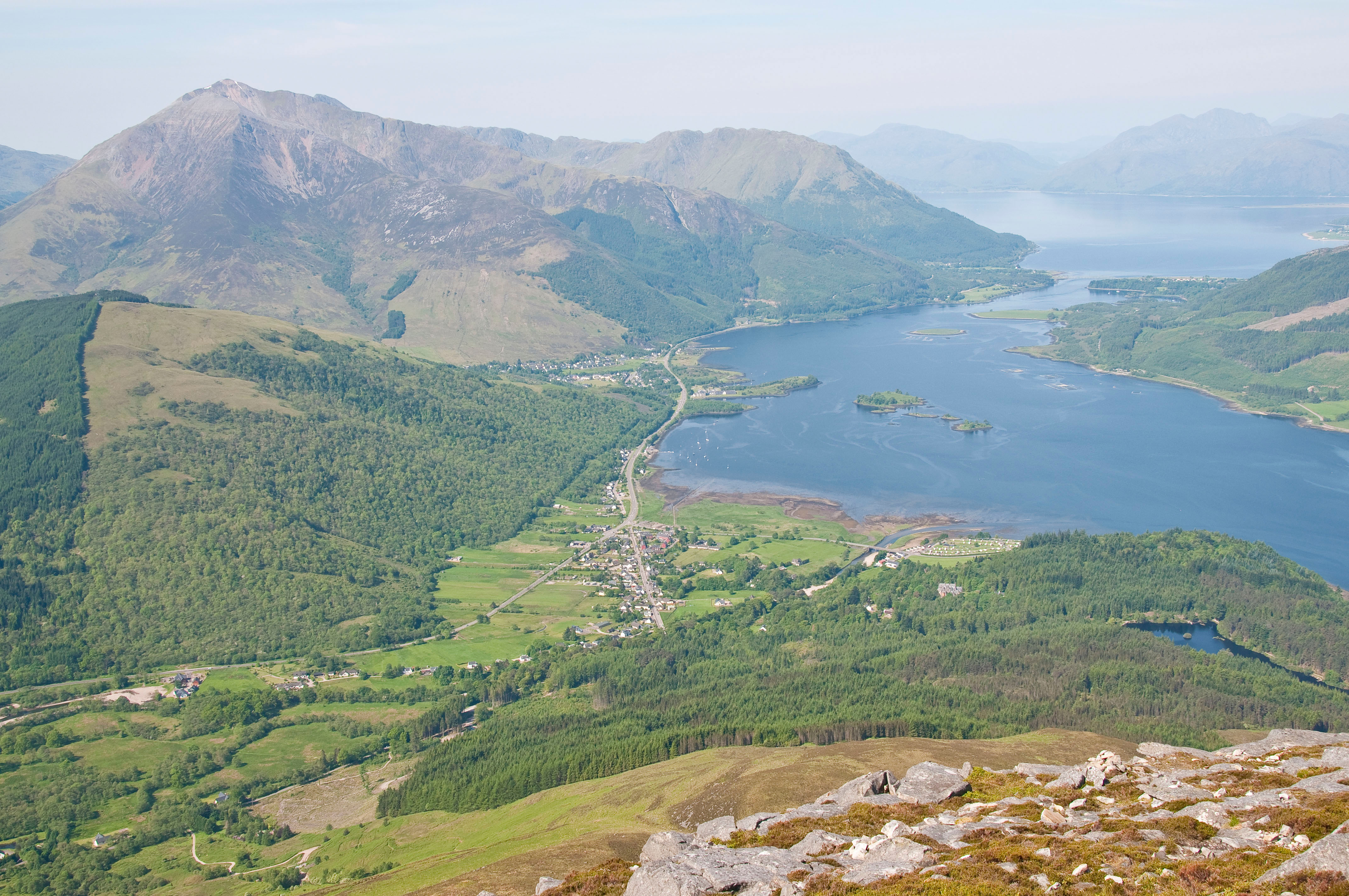
- Glencoe village from the summit of the Pap of Glencoe

- Location within the Lochaber area
- Population: 374
- OS grid reference: NN098588
- Council area: Highland
- Lieutenancy area: Inverness
- Country: Scotland
- Sovereign state: United Kingdom
- Post town: Ballachulish
- Postcode district: PH49 4
- Police: Scotland
- Fire: Scottish
- Ambulance: Scottish
- UK Parliament: Argyll, Bute and South Lochaber
- Scottish Parliament: Skye, Lochaber and Badenoch

Glencoe or Glencoe Village (Gaelic: A’ Chàrnaich) is the main settlement in Glen Coe in the Lochaber area of the Scottish Highlands. It lies at the north-west end of the glen, on the southern bank of the River Coe where it enters Loch Leven (a salt-water loch off Loch Linnhe).

The village falls within the Ross, Skye and Lochaber part of the Highland council area for local government purposes. It is part of the registration county of Argyll and the lieutenancy area of Inverness for ceremonial functions.

The use of the term "Glencoe Village" is a modern one, to differentiate the settlement from the glen itself.

== History ==
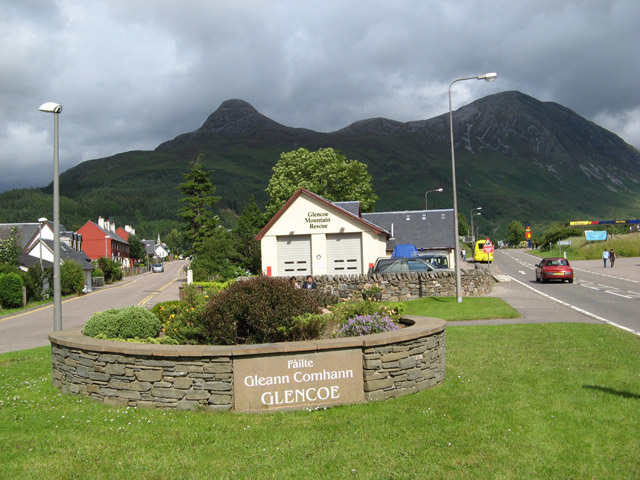
Glencoe from the west

The village is on the site of the Massacre of Glencoe in 1692, in which 38 members of the Clan MacDonald of Glencoe were killed by forces acting on behalf of the government of King William III following the Glorious Revolution. Treachery was involved, since the Clan had fed the soldiers and given them shelter for nearly two weeks before they turned on their hosts. The glen is sometimes poetically referred to as "The Weeping Glen", in reference to this incident, although the Glencoe name was already in place well before the time of the massacre, as the Gaelic Gleann Comhann, the Comhann element of which may predate the Gaelic language, its meaning being uncertain.

The village occupies an area of the glen known as Carnoch. Native Gaelic speakers who belong to the area always refer to the village itself as A' Chàrnaich, meaning "the place of cairns". Even today there is Upper Carnoch and Lower Carnoch. There was formerly a small hospital at the southern end of the village just over an arched stone bridge. This has since been converted into an upmarket guest house, and the nearest hospital is now the Belford in Fort William, some 26 kilometres (16 miles) away.

== Culture and community ==
Within Carnoch there is a small village shop, a Scottish Episcopal Church, Glencoe Folk Museum, Post Office, Glencoe Mountain Rescue Team centre, an outdoor centre, a number of bed and breakfast establishments, and a small primary school. The small Museum was started after a resident discovered "a cache of 200-year-old swords and pistols hidden there from the British Redcoats after the disastrous battle of Culloden".

Several eating establishments are around including the Glencoe Hotel, Glencoe Cafe and The Clachaig Inn. Glencoe is also a popular location for self-catering holidays; with many chalets, cottages and lodges available for weekly and short break rental. Also located in the village, but along the A82, is the Glencoe Visitor Centre, run by the National Trust for Scotland. This modern (constructed in 2002) visitor centre houses a coffee shop, store, and information centre. Nearby memorials sites are the Celtic cross at the Massacre of Glencoe Memorial, and plaque at Henderson Stone (Clach Eanruig).

The village is surrounded by spectacular mountain scenery and is popular with serious hill-walkers, rock and ice climbers. Travel writer Rick Steves describes the area as exhibiting "the wild, powerful and stark beauty of the Highlands... dramatic valley, where the cliffsides seem to weep with running streams when it rains". The area has been seen in numerous films, including Harry Potter and the Prisoner of Azkaban as the home of Hagrid, and the 2012 James Bond film Skyfall.

In Ian Fleming's original novel On Her Majesty's Secret Service James Bond tells Sir Hilary Bray, a genealogist with the Royal College of Arms, his father was from the Highlands, near Glencoe and in Fleming's other novel You Only Live Twice M's obituary for Bond also mentions his father, Andrew Bond, was from Glencoe. In Skyfall, we see in James Bond's passport he was born in Glencoe.

Well-known residents include Hamish MacInnes, mountaineer and inventor of the MacInnes Stretcher.

== See also ==
- 2009 Buachaille Etive Mòr avalanche
- Glencoe Lochan
