= River Coe =

River in Scotland

Coordinates: 56°41′N 5°06′W

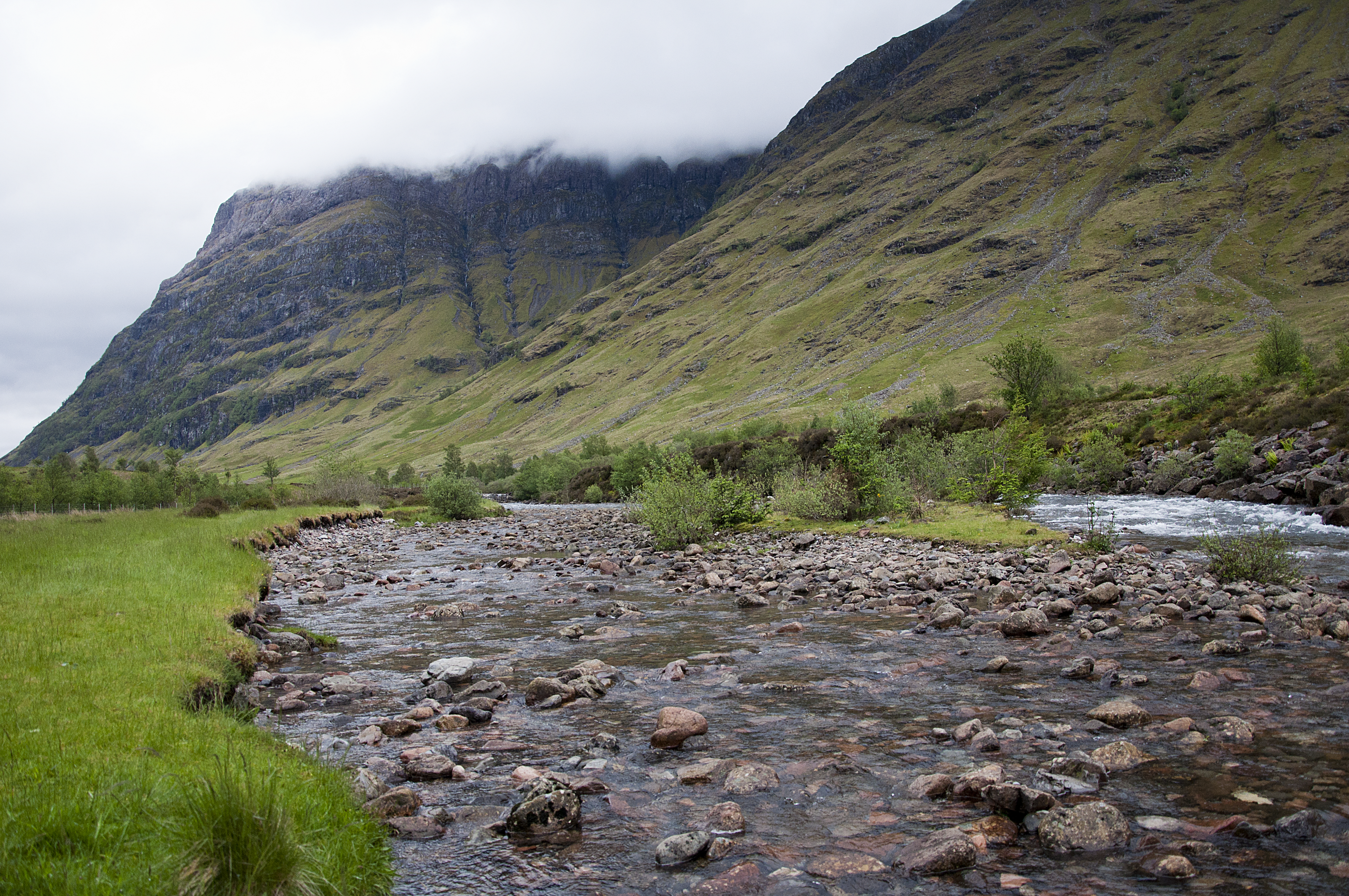
River Coe with Meall Mòr (right) and Aonach Dubh

The River Coe (Scottish Gaelic: Comhan) rises at the north-eastern base of Buachaille Etive Beag in Scotland and flows west along Glen Coe. After dramatic waterfalls at the Pass of Glen Coe, it runs through the small Loch Achtriochtan before it turns north west. It then runs past the site of the Massacre of Glencoe and passes through Glencoe village, shortly before flowing into the sea loch of Loch Leven (a salt-water arm of Loch Linnhe) at Invercoe.

The Bridge of Coe, which crosses the river in Glencoe village, is category B listed.
