= Clachaig Inn =

Hotel and pub in Highland, Scotland

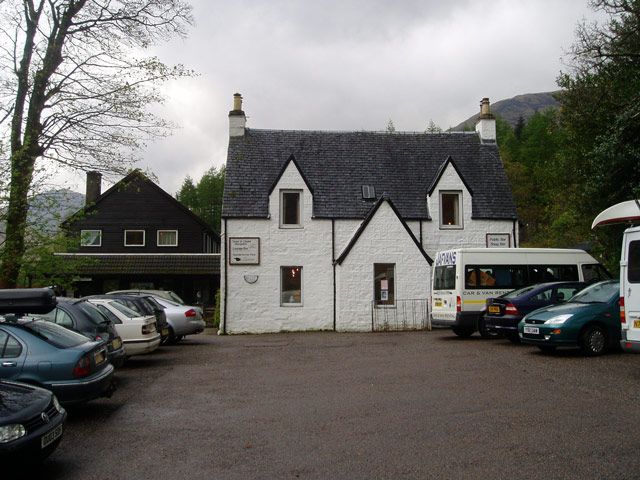
- The Clachaig Inn

- Location within Highland Clachaig Inn (Scotland)

General information
- Type: Pub and inn
- Location: Glen Coe, Lochaber, Highland, Scotland
- Coordinates: 56.66442°N 5.05951°W
- Current tenants: Clachaig Inn
- Opened: c.16th century

The Clachaig Inn is a hotel and pub in Glen Coe, Lochaber, Highland, Scotland. It is popular with walkers and climbers who come to visit the surrounding mountains.

== Background ==
The inn is sited towards the western end of the glen at grid reference NN126567, about 3 km (1.9 mi) southeast of the modern Glencoe village, on the old road just to the north of the A82 trunk road. It lies at the foot of Clachaig Gully, a precarious descent route to the west of the Aonach Eagach ridge, and faces across the glen to the starkly vertical western shoulder of Bidean nam Bian.

== Popular culture ==
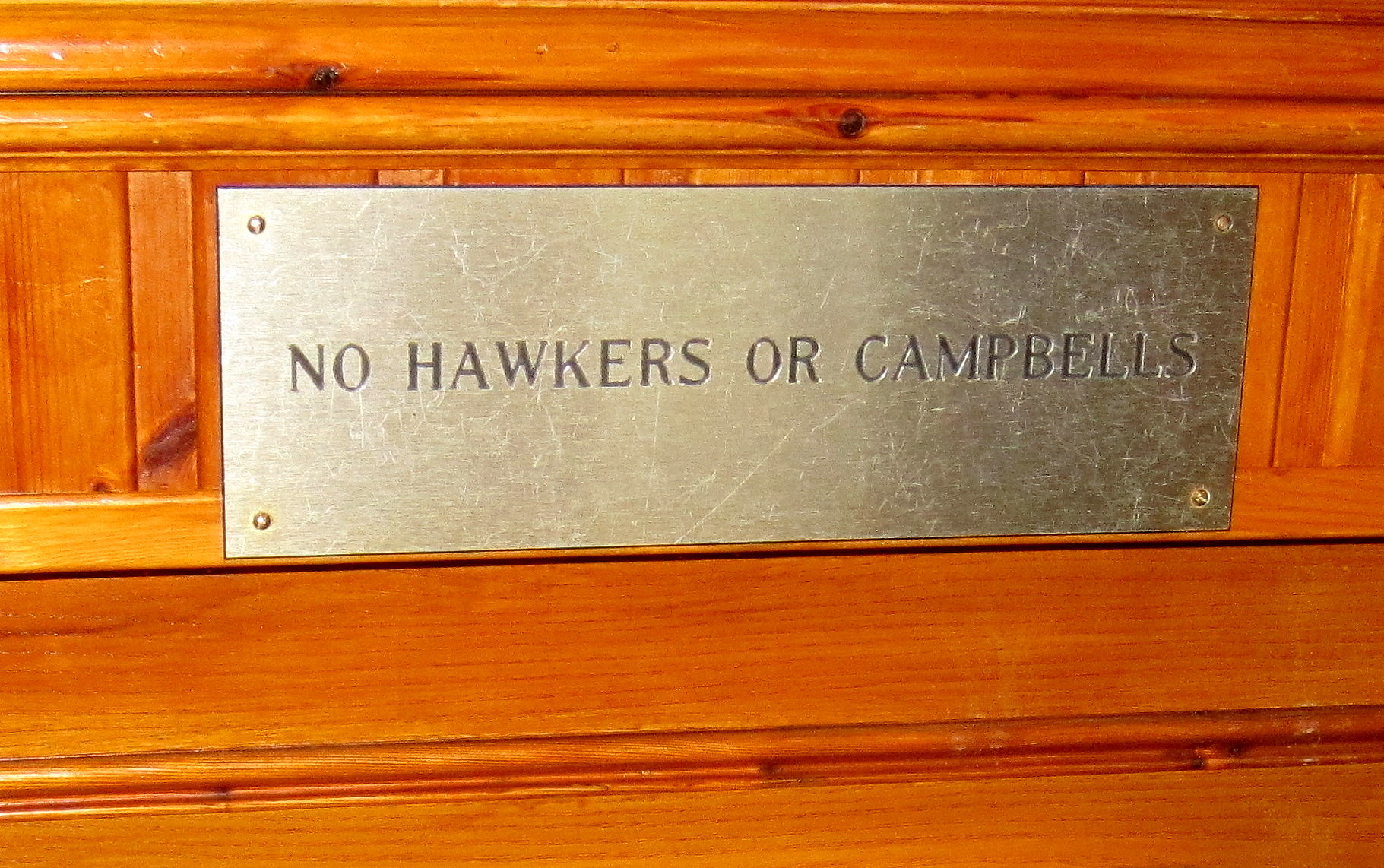
The sign

The inn, dating back to the 16th century, more recently has a sign on its door saying "No hawkers or Campbells" in a wry reference to the Massacre of Glencoe which happened in Glencoe village. The village lay near the inn at the time of the massacre, but has since been relocated further west.

Sets for Made of Honour, Highlander, Monty Python and the Search for the Holy Grail, and the third Harry Potter film, Harry Potter and the Prisoner of Azkaban, were built in the area.
