= Harry Potter and the Prisoner of Azkaban (film) =

2004 epic fantasy film by Alfonso Cuarón

- Theatrical release poster
- Directed by: Alfonso Cuarón
- Screenplay by: Steve Kloves
- Based on: Harry Potter and the Prisoner of Azkaban by J. K. Rowling
- Produced by: David Heyman; Chris Columbus; Mark Radcliffe
- Starring: Daniel Radcliffe; Rupert Grint; Emma Watson; Robbie Coltrane; Michael Gambon; Richard Griffiths; Gary Oldman; Alan Rickman; Fiona Shaw; Maggie Smith; Timothy Spall; David Thewlis; Emma Thompson; Julie Walters
- Cinematography: Michael Seresin
- Edited by: Steven Weisberg
- Music by: John Williams
- Production companies: Warner Bros. Pictures; Heyday Films; 1492 Pictures
- Distributed by: Warner Bros. Pictures
- Release dates: 23 May 2004 (Radio City Music Hall); 31 May 2004 (United Kingdom); 4 June 2004 (United States)
- Running time: 141 minutes
- Countries: United Kingdom; United States
- Language: English
- Budget: $130 million
- Box office: $810.6 million

Harry Potter and the Prisoner of Azkaban is a 2004 epic fantasy film directed by Alfonso Cuarón from a screenplay by Steve Kloves. It is based on the 1999 novel Harry Potter and the Prisoner of Azkaban by J. K. Rowling. It is the sequel to Harry Potter and the Chamber of Secrets (2002) and the third instalment in the Harry Potter film series. The film stars Daniel Radcliffe as Harry Potter, alongside Rupert Grint and Emma Watson as Harry's best friends Ron Weasley and Hermione Granger, respectively. The film follows Harry's third year at Hogwarts and his quest to uncover the truth about his past, including the connection recently escaped Azkaban prisoner Sirius Black has to Harry and his deceased parents.

With this film, the Harry Potter series switched to a longer eighteen-month production cycle. Cuarón was selected as director from a list that included Callie Khouri and Kenneth Branagh. The cast of previous films returned for Prisoner, with the additions of Gary Oldman, David Thewlis, Timothy Spall, and Emma Thompson, among others. It was the first appearance of Michael Gambon as Professor Albus Dumbledore, due to Richard Harris's death in 2002. Principal photography began in February 2003 at Leavesden Film Studios. It was the first in the series to extensively use real-life locations, with sets built in Scotland and scenes shot in London. Filming wrapped in November 2003.

The film was released on 31 May 2004 in the United Kingdom, and on 4 June 2004 in North America by Warner Bros. Pictures. It was the first Harry Potter film to use IMAX Technology and was released in IMAX theaters. Prisoner of Azkaban grossed a total of $808 million worldwide, making it the second-highest-grossing film of 2004, behind Shrek 2. The film received widespread acclaim from critics, with particular praise for the cinematography and Cuarón's direction; it has been credited with shifting the tone of the franchise. It was nominated for two Academy Awards, Best Original Music Score and Best Visual Effects, at the 77th Academy Awards in 2004. It was followed by Harry Potter and the Goblet of Fire in 2005.

== Plot ==
During another unhappy summer with the Dursleys in 1993, Harry Potter becomes enraged when Vernon's sister Marge insultingly trash talks his parents and unwittingly provokes him to inflate her and float away. Expecting to be expelled from Hogwarts for using magic outside school, Harry runs away but is picked up by the Knight Bus and taken to The Leaky Cauldron, where Minister for Magic Cornelius Fudge assures Harry that he will not face punishment. Upon reuniting with his best friends Ron Weasley and Hermione Granger, Harry learns that Sirius Black, an alleged supporter of Lord Voldemort, has escaped Azkaban prison and is expected to come after Harry.

While journeying to Hogwarts, the Hogwarts Express is boarded by Dementors, ghostly prison guards searching for Black; one of them causes Harry to faint, but the new Defense Against the Dark Arts teacher, Professor Lupin, repels it using a Patronus Charm. At Hogwarts, Headmaster Albus Dumbledore announces that Dementors will patrol the school until Black is captured. Hagrid is appointed as the Care of Magical Creatures teacher, but his first class goes awry when Draco Malfoy provokes a hippogriff named Buckbeak to attack him; as a result, Draco's father has Buckbeak sentenced to death.

Hogwarts is put on high alert when the portrait of The Fat Lady warns that Black is in the castle and attempted to break into Gryffindor Tower. The Dementors attack Harry during a Quidditch match, but he is saved by Dumbledore, although his broomstick is destroyed; Harry's sensitivity to the Dementors prompts him to ask Lupin to teach him the Patronus Charm. Harry, unable to visit Hogsmeade Village without permission from his guardians, attempts to sneak out of the castle but is caught by Fred and George Weasley, who provide him with the Marauder's Map, which shows him a secure passage to Hogsmeade. Above The Three Broomsticks pub, he overhears Professor Minerva McGonagall, pub owner Madam Rosmerta and Fudge discuss how Black is Harry's godfather, divulged the Potters' whereabouts to Voldemort, and murdered their mutual friend Peter Pettigrew; Harry vows to kill Black if they meet.

Harry, Ron, and Hermione witness the execution of Buckbeak, after which a large black dog drags Ron into a hole at the base of the Whomping Willow. Harry and Hermione follow them through an underground passage to the Shrieking Shack, where the dog is revealed to be Black, an Animagus. Lupin appears in the shack, where he is revealed to be an old friend of Black and a werewolf. Lupin and Black reveal that Ron's pet rat, Scabbers, is actually the Animagus form of Pettigrew, who is returned to human form and revealed to have betrayed Harry's parents, framed Black, and faked his own death.

The group heads back to the castle, intending to both exonerate Black, who offers to let Harry live with him instead of the Dursleys, and expose Pettigrew as the real killer, but the full moon causes Lupin to transform into a humanoid wolf; amid the chaos, Pettigrew turns back into a rat and escapes. Black transforms into his dog form and fights off werewolf Lupin, who seriously injures Black. Harry finds Black but the Dementors arrive and brutally attack them both until an unseen person casts a powerful Patronus charm to ward them off.

Harry falls unconscious and awakens in the hospital wing, while Black has been recaptured and, with Pettigrew gone, sentenced to the Dementor's Kiss. With Dumbledore's advice, Harry and Hermione use her Time-Turner to travel back in time and rescue Buckbeak from execution. Harry realizes he had saved himself and Black previously with a Patronus charm and used it to drive the Dementors away. They successfully free Black, who escapes on Buckbeak. Lupin subsequently resigns, Severus Snape having exposed his secret condition as a werewolf. Harry receives a new Firebolt broomstick from Black.

== Cast ==
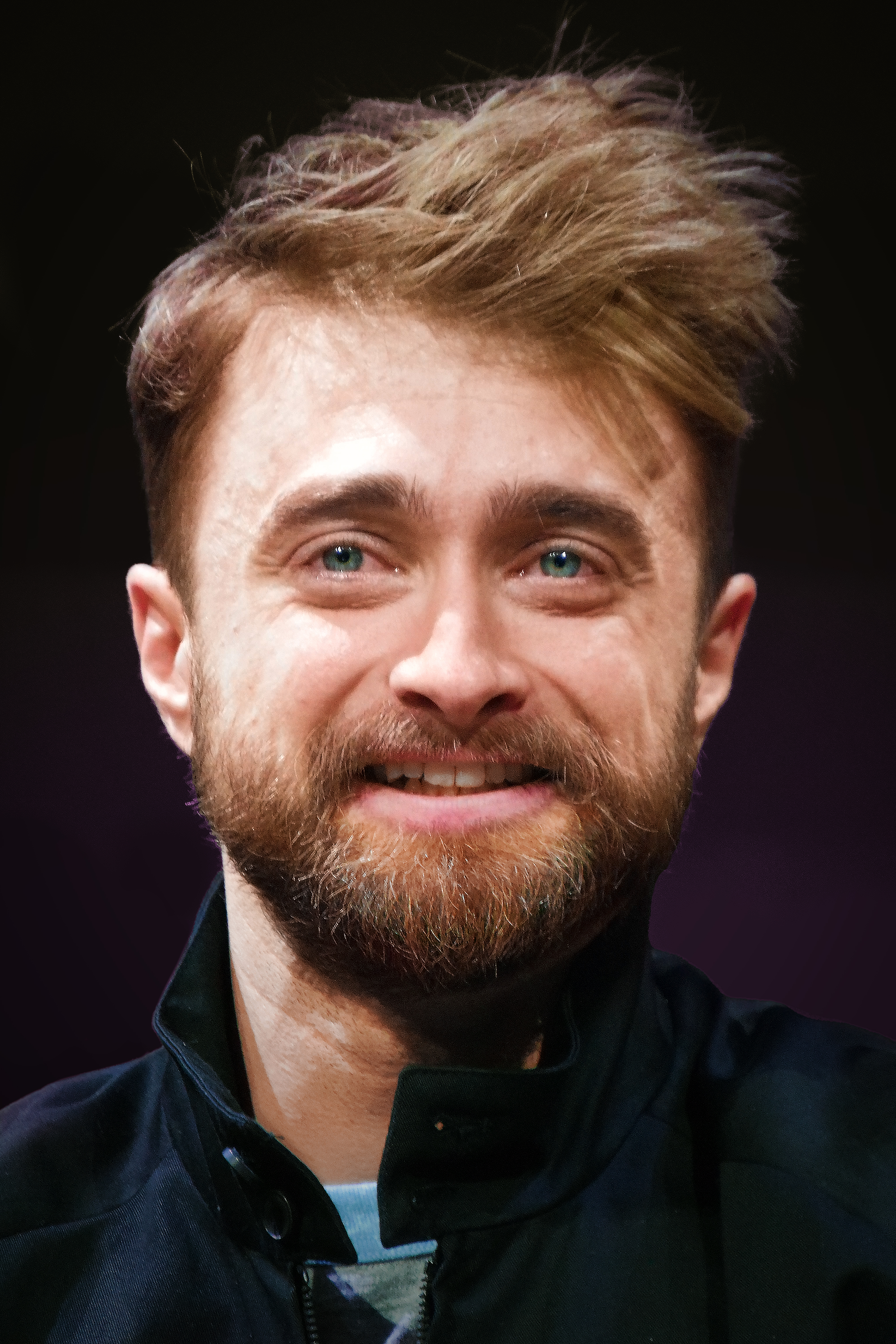
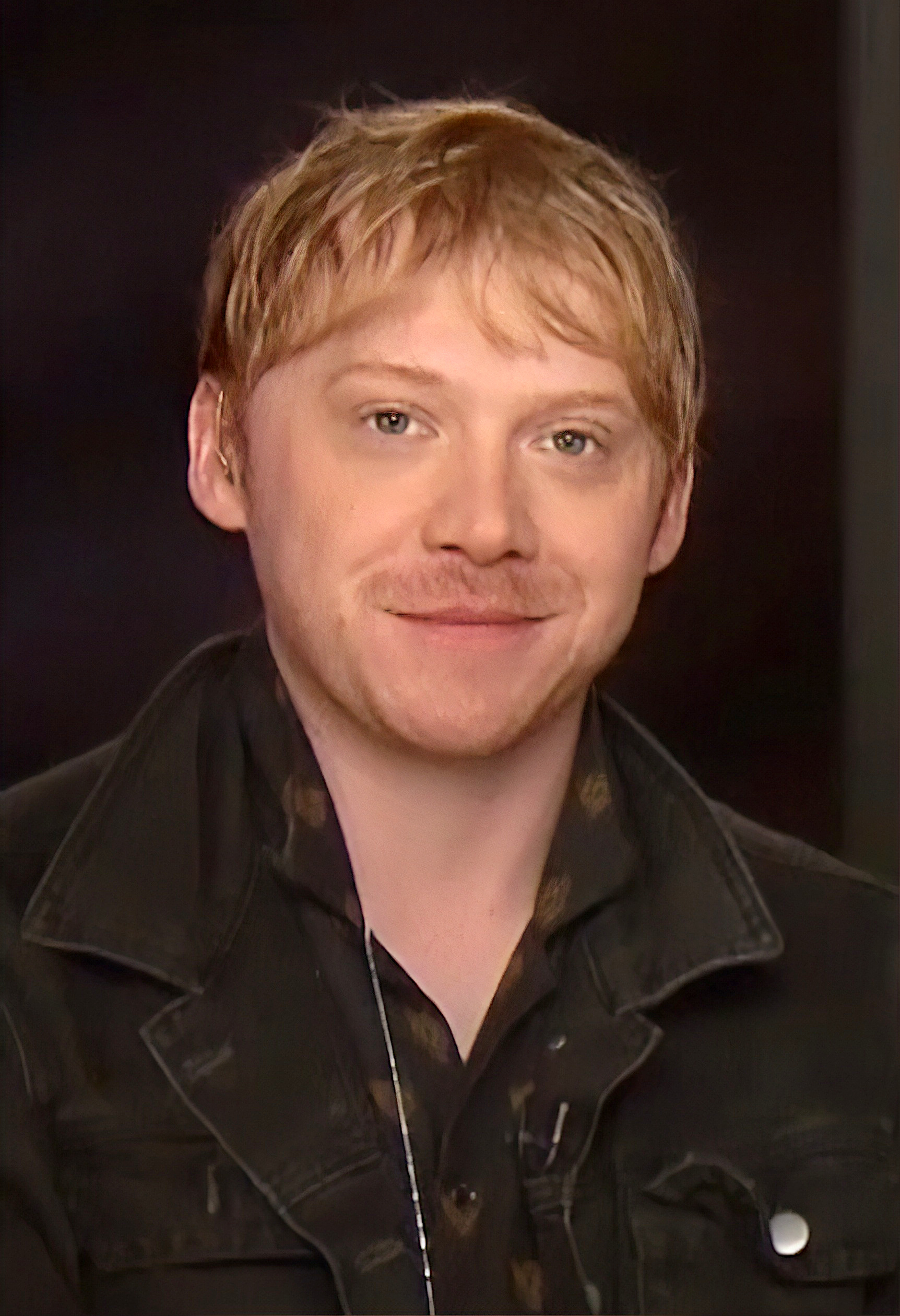
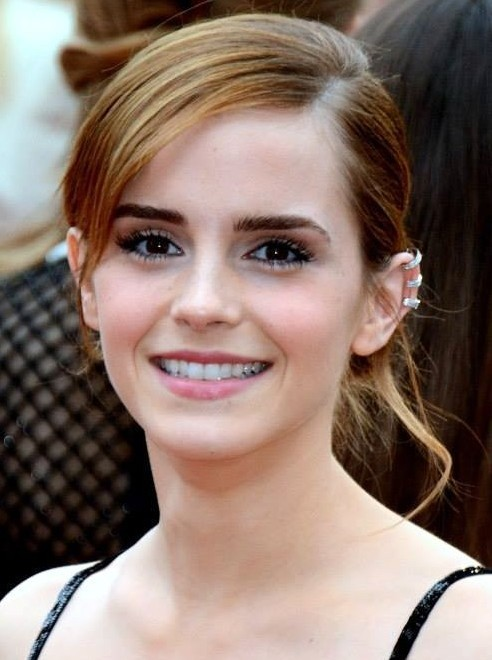
Left to right: Daniel Radcliffe (pictured in 2022), Rupert Grint (2018), and Emma Watson (2013)
- Daniel Radcliffe as Harry Potter: A 13-year-old British wizard famous for surviving his parents' murder at the hands of the evil dark wizard Lord Voldemort as an infant, who now enters his third year at Hogwarts School of Witchcraft and Wizardry.
- Rupert Grint as Ron Weasley: Harry's best friend at Hogwarts and a younger member of the Weasley wizarding family.
- Emma Watson as Hermione Granger: Harry's other best friend and the trio's brains.
- Robbie Coltrane as Rubeus Hagrid: The gamekeeper and new Care of Magical Creatures teacher at Hogwarts.
- Michael Gambon as Albus Dumbledore:
  The headmaster of Hogwarts and one of the greatest wizards of all time. Gambon assumed the role after Richard Harris, who played Dumbledore in the previous two films, died of Hodgkin's disease on 25 October 2002, three weeks before the second film's release. Despite his illness, Harris was determined to film his part, telling a visiting David Heyman not to recast the role. Four months after Harris's death, Cuarón chose Gambon as his replacement. Gambon was unconcerned with bettering or copying Harris, giving his own interpretation instead, but putting on a slight Irish accent for the role as an homage to him. He completed his scenes in three weeks. The producers originally offered the role to Ian McKellen, but McKellen turned it down as he had played a similar character Gandalf in The Lord of the Rings trilogy. He also stated it would have been inappropriate to take Harris' role, as Harris had previously called McKellen a "dreadful" actor. Christopher Lee was also considered; he later said that it would have been in very "bad taste" if he was offered the role. Harris' family had expressed an interest in seeing Harris's close friend Peter O'Toole being chosen as his replacement, but the producers felt that his age and health would become troublesome down the line. According to Columbus, O'Toole turned down the role due to his close friend relationship with Harris, feeling that it didn't feel right to step into his shoes.
- Richard Griffiths as Vernon Dursley: Harry's Muggle uncle.
- Gary Oldman as Sirius Black:
  Harry's infamous godfather, who escapes from the Wizarding prison Azkaban after serving twelve years there for being wrongly accused of being the Death Eater who betrayed Harry's parents to Voldemort. Oldman accepted the part because he needed the money, as he had not taken on any major work in several years after deciding to spend more time with his children. He was "surprised by how difficult it was to pull off", comparing the role to Shakespearean dialogue.
- Alan Rickman as Severus Snape: The Potions teacher at Hogwarts and head of Slytherin.
- Fiona Shaw as Petunia Dursley: Harry's Muggle aunt.
- Maggie Smith as Minerva McGonagall: Deputy Headmistress of Hogwarts, the Transfiguration teacher at Hogwarts and head of Gryffindor.
- Timothy Spall as Peter Pettigrew: A former friend of Harry's parents said to have been killed by Sirius Black, but was later revealed to have been the real Death Eater who betrayed Harry's parents to Voldemort.
- David Thewlis as Professor Lupin:
  The new Defence Against the Dark Arts teacher at Hogwarts and a werewolf. Robin Williams was interested in the role, but was turned down due to the "British only" cast rule. Thewlis, who had previously auditioned for the role of Quirinus Quirrell in Harry Potter and the Philosopher's Stone (2001), was Cuarón's first choice for the role of Professor Lupin. He accepted the role on advice from Ian Hart, who was cast as Quirrell, and had told him that Professor Lupin was "the best part in the book." Thewlis had seen the first two films and had only read part of the first book, although he read the third after taking the role.
- Emma Thompson as Sybill Trelawney: The Divination teacher at Hogwarts. Tilda Swinton was offered the role, but turned it down.
- Julie Walters as Molly Weasley: Ron's mother.
- Bonnie Wright as Ginny Weasley
- Ian Brown as Man in the Leaky Cauldron reading book

Several actors from the previous film reprise their roles in Prisoner of Azkaban. Harry Melling appears as Dudley Dursley, Harry's Muggle cousin. James and Oliver Phelps play Fred and George Weasley, Ron's twin brothers; Chris Rankin appears as Percy Weasley, Ron's other brother and a Hogwarts head boy; while Mark Williams plays their father, Arthur Weasley. Tom Felton portrays Draco Malfoy, Harry's rival in Slytherin, while Jamie Waylett and Josh Herdman appear as Crabbe and Goyle, Draco's minions. Matthew Lewis and Devon Murray play Neville Longbottom and Seamus Finnigan respectively, two Gryffindor students in Harry's year. David Bradley appears as Argus Filch, Hogwarts' caretaker, while Robert Hardy portrays Cornelius Fudge, the Minister for Magic.

Pam Ferris portrays Aunt Marge, Vernon's sister; Lee Ingleby plays Stan Shunpike, conductor of the Knight Bus; and Jim Tavaré appears as Tom, innkeeper of The Leaky Cauldron, replacing Derek Deadman from the first film. Dawn French plays the Fat Lady, a painting at Hogwarts, replacing Elizabeth Spriggs from the first film. Julie Christie appears as Madam Rosmerta, the barmaid at the Three Broomsticks. Warwick Davis appears as the conductor of the Hogwarts choir. The role was offered to him by producer David Heyman due to Filius Flitwick, Davis' original role, being absent from the script. The change in appearance for the new character later became Flitwick's look for the rest of the series. Lenny Henry and Paul Whitehouse have voice cameos as a shrunken head on the Knight Bus and painting subject Sir Cadogan, respectively.

== Production ==
=== Development ===
With the film adaptation of Harry Potter and the Prisoner of Azkaban, production of the Harry Potter films switched to an eighteen-month cycle, which producer David Heyman explained was "to give each [film] the time it required." Chris Columbus, the director of Harry Potter and the Philosopher's Stone (2001) and Harry Potter and the Chamber of Secrets (2002), chose to return as a producer instead alongside Heyman as Columbus felt that offered him better work-life balance, allowing him to not be present on the set all the time and spend time with his children. Guillermo del Toro was approached to direct, but had envisioned a more Dickensian version of the stories, and was put off by the first two films which he found too "bright and happy and full of light". Marc Forster turned down the film because he had made Finding Neverland (2004) and did not want to direct child actors again. M. Night Shyamalan was considered to direct but turned it down because he was working on his own film, The Village (2004). Warner Bros. then composed a three-name shortlist for Columbus's replacement, which consisted of Callie Khouri, Kenneth Branagh (who played Gilderoy Lockhart in Chamber of Secrets) and eventual selection Alfonso Cuarón in July 2002. Cuarón was initially reluctant to direct, as he had not read any of the books or seen the films. Del Toro berated him for his arrogance and told him to read the books. After reading the series, he changed his mind and signed on to direct, as he had immediately connected to the story.

Cuarón's appointment pleased J. K. Rowling, who loved his film Y tu mamá también (2001) and was impressed with his 1995 adaptation of A Little Princess (1905). Heyman found that "tonally and stylistically, [Cuarón] was the perfect fit." As his first exercise with the actors who portray the central trio, Cuarón assigned Radcliffe, Grint and Watson to write an autobiographical essay about their character, written in the first person, spanning birth to the discovery of the magical world, and including the character's emotional experience. Cuarón recalls, "Emma's essay was 10 pages long. Daniel's was exactly two. Rupert didn't deliver the essay. When I questioned why he didn't do it, he said, 'I'm Ron; Ron wouldn't do it.' So I said, 'Okay, you do understand your character.' That was the most important piece of acting work that we did on Prisoner of Azkaban, because it was very clear that everything they put in those essays was going to be the pillars they were going to hold on to for the rest of the process."

=== Costume and set design ===
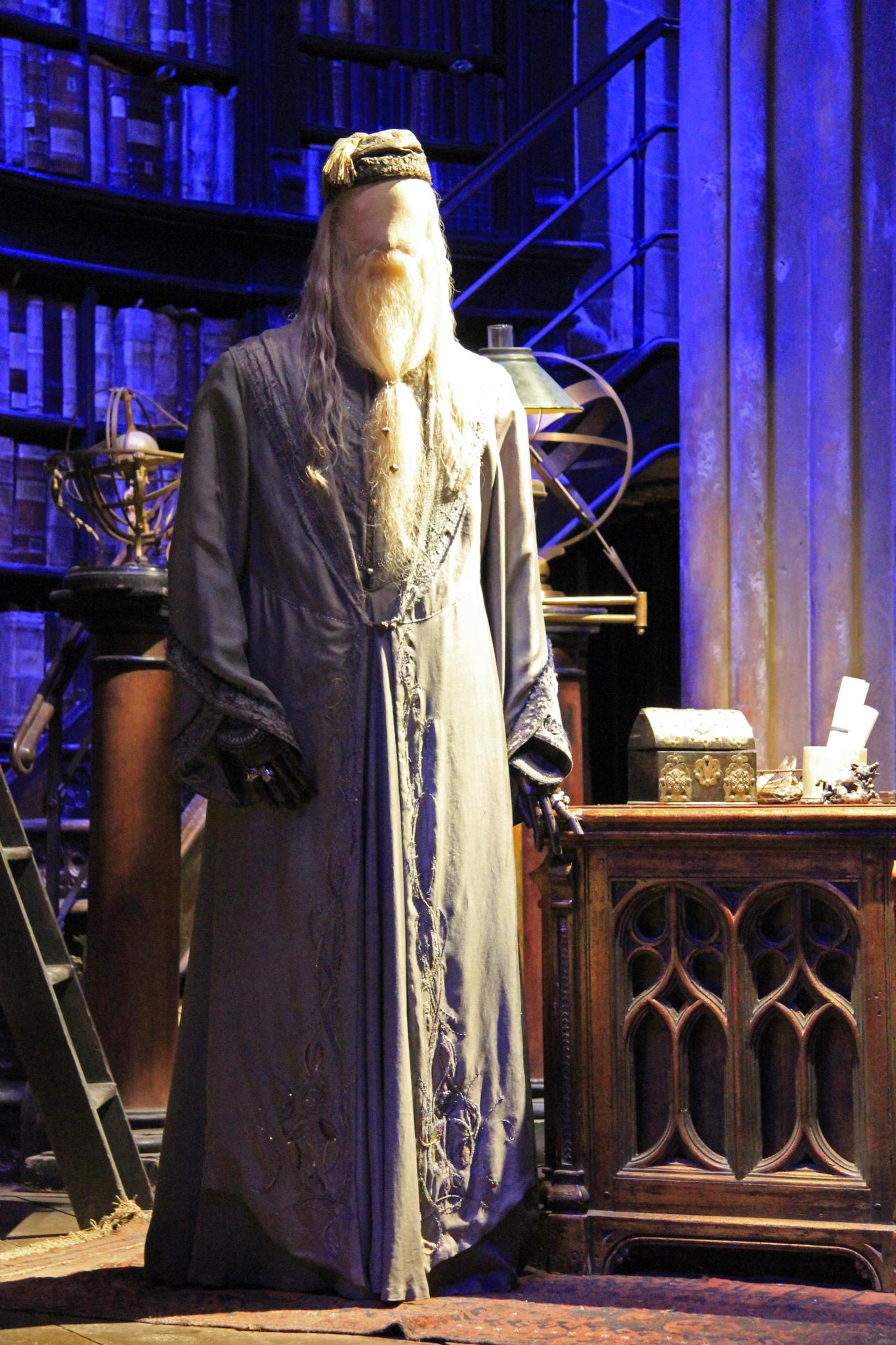
Albus Dumbledore's costume used in the film

Cuarón wanted to establish a more mature tone in the characters' costumes and the sets. He explained, "What I really wanted to do was to make Hogwarts more contemporary and a little more naturalistic." He studied English schools and noted, "Each teenager's individuality was reflected in the way they wore their uniform. So I asked all the kids in the film to wear their uniforms as they would if their parents weren't around." Columbus considered the costumes changes as "a reflection of the character development within the books themselves" and their transition to teenagers. Whereas in the first two films the characters are constantly in their uniforms, in Prisoner of Azkaban the characters often wear modern street clothes. Rowling, who was consulted for this change, stated, "for me the cloaks and everything makes sense for the academic time but in personal time they would be wearing their own clothes." Jany Temime joined the film as costume designer, eventually working on all of the following instalments in the series.

For Remus Lupin, Temime opted for "tweeds typical of England." Cuarón stated that the character should look like "an uncle who parties hard on the weekends", so Temime preserved his gown "unkempt and more shabby than the other teachers' robes." For Trelawney, Thompson made sketches of the costumes and sent them to Temime and Cuarón. Thompson saw the character as "a person who hasn't looked in the mirror for a long time". In order to highlight the character's short-sightedness, Temime used material filled with mirrors and eyes, as well as oversized glasses with magnifying lenses. Cuarón wanted Dumbledore to look like "an old hippie, but still very chic and with a lot of class". Temime used tie-dyed silk that would float behind him while walking, which she considered "a much lighter look" that gave the character more energy, in contrast with the "heavy and majestic" costumes designed for Harris' portrayal of Dumbledore.

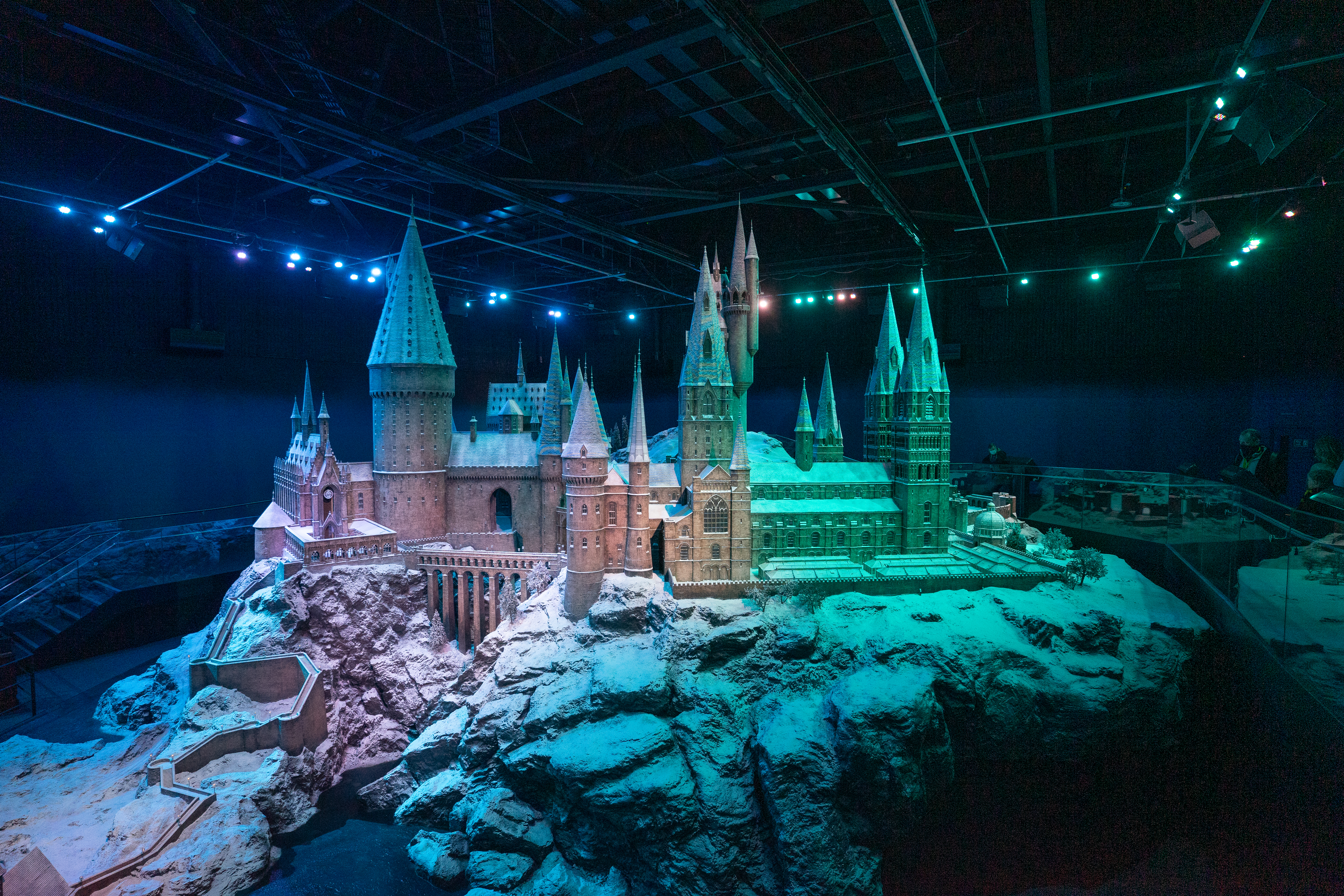
Hogwarts model at the Making of Harry Potter tour in London

Cuarón's main concern was for Hogwarts to have a larger scope and be grounded in the real world. The scale model of the Hogwarts exterior designed for the first film was expanded by around 40% for Prisoner of Azkaban. Production designer Stuart Craig and art director Gary Tomkins added constructions including a clock tower and a courtyard, and the hospital wing was redesigned and rebuilt. Other sets constructed for the film included the Hogsmeade village and The Three Broomsticks public house.

The use of real-life locations significantly changed the look of Hagrid's hut. For Prisoner of Azkaban, the landscape around the set changed from being completely flat to the side of a hill. The hut doubled in size, with a separate bedroom built on the back and the addition of a large pumpkin patch and a chimney. Craig cited the Shrieking Shack as a particularly challenging set to create. It was built on a large hydraulic platform with the help of the special effects department, "creaking and moving as if being continually buffeted by the wind" in order to appear almost alive.

Some sets were either reused from earlier films or used for more than one space. The Defence Against the Dark Arts and Divination classrooms were filmed in the same set. The Honeydukes set was a redress of the set of Flourish & Blotts that was seen in Chamber of Secrets, which, in turn, had been redressed from the Ollivanders set from the first film.

=== Filming ===
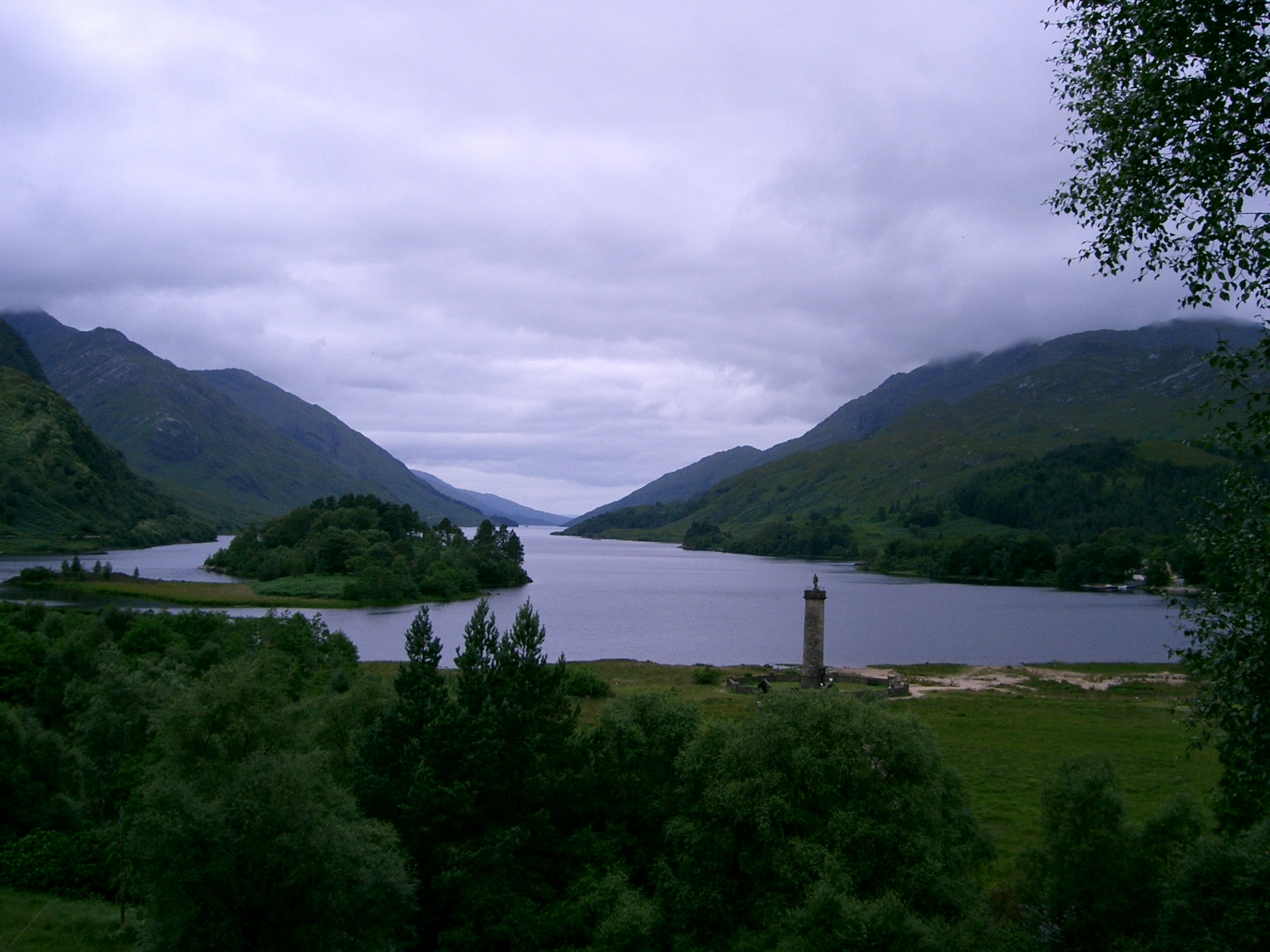
Loch Shiel, where scenes from Prisoner of Azkaban were filmed

Principal photography began on 24 February 2003, at Leavesden Film Studios, and ended on 28 November 2003.

The third film was the first to extensively use real-life locations, as much of the first two films had been shot in the studio. Three sets for the film were built in Glen Coe, Scotland, near the Clachaig Inn. Harry's ride on Buckbeak over Hogwarts' Lake was filmed at the Virginia Water Lake in Surrey. The Black Lake was also filmed from Loch Shiel, Loch Eilt and Loch Morar in the Scottish Highlands. Incidentally, the Glenfinnan Viaduct railway, which was also featured in Chamber of Secrets, is opposite Loch Shiel and was used to film the sequences when the Dementor boarded the train. A small section of the Knight Bus scene, where it weaves in between traffic, was filmed in North London's Palmers Green on 2 April 2003. Some parts were also filmed in and around Borough Market and Lambeth Bridge in London. Certain scenes were also filmed at the University of Oxford; those set in the hospital wing were filmed at the university's Divinity School.

Director of photography Michael Seresin considered the story much darker compared to its two predecessors, so he employed "moody [lighting], with more shadows". He used a variety of wide-angle lenses to amplify Hogwarts' prominence in the story, and only used close-ups sparingly. "We prefer to observe the kids from further away, as I find body language to be very interesting", Cuarón explained.

Rowling allowed Cuarón to make minor changes to the book, on the condition that he stuck to the book's spirit. She allowed him to place a sundial on Hogwarts' grounds, but rejected a graveyard, as that would play an important part in the then-unreleased sixth book. Rowling said she "got goosebumps" when she saw several moments in the film, as they inadvertently referred to events in the final two books, she stated, "people are going to look back on the film and think that those were put in deliberately as clues." When filming concluded, Cuarón found that it had "been the two sweetest years of my life," and expressed his interest in directing one of the sequels.

The Knight Bus sequence was shot over several weeks at various locations in London. In order to give the impression of the vehicle moving at 100 miles per hour (161 km/h), stunt coordinator Greg Powell explained, "We drove the bus at about 30 miles per hour [48 km/h] and the other cars were going only about 8 [13]. It took weeks of planning with stunt drivers, and even the people you see on the street are stunt men and women, who were trained to walk incredibly slow just to make the bus look faster."

=== Special and visual effects ===
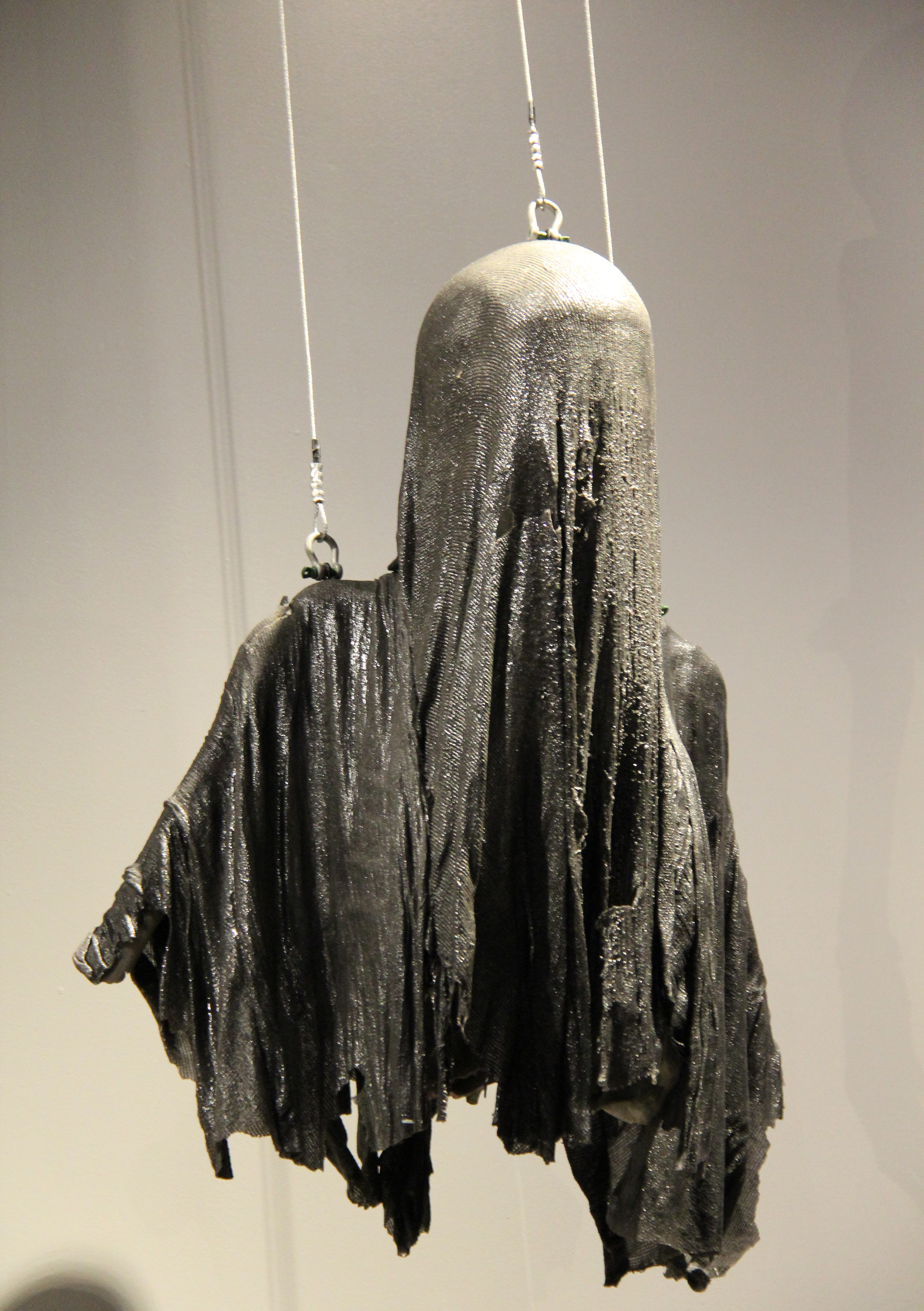
A dementor at the Making of Harry Potter tour in London

Industrial Light & Magic (ILM) and Framestore CFC handled the key visual effects shots for the film, while The Moving Picture Company (MPC), Cinesite, and Double Negative crafted additional VFX material.

Cuarón originally wanted to move away from CGI toward puppetry. He hired master puppeteer Basil Twist and experimented with underwater puppets to figure out the movements of dementors. The tests were shot in slow motion, but ultimately the method wasn't practical. The water test footage provided creative direction for the visual effects team, adding the intangible metaphysical quality Cuarón was seeking. Visual effects supervisors Tim Burke and Roger Guyett, the Industrial Light & Magic VFX team, and Temime collaborated in the creation of dementors.

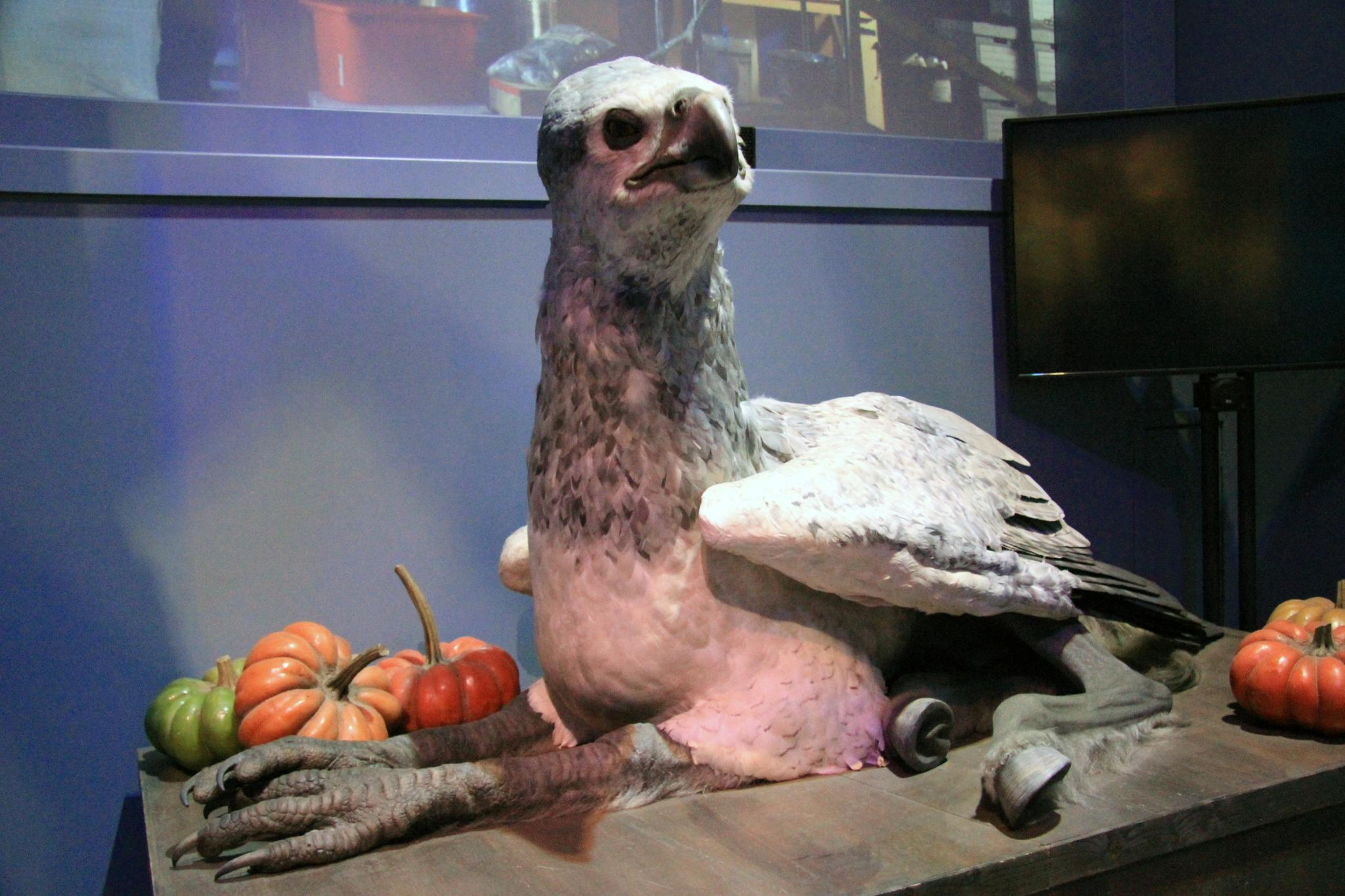
Buckbeak at the Making of Harry Potter tour

Cuarón commented on the difficulty of creating Buckbeak, which took months of research and preparation, beginning with the creature's skeletal design. Cuarón said, "Once we worked out the physiology, the way his bones would actually move, we had to capture his personality, which is a mixture of regal elegance, particularly when he is flying, and the clumsy and greedy creature he becomes back on land." Creature effects supervisor Nick Dudman created several practical hippogriffs for the production, while Burke and Guyett oversaw the creation of the computer-generated version. Guyett cited the complex movement of the feathers as an achievement that had "never been done before."

The inflation of Aunt Marge was achieved practically. Ferris said, "I wore various prosthetic bodies, which inflated at different rates, and at my largest, I was about four and a half feet wide." The 50 pounds (23 kg) costume prevented Ferris from walking and eating. Thirty-eight tweed suits of increasing size were used for the sequence.

Cinesite was in charge of the time travel shot featured in the film, which was over a minute long. The main action was filmed on a steadicam against bluescreen, and four minutes of background footage was shot separately. The background was then sped up and composited behind the main action. Two other plates of background footage were tiled together as the camera turned.

=== Music ===
When it was announced that Cuarón would direct Prisoner of Azkaban, there was initial speculation that his collaborative composer Patrick Doyle (who would score the following film) would do the music. Cuarón, however, retained John Williams, for whom it would be the third and final movie he scored in the series. The soundtrack was a significant departure from the previous two, as Cuarón wanted the score to take a different approach. One of the new themes, "Double Trouble", was written during production for a children's choir to perform in Hogwarts's Great Hall in one of the film's earlier scenes. The lyrics of the song were taken from William Shakespeare's Macbeth. The soundtrack album was released by Atlantic Records on 25 May 2004.

== Differences from the book ==
Prisoner of Azkaban was, at the time of publication, the series' longest book. The increasing plot complexity necessitated a looser adaptation of the book's finer plot lines and back-story. The connection between Harry's father and the Marauder's Map is only briefly mentioned, as is Remus Lupin's association to the map. Additionally, it was never mentioned who the Marauders were or who the nicknames Moony, Wormtail, Padfoot, and Prongs referred to. Some exposition was removed for dramatic effect: both the Shrieking Shack and Scabbers the rat are mentioned only very briefly in the film, while they receive more thorough coverage in the novel. Most of Sirius Black's back story is also cut, with no mention of how he escaped from Azkaban.

On account of pace and time considerations, the film glosses over detailed descriptions of magical education. Only one Hippogriff, Buckbeak, is seen, and only Draco Malfoy and Harry are seen interacting with the Hippogriff during Care of Magical Creatures lessons. Most other lessons, including all of Snape's Potions classes, were cut from the film. The Fidelius Charm's complicated description is removed entirely from the film, with no explanation given of exactly how Sirius is supposed to have betrayed the Potters to Lord Voldemort. Many of this scene's lines are redistributed amongst Cornelius Fudge and Minerva McGonagall; in compensation, McGonagall's exposition of the Animagus transformation is instead given by Snape.

The romantic connection between Ron and Hermione is more prominent in the film than the book; in response to criticism of the first two films for sacrificing character development for mystery and adventure, the emotional development of all three lead characters is given more attention in the third film. However, any mention of Harry's crush on Cho Chang is removed, and she first appears in the fourth film. Prisoner of Azkaban also shows a darker tone and more of Harry's emotions. For instance, after learning of Black's "betrayal" of Harry's parents, he shouts in anger "I'm gonna kill him", whereas in the book he is "too stunned to move".

In the book, Gryffindor wins the Quidditch Cup for the first time in the series, a rather significant character-development subplot that is almost completely omitted from the film. Only the first Quidditch match of the school year (where Harry's Nimbus 2000 broomstick is destroyed) is part of the film's narrative, and there are no other mentions of the sport or the Gryffindor team's successful campaign for the Cup during the rest of the film. The final scene before the credits shows Harry on his new broomstick, the Firebolt, as a known gift from Sirius after his aided escape from captivity, whereas in the book, the new broomstick is an anonymous gift midyear from Sirius (unbeknownst to Harry or anyone else at the time) that is examined by the Hogwarts staff for safety and security reasons before it eventually is given to Harry for use in pursuit of the Cup championship.

== Release ==
=== Box office ===
Harry Potter and the Prisoner of Azkaban held its New York premiere at Radio City Music Hall on 23 May 2004, followed by its London premiere at Leicester Square on 30 May 2004. The film then opened in the United Kingdom on 31 May 2004, and on 4 June 2004 in the United States. It was the first film in the series to be released in both conventional and IMAX theatres. Upon release, the film broke the record for a biggest single day in the United Kingdom's box office history making £5.3 million on a Monday. It went on to break records both with and without previews, making £23.9 million including previews and £9.3 million excluding them. The Prisoner of Azkaban had the highest-opening weekend at the UK's box office, until Spectre beat the record in 2015. It went on to make a total of £45.6 million in the UK. The film made $93.7 million during its opening weekend in the United States and Canada playing on 8,900 screens at 3,855 theaters, achieving, at the time, the third-biggest-opening weekend of all time. This opening also broke Hulk's record ($62.1 million) for the highest-opening weekend for a film released in June. The Prisoner of Azkaban held this record for five years until Transformers: Revenge of the Fallen topped it in 2009 with $109 million. Additionally, it surpassed The Matrix Reloaded for having the largest opening weekend for a Warner Bros. Pictures film. The film was also No. 1 at the North American box office for two consecutive weekends.

The Prisoner of Azkaban made a total of $810.6 million worldwide, which made it 2004's second-highest-grossing film worldwide behind Shrek 2. In the U.S. and Canada, it was only the year's sixth-highest-grossing film, making $250.7 million. However, it was the year's number one film internationally, making $558.3 million compared to Shrek 2's $487.5 million. Despite its successful box office run, The Prisoner of Azkaban is the lowest-grossing Harry Potter film, and the third lowest-grossing film of the Wizarding World series.

=== Merchandise ===
As with the previous films in the series, Prisoner of Azkaban was a large merchandising opportunity. The video game version, designed by EA UK, was released on 25 May 2004. Mattel released film tie-ins that included the Harry Potter Championship Quidditch board game and character action figures. Lego also expanded on its previous merchandising for the first two films with the release of sets that included the Knight Bus, Shrieking Shack and a new Hogwarts castle.

=== Home media ===
Harry Potter and the Prisoner of Azkaban was released on DVD and on VHS on 23 November 2004. The 2-disc Special Editions later came out on DVD and Blu-ray on 4 October 2016. The film was also released on Ultra HD Blu-ray on 7 November 2017.

== Reception ==
=== Critical response ===
On Rotten Tomatoes the film has an approval rating of 91% based on 264 reviews. The site's critical consensus reads, "Under the assured direction of Alfonso Cuarón, Harry Potter and the Prisoner of Azkaban triumphantly strikes a delicate balance between technical wizardry and complex storytelling." On Metacritic, the film has a weighted average score of 82 out of 100, based on 40 critics, indicating "universal acclaim". Audiences polled by CinemaScore gave the film an average grade of "A" on an A+ to F scale.

Mick LaSalle of the San Francisco Chronicle lauded the film's more mature tone and said it was "darker, more complex, rooted in character." The Hollywood Reporter called the film "a deeper, darker, visually arresting and more emotionally satisfying adaptation of the J.K. Rowling literary phenomenon," especially compared to the first two films. Peter Travers of Rolling Stone gave the film three-and-a-half out of four stars: "Not only is this dazzler by far the best and most thrilling of the three Harry Potter movies to date, it's a film that can stand on its own even if you never heard of author J.K. Rowling and her young wizard hero." Stephanie Zacharek of Salon considered it "one of the greatest fantasy films of all time." Nicole Arthur of The Washington Post praised the film as "complex, frightening, [and] nuanced." Film critic Roger Ebert gave the film three-and-a-half out of four stars, saying that the film was not quite as good as the first two, but still called it "delightful, amusing and sophisticated". Claudia Puig from USA Today found the film to be "a visual delight," and added that "Cuarón is not afraid to make a darker film and tackle painful emotions"; while Richard Roeper called the film "a creative triumph." Sean Smith from Newsweek said: "The Prisoner of Azkaban boasts a brand-new director and a bold new vision," and called the film "moving," praising the performances by the three main leads. Entertainment Weekly praised the film for being more mature than its predecessors.

The Guardian gave the film 3 stars out of 5, saying, "This new Harry Potter picture will cast a spell on its fanbase. But the broomstick's losing altitude." Screen Daily commented, "Cuaron delivers a genuinely spooky and emotionally involving adventure which gives the world of Potter much-needed character and atmosphere". The BBC commended the sets and direction, but did not find it "emotionally engrossing". Hollywood.com gave a positive review, praising the plot and storyline, despite a deviation from the first two films.

=== Accolades ===
Harry Potter and the Prisoner of Azkaban received two Academy Award nominations: Best Visual Effects and Best Original Score for John Williams. The film was also nominated for four BAFTA Awards: Best British Film, Best Production Design, Best Makeup & Hair, and Best Visual Effects, and won public-voted Orange Film of the Year award. It received nine Saturn Awards nominations. It won two Visual Effects Society Awards and was nominated for three others. The Broadcast Film Critics Association nominated it for Best Family Film, Best Young Actor (for Daniel Radcliffe), and Best Young Actress (for Emma Watson).

The film ranks at No. 471 in Empire magazine's 2008 list of the 500 greatest movies of all time. IGN designated Prisoner of Azkaban as the fifth best fantasy film. Additionally, Moviefone designated the film as the tenth best of the decade. In 2011, the film was voted Film of the Decade at the First Light Awards by children aged 5–15. The American Film Institute nominated it for the 2007 revision of AFI's 100 Years...100 Movies, and for AFI's 10 Top 10 in the fantasy genre.

Award	Date of ceremony	Category	Recipients	Result	Ref.
Academy Awards	27 February 2005	Best Original Score	John Williams	Nominated	
Academy Awards	27 February 2005	Best Visual Effects	Tim Burke, Roger Guyett, Bill George, John Richardson	Nominated	
Amanda Awards	27 August 2004	Best Foreign Feature Film	Harry Potter and the Prisoner of Azkaban	Nominated	
Bogey Awards	2004	Bogey Award in Platinum	Harry Potter and the Prisoner of Azkaban	Won	
British Academy Film Awards	12 February 2005	Best British Film	Harry Potter and the Prisoner of Azkaban	Nominated	
British Academy Film Awards	12 February 2005	Best Production Design	Stuart Craig	Nominated	
British Academy Film Awards	12 February 2005	Best Makeup & Hair	Amanda Knight, Eithne Fennel, Nick Dudman	Nominated	
British Academy Film Awards	12 February 2005	Best Visual Effects	Tim Burke, Roger Guyett, Bill George, John Richardson	Nominated	
British Academy Film Awards	12 February 2005	Orange Film of the Year in 2005	Harry Potter and the Prisoner of Azkaban	Won	
British Academy Children's Awards	28 November 2004	British Academy Children's Award for Feature Film	Harry Potter and the Prisoner of Azkaban	Won	
Broadcast Film Critics Association	10 January 2005	Best Family Film	Harry Potter and the Prisoner of Azkaban	Nominated	
Broadcast Film Critics Association	10 January 2005	Best Young Actor	Daniel Radcliffe	Nominated	
Broadcast Film Critics Association	10 January 2005	Best Young Actress	Emma Watson	Nominated	
Broadcast Music Incorporated Film & TV Awards	18 May 2005	BMI Film Music Award	John Williams	Won	
Golden Reel Awards	26 February 2005	Best Sound Editing – Foreign Film	David Evans, Richard Beggs, Derek Trigg, Andy Kennedy, Jon Olive, Bjorn Ole Schroeder, Sam Southwick, Stefan Henrix, Tony Currie, Nick Lowe, Stuart Morton	Nominated	
Golden Trailer Awards	25 May 2004	Best Animation/Family	Teaser #2	Won	
Golden Trailer Awards	25 May 2004	Summer 2004 Blockbuster	Harry Potter and the Prisoner of Azkaban	Nominated	
Golden Trailer Awards	26 May 2005	Best Music	"Dark"	Nominated	
GoldSpirit Awards	2005	Best Original Song	"Double Trouble"	silver	
GoldSpirit Awards	2005	Best Terrifying Theme	"Apparition on the Train"	gold	
GoldSpirit Awards	2005	Best Dramatic Theme	"A Window to the Past"	silver	
GoldSpirit Awards	2005	Best Action Theme	"Buckbeak's Flight"	gold	
GoldSpirit Awards	2005	Best Comedic Theme	"Aunt Marge's Waltz"	silver	
GoldSpirit Awards	2005	Best Epic Theme	"Buckbeak's Flight"	gold	
GoldSpirit Awards	2005	Best Theme	"Buckbeak's Flight"	silver	
GoldSpirit Awards	2005	Best Sci-Fi/Fantasy Soundtrack	John Williams	gold	
GoldSpirit Awards	2005	Best Soundtrack	John Williams	bronze	
Grammy Awards	13 February 2005	Best Score Soundtrack Album for a Motion Picture, Television or Other Visual Media	John Williams	Nominated	
Hollywood Film Awards	18 October 2004	Production Designer of the Year	Stuart Craig	Won	
Hugo Awards	4–8 August 2005	Best Dramatic Presentation	Harry Potter and the Prisoner of Azkaban	Nominated	
Kids' Choice Awards	2 April 2005	Favorite Movie	Harry Potter and the Prisoner of Azkaban	Nominated	
People's Choice Awards	9 January 2005	Favorite Sequel	Harry Potter and the Prisoner of Azkaban	Nominated	
People's Choice Awards	9 January 2005	Favorite Film Villain	Gary Oldman	Nominated	
Saturn Awards	3 May 2005	Best Fantasy Film	Harry Potter and the Prisoner of Azkaban	Nominated	
Saturn Awards	3 May 2005	Best Director	Alfonso Cuarón	Nominated	
Saturn Awards	3 May 2005	Best Supporting Actor	Gary Oldman	Nominated	
Saturn Awards	3 May 2005	Best Performance by a Younger Actor	Daniel Radcliffe	Nominated	
Saturn Awards	3 May 2005	Best Writing	Steve Kloves	Nominated	
Saturn Awards	3 May 2005	Best Music	John Williams	Nominated	
Saturn Awards	3 May 2005	Best Costumes Design	Jany Temime	Nominated	
Saturn Awards	3 May 2005	Best Make-Up	Nick Dudman, Amanda Knight	Nominated	
Saturn Awards	3 May 2005	Best Special Effects	Tim Burke, Roger Guyett, Bill George, John Richardson	Nominated	
Teen Choice Awards	8 August 2004	Choice Movie: Action	Harry Potter and the Prisoner of Azkaban	Won	
Teen Choice Awards	8 August 2004	Choice Summer Movie	Harry Potter and the Prisoner of Azkaban	Nominated	
Visual Effects Society	16 February 2005	Outstanding Visual Effects in an Effects Driven Motion Picture	Roger Guyett, Tim Burke, Theresa Corrao, Emma Norton	Won	
Visual Effects Society	16 February 2005	Best Single Visual Effect of the Year	Bill George, David Andrews, Sandra Scott, Dorne Huebler	Nominated	
Visual Effects Society	16 February 2005	Outstanding Performance by an Animated Character in a Live Action Motion Picture	Buckbeak – Michael Eames, David Lomax, Felix Balbas, Pablo Grillo	Won	
Visual Effects Society	16 February 2005	Outstanding Models and Miniatures in a Motion Picture	Jose Granell, Nigel Stone	Nominated	
Visual Effects Society	16 February 2005	Outstanding Compositing in a Motion Picture	Dorne Huebler, Jay Cooper, Patrick Brennan, Anthony Shafer	Nominated	
World Soundtrack Awards	9 October 2004	Public Choice Award	John Williams	Won	
World Soundtrack Awards	9 October 2004	Soundtrack Composer of the Year	John Williams	Nominated	
World Soundtrack Awards	9 October 2004	Best Original Score of the Year	John Williams	Nominated	

== See also ==
Media related to Harry Potter and the Prisoner of Azkaban (film) at Wikimedia Commons

- List of films about witchcraft
- List of films featuring time loops
