= Aonach Eagach =

Mountain ridge in the Scottish Highlands

Coordinates: 56.679°N 5.037°W

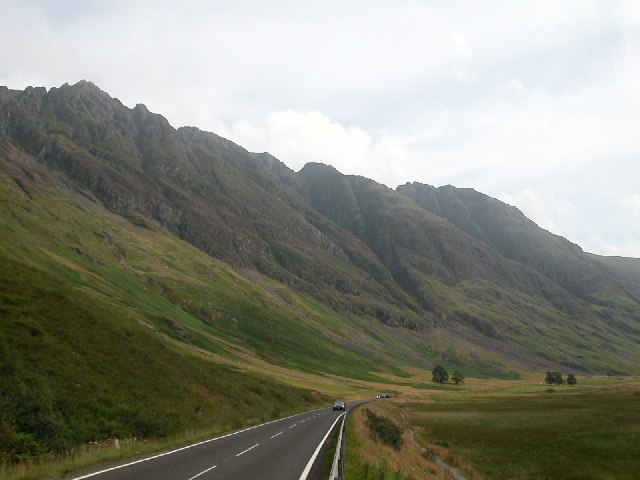
- The Aonach Eagach above the A82 road, looking up Glen Coe

Highest point
- Elevation: 967.7 m (3,175 ft)
- Prominence: 623 m (2,044 ft)
- Parent peak: Ben Alder
- Listing: Munro, Marilyn

Naming
- English translation: notched ridge
- Language of name: Gaelic
- Pronunciation: [ˈɯːnəx ˈekəx ˈs̪kɔɾ nəm ˈfian̪ˠɪ]

Geography
- Location: Glen Coe, Scotland
- Parent range: Grampian Mountains
- OS grid: NN141583
- Topo map: OS Landranger 41

The Aonach Eagach (Scottish Gaelic for 'notched ridge') is a large mountain ridge in the Scottish Highlands, marking the northern edge of Glen Coe. It stretches east–west for several miles and includes two Munro summits: Sgùrr nam Fiannaidh at 967 m (3,175 ft) high, and Meall Dearg at 952 m (3,124 ft) high. The ridge is very rocky and the route along it requires scrambling ability. The slopes to each side are extremely dangerous, with steep grass-and-scree slopes hiding even steeper slopes which end in cliffs on both north and south sides of the ridge.

== Climbing ==
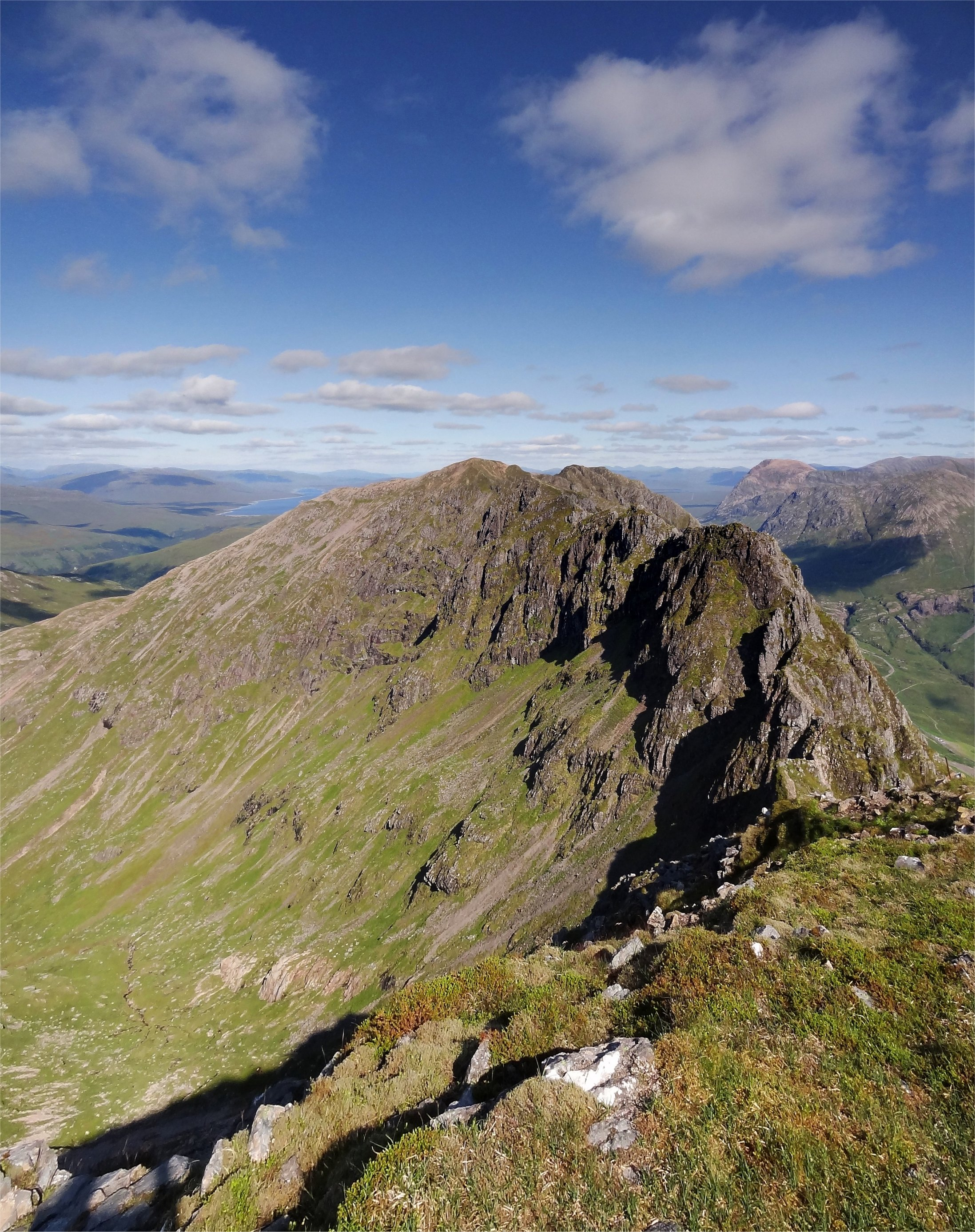
Meall Dearg

Listed summits of Aonach Eagach
Name	Grid ref	Height	Status
Sgorr nam Fiannaidh	NN14065830	967.7 m (3,175 ft)	Munro
Meall Dearg	NN16135835	952.2 m (3,124 ft)	Munro

The Aonach Eagach is usually regarded as the most difficult horizontal 'scrambling' ridge in mainland Scotland, though it vies with Liathach (and, in winter, An Teallach) for this title. In his book "Scrambles in Lochaber", local climber Noel Williams warns that there are no other ridges in the area that are "so narrow and so difficult to escape from once committed. Some sections are extremely exposed. This makes it a difficult outing to grade, because the technical difficulties are not great". Williams settled on grade 2, implying it is easier than the (optional) grade 2/3 approach scramble up A'Chailleach, but added a further warning (in bold type) that "there are no safe descents on the south side of the ridge".

The Aonach Eagach is normally tackled from the Glen Coe (south) side in an east–west traverse. The best parking for this scrambling route is located just off the A82 at grid reference NN 17335674. From Allt-na-reigh near the head of Glen Coe a good path ascends Am Bodach (a subsidiary Munro top) and continues westwards along the ridge to the first Munro proper, Meall Dearg.

From here the summit of Sgorr nam Fiannaidh lies only two kilometres to the west, but a number of pinnacles must be scrambled over, and it is not uncommon for parties to take more than two hours to cross this short distance. There are a couple of sections where the use of a rope may prove prudent.

In winter, the ridge is a fine expedition, though considerably harder than in summer (Scottish Winter Grade I/II), and many parties will go roped for some sections. Because of the short winter days, benightment on the ridge or its approaches is also not infrequent.

It is said that scramblers would also be able to reverse the ridge and descend Am Bodach, saving a walk back up the glen.

From Sgorr nam Fiannaidh, the most direct descent is to head south by southwest, down a steep zig-zag path leading by the side of Clachaig gully. This 'path' is exceptionally steep and extremely loose in places, and has many small rock steps; it approaches close to the main gully in several places and so is potentially dangerous (fatal accidents have occurred here). A gentler alternative is to continue along the ridge, until reaching the bealach between Sgorr nam Fiannaidh and the Pap of Glencoe. From here a track heads down the hillside, ending on the road just outside Glencoe village. It is also possible to retreat approximately 200 m east from the summit of Sgorr nam Fiannaidh and descend directly down the scree slope to Loch Achtriochtan, taking care to avoid being drawn into gullies further down. This descent also requires care, particularly near the top, but is still far safer than the Clachaig Gully descent.

Alternatively, the two Munros may be climbed individually by simply descending by the route of ascent. However it is for the traverse that the Aonach Eagach is best known.

=== Incidents ===
Hill walkers are urged to use caution when attempting Aonach Eagach, and fatalities on the route are not unknown.

- In summer 2009, two experienced hill walkers were fatally injured in separate incidents after falling into the Clachaig Gully along the ridge.
- In September 2014, experienced hill walker Lisa MacDermid fell nearly 492 feet while hiking the ridge when she was fatally injured.
- In July 2016, a hill walker from Aberdeen fell while walking the Aonach Eagach ridge.
- In August 2017, experienced fell runner Stuart Thompson fell 20 to 30m to his death in the Clachaig Gully on the western end on Aonach Eagach.
- In 2022, a body found in the Clachaig Gully was confirmed to be 57-year-old Alan Taylor who went missing from the Dundee area in September 2021.
- In August 2023, two climbers and their mountain guide were killed while attempting to traverse Aonach Eagach.

== Devil's Staircase ==
A path known as the Devil's Staircase crosses the range about 6 km east of Meall Dearg. Today, as part of the West Highland Way, it is used primarily by walkers and mountain bikers travelling between Kinlochleven and Glencoe.

The Devil's Staircase was given its name by the soldiers who were part of the road building programme of General Wade, because of the difficulties of carrying building materials up that stretch of the road. Later, however, the road lived up to its name when workers building the Blackwater Dam chose to travel to the Kings House Hotel after they had been paid, rather than walking down to Kinlochleven. The journey to the pub often proved to be more difficult than they realised and on the return trip, after a few drinks on a cold winter's night, the devil often "claimed his own".

In 1692, the path was the approach route for the (apparently delayed) troops coming from Kinlochleven to provide reinforcements for the Massacre of Glencoe.
