= Massacre of Glencoe Monument =

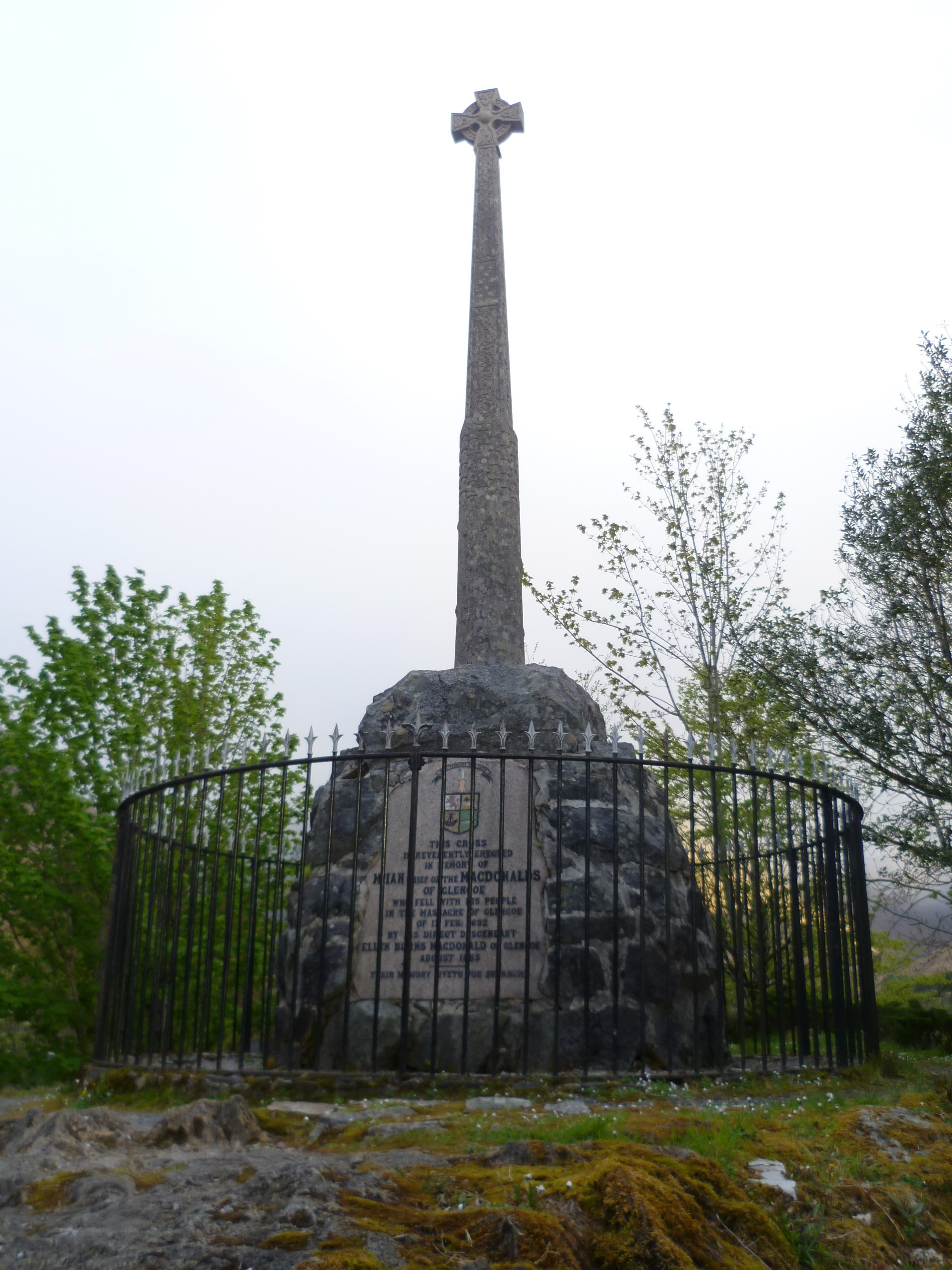
- Artist: Alexander Macdonald and Co.
- Year: 1883
- Medium: Granite
- Location: Glen Coe, Scotland
- 56°40′56″N 5°5′43″W

The Massacre of Glencoe Monument is a memorial to the Massacre of Glencoe (Scottish Gaelic: Mort Ghlinne Comhann), which took place in Glen Coe in the Highlands of Scotland on 13 February 1692, following the Jacobite uprising of 1689–92.

Sculpted by Alexander Macdonald and Co. of Aberdeen in 1883, a tapering 18-foot granite Celtic cross soars up from a rugged cairn above the river in Upper Carnoch. Its design is based on the elaborate Gosforth Cross. An annual wreath-laying ceremony is held at the Monument to commemorate those who fell in the massacre.
