= Buachaille Etive Mòr =

Mountain in the Scottish Highlands

- Buachaille Èite Mòr
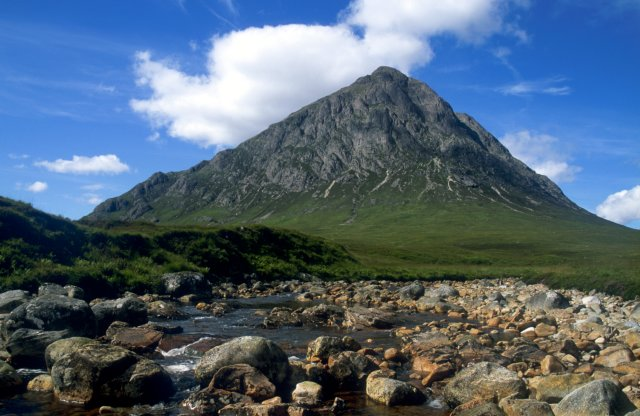
- Stob Dearg from Glen Etive

Highest point
- Elevation: 1,021.4 m (3,351 ft)
- Prominence: 532 m (1,745 ft)
- Parent peak: Bidean nam Bian
- Listing: Munro, Marilyn
- Coordinates: 56°38′50.29″N 4°53′52.07″W

Naming
- English translation: great herdsman of Etive
- Language of name: Gaelic
- Pronunciation: Scottish Gaelic: [ˈpuəxəʎə ˈeʰtʲə moːɾ], English: /ˈbuːəxeɪl ˈɛtɪv ˈmɔːr/

Geography
- Location within Scotland
- Location: Glen Etive, Scotland
- OS grid: NN223543
- Topo map: OS Landranger 41

Listed summits of Buachaille Etive Mòr
Name	Grid ref	Height	Status
Stob Dearg	NN223543	1,022 m (3,352 ft)	Munro, Marilyn
Stob na Doire	NN207532	1,011 m (3,317 ft)	Munro top
Stob na Bròige	NN190525	956 m (3,136 ft)	Munro
Stob Coire Altruim	NN197530	941 m (3,087 ft)	Munro top

Buachaille Etive Mòr (/ˈbuəxeɪl ˈɛtɪv ˈmɔːr/; Scottish Gaelic: Buachaille Èite Mòr, "great herdsman of Etive"), also known simply as "The Buachaille", is a mountain at the head of Glen Etive in the Highlands of Scotland. Its pyramidal shape, as seen from the northeast, makes it one of the most recognisable mountains in Scotland, and one of the most depicted on postcards and calendars.

Buachaille Etive Mòr is a large ridge nearly five miles (8 km) long, almost entirely encircled by the River Etive and its tributary the River Coupall. The ridge contains four main peaks: from north-east to south-west these are Stob Dearg (1,021.4 m), Stob na Doire (1,011 m), Stob Coire Altruim (941 m) and Stob na Bròige (956 m). Stob Dearg and Stob na Bròige are both Munros; the latter was promoted to Munro status by the Scottish Mountaineering Club in 1997. To the west is the smaller ridge, Buachaille Etive Beag.

== Climbing ==
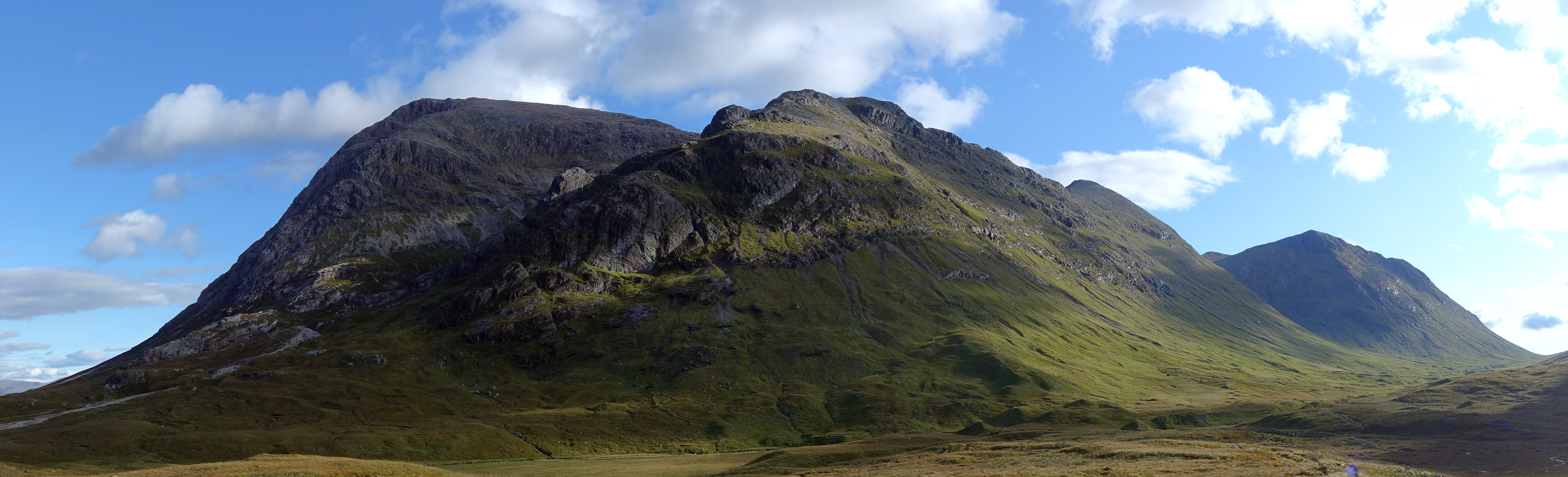
Buachaille as seen from the north with all its main peaks visible. (See the image annotations on its Wikimedia Commons page.)

The steep, craggy north-eastern face of Stob Dearg forms the classic aspect of the mountain as seen from the Kings House Hotel, and constitutes the most direct route of ascent for climbers and scramblers. Crowberry Ridge, a classic rock climb graded severe, was first climbed direct – and photographed – in 1900 by the Abraham brothers with Messrs Puttrell and Baker. Immediately to the left is Curved Ridge, one of the most famous scrambling routes.

Alternatively there is a somewhat eroded path leading steeply up the Coire na Tulaich which, in summer conditions, allows walkers to ascend the peaks, reaching the ridge about half a kilometre west of Stob Dearg.

Buachaille Etive Mòr is separated from its sister mountain of Buachaille Etive Beag to the west by the valley of Lairig Gartain. To the east lies Glen Etive, which provides an alternative route of ascent, heading up steep grassy slopes to the summit of Stob na Bròige. Another route follows the Allt Coire Altruim from the Lairig Gartain, reaching the ridge about two-thirds of the way along from the north. This route is often used as a descent route in conjunction with an ascent via Coire na Tulaich, forming a circular route with a walk out along the Lairig Gartain.

=== Injuries and deaths ===
Hillwalkers visiting Buachaille Etive Mòr have experienced injuries and even death due to the region's terrain and weather conditions. The mountain has seen up to 13 people die in one 12-month period.

In 1994, one person died in an avalanche on Buachaille Etive Mòr.

In February 1995, three people died when they were descending the mountain, and an avalanche occurred. In 1995, there were six people who died on Buachaille Etive Mòr.

In 2008, a person died in the same area of Buachaille Etive Mòr where an avalanche occurred in 2009.

In January 2009, three people died and one was injured in an avalanche on Buachaille Etive Mòr. The avalanche occurred in the Coire na Tulaich area of the mountain. The following year, an avalanche on the mountain killed two climbers.

In 2019, Terance Rooney died of hypothermia and exposure while hillwalking on Buachaille Etive Mòr.

In April 2023, Royal Marine Reggie Melia fell 50 metres to his death while hiking on Buachaille Etive Mòr.

== Lagangarbh Hut ==
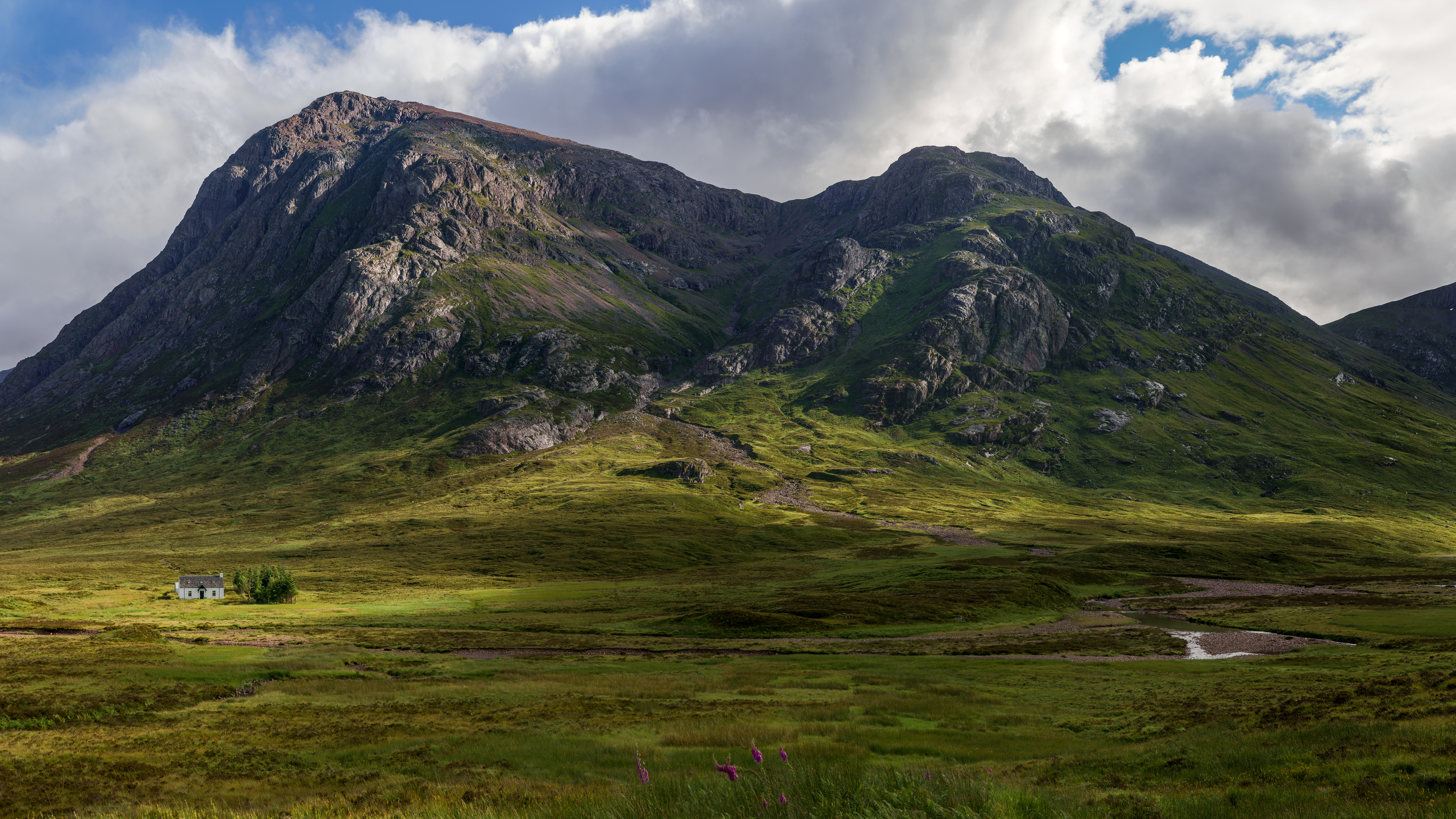
Buachaille Etive Mòr from the A82, showing Lagangarbh Hut in the lower left

The only building in the vicinity of Buachaille Etive Mòr is Lagangarbh Hut, popularly referred to as a cottage on account of its appearance. It sits at the foot of Buachaille Etive Mòr, adjacent to the River Coupall, and near the A82. It is owned by the National Trust for Scotland, and managed by the Scottish Mountaineering Club, who make it available to hire as accommodation; up to 30 people can be accommodated.

== In popular culture ==
Together with Beinn a'Chrulaiste, Buachaille Etive Mòr can be seen in the film Skyfall, where James Bond transports M away from the villain Raoul Silva. It was also the setting for the 1983 pop video "Whistle Down the Wind" by Nick Heyward, The Cure's music video for 1990 single "Pictures of You", as well as "politics and violence" by popular Florida-based singer Dominic Fike. Buachaille Etive Mòr appears in the background during a song sequence in the 1998 Bollywood film Kuch Kuch Hota Hai.

== Photography ==
The Buachaille has become synonymous with landscape photography in Scotland and is probably the most photographed mountain in the country. The most popular spot for this is the small waterfalls on the River Coupall to the east of the mountain. In recent years, the condition of the ground around these falls has deteriorated rapidly, and many photographers now actively encourage staying away from the area to allow for regeneration. The site has also become popular for wedding photography with the mountain providing a dramatic backdrop.

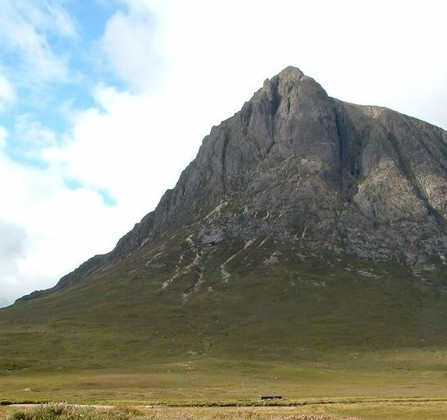
The Buachaille's north-east face

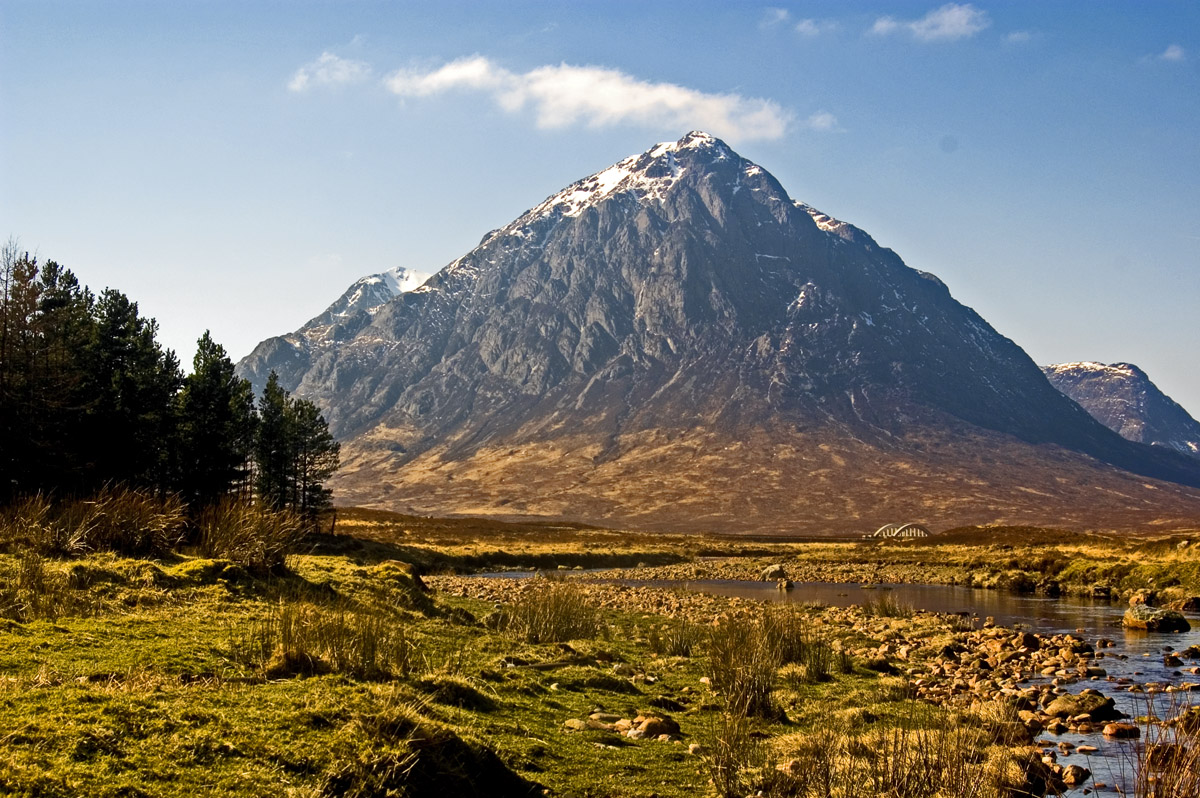
Stob Dearg in spring

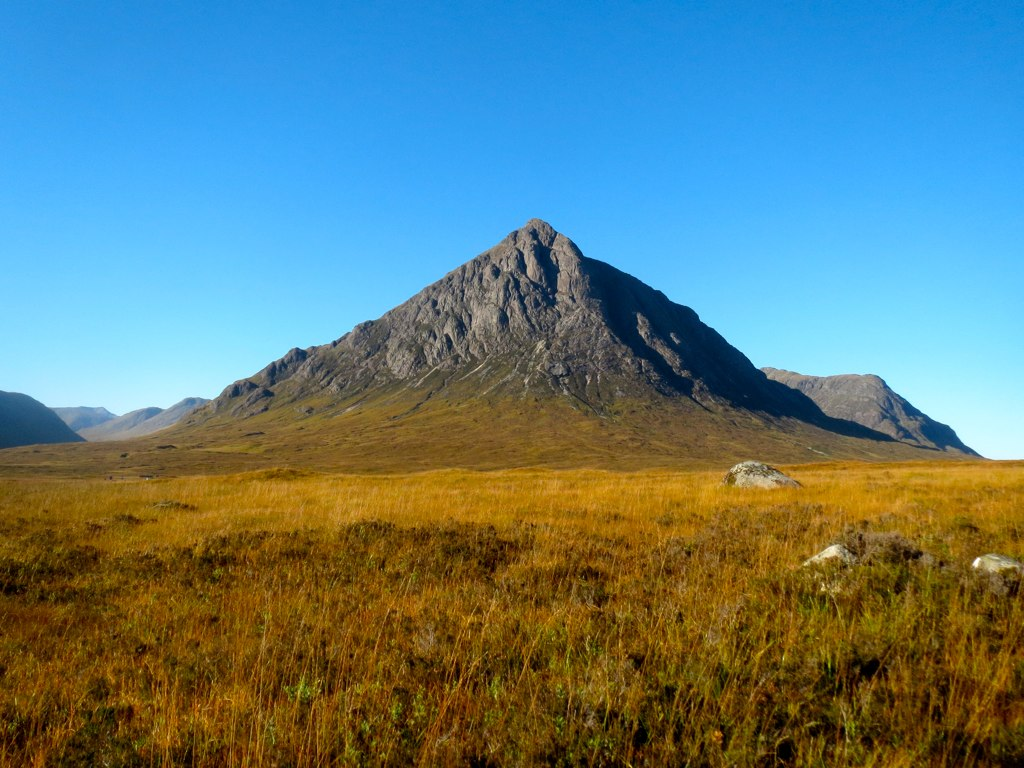
Stob Dearg in autumn

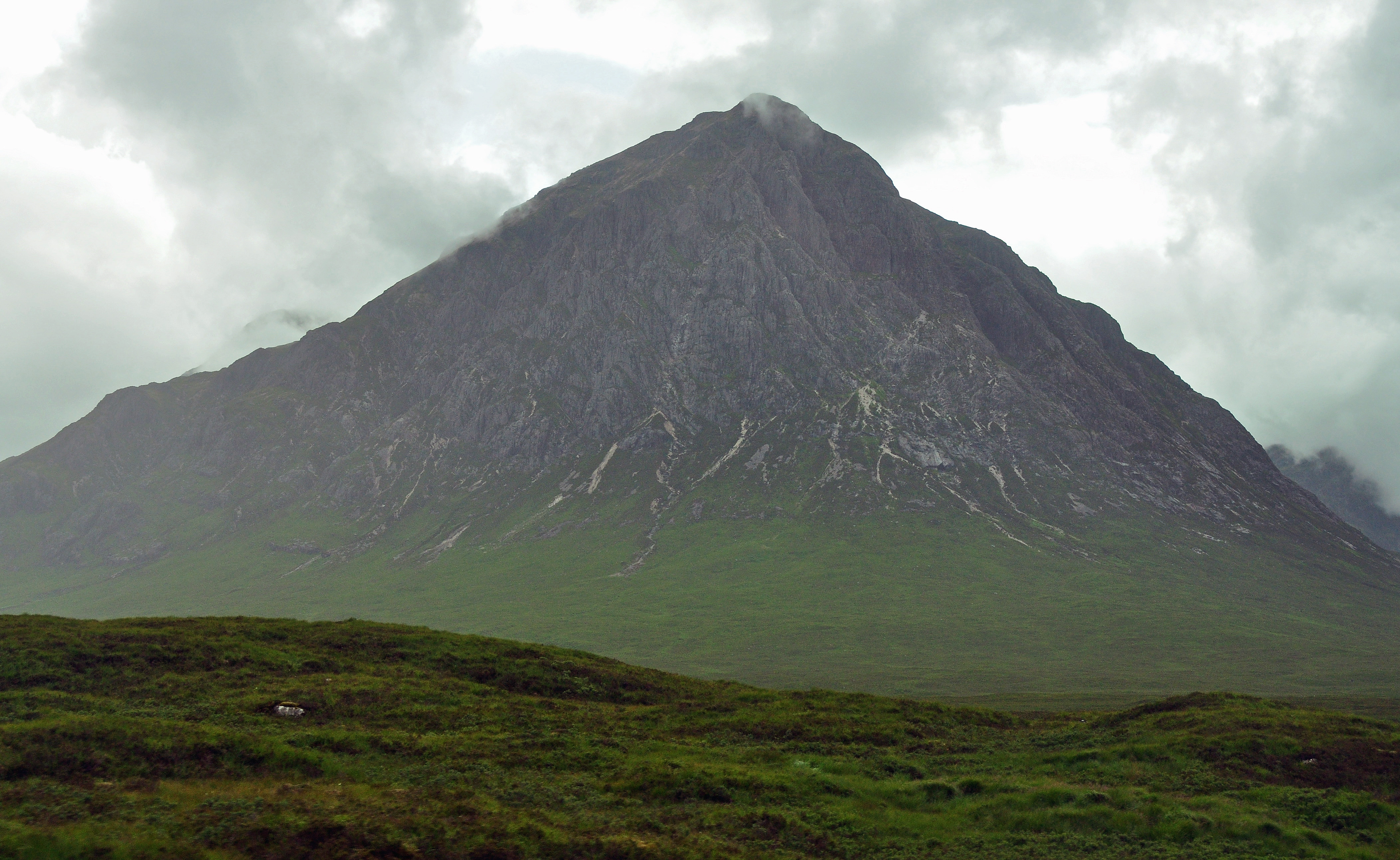
Stob Dearg in summer

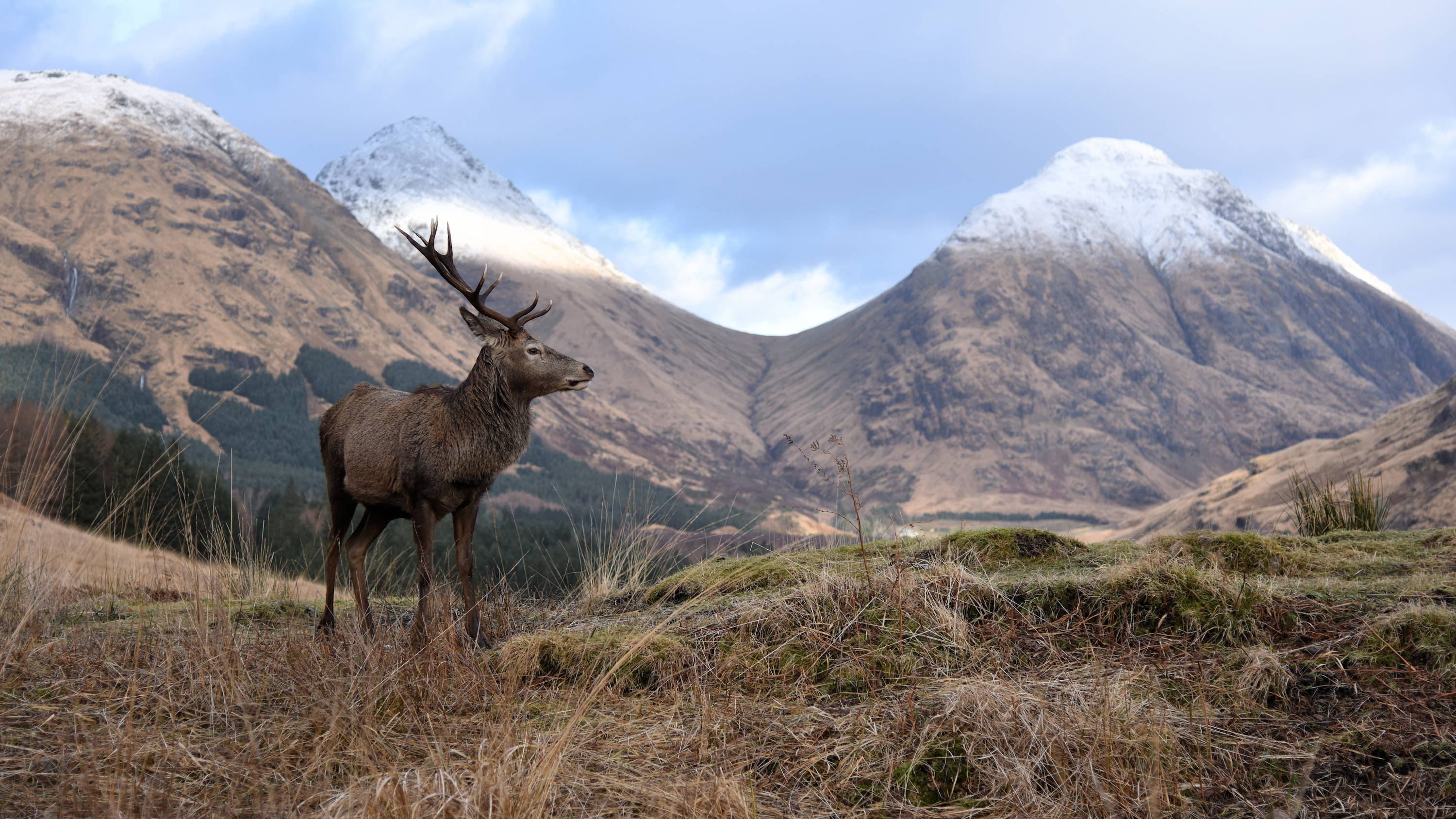
A red deer stag in Glen Etive, showing the south side of the Buachaille, with Stob na Bròige (right) and Stob Dubh (left)

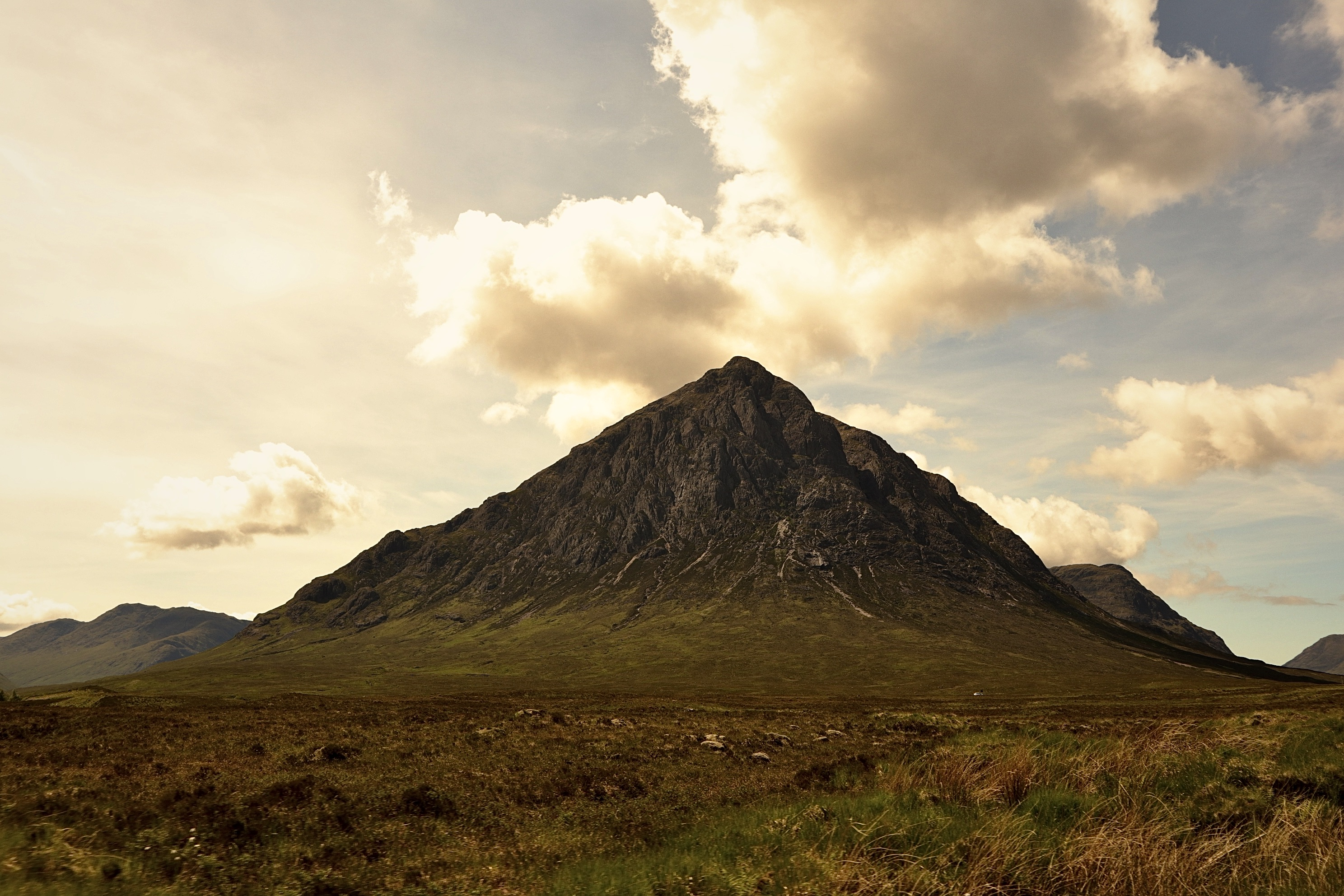
Buachaille Etive Mòr from the east side

== See also ==
- Mountains and hills of Scotland
- Scottish Highlands
