= Stob Coire Sgreamhach =

Mountain in Highland, Scotland

Coordinates: 56.63772°N 5.01167°W

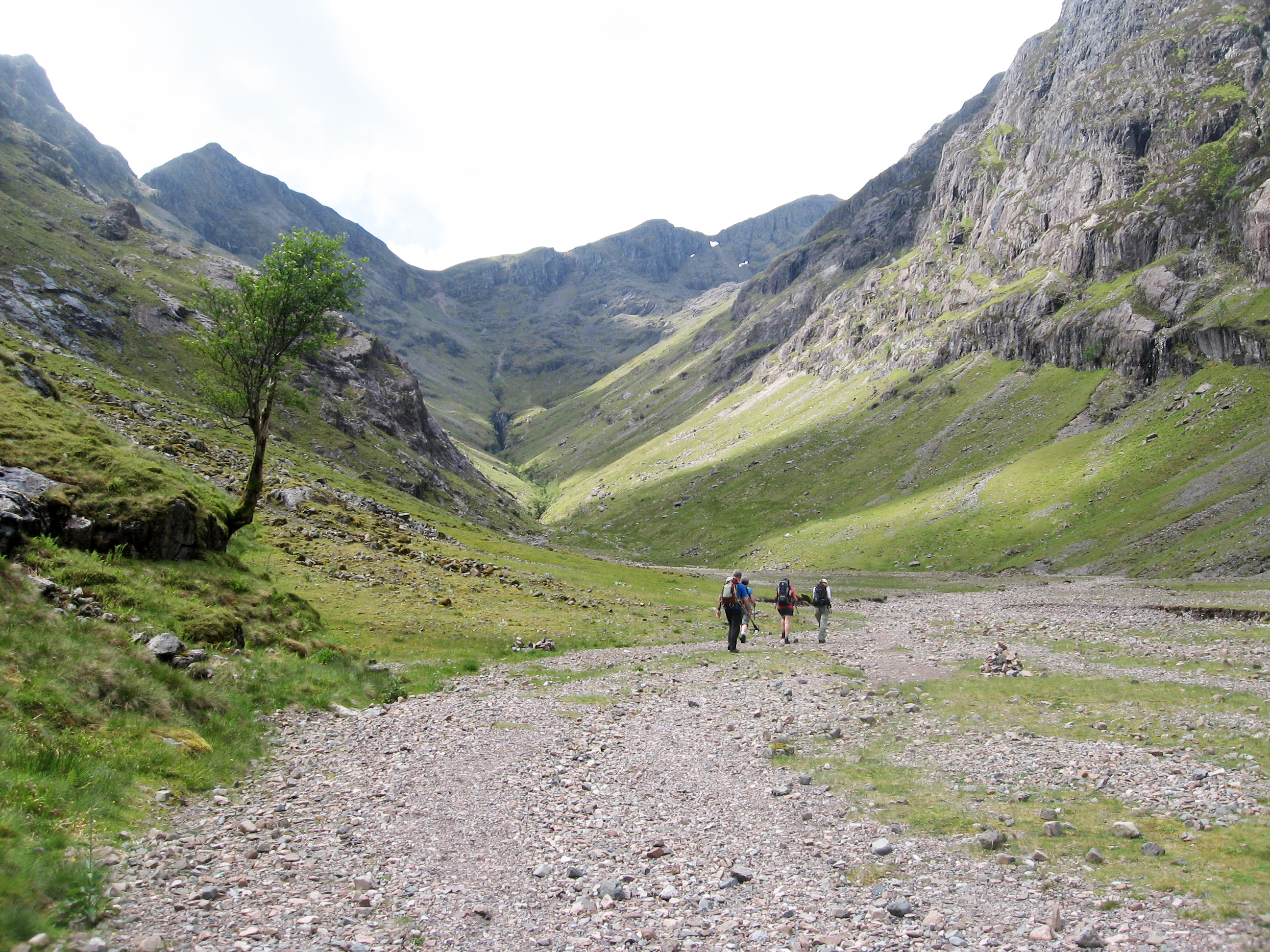
- Stob Coire Sgreamhach (peak left of centre) seen from Coire Gabhail, with the red scree of Bealach Dearg at the low point of the ridge

Highest point
- Elevation: 1,072 m (3,517 ft)
- Prominence: 128 m (420 ft)
- Parent peak: Bidean nam Bian
- Listing: Munro

Naming
- English translation: peak of the dreadful corrie
- Language of name: Gaelic
- Pronunciation: Scottish Gaelic: [ˈs̪t̪op ˈkʰɔɾʲə ˈs̪kɾʲɛ̃ũ.ɪç]

Geography
- Location: Glen Coe, Scotland
- Parent range: Grampian Mountains
- OS grid: NN154536
- Topo map: OS Landranger 41

Stob Coire Sgreamhach (Scottish Gaelic for 'peak of the dreadful corrie') is a mountain in Lorn, south of Glen Coe in the Scottish Highlands. Its height is 1,072 metres (3,517 ft). It is part of the Bidean nam Bian massif and is often considered a subsidiary peak of Bidean, though since the 1997 revision of Munros Tables it has been classified as a separate Munro. To the northeast is the ridge of Beinn Fhada ('the long mountain').

The mountain is usually climbed together with Bidean nam Bian, thus allowing for a traverse of the range. One of the most common routes from Glen Coe is to ascend the head of Coire Gabhail (the 'Hidden Glen' or 'Lost Valley') to reach the bealach between Stob Coire Sgreamhach and Bidean nam Bian. The wide floor of this corrie is hidden from view when seen from Glen Coe, and was used by the local Clan MacDonald to hide livestock, whether their own or stolen on raids.

Another route of ascent is via Beinn Fhada, the most easterly of the famous Three Sisters of Glen Coe. This route also starts from Coire Gabhail, but then climbs steeply up the ridge that marks the southeastern edge of the glen. Stob Coire Sgreamhach may also be climbed from Glen Etive to the southeast by way of a steep rocky ridge.

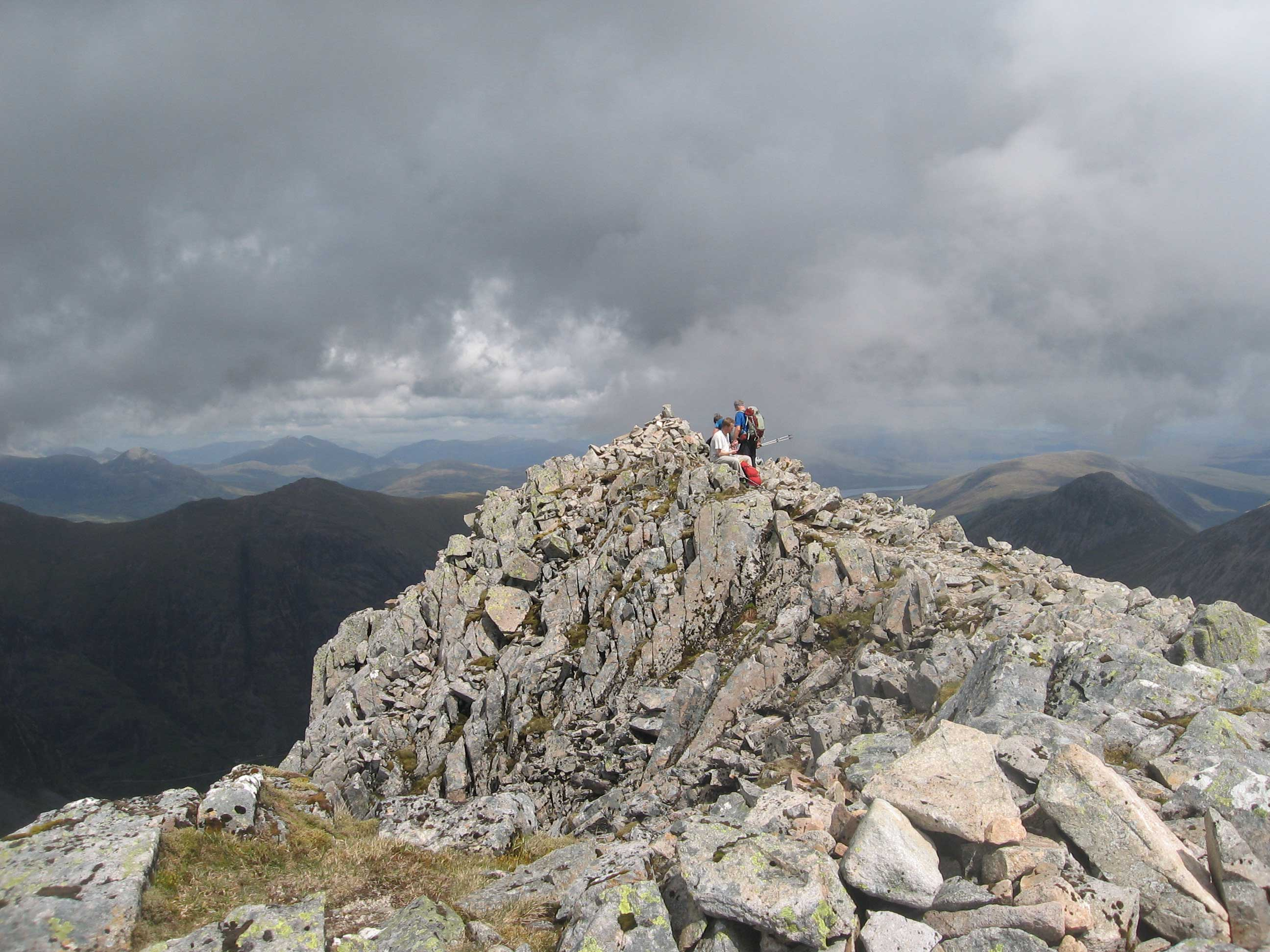
View east along the ridge to the summit of Stob Coire Sgreamhach.
