= 2009 Buachaille Etive Mòr avalanche =

Avalanche in Scotland

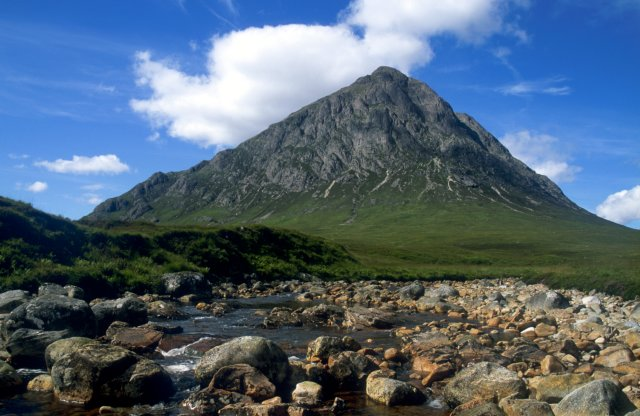
- Buachaille Etive Mòr viewed from Glen Etive
- Date: 24 January 2009
- Time: 12:00 GMT (UTC)
- Location: Buachaille Etive Mòr, Scottish Highlands, United Kingdom; 56°38′50″N 4°53′52″W
- Cause: Snow disturbed by mountain climbers
- Deaths: 3
- Injuries: 1 serious, 5 minor

The 2009 Buachaille Etive Mòr avalanche happened on Buachaille Etive Mòr in Glen Coe in the Scottish Highlands, UK, on 24 January 2009. Three mountain climbers were killed and one sustained a serious shoulder injury. Two of the dead were from Northern Ireland and the other was from Scotland. Nine people from at least three countries in at least two parties were involved in the incident on a mountain that is well recognised by tourists to Scotland. While avalanches are not uncommon in the area, very few deaths are reported—this incident has been described as "one of the worst disasters in the Scottish mountains for decades".

== Geography ==
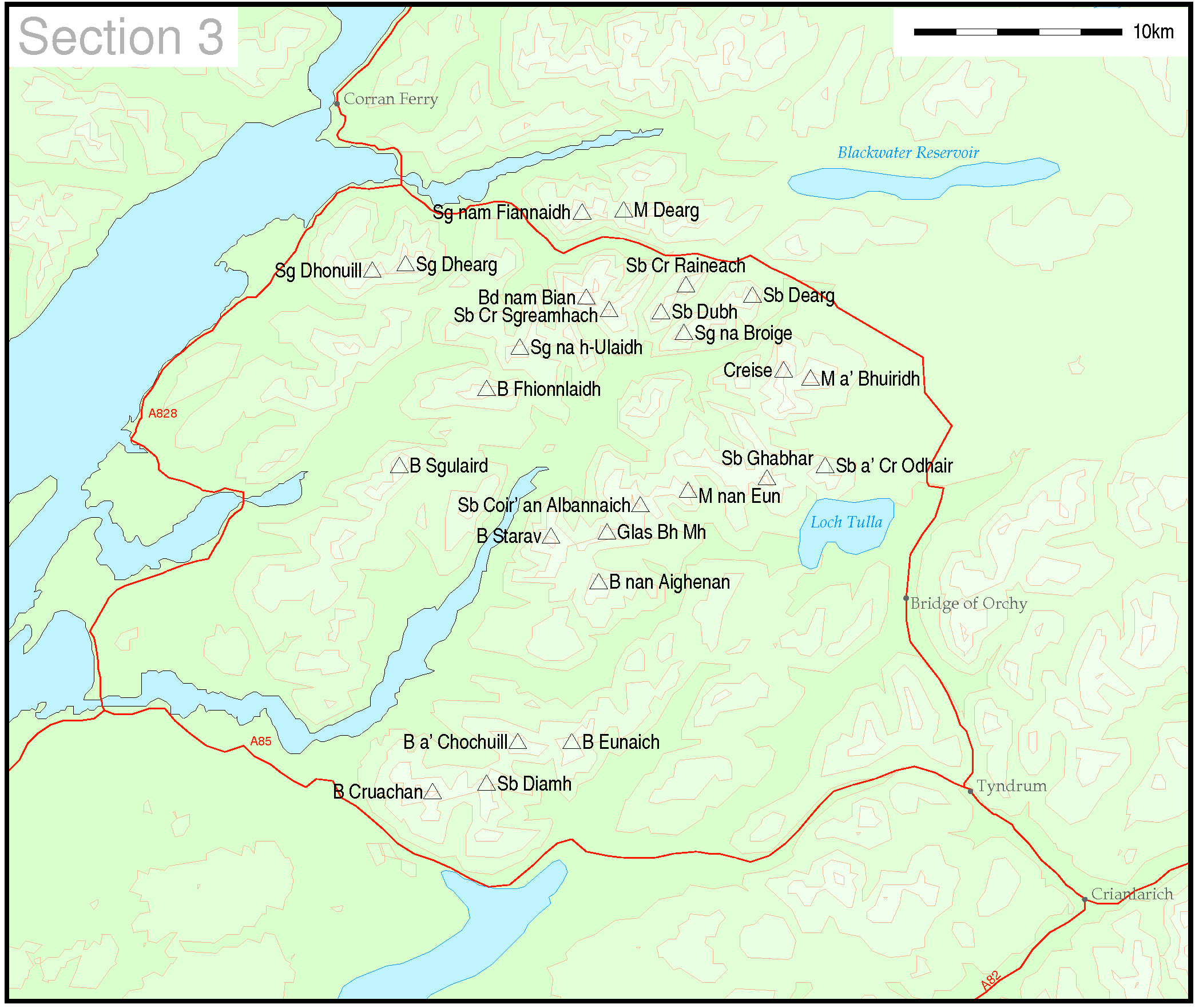
Map of Glen Coe and environs. Two of the main summits of Buachaille Etive Mòr are marked as "Sb Dearg" and "Sb na Broige".

The avalanche occurred in the Coire na Tulaich area of the mountain. Coire na Tulaich affords a relatively easy (but steep) ascent of the mountain in summer conditions and is also the main ascent route for hill walkers. This corrie has a history of previous avalanches. The last fatal avalanche before this incident occurred in February 1995, resulting in the deaths of three people.

Buachaille Etive Mòr (which means "the great herdsman of Etive") is a popular destination for hill walkers and climbers. There are two Munros on the ridge of Buachaille Etive Mòr. Stob Dearg is the highest peak on the ridge and is the one seen from the A82 road, the other Munro summit being Stob na Bròige.

== Climbers ==
According to John Grieve, the leader of Glencoe Mountain Rescue Team, the nine caught in the avalanche appeared to consist of two parties, one made up of seven friends, both Scottish and English, and a pair of climbers. One of the men suffered a serious shoulder injury.

== Search and rescue effort ==
Following the avalanche at 12:00 UTC, a major search and rescue operation was carried out in blizzard conditions. Rescue helicopters were involved alongside members of Glencoe Mountain Rescue Team who were aided by detection dogs. First to arrive at the scene was the RAF rescue helicopter, Rescue 137, which had been diverted from an exercise in the area. A second helicopter, Rescue 177, was then scrambled from the Royal Navy station at HMS Gannet near Prestwick.

Upon their discovery at 15:00 UTC, the three climbers were airlifted off the mountain and taken to the Belford Hospital in Fort William by ambulance where they were pronounced dead at 17:00 UTC. A fourth person airlifted to hospital sustained a shoulder injury, and the remaining five people found on the mountain were described as "uninjured". The rest of the climbers were left on the mountain for a period as weather conditions prevented the helicopters from re-engaging in their search efforts.

== Cause ==
John Grieve said the avalanche was initiated by a climber who dislodged a huge sheet of snow, sending it down on the nine other climbers who were swept 500 feet (150 m) downhill. The climber avoided being swept away by digging into the mountain with his ice axe before he composed himself to alert the emergency services. The surviving climbers had begun to unearth their friends' bodies from the snow with their ice axes by the time the rescue team had arrived. Fifty-year-old Jim Coyne from Lindsayfield, East Kilbride, said he and 53-year-old David Barr from Paisley, were on the mountain when a slab of snow came away from the peak. Barr sustained the shoulder injury. Coyne told of how they were just below the summit when the avalanche occurred, describing it as "massive" and saying they were

... engulfed and I managed to dig my way out. As I tried to get my bearings I saw an arm sticking out of the snow. It was Davie. I dug for 10 minutes using just my hands to get him free.

54-year-old Tom Richardson, an experienced climber from Sheffield in England, also had a narrow escape and subsequently alerted the emergency services.

The three casualties were named as Eamonn Murphy, 61, John Murphy, 63 and Brian Murray.

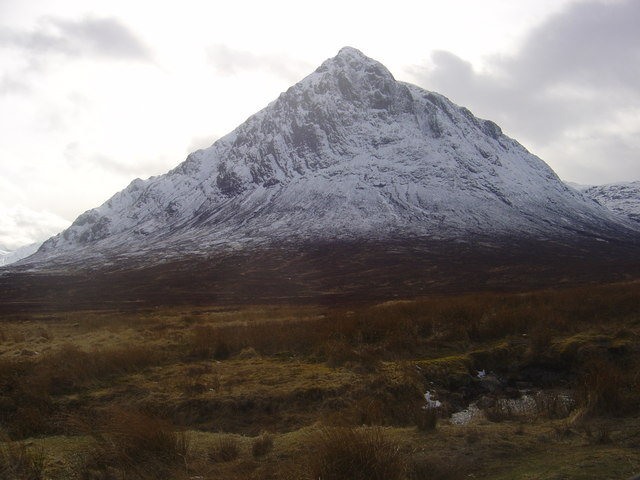
The incident occurred in the Coire na Tulaich area of popular Buachaille Etive Mòr (pictured above).

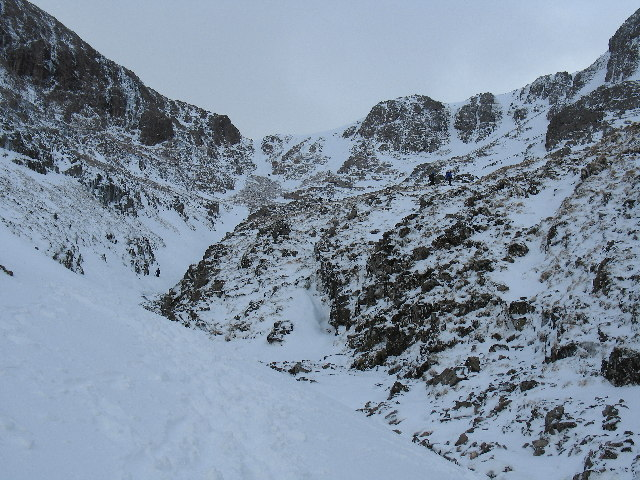
Coire na Tulaich on Buachaille Etive Mòr.

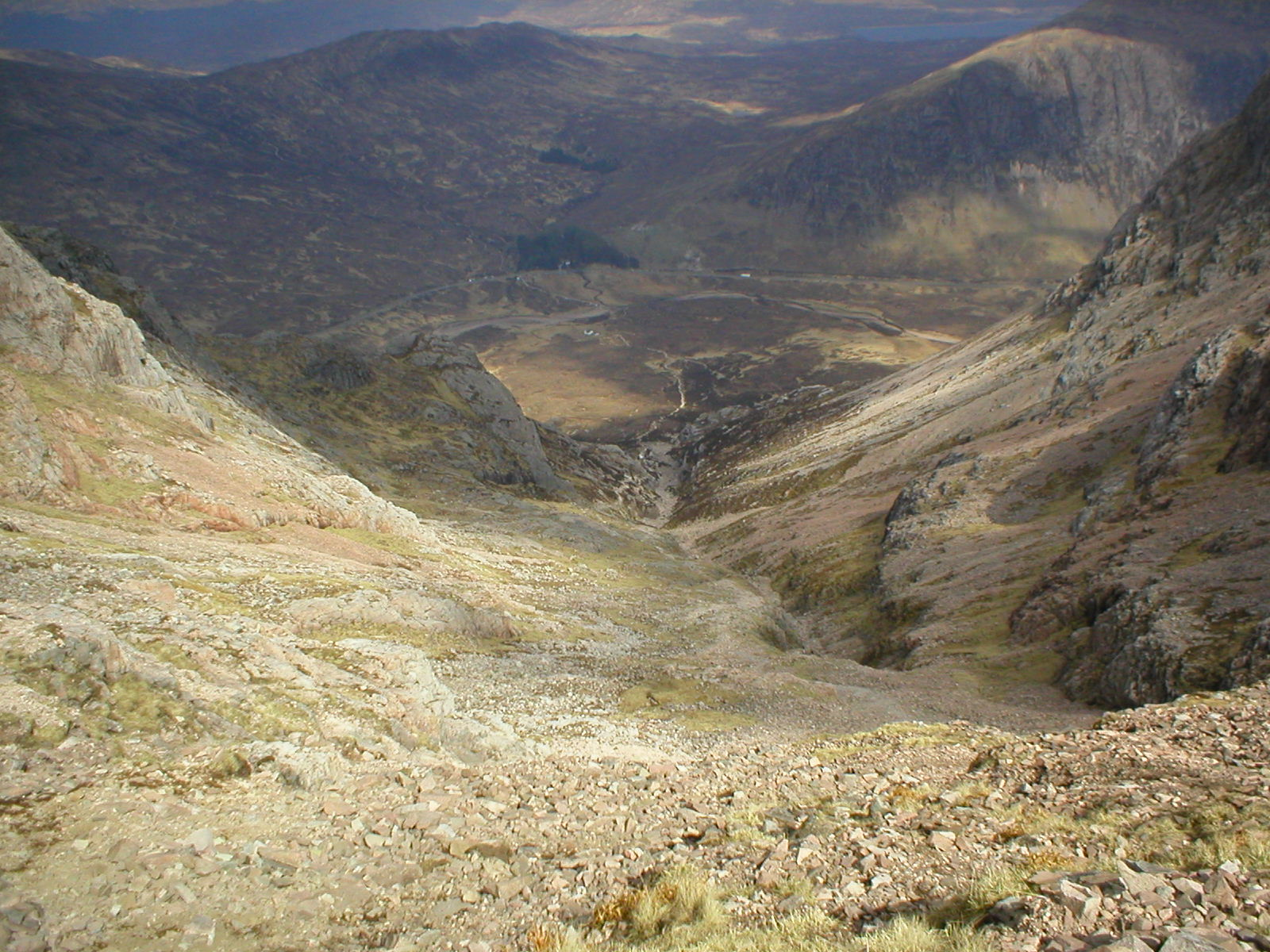
Looking north towards the A82 road in Glen Coe from upper Coire na Tulaich on Buachaille Etive Mòr.
