= Glencoe Waterfall =

Valley in Scotland

Coordinates: 56.66221°N 4.96558°W

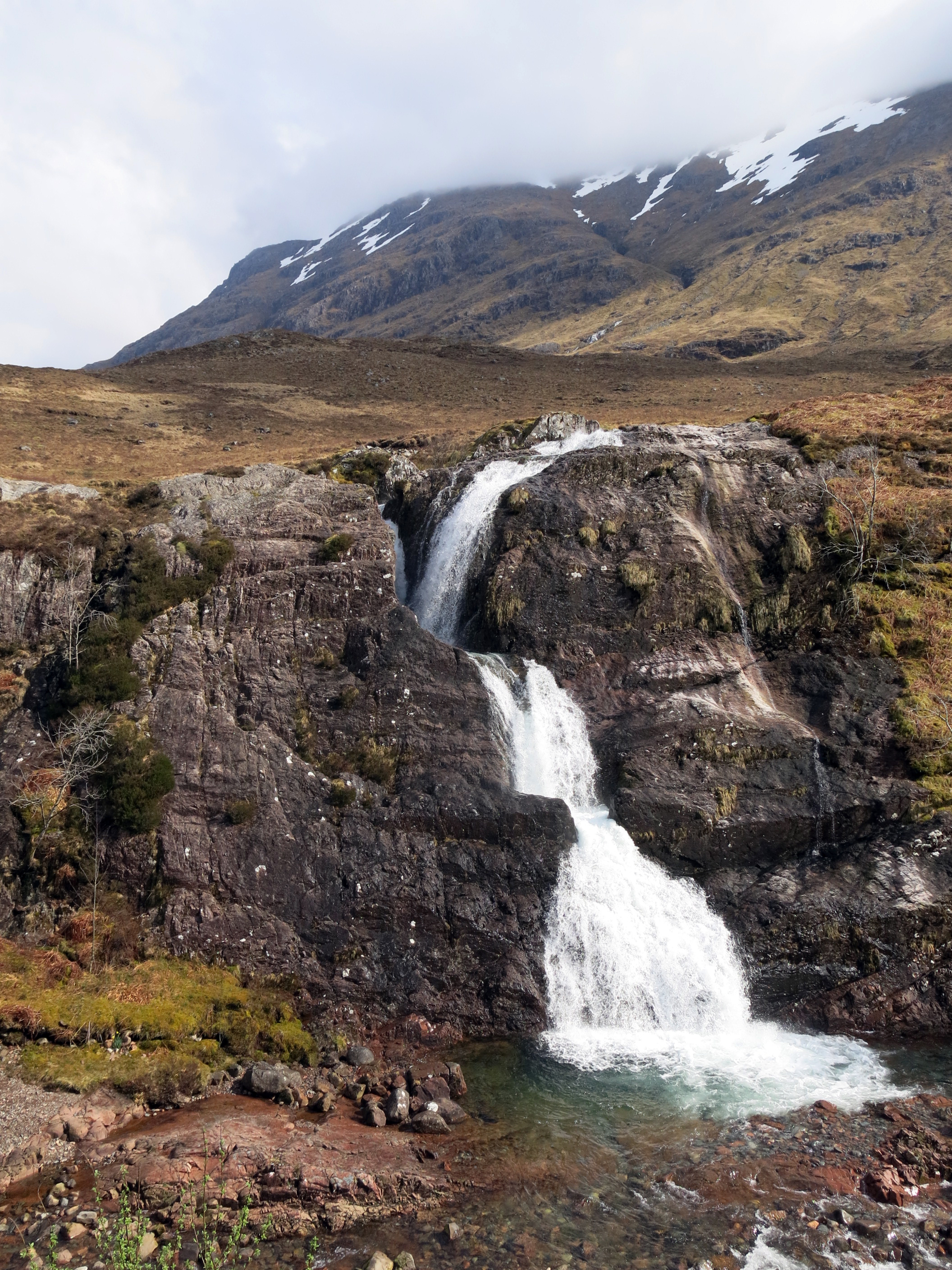
Glencoe Waterfall, with the snowy peak of Stob Coire Raineach in the background

The Glencoe Waterfall is a waterfall in the west highlands of Scotland. It is situated on the A82 between Glen Coe Village and Altnafeadh. This is where the Allt Lairig Eilde meets the river Coe, and falls approx. 20m into the river.

The falls are at the head of a series of low contracted falls, which continue down the river as far as the Meeting of Three Waters.
