= Three Waters =

Three Waters may refer to:

- Three Waters reform programme, a water services restructuring programme in New Zealand that was subsequently renamed the Water Services Reform Programme.
- Threewaters, a town in England
- Three Waters Mountain in Wyoming
- Meeting of Three Waters, a waterfall in Scotland
