= Beinn a' Chrulaiste =

Mountain to the north of Glen Coe, in the Highlands of Scotland

Beinn a' Chrùlaiste
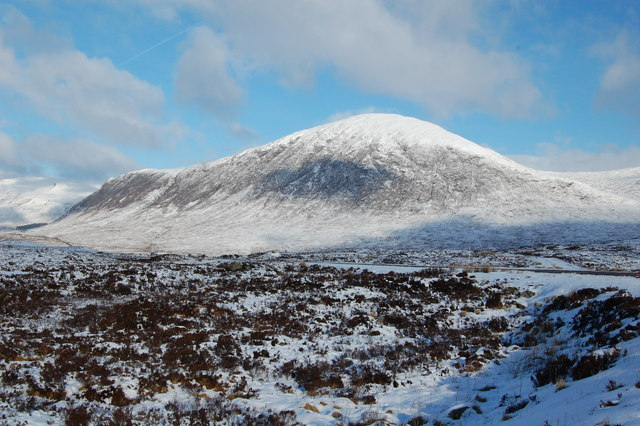
- A winter view of the mountain

Highest point
- Elevation: 857 m (2,812 ft)
- Prominence: 464 m (1,522 ft)
- Listing: Corbett, Marilyn
- Coordinates: 56°40′08″N 4°51′49″W

Naming
- English translation: Rocky Hill
- Language of name: Gaelic

Geography
- Location within Scotland
- Location: Glen Coe, Scotland
- Parent range: Grampian Mountains
- OS grid: NN246567
- Topo map: OS Landranger 41

Beinn a' Chrùlaiste is a mountain to the north east of Glen Coe, in the Highlands of Scotland. The mountain is roughly triangular, rising steeply north of the A82 road and the Old Military Road (West Highland Way) opposite Stob Dearg (Buachaille Etive Mòr). Beinn a' Chrulaiste stands at 857 m (2,811 ft) and has a prominence of 464 m (1,522 ft), making it a Corbett.

== Ascents ==
Beinn a' Chrùlaiste is typically climbed either from the Kings House Hotel to its south east or from Altnafeadh to the south west. The former route heads north up the Allt a' Bhalaich for 1.5 km to a height of about 350 m before bearing west north west up a broad ridge, which leads directly to the summit. The latter route, via the south west ridge of the mountain and the subsidiary summit of Stob Beinn a' Chrulaiste (639 m or 2,096 ft) has the benefit of fine views down Glen Coe and across the valley to Stob Dearg.

=== Incidents ===
In 2024, an experienced hillwalker was fatally injured on descent from the summit of Beinn a' Chrulaiste.

== See also ==
- Glen Coe
- Mountains and hills of Scotland
- Buachaille Etive Mòr
