= Meeting of Three Waters =

Coordinates: 56.66322°N 4.98086°W

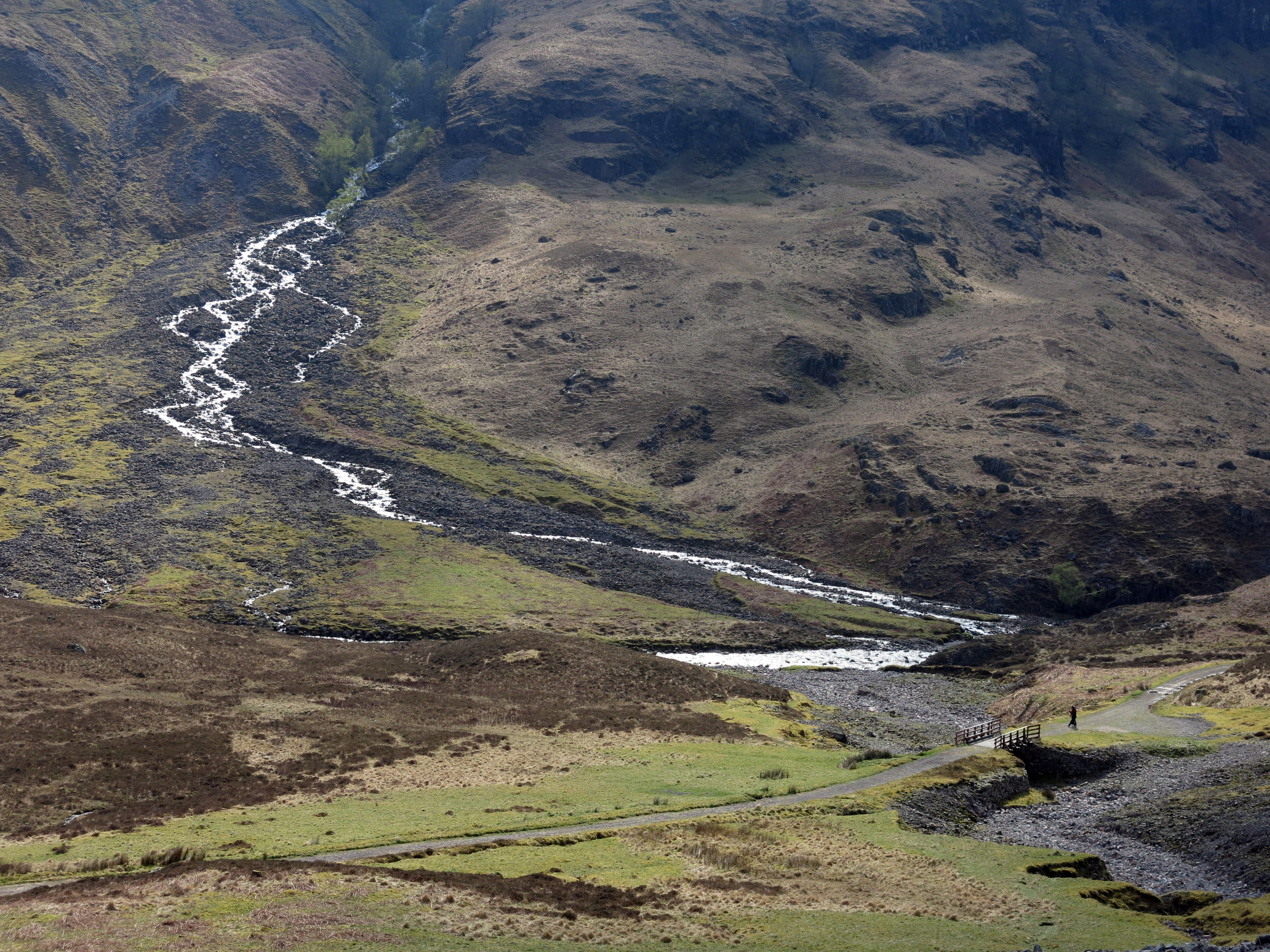
The Meeting of Three Waters: River Coe, Allt Doire-bheith and Allt Coire Gabhail

The Meeting of Three Waters is a distinct junction of three rivers in Glen Coe. The rivers join each other with almost right angles between each other due to the geology and faultlines that the rivers follow.

It is situated between the mouth of Coire Gabhail and the cottage of Allt-na-ruigh in Glen Coe, where the (rivers) Allt Coire Gabhail and Allt Doire-bheith join the River Coe. (It is clearly marked on official UK Ordnance Survey (OS) maps at grid reference NN17404 56361 and other maps using this official base data.)

The position has been recorded by Ordnance Survey as far back as the 1800s, as shown in the 1870 Survey on the National Library of Scotland's map collection.

== Confusion with waterfall upstream ==
While the Meeting of Three Waters is clearly marked on OS maps (as noted above), the name is now commonly attributed to the obvious waterfall of the Allt Lairig Eilde next to the A82 road through the glen. This fall is actually Glencoe Waterfall. This confusion is widespread and is now repeated across a large volume of online sources. Examples:
