= Buachaille Etive Beag =

Mountain in Scotland

- Buachaille Èite Beag
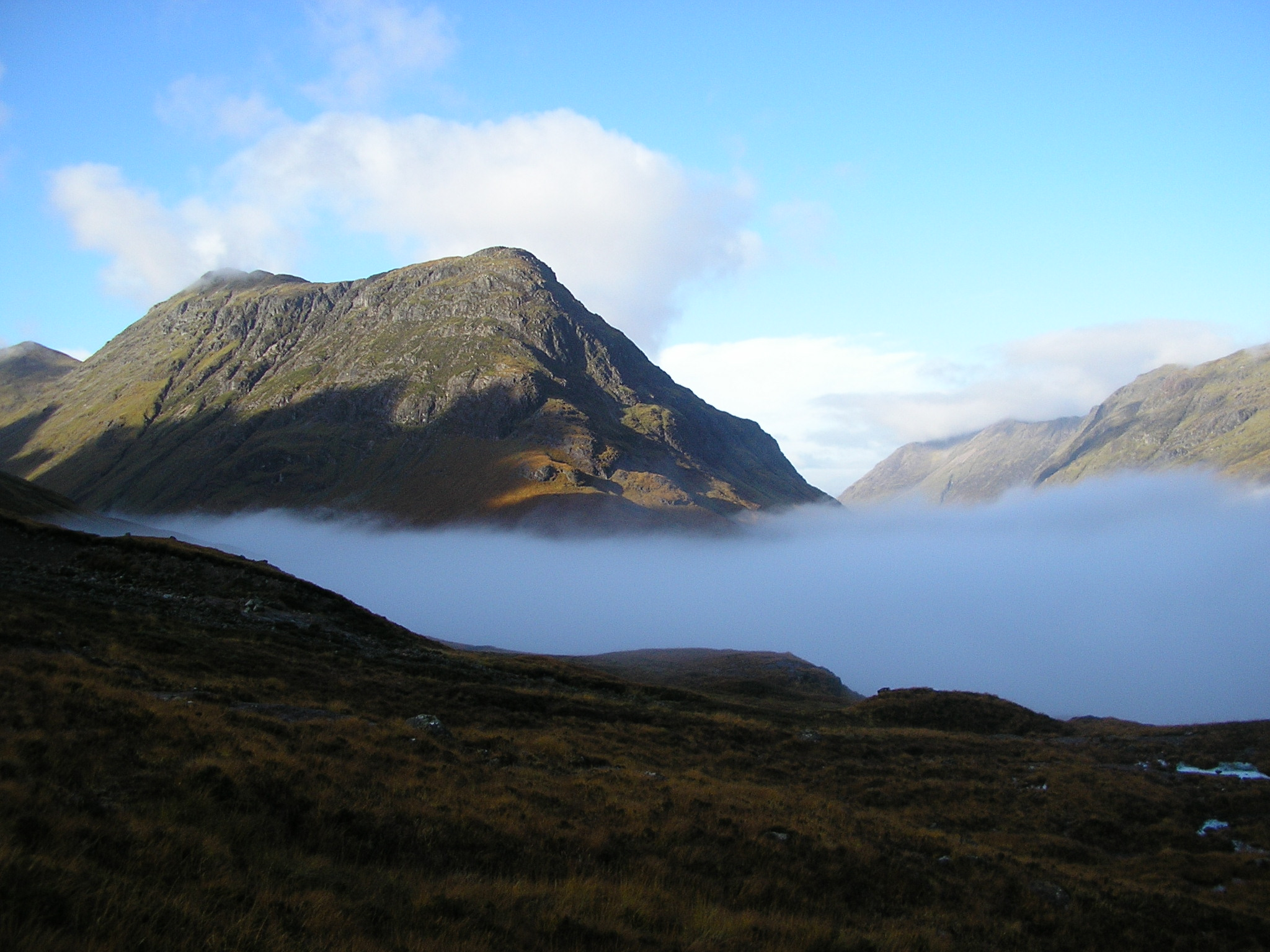
- The northern end of Buachaille Etive Beag, seen from Buachaille Etive Mòr

Highest point
- Elevation: 958 m (3,143 ft)
- Prominence: c. 468 m
- Parent peak: Buachaille Etive Mòr
- Listing: Munro, Marilyn
- Coordinates: 56.638159°N 4.970747°W

Naming
- English translation: little herdsman of Etive
- Language of name: Gaelic
- Pronunciation: Scottish Gaelic: [ˈpuəxəʎə ˈeʰtʲə ˈpek]

Geography
- Location: Glen Etive/Glen Coe, Scotland
- OS grid: NN179535
- Topo map: OS Landranger 41

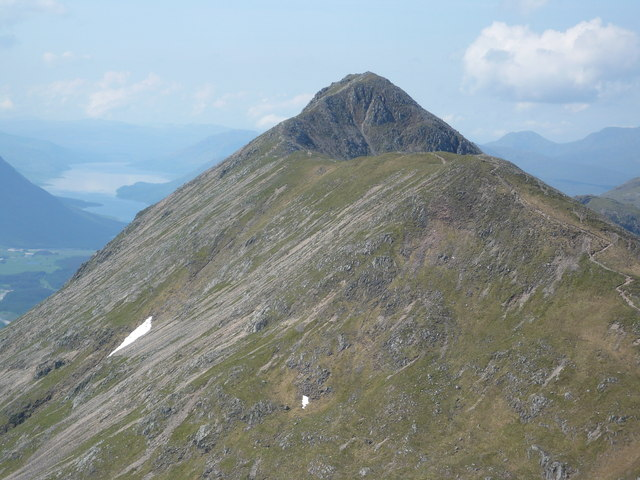
Stob Dubh

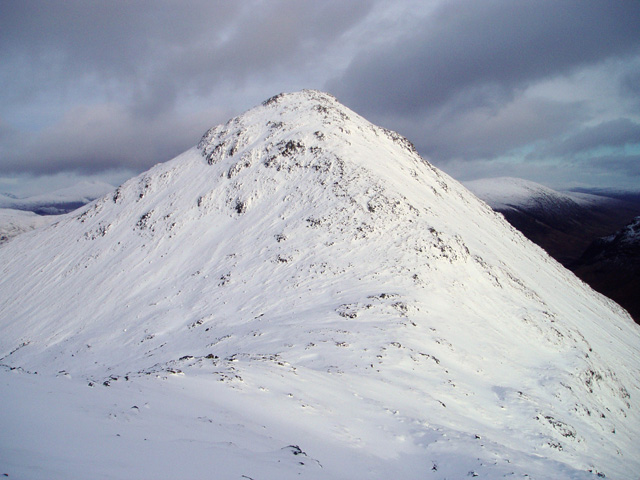
Stob Coire Raineach

Listed summits of Buachaille Etive Beag
| Name | Grid ref | Height | Status |
|---|---|---|---|
| Stob Dubh | NN179535 | 958 m (3,143 ft) | Munro, Marilyn |
| Stob Coire Raineach | NN191548 | 925 m (3,035 ft) | Munro, Marilyn |

Buachaille Etive Beag (/ˈbuəxeɪl ˈɛtɪv ˈbɛɡ/, Scottish Gaelic: Buachaille Èite Beag, 'little herdsman of Etive') is a mountain between Glen Coe and Glen Etive in the Highlands of Scotland. It lies west of Buachaille Etive Mòr, its larger neighbour, from which it is separated by a high mountain pass called Lairig Gartain.

Like its neighbour, Buachaille Etive Beag is a ridge about 3 km long that runs in a southwest–northeast direction. It has two peaks of Munro status: Stob Dubh (958 m) at the southern end, and Stob Coire Raineach (925 m) in the middle. The latter became a Munro in the 1997 revision of Munro's Tables, in which all tops with a topographic prominence of more than 500 feet (150 m) were promoted to full Munro status. The smaller peak at the northern end is Stob nan Cabar.

== Climbing ==
The most common route on the mountain starts from the A82 at the head of Glen Coe. A cairn and a sign mark the existence of a right-of-way to Glen Etive, following the through the Lairig Eilde that separates Buachaille Etive Beag from Bidean nam Bian. This route is followed for around 1.5 km, at which point most hillwalkers simply head up the hillside to reach the bealach between the two summits, which is at a height of around 750 m. From here Stob Coire Raineach lies about 0.5 km to the northeast, whilst Stob Dubh is about 2 km to the southwest. After bagging both tops, most walkers simply descend by their route of ascent. One may also reach (and descend from) the bealach by means of the Lairig Gartain, which separates Buachaille Etive Beag, from its larger sibling, Buachaille Etive Mor.

An alternative route would be to start from Glen Etive, thus allowing for a traverse of the ridge. The southwest ridge is unrelentingly steep, and one would be obliged to arrange transport back to Glen Etive or walk an additional 4 km to return via the Lairig Eilde or Lairig Gartain.
