= Bidean nam Bian =

Mountain in Scotland

Coordinates: 56.642768°N 5.029335°W

- Bidean nam Beann
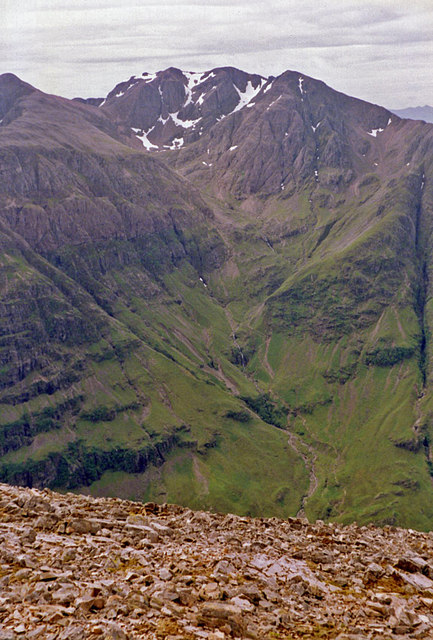
- Bidean nam Bian from Sgùrr nam Fiannaidh to the north, across Glen Coe

Highest point
- Elevation: 1,150 m (3,770 ft)
- Prominence: 845 m (2,772 ft)Ranked 22nd in British Isles
- Parent peak: Ben Nevis
- Listing: Munro, Marilyn, County top (Argyll)

Naming
- English translation: peak of the mountains
- Language of name: Gaelic
- Pronunciation: Scottish Gaelic: [ˈpitʲan nəm ˈpian] English approximation: BIT-yan-nəm-BEE-ahn

Geography
- Location: Lorne, Scotland
- Parent range: Grampian Mountains
- OS grid: NN143542
- Topo map: OS Landranger 41

Bidean nam Bian (Scottish Gaelic: Bidean nam Beann, "peak of the mountains") is the highest peak in a group of mountains south of Glen Coe and north of Glen Etive in the Scottish Highlands. With a height of 1,150 metres (3,770 ft), it is a Munro and the highest point in Argyll. It is a complex mountain with many ridges and subsidiary peaks, one of which, Stob Coire Sgreamhach, is classified as a separate Munro.

== Landscape ==
The most noticeable features of the Bidean nam Bian massif are the famous Three Sisters of Glen Coe, three steeply-sided ridges that extend north into the Glen. Two of the sisters, Gearr Aonach ('short ridge') and Aonach Dubh ('black ridge') converge at Stob Coire nan Lochan, a 1,115-metre (3,658 ft) subsidiary peak of Bidean nam Bian that lies about 1km to the northeast of the actual summit. The final, most easterly sister, Beinn Fhada ('long mountain'), joins the Bidean nam Bian massif at the summit of Stob Coire Sgreamhach.

Beinn Fhada is separated from Gearr Aonach by a glen known as Coire Gabhail ('glen of the capture'), often known as the 'Hidden' or 'Lost Valley', as it has a wide flat area concealed from Glen Coe by the landslip which blocked the entrance and allowed a loch to form. The glen was used by Clan MacDonald to hide their livestock from raiders or hide cattle they themselves had stolen. The steep rough path up from Glen Coe skirts a wooded ravine and is a popular short walk (around 4 kilometres or 2 1/2 miles in total), though it involves a river crossing and some rocky sections.

Listed summits of Bidean nam Bian
Name	Grid ref	Height	Status
Bidean nam Bian	NN143542	1150 m (3773 ft)	Munro, Marilyn
Stob Coire nan Lochan	NN148548	1115 m (3658 ft)	Munro top
Stob Coire nam Beith	NN139545	1107 m (3632 ft)	Munro top
Stob Coire Sgreamhach	NN154536	1072 m (3517 ft)	Munro

== Ascent routes ==
There are several routes to the summit of Bidean nam Bian. One may continue from Coire Gabhail (known as the Hidden Valley of Glencoe), reaching the main ridge by means of a zig-zag path that climbs up the flank of Gearr Aonach to cliffs at the head of the corrie, and a patch of scree at the bealach up to the ridge. From here, turn left to climb Stob Coire Sgreamhach which lies only about 0.5 km to the southeast, or right to traverse along the cliff edge towards the summit of Bidean.

Other routes include ascending Stob Coire nan Lochan and then using the connecting ridge to reach the main summit, or ascending via the Allt Coire nam Beitheach and following either branch of this burn to reach the main ridge either side of the subsidiary peak of Stob Coire nam Beith, which lies about a kilometre to the west of the main summit.

All of the above routes start from Glen Coe and go through the corries running between the Three Sisters, and may thus be combined to allow a traverse of the mountain. Due to the accessibility of Bidean from the north, routes on the southern side are used much less frequently.

== Incidents ==
On 19 January 2013 four people were killed in an avalanche close to Church Door Buttress on the north side of Bidean nam Bian. A fifth person was airlifted to hospital with serious injuries and a sixth escaped unharmed. It was the worst avalanche in Scottish history and the worst in the UK since the Lewes avalanche in 1836.

In 2024, the bodies of a father and son from Cheshire, England were found near Stob Coire nan Lochan after the pair had been fatally injured while hillwalking.

== Gallery ==
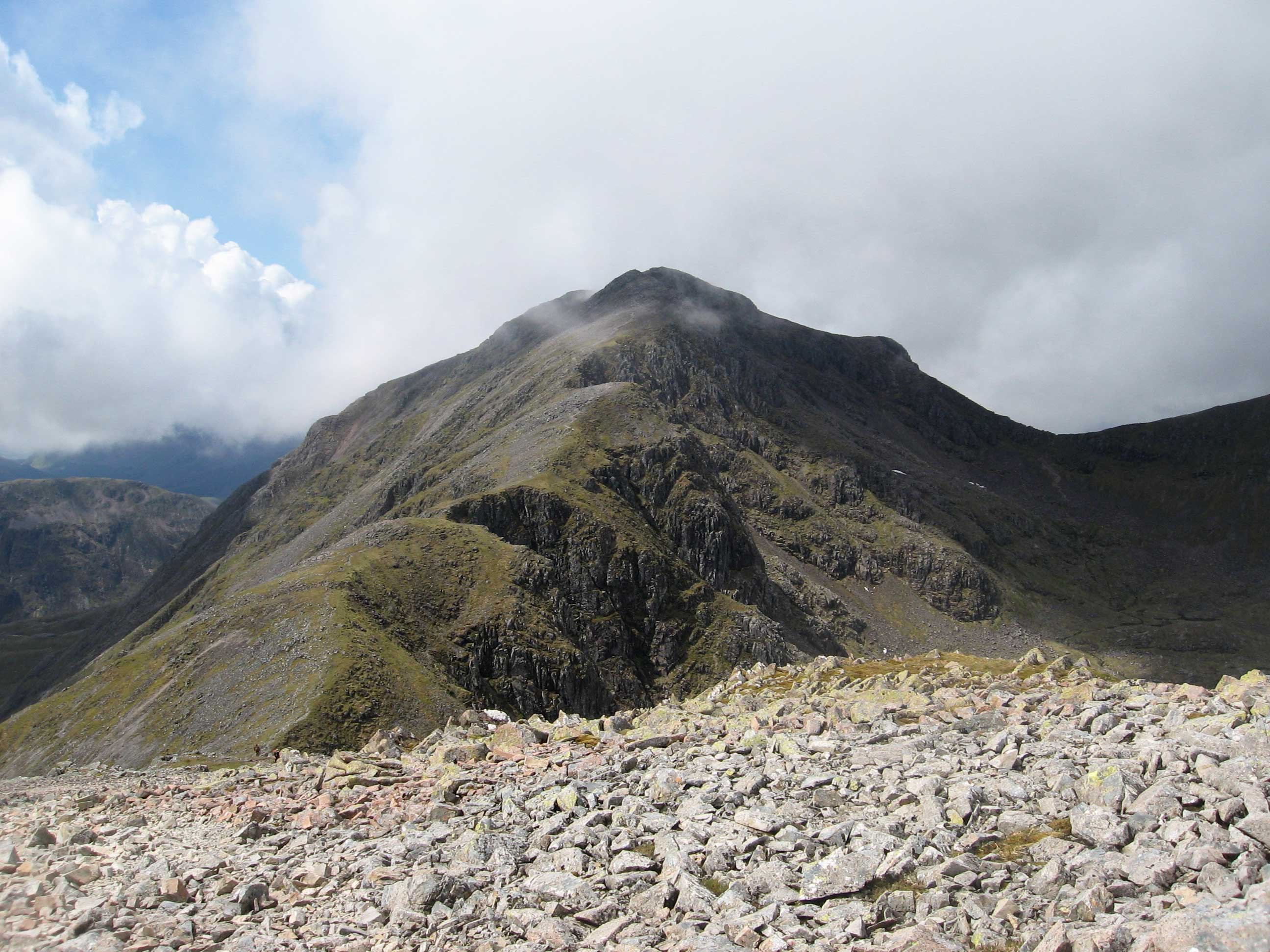
Bidean nam Bian from Stob Coire Sgreamhach

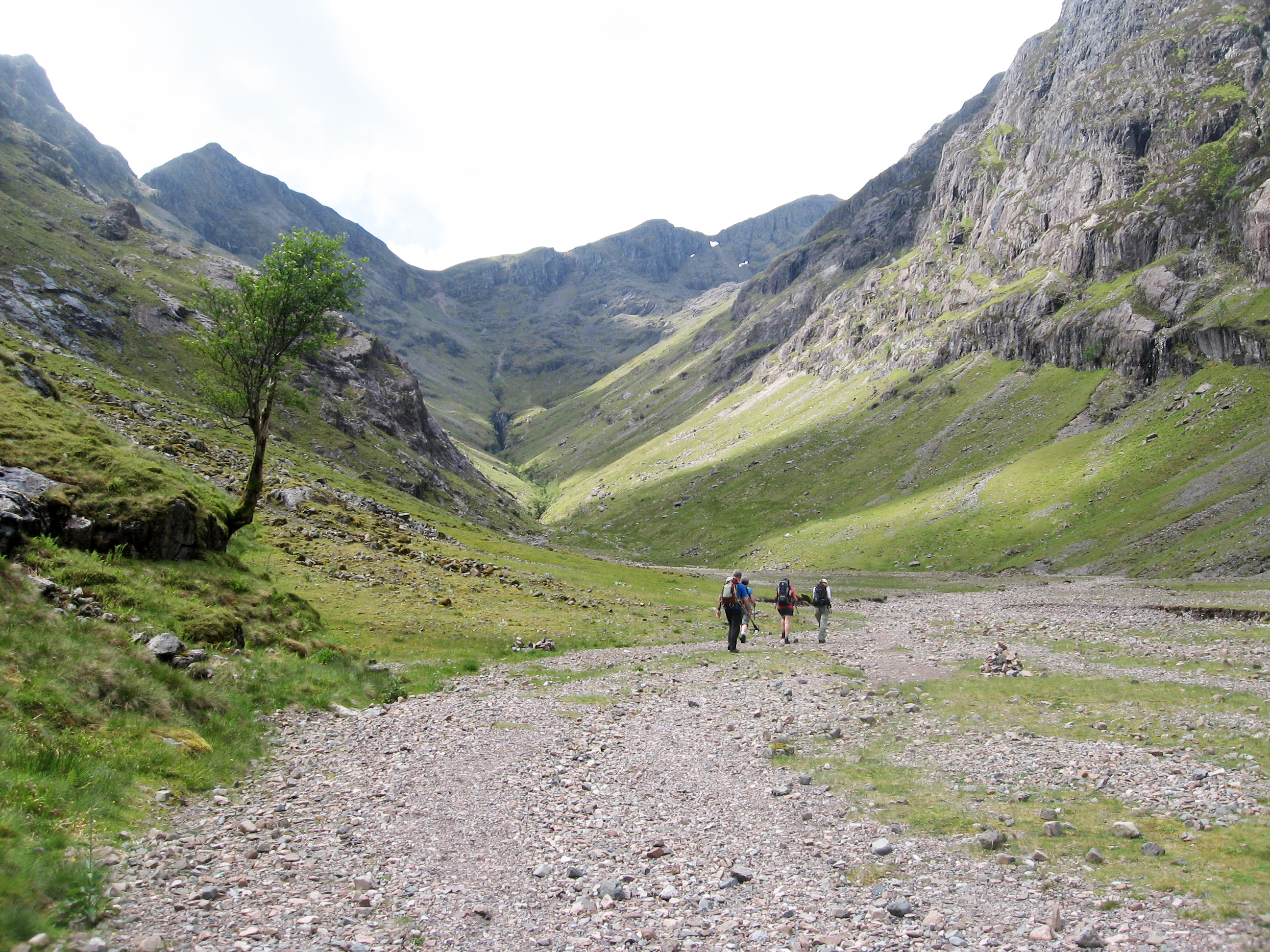
Coire Gabhail, the Lost Valley or Hidden Glen, leads up to the Bidean ridge: the peak of Stob Coire Sgreamhach is left of centre, with the slopes of Gearr Aonach to the right

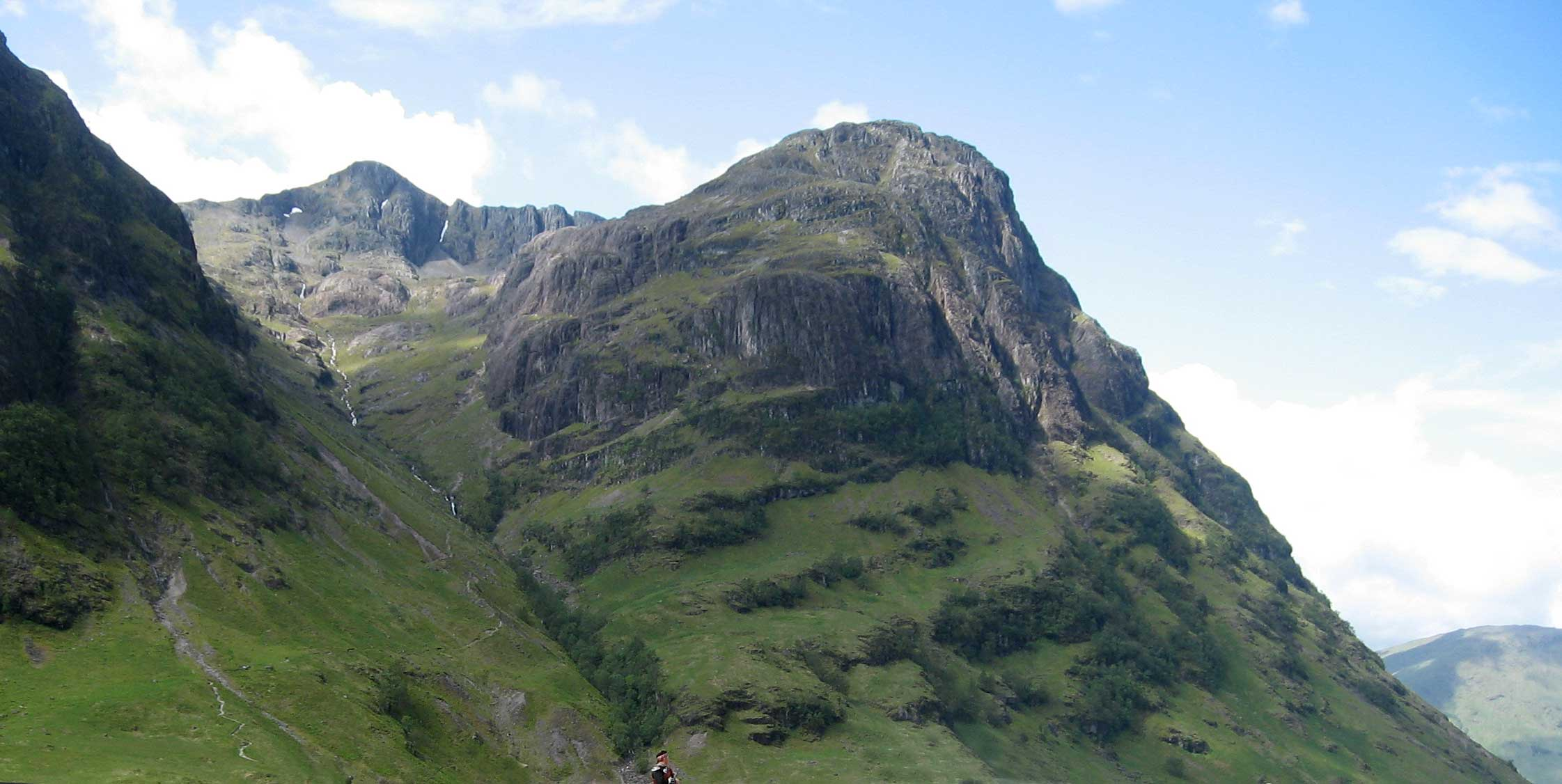
View from Glen Coe car park, looking up Coire nan Lochan to Stob Coire nan Lochan, with Aonach Dubh to the right

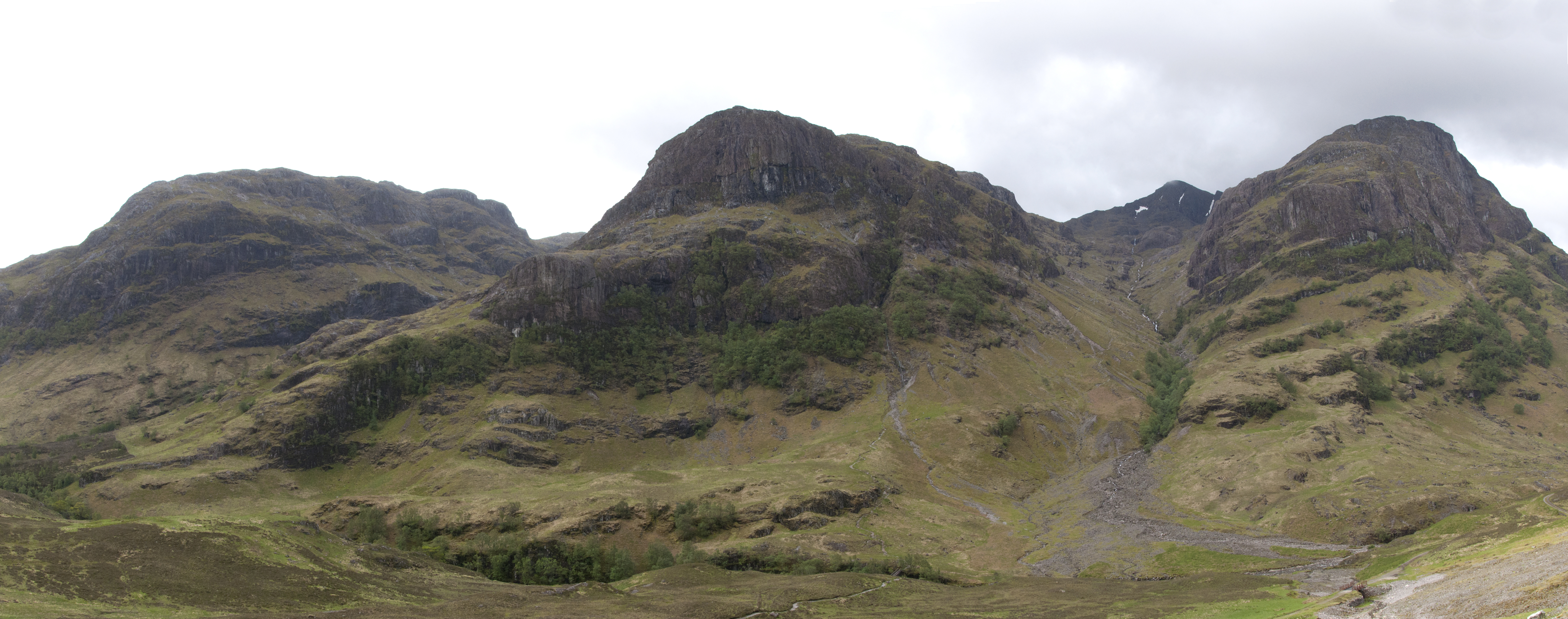
The Three Sisters, seen from Glen Coe: Beinn Fhada, Gearr Aonach, and Aonach Dubh

== See also ==
- Ben Nevis
- Mountains and hills of Scotland
