= Coire Gabhail =

Valley in Highland, Scotland

Coordinates: 56.65441°N 4.99400°W

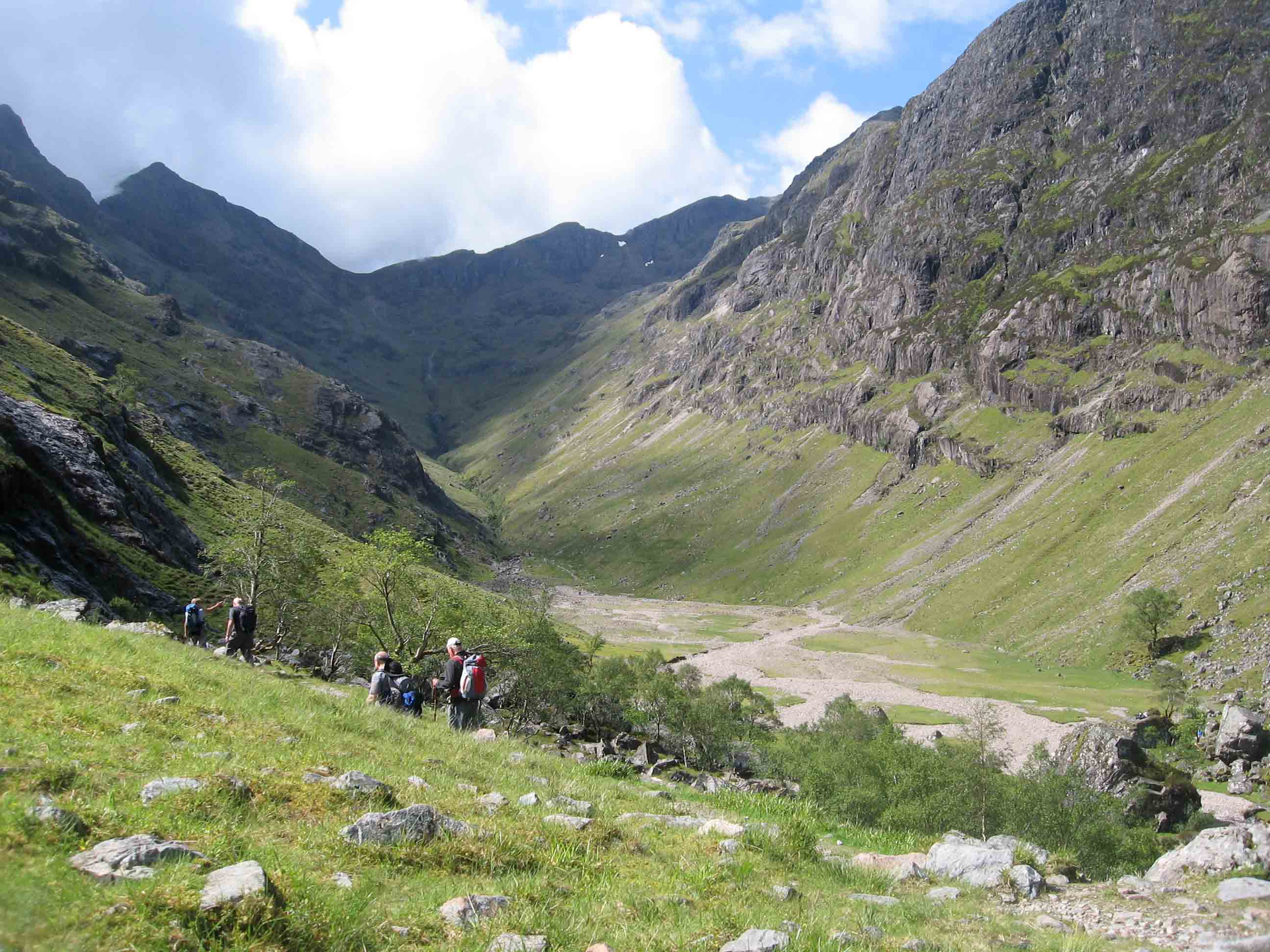
Entrance to Coire Gabhail over the shoulder formed by a landslip, looking southwest over the flat corrie floor to cliffs and the peak of Stob Coire Sgreamhach.

Coire Gabhail (Corrie of the Bounty, or The Hollow of Capture) is a high level glen in the Bidean nam Bian mountain massif to the south of Glen Coe, Highland, Scotland. Its narrow entrance 230 metres (750 ft) up the hillside conceals the width of the glen beyond, and it is commonly known as the Hidden Valley or Lost Valley of Glencoe. Access from a bridge crossing the River Coe is by a steep path up beside a narrow wooded ravine.

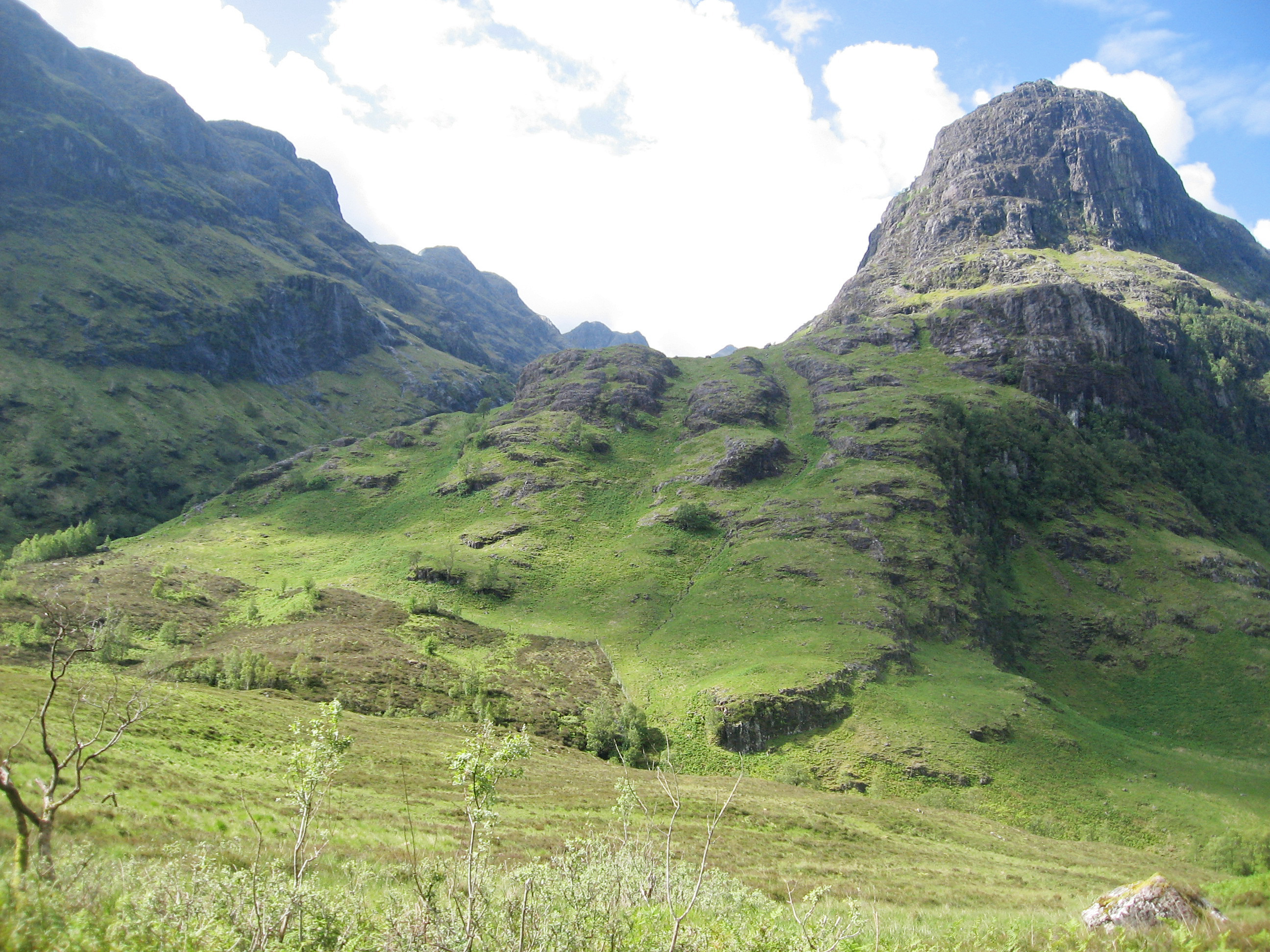
Access from Glen Coe, via a wooded ravine between Beinn Fhada and Gearr Aonach, seen over River Coe

Coire Gabhail runs southwestwards between the steeply-sided ridges of two of "The Three Sisters"; on its left, Beinn Fhada (Long Hill) is the eastmost sister, and the central sister Gearr Aonach (Short Ridge) on the right of the corrie forms its western side. Further to the west of Gearr Aonach, Coire nan Lochan is enclosed by Aonach Dubh (Black Ridge).

The southern end of Coire Gabhail is marked by the peak of Stob Coire Sgreamhach on the ridge which then slopes down westwards to its low point at Bealach Dearg, then continues up above cliffs to the summit of Bidean nam Bian.

== History ==
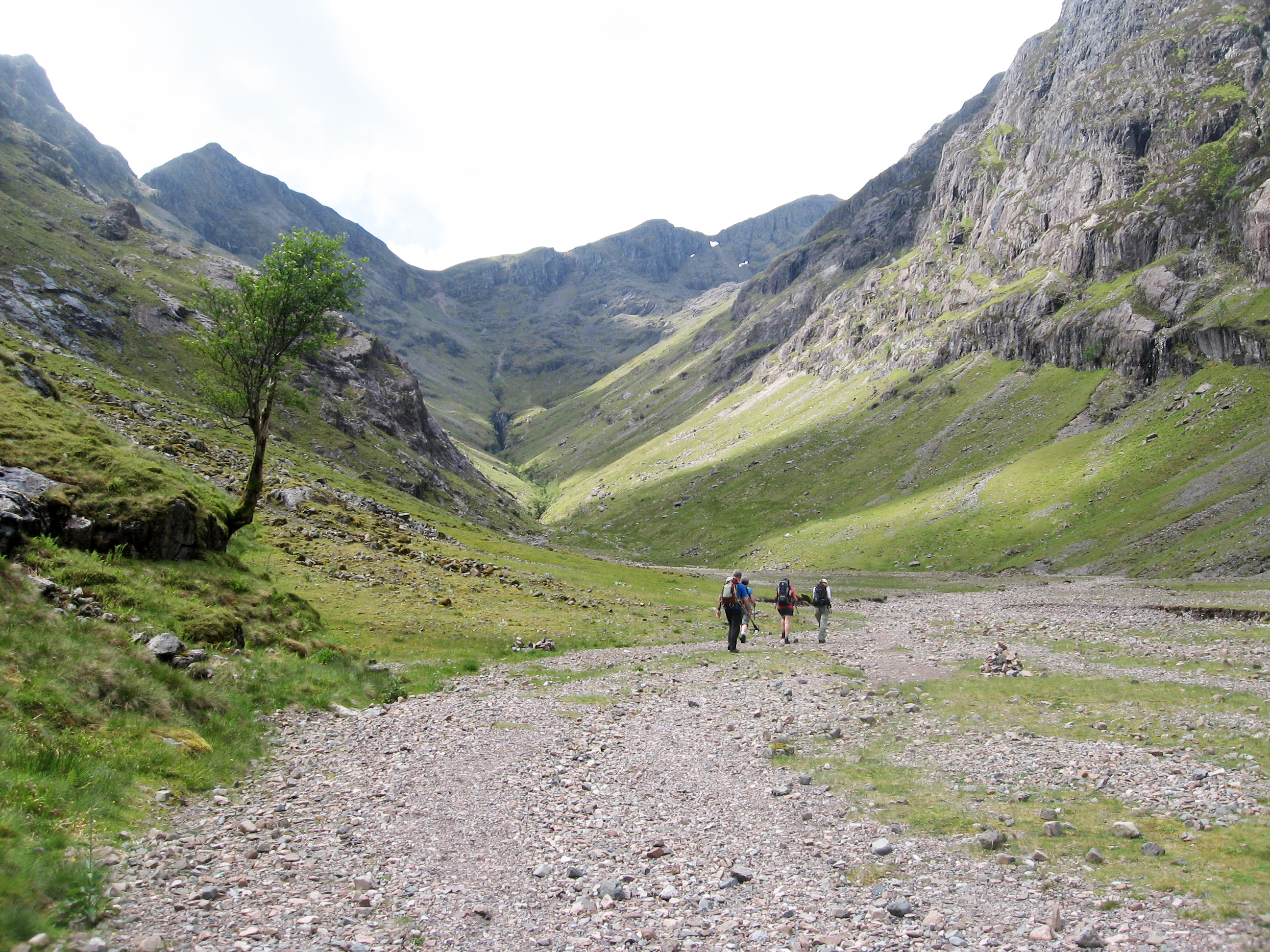
View up to the ridge access at Bealach Dearg, with the peak of Stob Coire Sgreamhach to the left of centre.

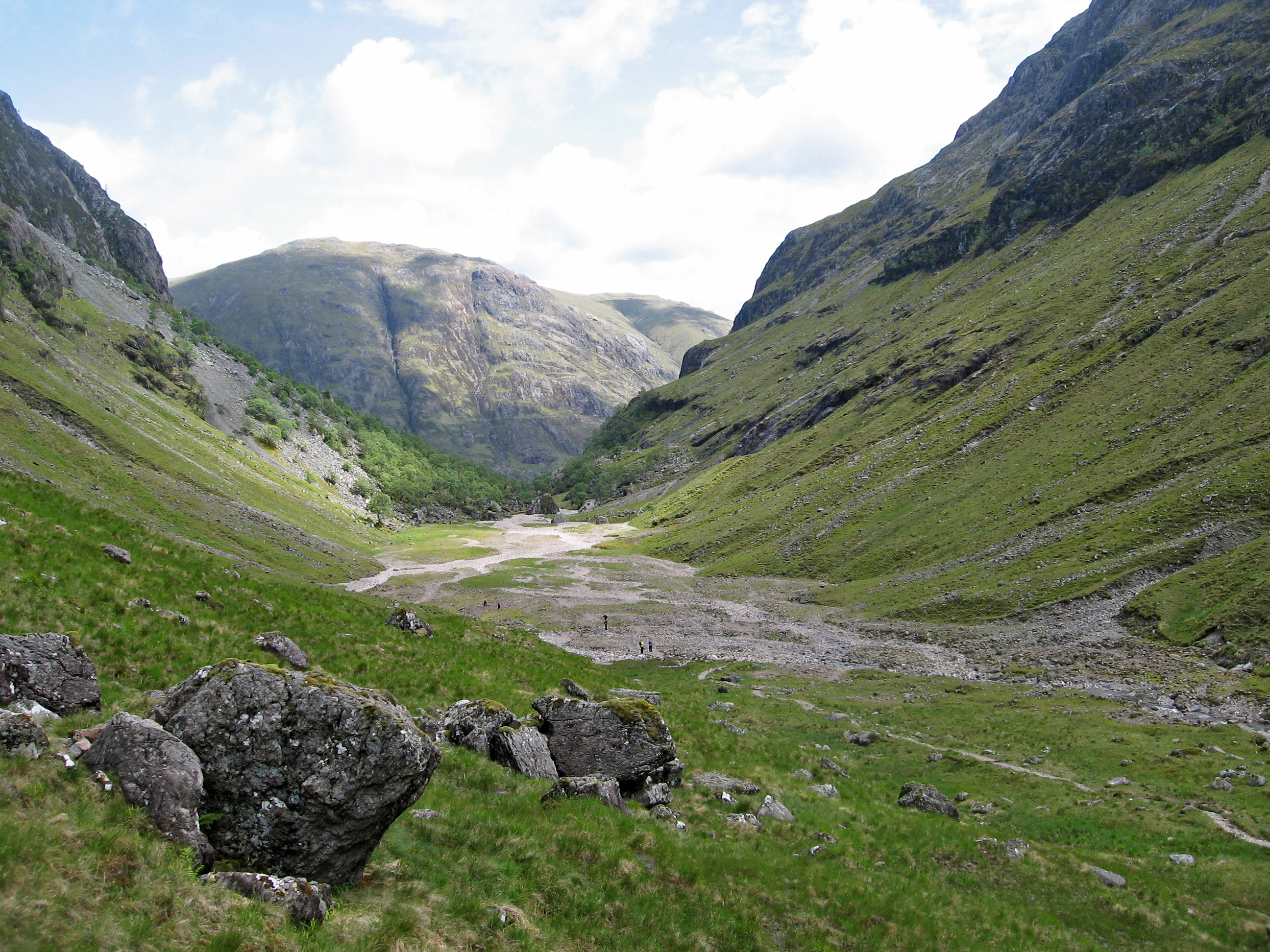
The flat valley floor, looking north to the narrow entrance, and beyond that the Aonach Eagach ridge on the other side of Glen Coe.

This corrie was formed, like Glen Coe, by the movement of glaciers. The principal glacier in the glen below was larger and heavier, and carved out a deeper trough than that of Coire Gabhail. When the glaciers melted a hanging valley was left, high above the glen. Debris from the glaciers left moraines in the mouths of the glens and corries, often resulting in a lake forming behind them. In time these waters found their way through the debris and the lake drained leaving a relatively flat-bottomed alluvial plain which now forms the floor of the corrie.

The name Coire Gabhail (Corrie of the Bounty, or The Hollow of Capture) refers to former times when the corrie was used by members of Clan Macdonald to hide cattle and other livestock, whether their own or stolen from others. Like other clans in the area, cattle were the mainstay of their economy, both herding and raiding: young men boastfully sang of getting cows from the Mearns. The wide flat glen is well suited for this purpose since from Glen Coe it appears to be a normal v-shaped glen approached only by a steep narrow gorge.

The Macdonalds commonly had feuds with Clan Campbell. This culminated tragically in the 1692 massacre of Glencoe when Government soldiers turned on Macdonald clansfolk who fled in a winter blizzard, and a number made their way up to Coire Gabhail while their houses were burned. Those that survived the night then left Glen Coe, fearing the return of the soldiers.

== Access ==
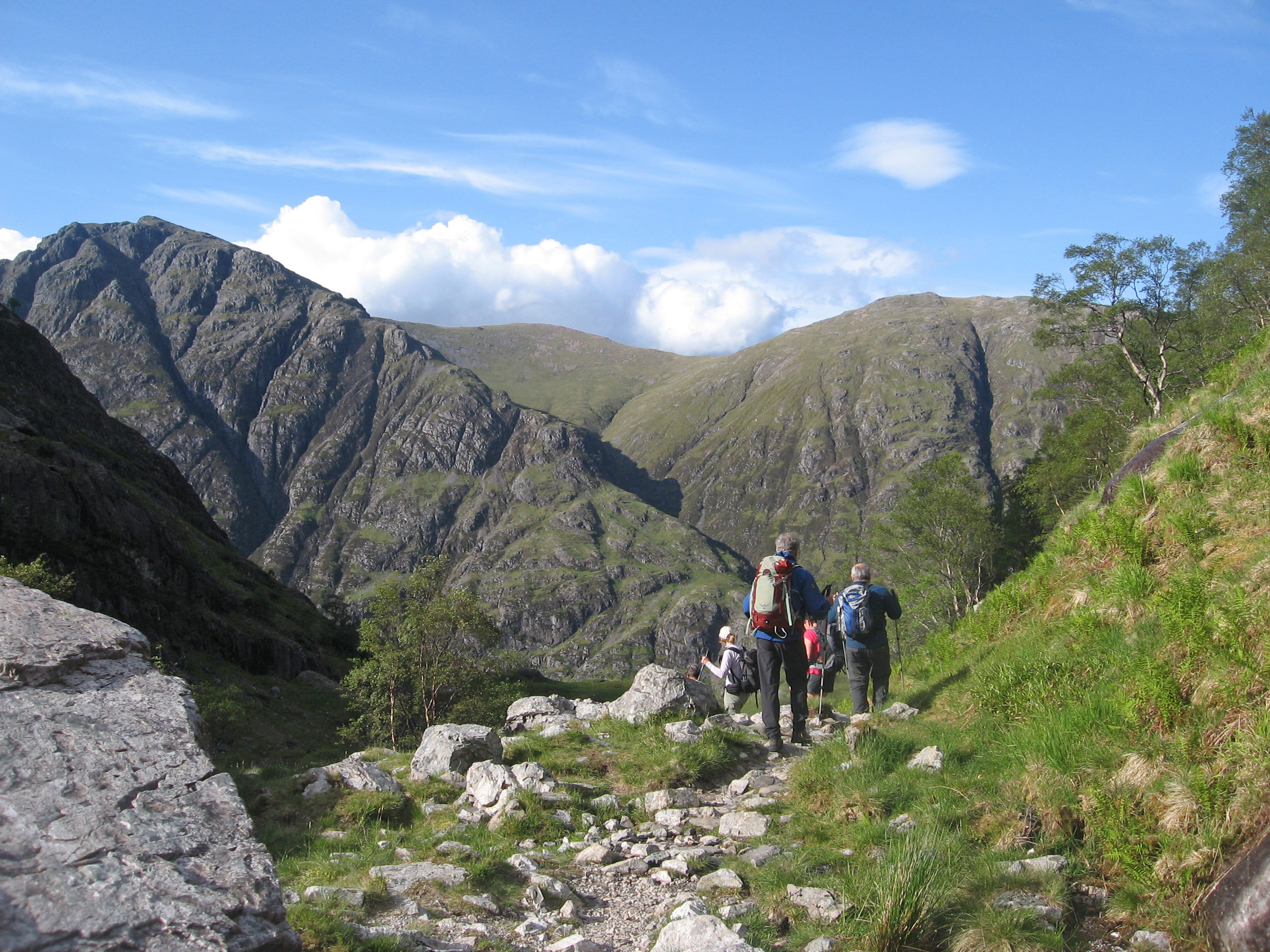
At the corrie entrance, the top of the path beside the ravine.

The path from Glen Coe up beside the gorge into Coire Gabhail is a popular short walk (around 3 kilometres (1.9 mi) each way, ascent 230 metres (750 ft)), the path is rough in places involving use of hands on rock for balance or as a step-up, and crossing a river by stepping stones. A car park on the south side of the A82 road, a short distance west of Allt-na-reigh cottage, has a path heading down eastwards to a footbridge across the River Coe. From here, rough stone steps lead up beside the ravine, with views of waterfalls. The top of the path leads out onto the shoulder formed by the ancient landslip, with views and a rough path to the flat corrie floor.

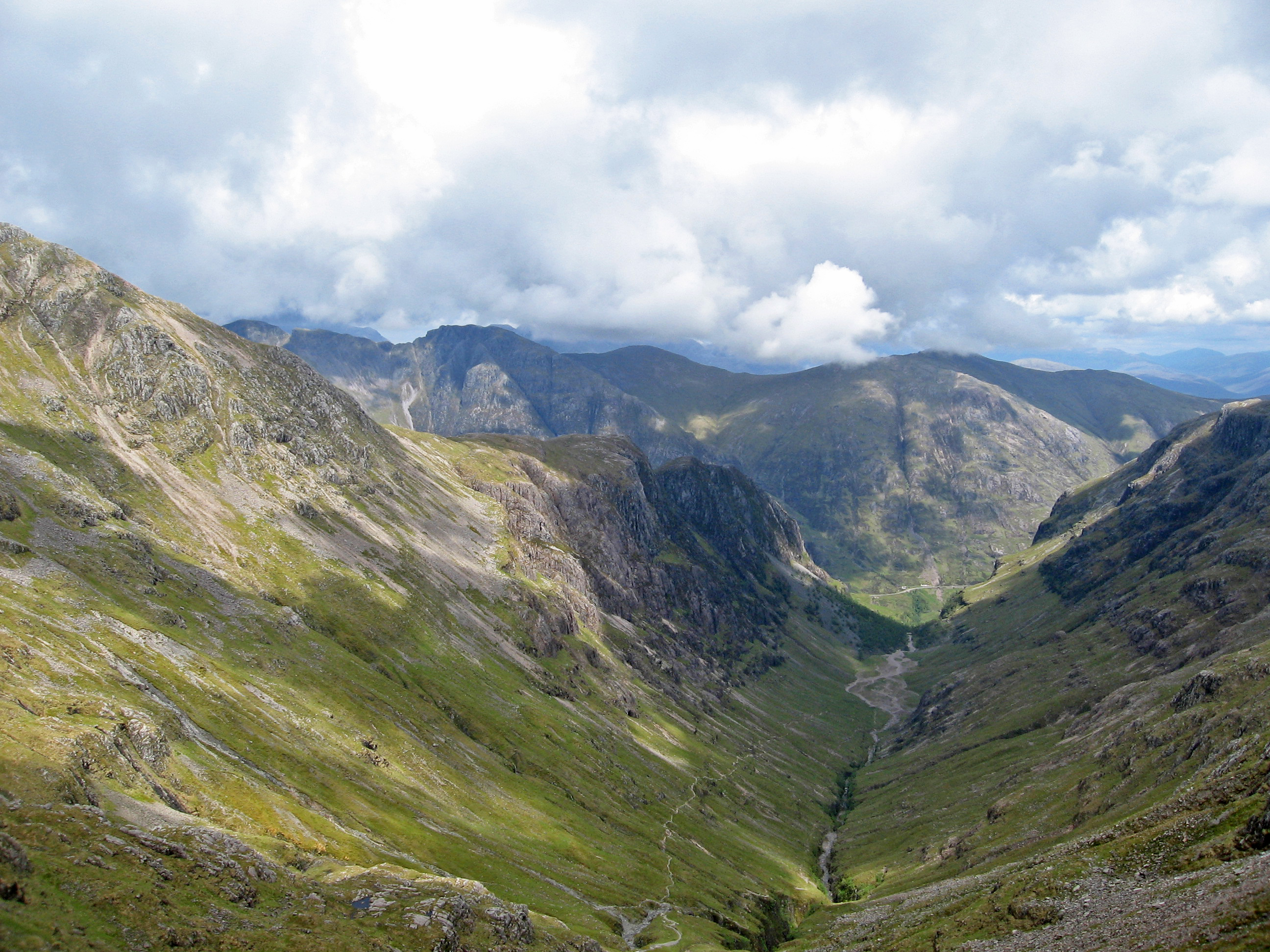
Seen from high up near the ridge, the hill path snakes down to the corrie floor. On the other side of Glen Coe, the A82 road passing Allt-na-reigh cottage is visible below the slopes of Am Bodach.

This forms a common access route for hill walkers tackling the Stob Coire Sgreamhach and Bidean nam Bian Munros. A rough steep path climbs from the flat corrie bottom traversing the side of Gearr Aonach and gaining height to reach Bealach Dearg. Here rubbly steep rocks and a narrow chute of earthy red scree lead up onto the ridge, with an option of steep broken rocks to the left. Descent is disconcerting, and an alternative is to continue a traverse of the range, returning down by Coire nan Lochan.
