= Glen Etive =

Glen in the Highlands of Scotland

Coordinates: 56°36′4″N 5°0′21″W

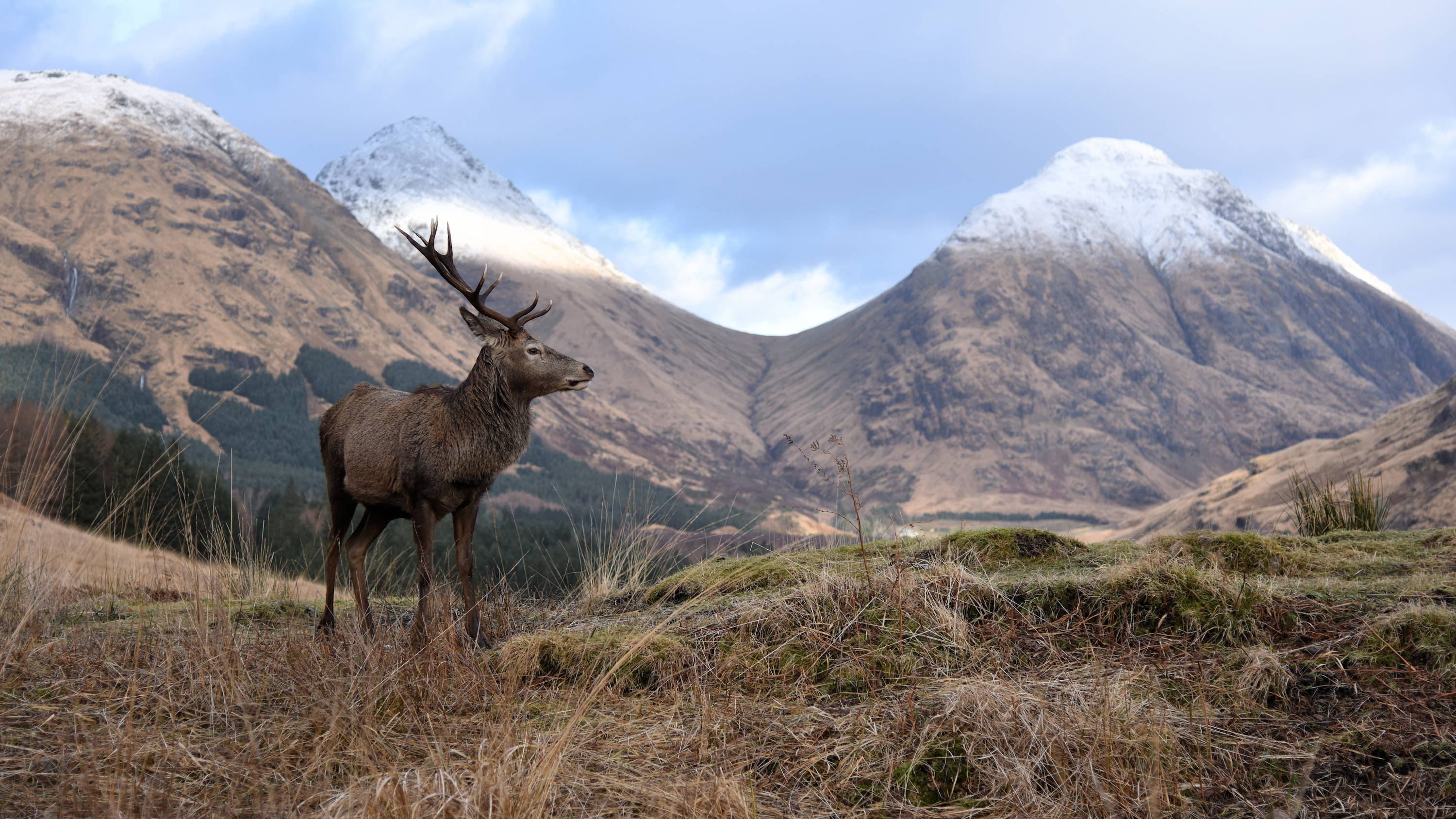
A Red Deer stag posing in Glen Etive

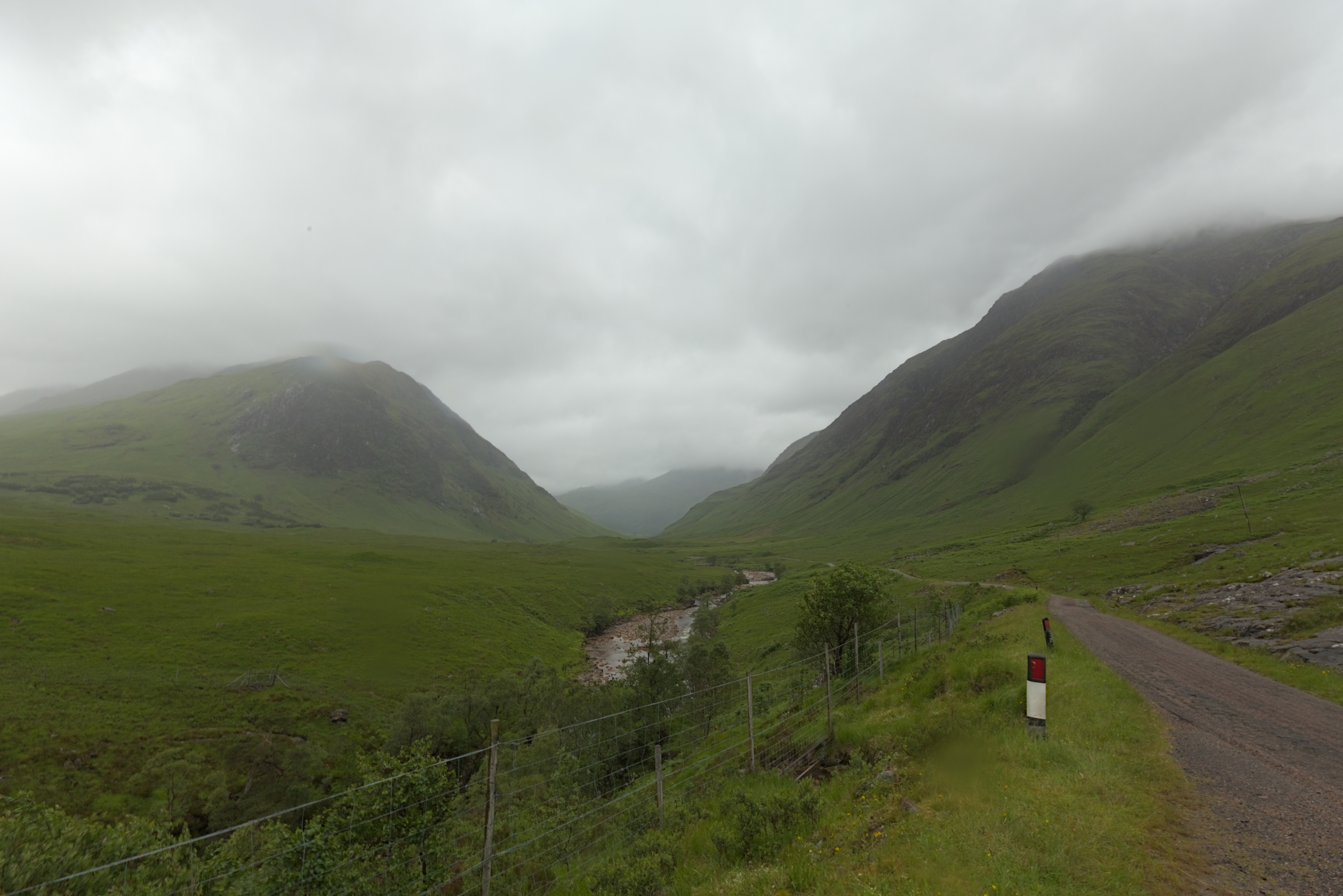
The narrow road that runs through Glen Etive, pictured in 2013

Glen Etive (Scottish Gaelic: Gleann Èite) is a glen in the Scottish Highlands. The River Etive (Scottish Gaelic: Abhainn Èite) rises on the peaks surrounding Rannoch Moor, with several tributary streams coming together at the Kings House Hotel, at the head of Glen Coe. From the Kings House, the Etive flows for about 18 kilometres (11 miles), reaching Loch Etive, a sea loch.

At the north end of Glen Etive lie the two mountains known as the "Herdsmen of Etive": Buachaille Etive Mòr and Buachaille Etive Beag. Other peaks accessible from the Glen include Ben Starav, located near the head of Loch Etive, and Beinn Fhionnlaidh on the northern side of the glen. The scenic beauty of the glen has led to its inclusion the Ben Nevis and Glen Coe National Scenic Area, one of 40 such areas in Scotland.

A narrow road from the Kings House Hotel runs down the glen, serving several houses and farms, from which stags can be seen. The area is home to a herd of Scottish red deer that have become accustomed to the presence of humans.

The River Etive is one of Scotland's most popular and challenging white water kayaking runs. It provides a multitude of solid Grade 4(5) rapids with a variety of falls and pool drops.

== Mythology ==
In the Ulster Cycle of Irish mythology, the tragic heroine Deirdre and her love Naoise founded Glen Etive after fleeing Ulster.

The Fachen is also known as the Dwarf of Glen Etive.

== Movie location ==
Glen Etive has been used as the backdrop to many movies, among them Braveheart, Harry Potter and the Order of the Phoenix and Skyfall. The resulting influx of visitors has led to concerns about the spoilage of the glen through littering and fly-tipping.
