= Corrieyairack Pass =

Pass in the Scottish Highlands

Coordinates: 57.05119°N 4.61136°W

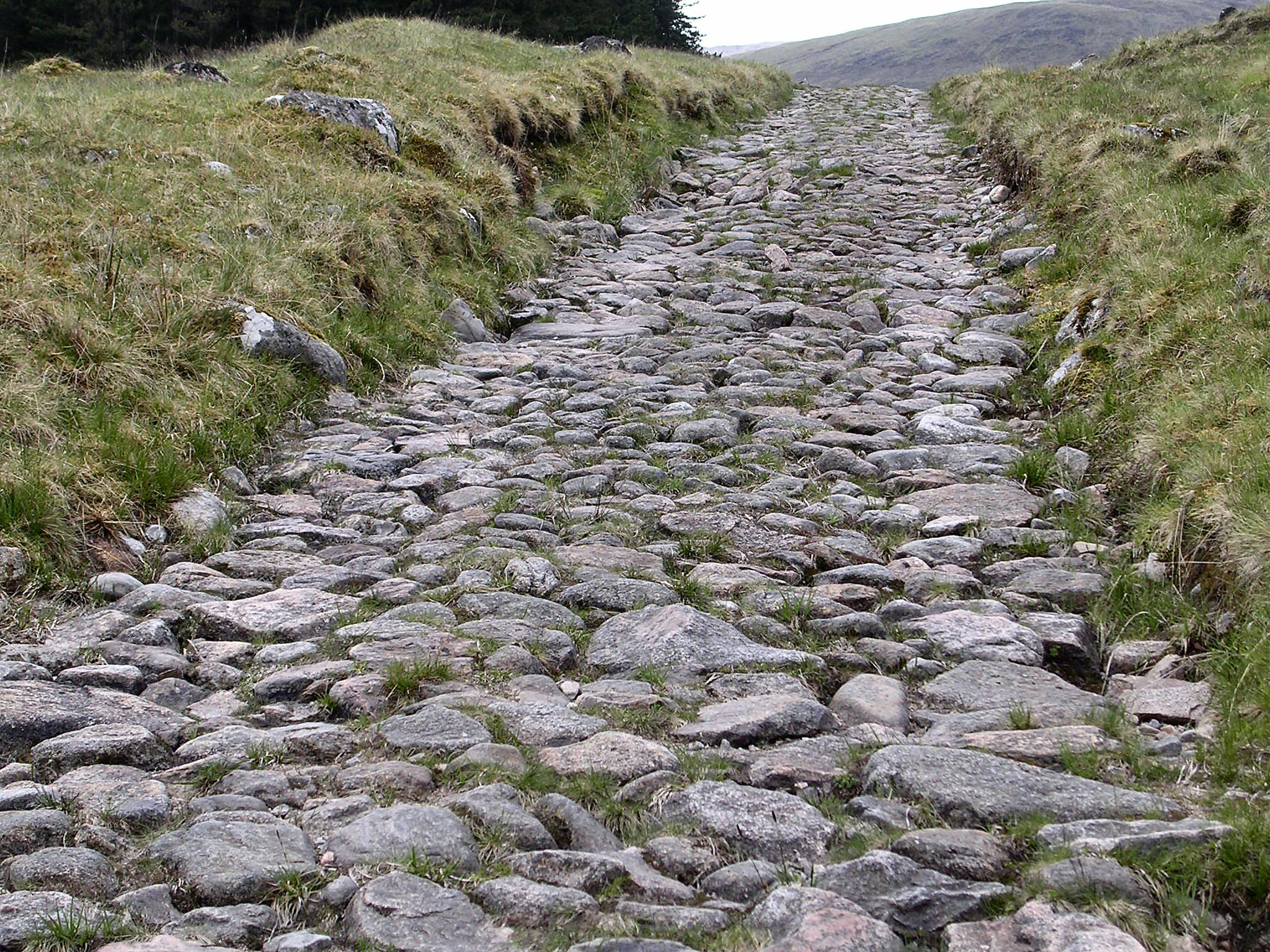
A well-preserved section of General Wade's Military Road near Melgarve, looking west up towards the Corrieyairack Pass

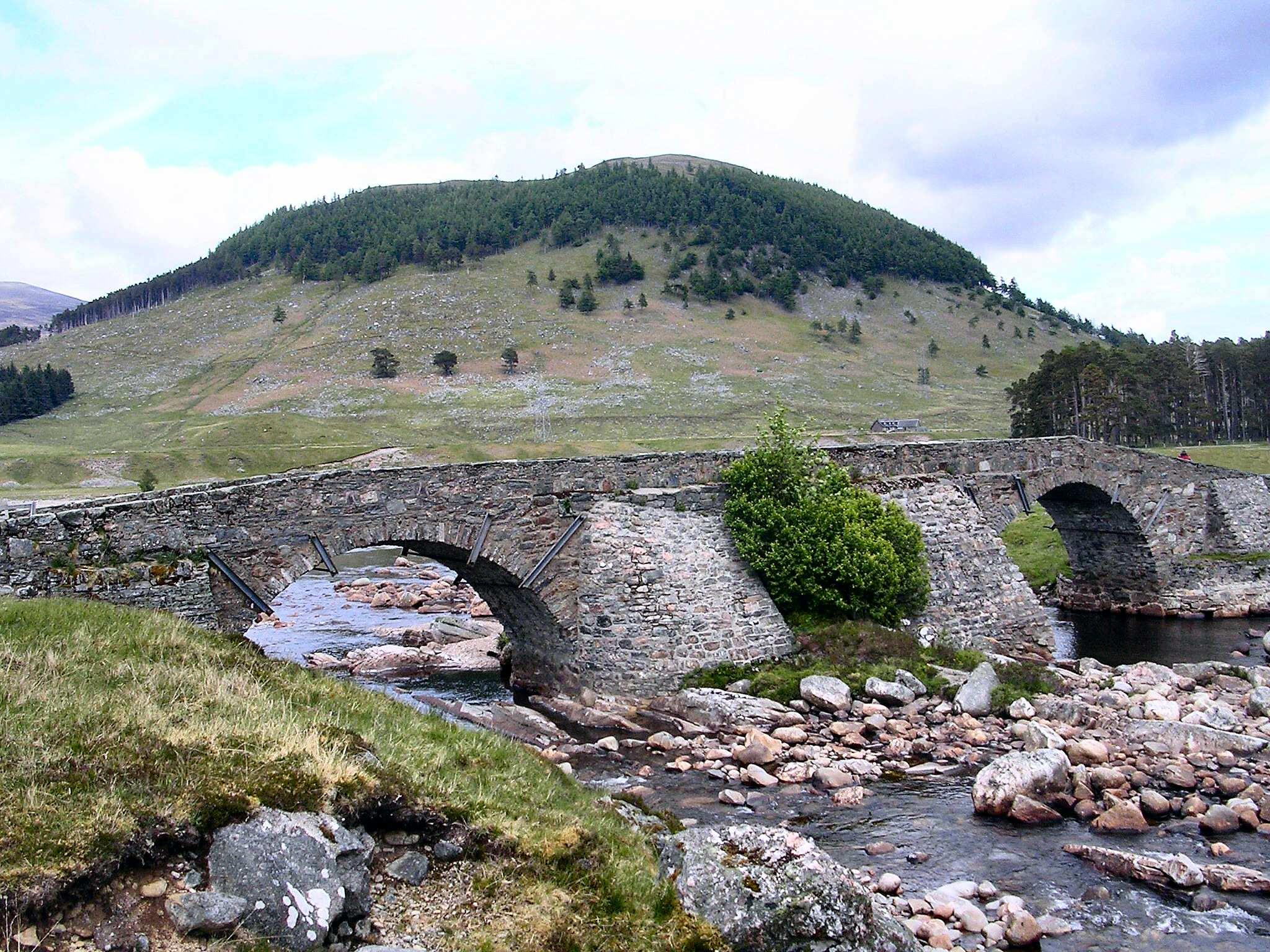
Garva Bridge over River Spey on General Wade's military road to Corrieyairack Pass and Fort Augustus, looking northeast. The Pass is to the west.

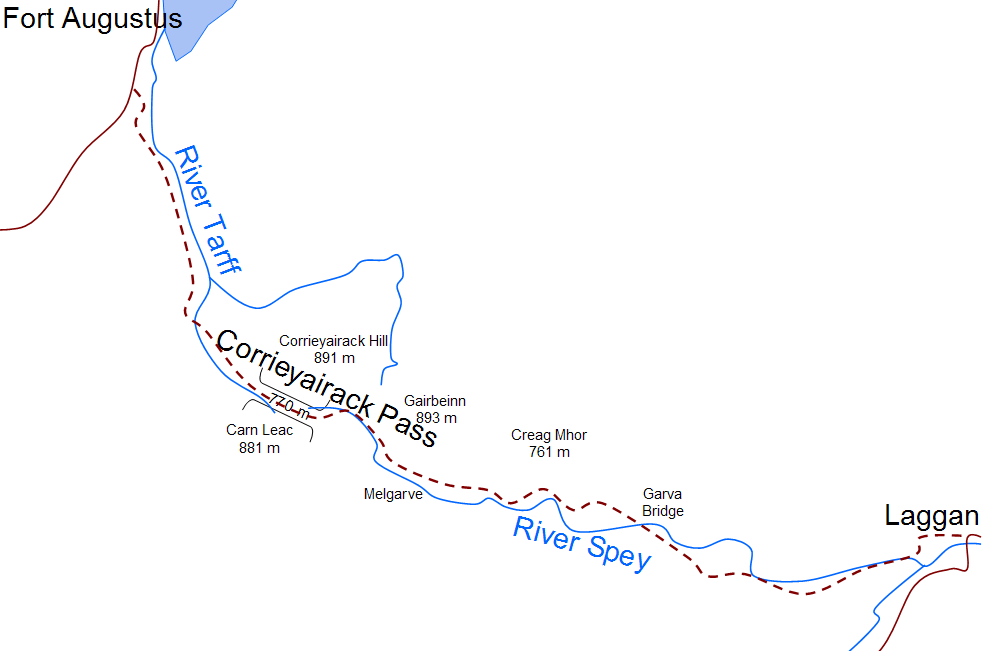
Corrieyairack Pass lies between Fort Augustus and Laggan in the Scottish highlands.

The Corrieyairack Pass (Scottish Gaelic – Màm Choire Ghearraig) is a 770 m (2526 ft) high pass in the Scottish Highlands at grid reference NN417986. It is notable for the presence of one of General Wade's military roads, built at the time of the Jacobite risings in the eighteenth century.

== Military road ==
This pass would be relatively obscure were it not for General Wade's military road built over it in 1731, between Fort Augustus in the Great Glen to the north and Melgarve in Strath Spey in the south. This path almost became the site of a major battle in the Jacobite rising of 1745, when Prince Charles Edward Stuart encamped at the height of the pass, and the Government commander approached from the south to quell the rebellion. The Government forces retreated due to the strongly entrenched position of the Jacobite Forces.

== The pass today ==
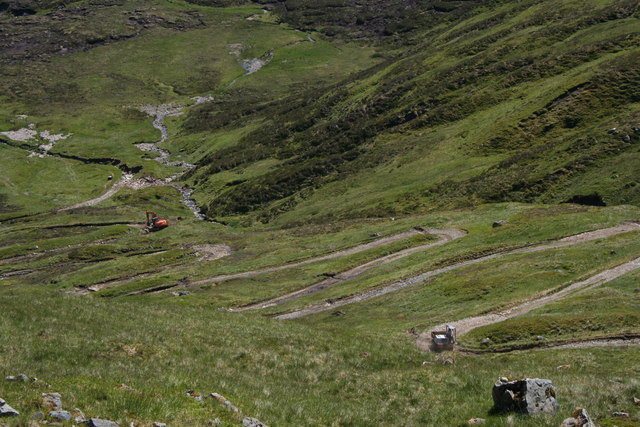
Zig-zags near the top of the pass

The Highland Council states that the Corrieyairack Pass is not maintained as a public road, and is not suitable for use as one, so it advises against using motor vehicles on the pass. The road surface is made of stone, though it is now very eroded and damaged, and in many places the original paving has been lost. It is now used primarily by hikers and mountain bikers, as well as access for workers maintaining the adjacent electricity pylon line.

The military road is designated a Scheduled Ancient Monument with separate listings for each section, these being from south-east to north-west:

- Melgarve to Allt Ruadh 4 km (2.5 mi)
- Allt Ruadh to watershed 1.5 km (0.9 mi)
- watershed to Allt Lagan a'Bhainne 3.5 km (2.2 mi)
- Allt Lagan a'Bhainne to Black Burn 2.5 km (1.6 mi)
- Black Burn to Connachie Burn 3.5 km (2.2 mi)
- Connachie Burn to Culachy 1 km (0.6 mi)
