= Military roads of Scotland =

Road network created in the wake of the Jacobite rebellions

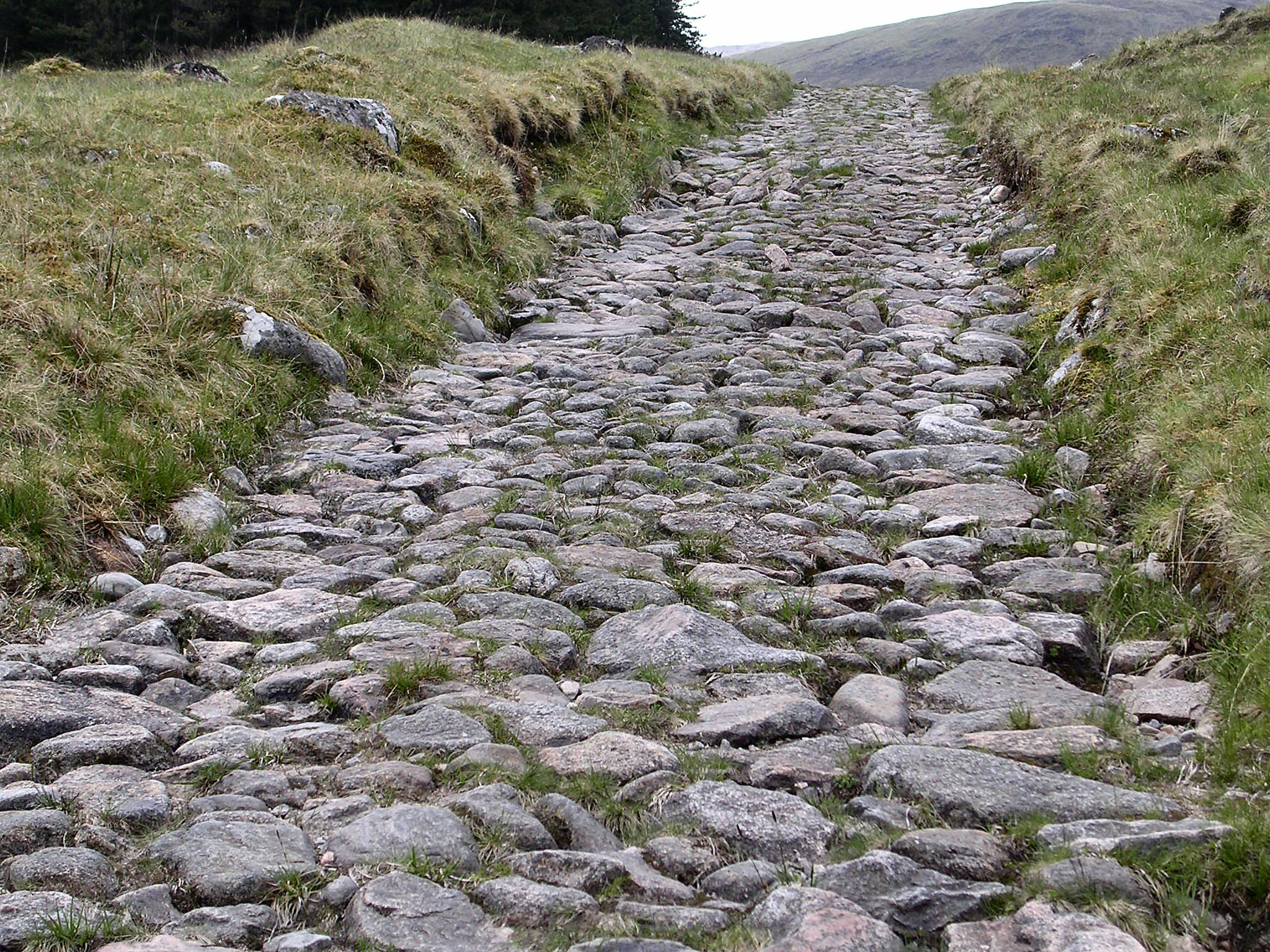
A well-preserved section of General Wade's Military Road near Melgarve, leading to the Corrieyairack Pass

A network of military roads, sometimes called General Wade's Military Roads, was constructed in the Scottish Highlands during the middle part of the 18th century in the wake of the Jacobite rebellion of 1715.

The roads were constructed to link the Central Lowlands with a series of fortified barracks located strategically across the Highlands. Their purpose, much like the network of roads constructed by the Romans more than 1,500 years earlier, was to suppress and exert control over the local population. The engineered roads of the Roman period did not extend into the Highlands, which was where these later roads were constructed.

The first four of these roads were constructed in the 1720s and 1730s under the direction of General George Wade (an Anglo-Irishman) and are commonly referred to as General Wade’s Military Roads or simply as Wade’s Roads.

The network was subsequently expanded considerably under the direction of Major William Caulfeild, although his name is now largely forgotten and each of the roads that he had put in place are referred to, on Ordnance Survey mapping for example, simply as "Old Military Road". A further road was constructed by Caulfeild in southwest Scotland in the 1760s.

== Wade’s Roads ==
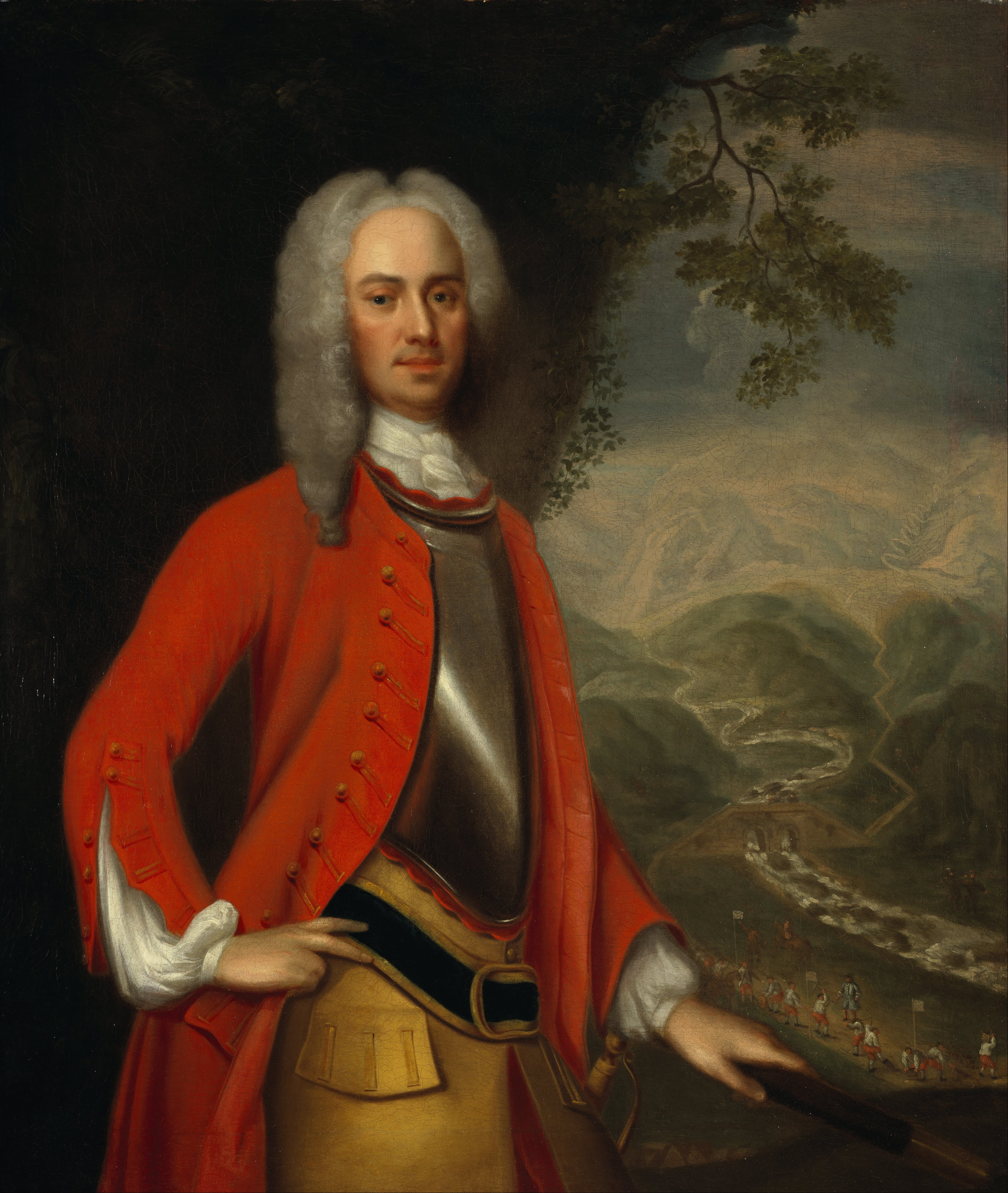
Field Marshal George Wade, painted about 1731

Wade's and Caulfeild's military roads

General Wade was sent to Scotland in July 1724. He reported back in December that "more than half of the 22,000 men capable of bearing arms in the Highlands and Islands were ready to create new troubles and rise in arms to favour the Pretender". In his report Wade pointed out that government troops would benefit from improved roads and river crossings to put down the rebels.

George I appointed Wade as Commander-in-chief, North Britain in 1725. The first of four roads whose building Wade would oversee, was under construction by the following year;

1. from Inverness to Fort William (along the south side of Loch Ness)
2. from Dunkeld to Inverness via Pass of Drumochter
3. from Crieff to the existing road at Dalnacardoch by Aberfeldy and Tummel Bridge
4. from Dalwhinnie to Fort Augustus via Corrieyairack Pass (and a spur to Ruthven via Crubenbeg)

The roads were built by the military at an average cost of £90 per mile (£60/km). Their standard width was 16 feet (5 m) but shrinking to 10 feet (3 m) as required. Construction took place between April/May and October of each year, the winter months being too harsh for such labours. Work in the summer could be arduous too with uncertain weather and the presence of the ubiquitous midge. The construction parties consisted of one hundred men overseen by two corporals, two sergeants, two subalterns and a captain. They were generally also accompanied by a drummer. Wade engaged craftsmen with skills in masonry, carpentry, for example, to ensure that major structures such as bridges were built to a standard. Encampments were established at 10-mile (16-kilometre) intervals and the inns which developed became known as Kingshouses. Some of these continue to serve travellers today. The well-known Kingshouse on Rannoch Moor sits beside the route made by Wade's successor William Caulfeild.

=== Fort William to Inverness ===
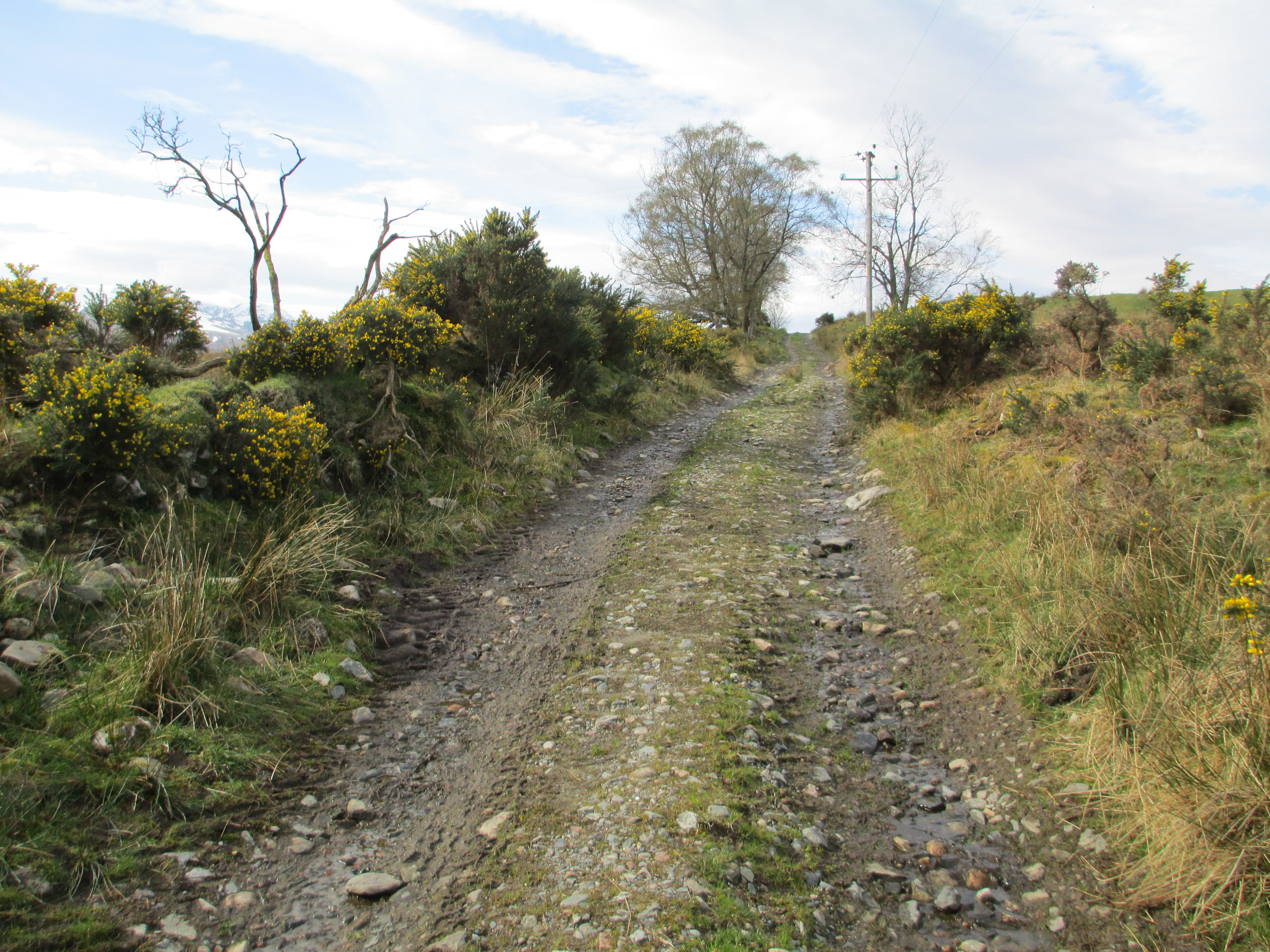
Near Spean Bridge

Three forts were constructed by the British government along the length of the Great Glen in the early 18th century. At its southwestern end was Fort William at the head of Loch Linnhe where the town of that name now stands. A second fort had been constructed in 1715 at the southern end of Loch Ness at Kilcumein. It was named Fort Augustus after Prince William Augustus, Duke of Cumberland. At its northeastern end, the original Fort George was constructed in Inverness - it was not until the destruction of that fort in the rebellion of 1746 that a replacement was constructed at Ardersier Point on the Moray Firth.

A route stretching the width of the Highlands from sea to sea was built by Wade during 1726 and 1727 to link the three forts. Before the completion of the northern section, and as a temporary measure, a galley operated on Loch Ness. It was withdrawn once the road was in place though it was later used in association with the construction of the Caledonian Canal.

The southern section takes a route eastwards from Fort Augustus along a line followed by the modern B862 road, crossing the Allt Doe, passing by Loch Tarff, entering Stratherrick and passing along the western shore of Loch Mhòr. The alignment of Wade's route to the northeast of Loch Duntelchaig is followed by minor roads today.

A new alignment of its northern section was constructed closer to the shores of Loch Ness in 1732. This route is followed by the modern B852 road between Inverness and Foyers and joins the earlier line near Whitebridge.

=== Dunkeld to Inverness ===
Built between 1728 and 1730 by Wade. A report from Wade in July 1728 refers to some 300 men working on the route, of which 15 miles (24 km) had by then been completed.

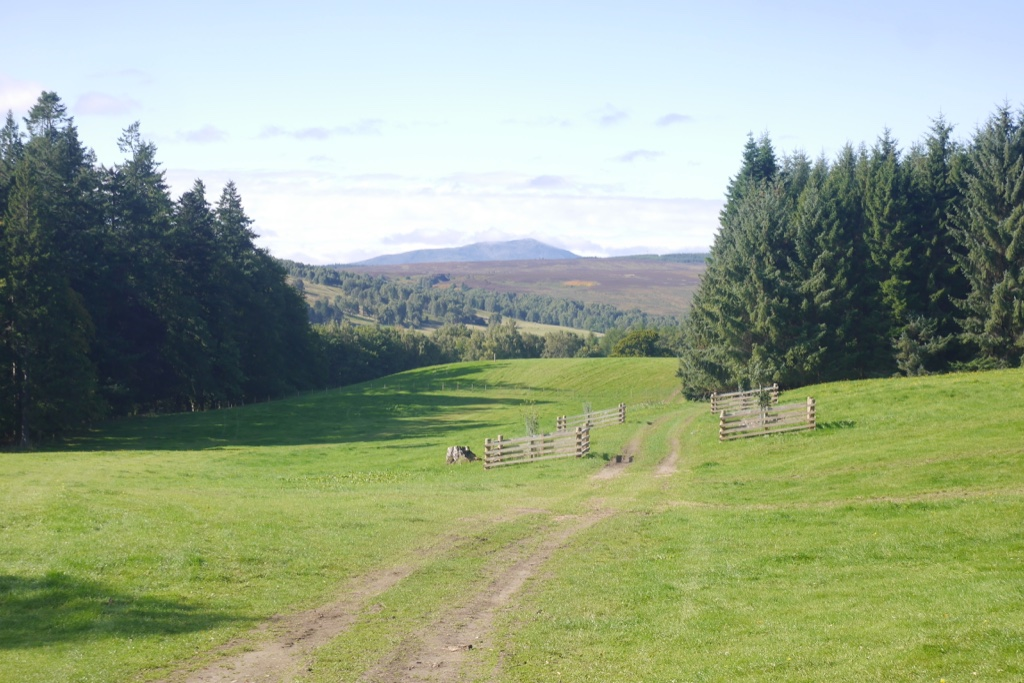
Blair Atholl

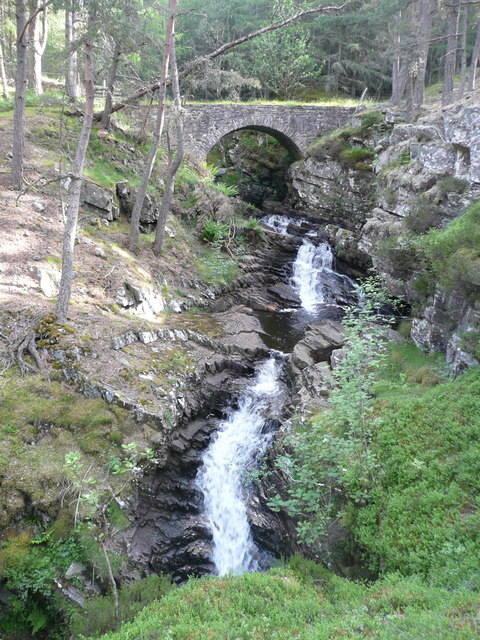
Drochaid na h-Uinneige near Struan, Perthshire

The route, followed by a minor road (formerly the A9 before the main road was diverted further west), ran west out of Dunkeld to the King's Pass and then turned north up the eastern side of Strathtay. It continued north through Ballinluig to Pitlochry before squeezing through the Pass of Killiecrankie into Glen Garry. It crossed the River Tilt at the Old Bridge of Tilt to the north of Blair Atholl. Parts of the route are still intact: past Dalnacardoch to the Pass of Drumochter and Dalwhinnie; though other parts have been obliterated by the construction of the modern A9. From Glen Truim the route ran to the east of the modern road via Glen Fernisdale, Phones and a crossing of the Milton Burn at Drochaid Tigh na Mile (now a ford) en route to the barracks at Ruthven near Kingussie.

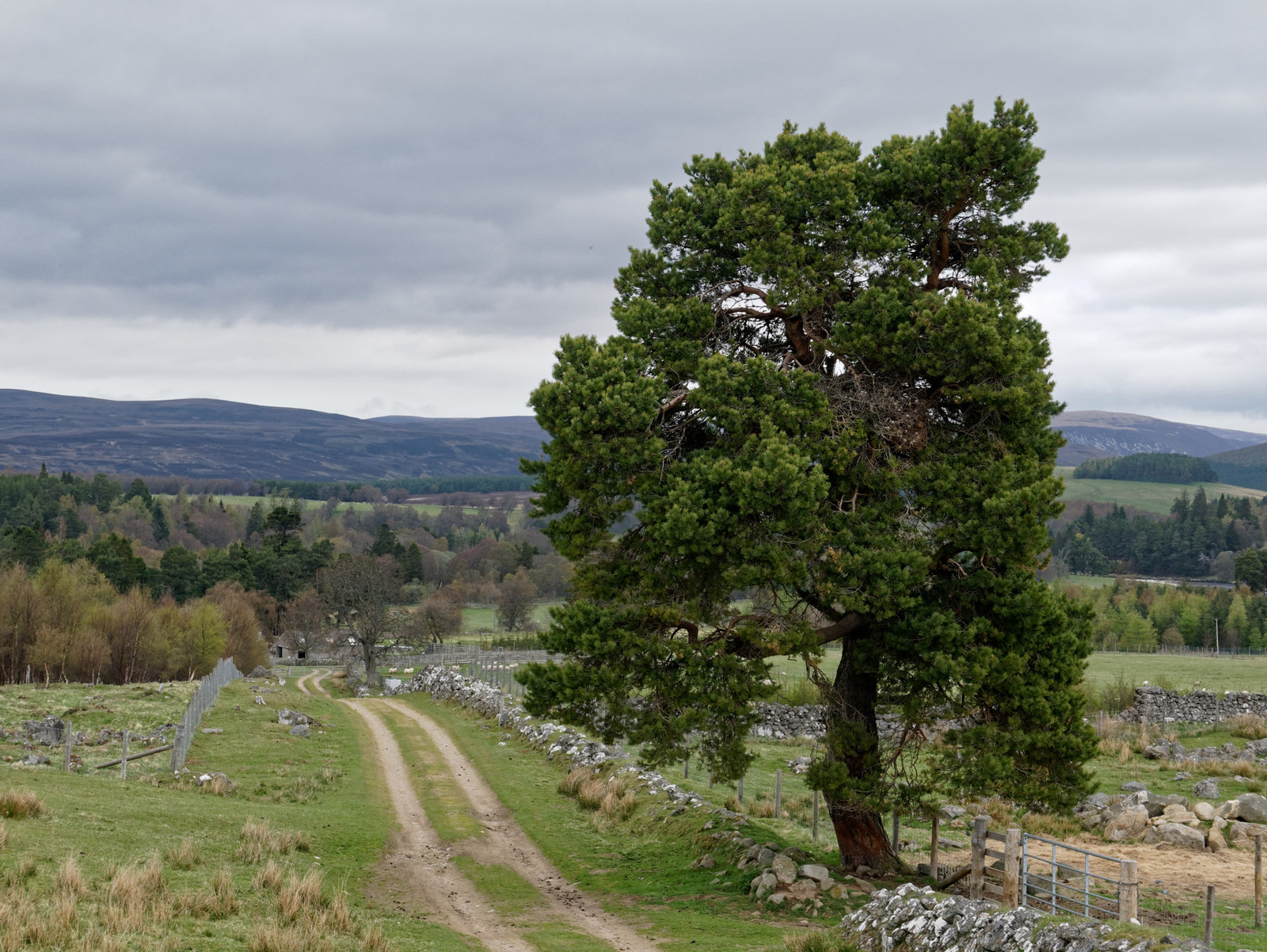
Near Tomatin

After crossing the River Spey the road ran along the western side of Strathspey via Kincraig, Alvie and Aviemore to Kinveachy. Here it set out northwestwards, away from the modern roads, to cross the River Dulnain by means of the high stone arch of Sluggan Bridge - a crossing now used by the National Cycle Network. Wade took the road through the pass at The Slochd just as the modern road does, and crossed the River Findhorn at Raigbeg. He chose to cross the River Nairn at Bridge of Faillie before running the road a last few miles over Drummossie Muir to the barracks at Fort George, Inverness.

=== Crieff to Dalnarcardoch ===
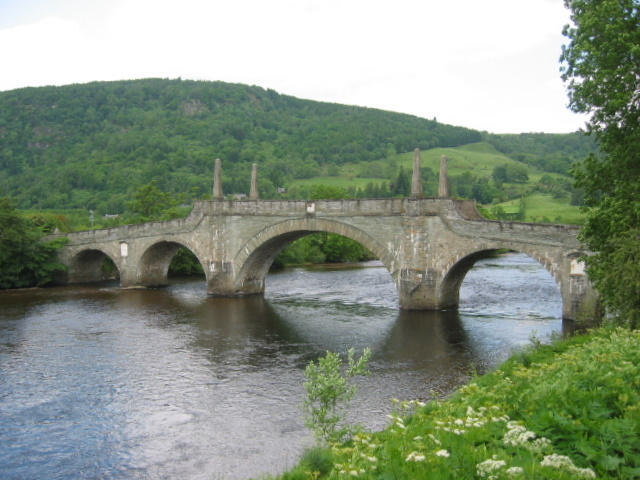
Tay Bridge, Aberfeldy

This road was built in 1730 by Wade. The bridge spanning the River Tay at Aberfeldy and designed by William Adam, proved to be the single most expensive structure on the whole network, exceeding £4000 on its completion in 1734 some years after the remainder of the road.

The route leaves Crieff heading northeast across Crieff Golf Club and turns north at Gilmerton heading towards the Sma' Glen. Its line is approximated by the A822 road; their routes coincide only in small part. It crosses the River Almond at Newton Bridge and runs north to Amulree where it crosses the River Braan. The route initially takes a more westerly course than the modern A826 road through Glen Cochill before joining and leaving the modern route repeatedly then descending to its crossing of the Tay at Aberfeldy.

From Aberfeldy the route turned west along Strath Tay and then northwest beside the River Lyon before breaking northwards beside the Keltney Burn and Glen Goulandie heading for a crossing of the River Tummel at Tummel Bridge - a route approximated by the modern B846 road. The road ran northwest from the bridge and around Drumcroy Hill to the remote hamlet of Trinafour and a crossing of the Errochty Water. The final section ran north from here to join the Dunkeld to Inverness route at Dalnacardoch.

=== Dalwhinnie and Ruthven to Fort Augustus ===
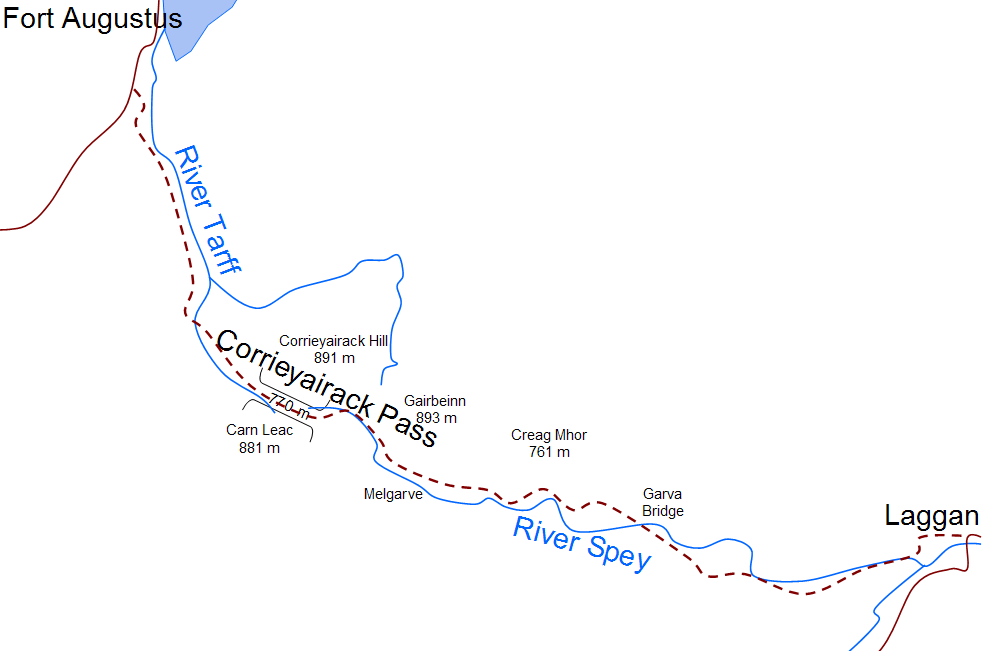
The old military road between Fort Augustus and Laggan crosses the Corrieyairack Pass.

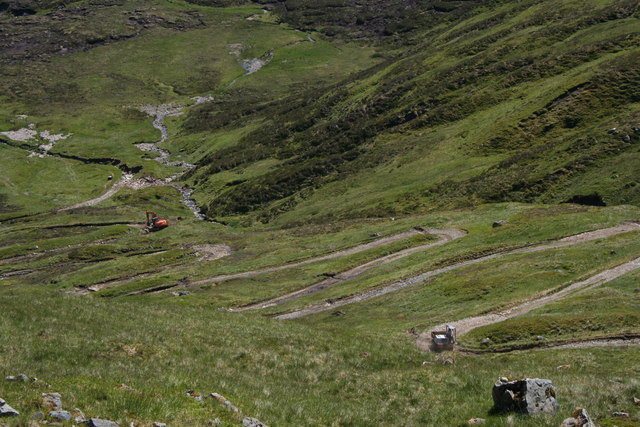
Zig-zags on Corrieyairck Pass

This road whose most celebrated section runs over the Corrieyairack Pass was built in 1731 by Wade. The initial part of the route which runs north from Dalwhinnie consists of numerous straight sections; its many sharp bends contribute to the reputation of the modern A889 road which follows it, as one of the most dangerous in Scotland. The connecting route from Ruthven ran west from the barracks through the upper part of Strathspey initially south of the river but then crossing it at Garva Bridge. Taking a rising line out of the valley of the Spey, and to the east of the Allt Yairack burn, it entered the bowl of Corrie Yairack and exited it by means of a series of tight zig-zags and over the exposed summit of the pass which lies at 750m above sea level. The route then drops northwestwards then north, remaining high above the deeply incised Glen Tarff before a final descent into the Great Glen. Ironically this road may have served the Jacobite forces more effectively than government troops, since during the 1745 rebellion after Prince Charles Edward Stuart raised his standard at Glenfinnan he used it to move fairly rapidly to Perth and the Lowlands.

== Caulfeild’s Roads ==
Wade himself retired in 1747 but not before his successor, Major William Caulfeild had been appointed to assist him as Inspector of Roads in 1732. Like Wade, Caulfeild was of Irish birth. He continued in the role until his death in 1767. It is Caulfeild who is credited with the lines:

Had you seen these roads before they were made
You would lift up your hands and bless General Wade

=== Tyndrum to Fort William ===
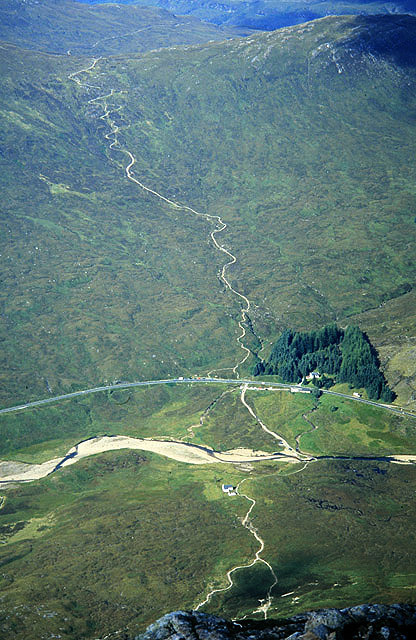
Devil's Staircase

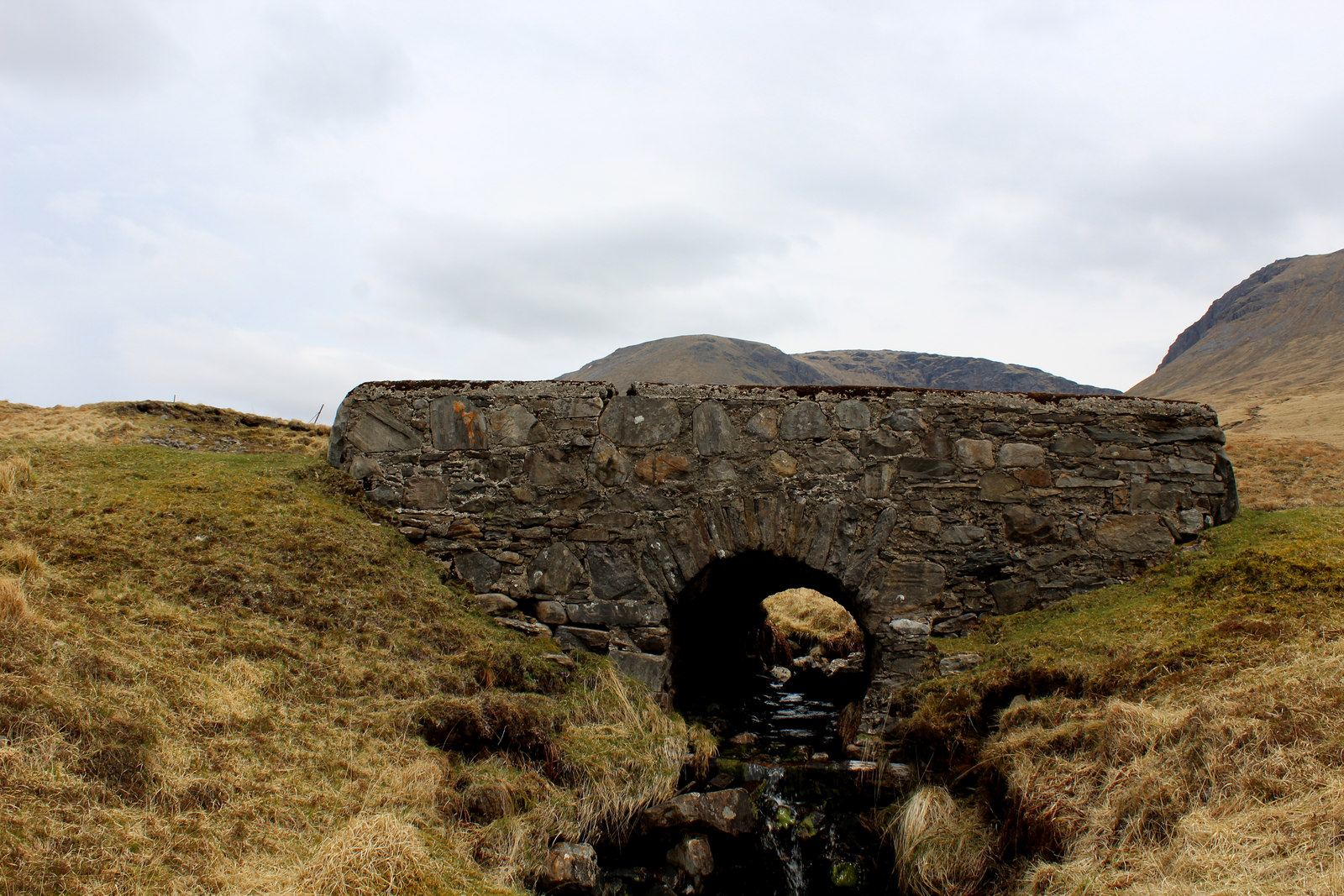
Glen Orchy

The road was built in 1752 from Rannoch Moor over the ridge to Loch Leven and necessitated the construction of a spectacular series of zig-zags known as the Devil’s Staircase. The Crianlarich to Fort William section was constructed between 1749 and 1750.

=== Rest and Be Thankful ===
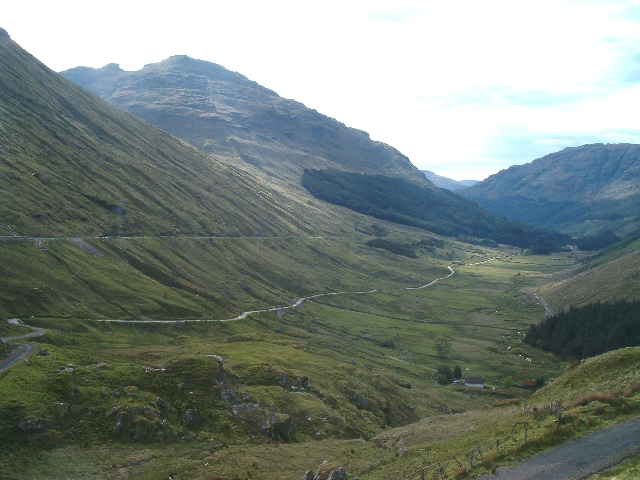
Glen Croe from Rest and Be Thankful, showing the military road in the valley

Construction of a road from Dumbarton to Inveraray was initiated under Caulfeild's command in 1743 but was then interrupted by the rebellion of 1745. Its 44 miles (71 km) which took it via the western side of Loch Lomond, Tarbet, Arrochar and Glen Croe were not then completed until 1749. A stone seat was erected at the summit of the 860-foot-high (260 m) pass at the head of Glen Croe bidding travellers to Rest and be thankful, hence the modern name. Subsequent maintenance was undertaken by the 93rd Regiment, the Sutherland Highlanders until in 1814 the route was handed over to the civilian authorities. William Wordsworth was later to write of this road:

Doubling and doubling with laborious walk,
Who, that has gained at length the wished-for height,
This brief simple way side call can slight,
And rests not thankful?

The route of this military road is now broadly followed by the A82 and A83 roads, partly on the original line, partly parallel to it. Where the old military road runs parallel to the new road it is sometimes used as a diversion route.

=== Tarbet to Crianlarich ===
The military road between Tarbet and Crianlarich was constructed between 1752 and 1754. Its route is approximated by a section of the modern A82 road. A section which diverges more widely from the modern route at the Crianlarich end is now followed by the West Highland Way.

=== Fort Augustus to Bernera ===
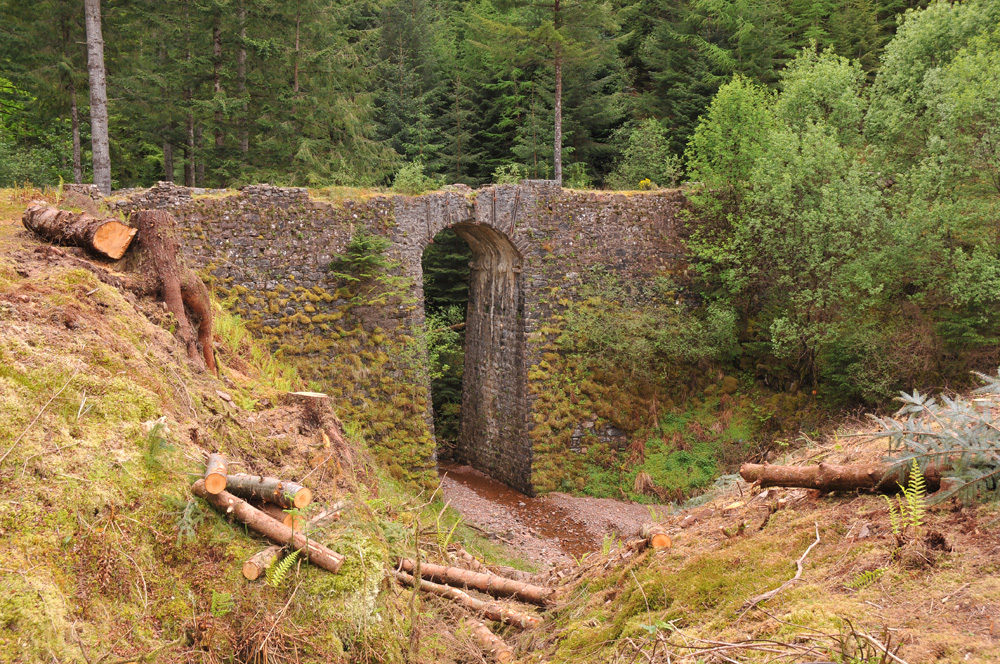
Bridge in Ratagan forest

The barracks at Bernera at Glenelg on the mainland shore opposite Skye were constructed in the early 1720s. Caulfeild engineered the road through the West Highlands from Fort Augustus to Bernera Barracks in 1755 but Telford’s commissioners remade it in the 1820s. It initially headed west through Inchnacardoch Forest climbing to a height of over 1,280 feet (390 m) before dropping into Glen Moriston. It appears to have crossed the River Moriston somewhere near the confluence of the River Doe with the Moriston, and then taken a route somewhat to the north of the present day A887 road and A87 road north of Loch Cluanie. The road descended Glen Shiel to Ratagan before rising over the Bealach Ratagain (Ratagan Pass) and into Glen More and thence to the barracks at its western, seaward end.

=== Blairgowrie to Inverness ===
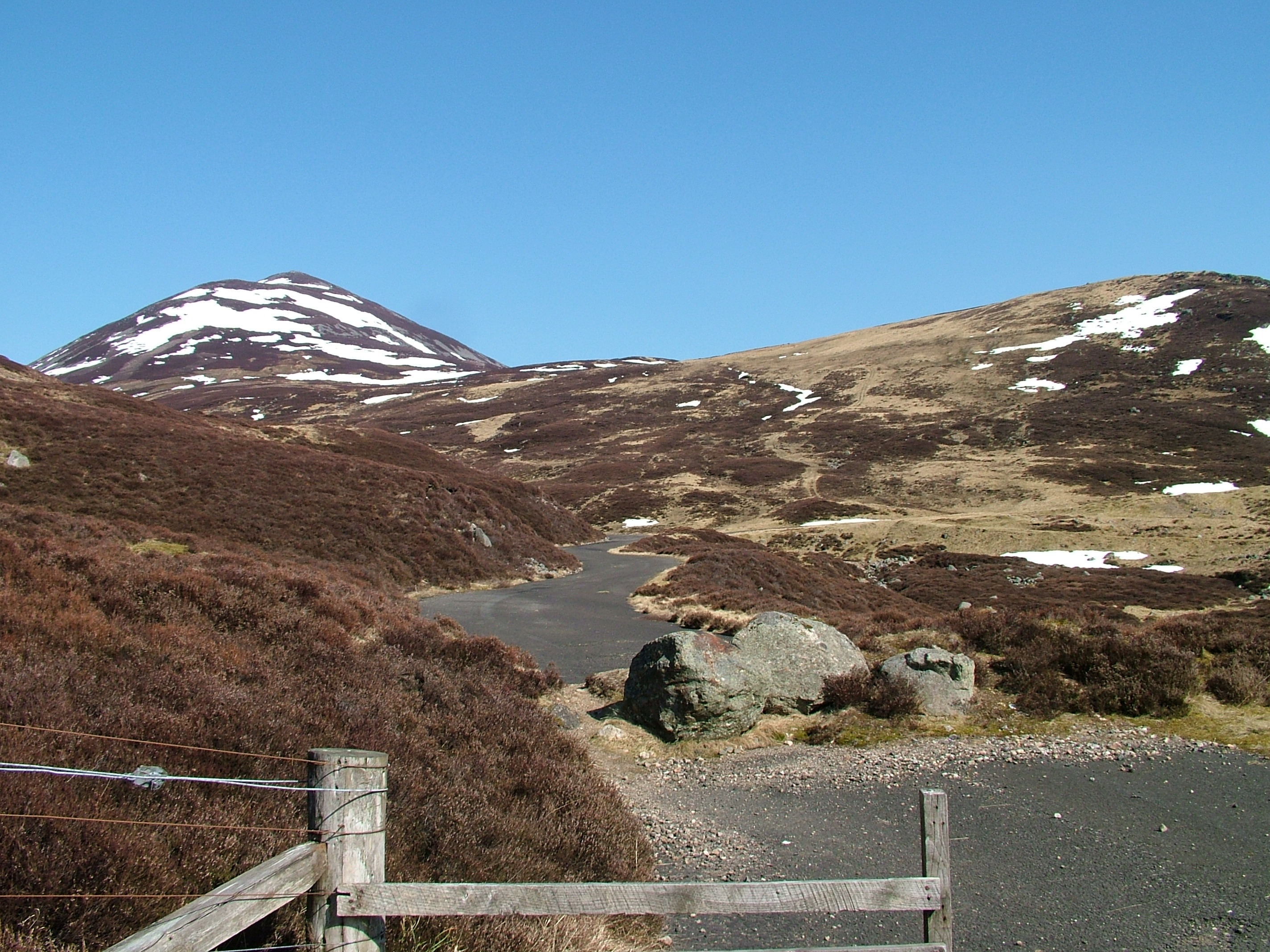
Near the Devil's Elbow

In connection with the construction of the new Fort George at Ardersier Point to the east of Inverness, Caulfeild was instructed to investigate a further, more easterly route between Inverness and Perth. A line from Blairgowrie to Braemar by way of Spittal of Glenshee was surveyed in 1748 and construction began in 1749. The continuation northwards via Corgarff, Grantown-on-Spey to Inverness did not begin until 1753. It would be the last of the major military roads to be built.

From Braemar a road was constructed eastwards down the Dee valley, crossing the river at Invercauld Bridge and continuing to the north bank to a point opposite Balmoral Castle. This section is followed by a part of the modern A93 road. It then ran northeastwards from the vicinity of Crathie on a line now followed, except in its southernmost part, by the B976 road. The road bridged the River Gairn at Gairnshiel and continued northwards over a high pass to Corgarff Castle in the upper part of the Don valley. The castle resulted from the government purchase in 1746 and subsequent fortification of one of the earl of Mar's hunting lodges. It was part of an attempt to reduce the incidence of cattle-rustling in the area.

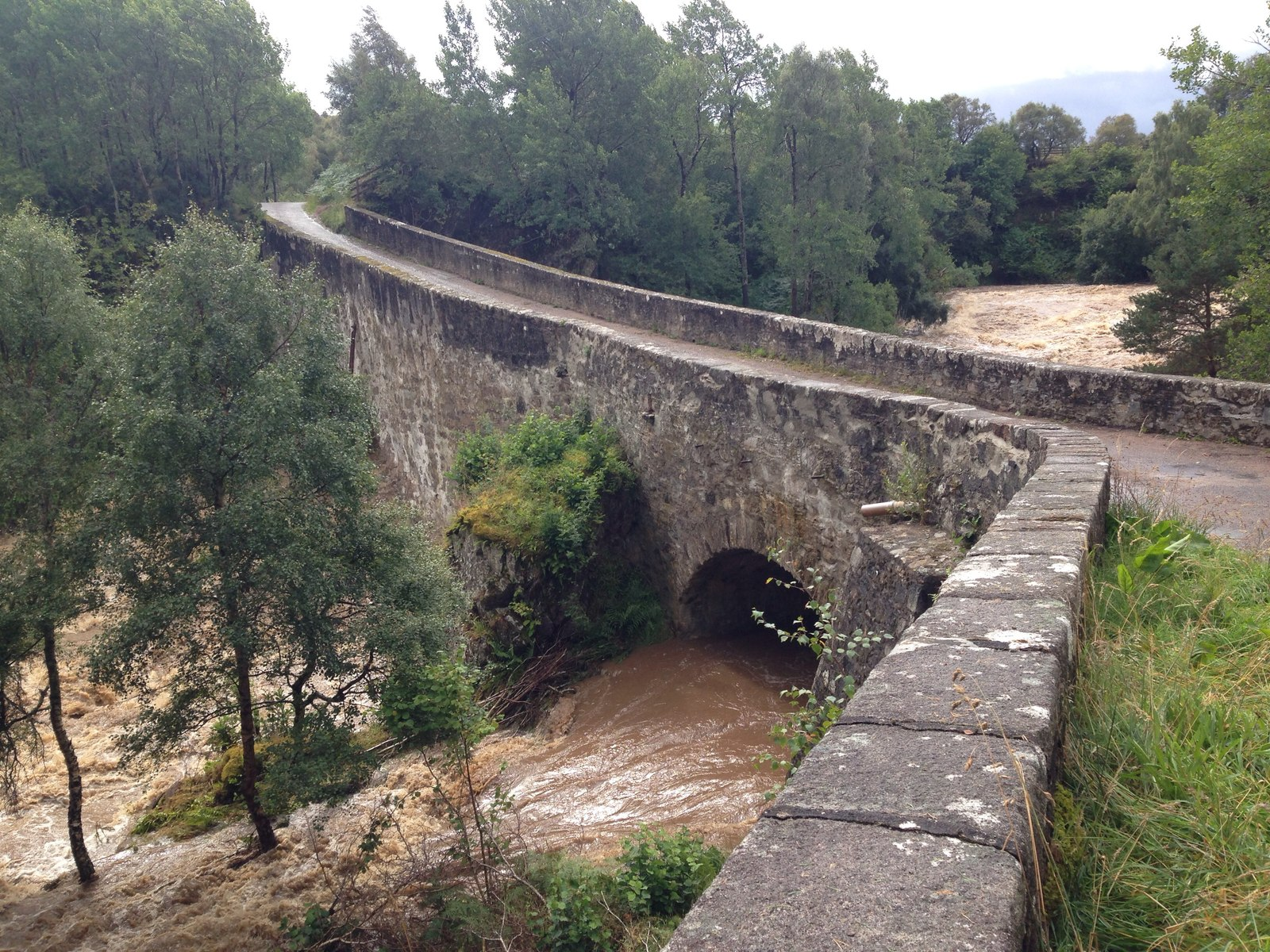
Dulsie Bridge over River Findhorn

The road ran northwest over the 2,114-foot-high (644 m) Lecht pass on an alignment largely followed by the modern A939 road to the village of Tomintoul. From Tomintoul the road was constructed westwards to Grantown-on-Spey and involved the bridging of two significant watercourses at Bridge of Avon and Bridge of Brown.

Beyond Grantown-on-Spey the road ran north and west, crossing the powerful River Findhorn at Dulsie Bridge and continuing northwestwards to cross the River Nairn west of Cawdor. Only short sections of this are in use as modern roads. The final section ran on a straight alignment followed by the modern B9090 and B9006 roads to Ardersier and Fort George.

=== Roads in northeast Scotland ===
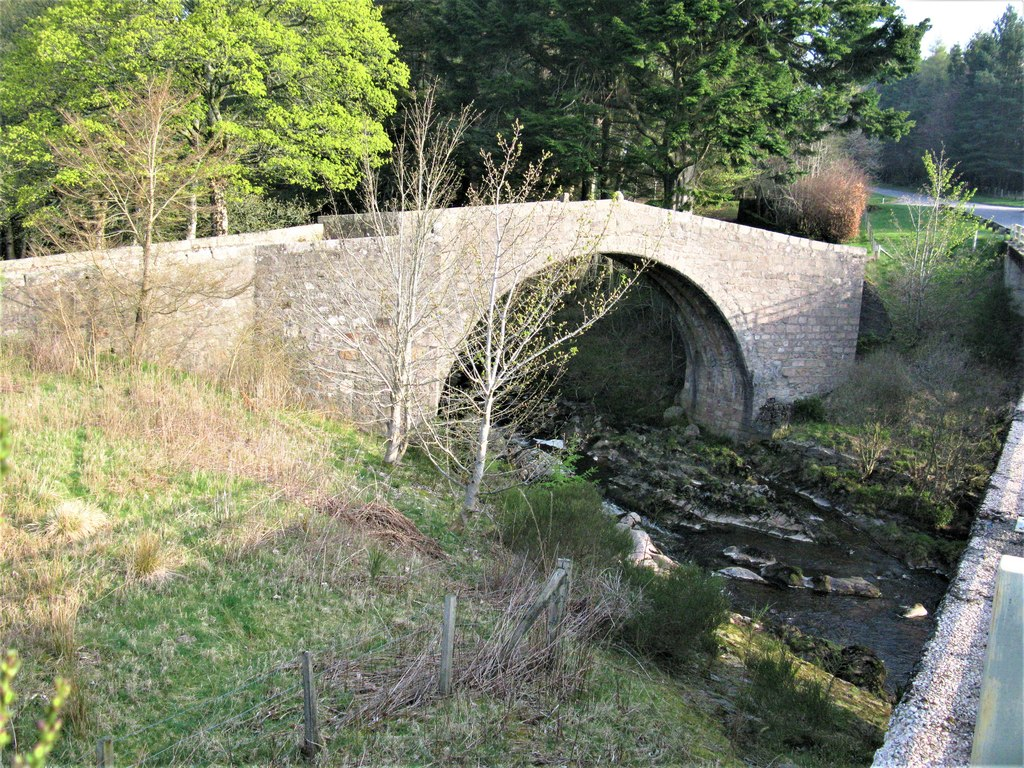
Bridge of Dye north of Cairn o' Mount

Roads in Aberdeenshire and Banffshire long predated the military but from about 1752 troops under Caulfeild were involved in improvements at least partially at military expense to about 250 miles (400 kilometres) of road. A major route was from Fettercairn over Cairn o' Mount and via Alford, Keith and Huntly to Fochabers. The military improved and maintained this road from about 1761 to 1784 but at Potarch the River Dee always had to be crossed by ferry. Other routes went from Stonehaven via Aberdeen and Kintore to Fochabers and Portsoy; also from Portsoy to Huntly; from Corgarff Castle to Aberdeen by the River Don. Stretches of the road along the River Dee were also maintained.

=== Bridge of Sark to Portpatrick ===
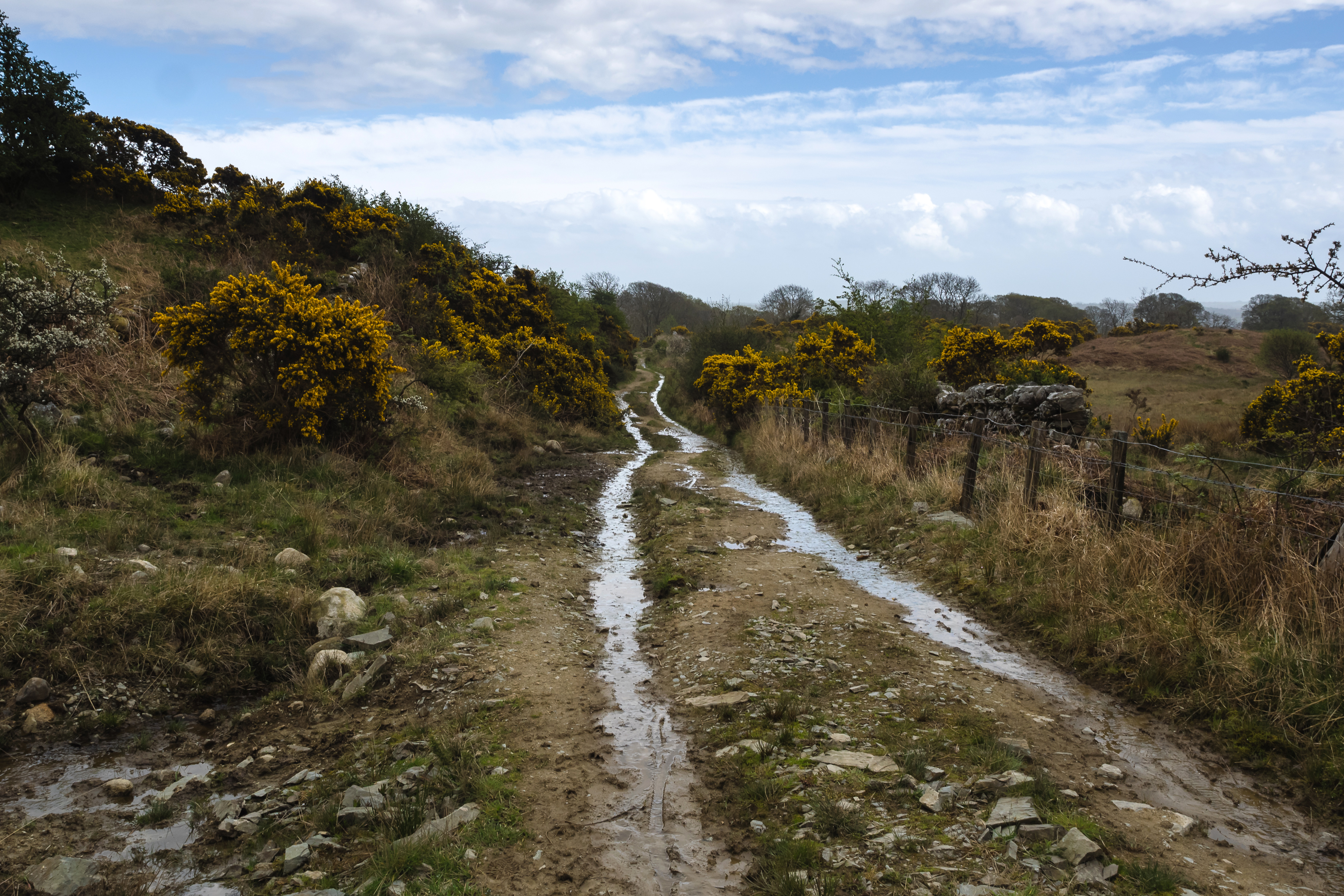
Near Anwoth

Caulfeild also constructed a military road from Bridge of Sark, near Gretna, Dumfries and Galloway, west to Port Patrick on the east coast of the North Channel in Galloway. The road passed through or by Dumfries, Haugh of Urr, Castle Douglas, Bridge of Dee, Gatehouse of Fleet, Creetown, Newton Stewart, Glenluce and Stranraer. It was constructed in the 1760s to assist in the movement of troops to Ireland, making use of sections of existing road. Much of its 105 miles (169 km) now lies under the modern A75 road though other sections are now minor roads or tracks and some sections are entirely lost.

== Subsequent history ==
The highland road building programme ceased with Caulfeild's death in 1767 with some 1,100 miles (1,800 kilometres) having been constructed. Wade was responsible for 300 mi (500 km), Caulfeild for the remaining 800 mi (1,300 km).

As the Jacobite threat receded towards the end of the 18th century so the need for upkeep of the roads for military purposes diminished. Some sections were abandoned entirely where they served little commercial use; travellers, for example, avoided the steeper sections which proved unsuitable for coaches. By 1790 only 600 mi (1,000 km) remained usable. In 1803 the Commissioners of Highland Roads and Bridges were established; it was they who assumed the responsibility for the maintenance and repair of the roads after the military relinquished its role.

The military road between Grantown and Fort George was not one of those whose subsequent repair fell to the commissioners. Rather it was patched in a haphazard way by various landowners and authorities. As the original bridges on this route were washed away by winter floods so a variety of new ones were constructed.

The civilian road network was improved through the nineteenth century by Thomas Telford and others with many sections of Wade’s and Caulfeild’s roads being incorporated into it, though many more sections proved to be irrelevant to the needs of the wider population and fell into disuse. Miles of former road can now be traced stretching across country, either completely abandoned or serving as estate tracks or paths for walks and mountain bikers. In recent years some have been co-opted to form parts of both long-distance paths such as the West Highland Way or as parts of the growing National Cycle Network. A number of sections of the military roads are protected as scheduled monuments for their archaeological value, including at the Corrieyairack Pass, and part of the Fort Augustus to Bernera road.

The Dunkeld to Inverness road gives its name to Neil Munro's novel The New Road.

== Bibliography ==
- Ang, T.; Pollard, M. (1984). Walking the Scottish Highlands: General Wade's Military Roads. London: Andre Deutsch Ltd.
