= List of listed buildings in Dull, Perth and Kinross =

This is a list of listed buildings in the parish of Dull in Perth and Kinross, Scotland.

== List ==
Name	Location	Date Listed	Grid Ref. (Note: Sometimes known as OSGB36, the grid reference (where provided) is based on the British national grid reference system used by the Ordnance Survey. • "Guide to National Grid". Ordnance Survey. • "Get-a-map". Ordnance Survey.)	Geo-coordinates	Notes	LB Number (Note: Historic Environment Scotland assign a unique alphanumeric identifier to each designated site in Scotland, for listed buildings this always begins with "LB", for example "LB12345".)	Image
Camserney Longhouse And Peat Shed				56°37′12″N 3°55′47″W	Category A	5732	Upload Photo
Turrerich Bridge Over River Quaich				56°31′32″N 3°51′52″W	Category C(S)	5739	Upload Photo
St Adamnan's Parish Church Graveyard				56°37′08″N 3°56′48″W	Category B	5748	Upload Photo
Glengoulandie				56°38′55″N 4°00′41″W	Category C(S)	5740	Upload Photo
Tummel Bridge				56°42′28″N 4°01′23″W	Category A	5742	Upload another image See more images
Foss And Tummel Parish Church, Foss				56°41′55″N 3°58′40″W	Category C(S)	5743	Upload Photo
St Adamnan's Parish Church Dull				56°37′09″N 3°56′49″W	Category B	5747	Upload another image
Newhall Bridge Over River Tay				56°35′55″N 3°58′25″W	Category B	5757	Upload Photo
Comrie Castle				56°36′49″N 3°58′43″W	Category B	5759	Upload Photo
Camserney, Redgorton				56°37′19″N 3°55′43″W	Category C(S)	51169	Upload Photo
Dunskiag Farmhouse And Steading				56°36′40″N 3°53′29″W	Category B	6635	Upload Photo
Garrow Bridge Over River Quaich				56°32′22″N 3°54′41″W	Category C(S)	6194	Upload Photo
Bolfracks				56°36′37″N 3°55′15″W	Category B	5737	Upload Photo
Tullicro, East Cottage				56°37′10″N 3°56′01″W	Category C(S)	5751	Upload Photo
Manse Of Dull				56°37′02″N 3°57′10″W	Category B	5750	Upload Photo
Newhall				56°35′50″N 3°58′18″W	Category B	5753	Upload Photo
Amulree And Strathbraan Parish Church With Graveyard, Gates And Gatepiers				56°30′30″N 3°47′26″W	Category B	6362	Upload another image See more images
Foss And Tummel Parish Church, Graveyard				56°41′55″N 3°58′40″W	Category C(S)	5744	Upload Photo
Cross, Dull				56°37′08″N 3°56′44″W	Category B	5749	Upload Photo
Main Lodge And Gates, Taymouth Castle				56°35′50″N 3°58′01″W	Category B	5752	Upload Photo
Camserney, Old Mill Of Camserney And Mill House				56°37′14″N 3°55′30″W	Category B	5734	Upload Photo
Camserney, Smithy Cottage, Former Smithy And Limekiln				56°37′18″N 3°55′29″W	Category B	5738	Upload Photo
Tullicro, West Cottage Including The Barn And The Bothy				56°37′10″N 3°56′04″W	Category B	5756	Upload Photo
Comrie Cottage (Formerly: Until Recently Property Of Comrie Farm, Now In Process Of Sale)				56°36′50″N 3°59′14″W	Category B	5760	Upload Photo
Comrie Farm Steading, Millhouse, Tower House, Ghillies House And The Courtyard				56°36′50″N 3°59′34″W	Category B	5761	Upload Photo
Grampian Hydro Electric Scheme, Tummel Power Station				56°42′23″N 4°01′16″W	Category A	51715	Upload Photo
Keltneyburn Hall				56°37′07″N 4°00′01″W	Category C(S)	6361	Upload Photo
Tomphubil Limekiln				56°40′00″N 3°59′44″W	Category B	5741	Upload Photo
Camserney, Crachan Cottage Including Ancillary Buildings				56°37′21″N 3°55′49″W	Category B	5758	Upload Photo

== Key ==
The scheme for classifying buildings in Scotland is:

- Category A: "buildings of national or international importance, either architectural or historic; or fine, little-altered examples of some particular period, style or building type."
- Category B: "buildings of regional or more than local importance; or major examples of some particular period, style or building type, which may have been altered."
- Category C: "buildings of local importance; lesser examples of any period, style, or building type, as originally constructed or moderately altered; and simple traditional buildings which group well with other listed buildings."

In March 2016 there were 47,288 listed buildings in Scotland. Of these, 8% were Category A, and 50% were Category B, with the remaining 42% being Category C.
