= Siege of Fort Augustus (December 1745) =

1745 siege

- Part of the Jacobite rising of 1745
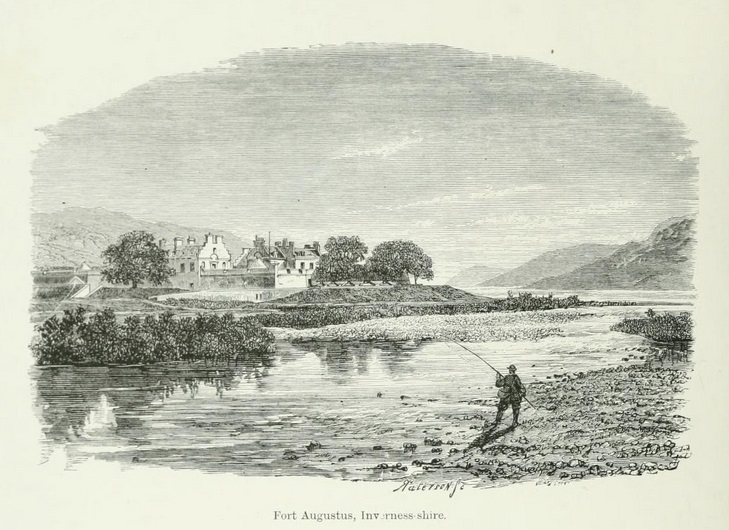
- Fort Augustus, Inverness-shire, Francis Groome
Date	December 1745
Location	Fort Augustus, Scotland, Great Britain
Result	Government victory

Belligerents
(Kingdom of Great Britain) Government	Jacobites

Commanders and leaders
John Campbell	Simon Fraser

Strength
600	Unknown

Casualties and losses
Unknown	Unknown

The first siege of Fort Augustus, at the SW end of Loch Ness, Scotland, took place in December 1745 and was part of the Jacobite rising of 1745.

== Siege ==
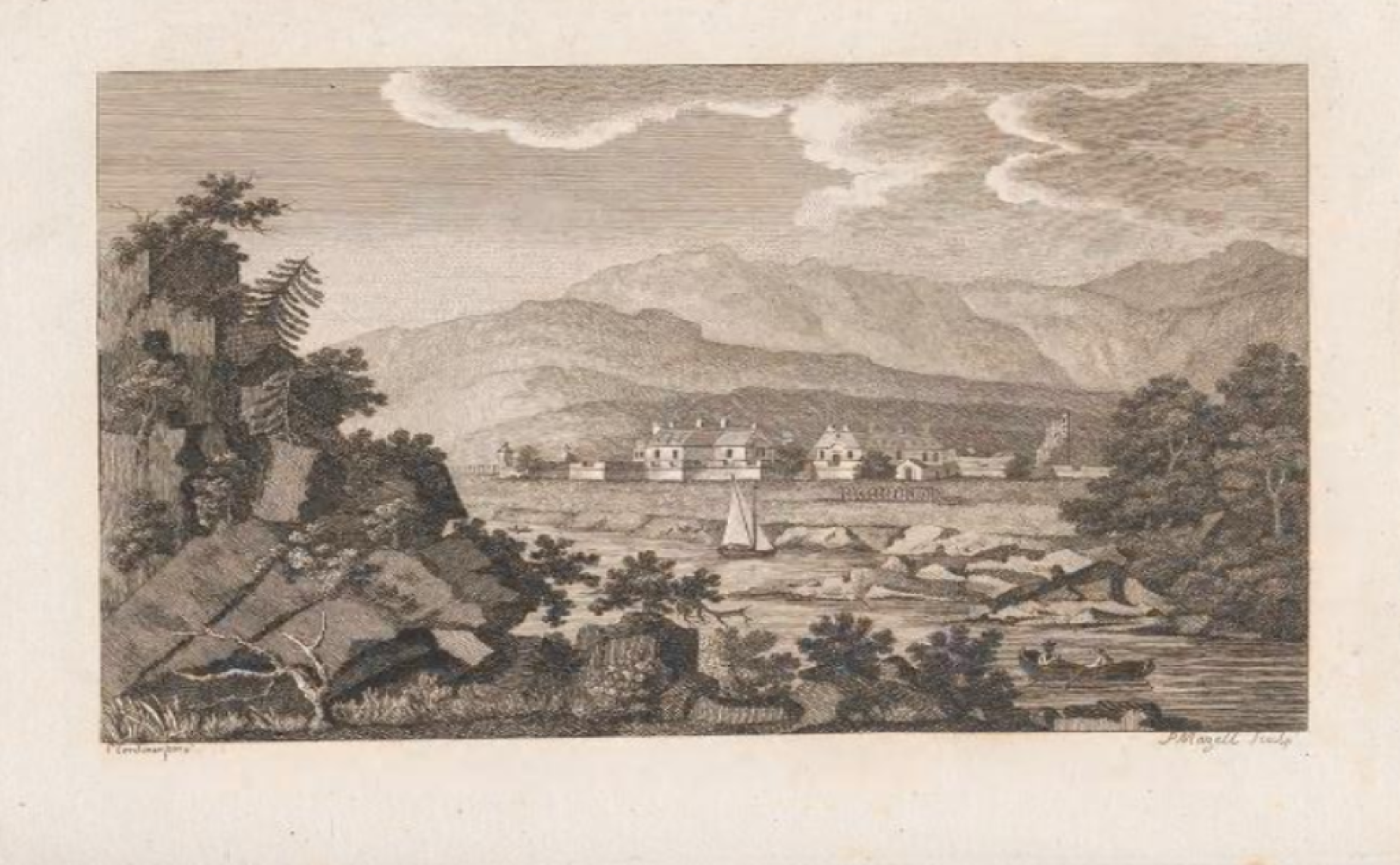
Another drawing of the old fort c.1788

A force of 600 men from the recently formed Independent Highland Companies, formed to support the British-Hanoverian government, liberated the fort from the Jacobite Clan Fraser of Lovat after a small skirmish. Apart from this slight skirmish there was no fighting in the siege and there were no casualties.

== Aftermath ==
The Clan Fraser had originally supported the British Government during the Jacobite rebellion of 1715–1716. However, during the rebellion of 1745–1746 a large number of them supported the Jacobite cause. Shortly after the siege of Fort Augustus, Lord Loudoun with 600 men of the Independent Companies of Sutherland, Mackay, Grant and Munro went in search of Simon Fraser, 11th Lord Lovat who was the chief of Clan Fraser. Lord Lovat had allowed his son to go off with a band of Frasers to join the Jacobite leader Prince Charles. The idea was that Lord Lovat would be 'made a hostage for the peaceable behaviour of his clan'. However Lord Lovat, who had originally agreed to this move, escaped from his home at Castle Downie, evading capture. This move was to stop any more of the Clan Fraser joining his son (the Master of Lovat) and the 300 Frasers who had already defected to the Jacobites. Lord Lovat made the excuse that 'he could not govern his son and some of the young men of his name'.
