= The Lovat Hotel =

- Interactive map of the The Lovat Hotel area

General information
- Location: Fort Augustus, Highland, Scotland; PH32 4DU
- Coordinates: 57.14381°N 4.68235°W
- Opening: c. 1869
- Owner: Caroline Gregory

Technical details
- Floor count: 2

Other information
- Number of rooms: 28
- Number of restaurants: 1
- Parking: Yes

Website
- thelovat.com

The Lovat Hotel is a hotel in Fort Augustus, at the southern end of Loch Ness in Scotland, originally built in the 1860s. It stands on the site of Kilwhimen Barracks, one of only four Hanoverian forts built to pacify the Highlands after the Jacobite rising of 1715 & Jacobite rising of 1719. The west curtain wall of the old fort still stands in the hotel grounds and measures 34 metres long by 4 metres high.

Bonnie Prince Charlie was in the barracks before he ordered the bombardment of the later Abbey Fort where the present day Fort Augustus Abbey now stands.

== As a hotel, 1869 - present ==
Around 1869, Murdoch Bayne became the first person to run the building as a hotel. At this time, it was known as "The Inn". On 22 July 1903, the Invergarry and Fort Augustus Railway was opened, running from Fort Augustus to Spean Bridge, and the hotel changed names to "The Lovat Arms & Station Hotel". The railway line closed temporarily on 31 October 1911, reopened again on 1 August 1913 before finally closing on 31 December 1946.

== Hotel facilities ==
The hotel has 29 rooms on two floors and an award-winning 3 rosette restaurant, Station Road. The hotel acts as a wedding venue and can be exclusively hired for a conference or celebration. The hotel is located on Loch Ness in the Scottish Highlands and near Cawdor Castle, Urquhart Castle and the Caledonian Canal.

=== Awards ===
- VisitScotland, the Scottish tourist board, has awarded The Lovat Hotel a Gold Award
- The Lovat hotel is in VisitScotland's Green Tourism Business Scheme
- AA has awarded The Lovat Hotel four stars and the Hotel Restaurant, Station Road with 3 Red Rosettes.
