= Kilchuimen Academy =

Secondary school in Highland, Scotland

Location
- Station Road; Fort Augustus, Highland, PH324DL; Scotland
- Coordinates: 57.1435°N 4.6853°W

Information
- Type: Comprehensive/State Secondary
- Headteacher: Maria Frances Gibbons
- Age: 12 to 18
- Enrolment: Approx 70-80
- Houses: Caledonia/Scotia
- Colour: Caledonia-Red/Scotia-Blue

Kilchuimen Academy is a small secondary school located in Fort Augustus in Scotland. It shares its campus with neighbouring Kilchuimen Primary. The school has approximately 80 students enrolled. In 2009 the school saw the arrival of a new M.U.G.A (multi use games area) for the local community to use. In late 2010 the school received a grant of £18,000 to send its students to partnered schools in the Netherlands and Germany. The German partnered school is Gymnasium Querfurt.
