= Tummel Bridge =

Bridge at Loch Tummel, Perth and Kinross, Scotland

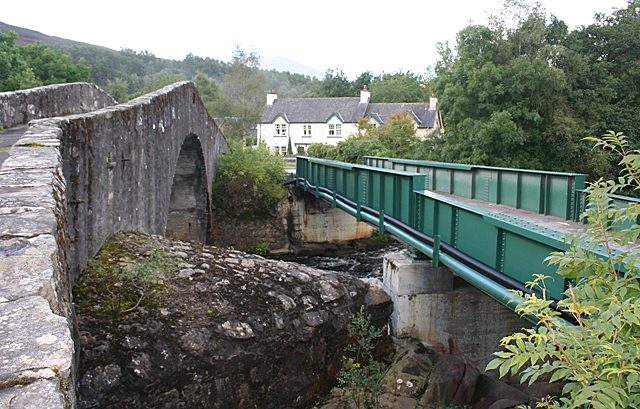
- The bridge (left) in 2010, looking northeast
- Coordinates: 56.70783°N 4.0230°W
- Crosses: River Tummel
- Locale: Perth and Kinross

History
- Opened: 1730 (296 years ago)

Listed Building – Category A
- Official name: Old Tummel Bridge carrying former military road over River Tummel, including 2 milestones, Tummel Bridge
- Designated: 4 October 1971
- Reference no.: LB5742

Location
- Interactive map of Tummel Bridge

Tummel Bridge is a double arched hump-backed former military bridge crossing the River Tummel at Tummel Bridge, Perth and Kinross, Scotland. A Category A listed structure dating to 1730, it is now pedestrian-only. It stands immediately to the southeast of a modern road bridge, which carries the vehicular traffic of today's B846 road. Two worn milestones are at the northern end of the bridge.

Erected for the Board of Ordnance, to the order of Lieutenant General George Wade, its original purpose was as a military road. The Irvine Robertson papers at the National Records of Scotland contain, at GD1/53/97, the construction contract with John Stewart of Canagan [=Kynachan], for building the bridge, and the receipt by John Stewart for £50, in respect of above contract, 27 July 1730, and the bond by him and David Stewart, his eldest son, to maintain the bridge, 20 October 1730:

... the said John Stewart shall Build a Stone Bridge Strengthen'd with a double Arch over the River of Tumble, within less than a mile west of the house of the said Canagan, which Bridge is to have an Arch of at least forty two feet between the landstools for more if the breadth of the River shall require an Arch of a larger dimension. It is likewise to be twelve foot in breadth including the Parapet walls, which Walls are to be three foot high above the pavement, and at least one foot broad, and to be Cap'd with good flag Stones. The whole to be of good materials and well wrought, And to have an access to the same extending so far on both Sides to the Land, as to render it easily passable for Wheel Carriage or Canon, AND LIKEWISE to make sufficient Buttments that shall Confine the Water to pass under the Arch, that in extraordinary Floods it may not damage or undermine the foundation. For which Bridge and all Materials, and Charges relating thereto, the said Lieut General George Wade is to Pay to the said John Stewart, the Sum of two hundred pounds Sterling Viz Fifty pounds on the signing this contact, and one hundred and fifty Pounds as soon as the work is Compleated, which he promises to finish before the last day of October next ensuing, and the said John Stewart does oblige himself to give sufficient Security before the last Payment is made to uphold the said Bridge at his own Expense for the space of twenty years from the date hereof...

The bridge was renovated in 1973, and underwent conservation work in 2011.

== Climate ==
Climate data for Tummel Bridge, Elevation: 148 m (486 ft), 1991–2020 normals
Month	Jan	Feb	Mar	Apr	May	Jun	Jul	Aug	Sep	Oct	Nov	Dec	Year
Mean daily maximum °C (°F)	6.1 (43.0)	6.5 (43.7)	8.9 (48.0)	12.0 (53.6)	15.3 (59.5)	17.8 (64.0)	19.3 (66.7)	18.4 (65.1)	15.9 (60.6)	11.9 (53.4)	8.6 (47.5)	5.6 (42.1)	12.2 (53.9)
Daily mean °C (°F)	2.8 (37.0)	2.8 (37.0)	4.7 (40.5)	7.1 (44.8)	9.8 (49.6)	12.6 (54.7)	14.4 (57.9)	13.6 (56.5)	11.5 (52.7)	8.1 (46.6)	5.0 (41.0)	2.3 (36.1)	7.9 (46.2)
Mean daily minimum °C (°F)	−0.5 (31.1)	−0.8 (30.6)	0.6 (33.1)	2.2 (36.0)	4.3 (39.7)	7.5 (45.5)	9.6 (49.3)	8.9 (48.0)	7.2 (45.0)	4.3 (39.7)	1.5 (34.7)	−1.0 (30.2)	3.7 (38.6)
Average precipitation mm (inches)	150.8 (5.94)	98.7 (3.89)	87.0 (3.43)	57.5 (2.26)	62.2 (2.45)	62.9 (2.48)	71.7 (2.82)	84.7 (3.33)	78.3 (3.08)	129.5 (5.10)	134.3 (5.29)	137.0 (5.39)	1,154.6 (45.46)
Source: Met Office

== Gallery ==
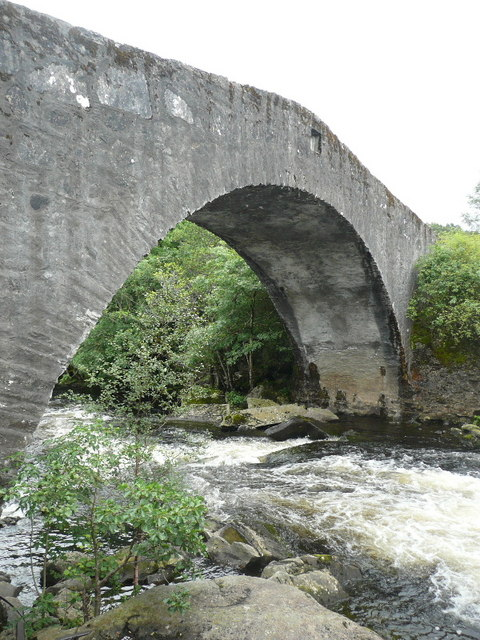
Bridge detail. The plaque denoting the bridge's year of completion is also in view

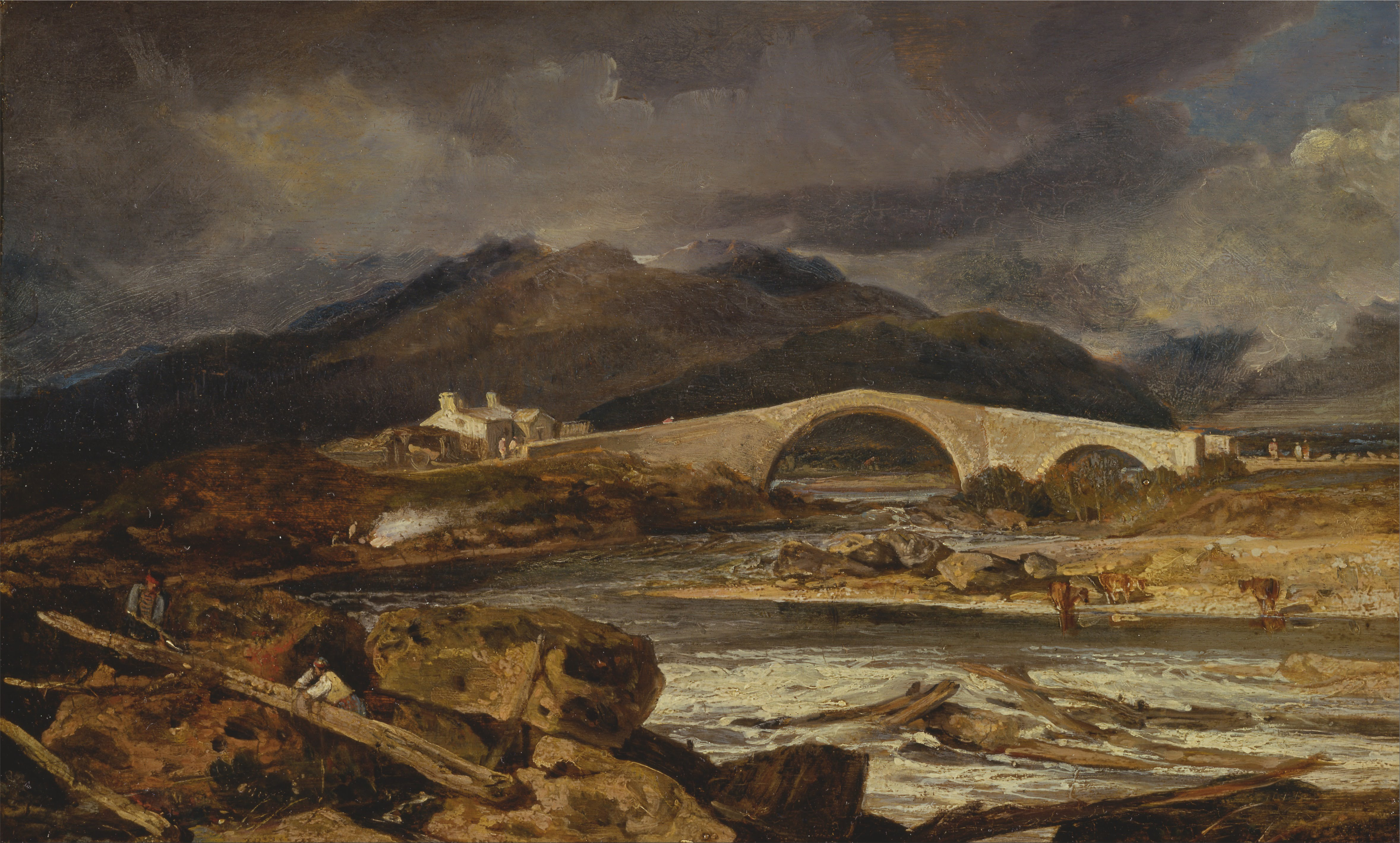
Tummel Bridge painting by Joseph Mallord William Turner, 1802

== See also ==
- List of listed buildings in Dull, Perth and Kinross
- List of bridges in Scotland
