= Fort Augustus =

Village in Scotland

Coordinates: 57.1432°N 4.6807°W

Fort Augustus: Scottish Gaelic: Cille Chuimein
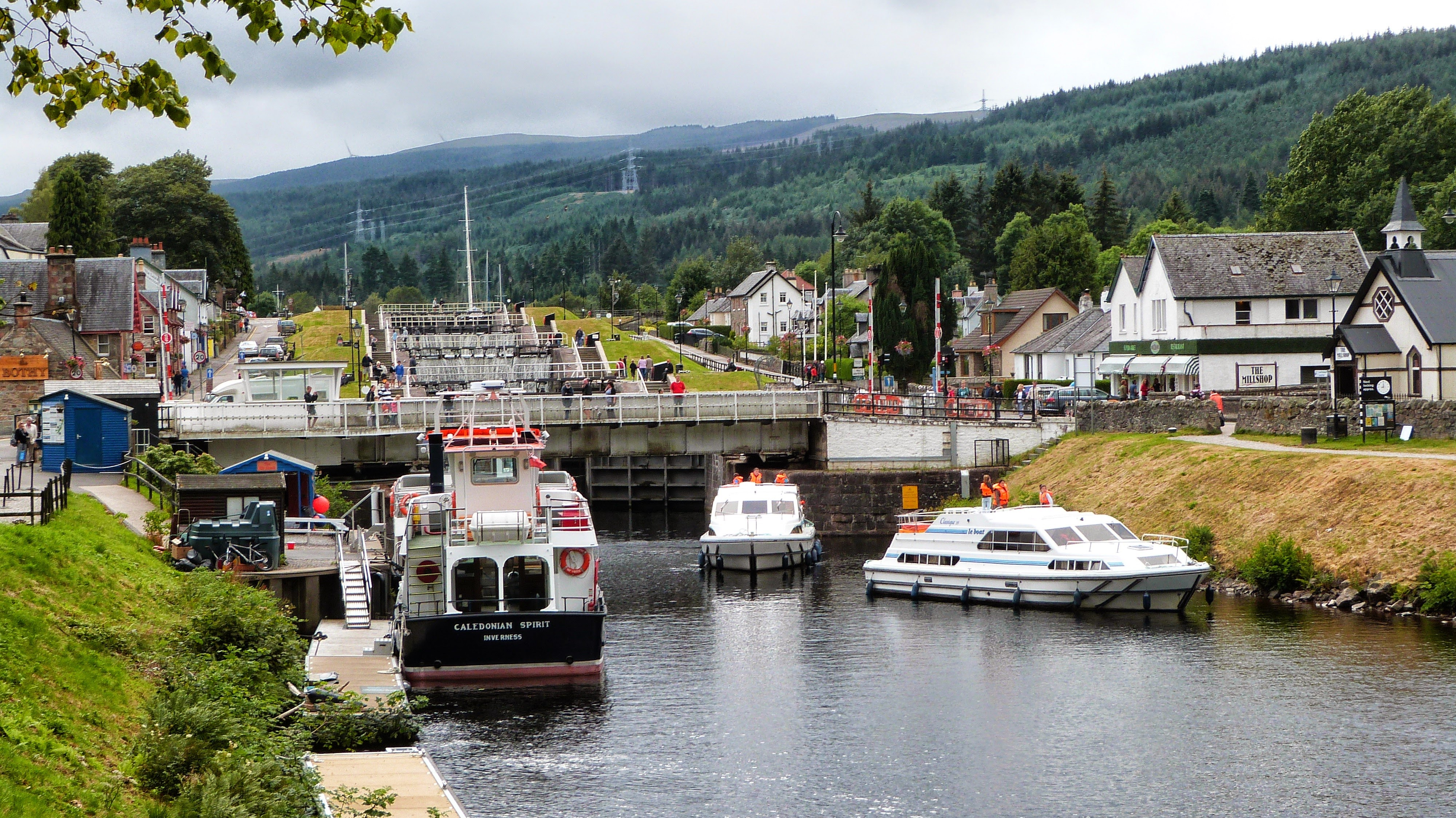
- Swing bridge and locks at Fort Augustus

- Location within the Inverness area
- Population: 620 (2020)
- OS grid reference: NH379090
  - Edinburgh: 100 mi (161 km)
  - London: 430 mi (692 km)
- Council area: Highland
- Country: Scotland
- Sovereign state: United Kingdom
- Post town: Fort Augustus
- Postcode district: PH32
- Dialling code: 01320
- Police: Scotland
- Fire: Scottish
- Ambulance: Scottish
- UK Parliament: Inverness, Skye and West Ross-shire
- Scottish Parliament: Skye, Lochaber and Badenoch; Highlands and Islands

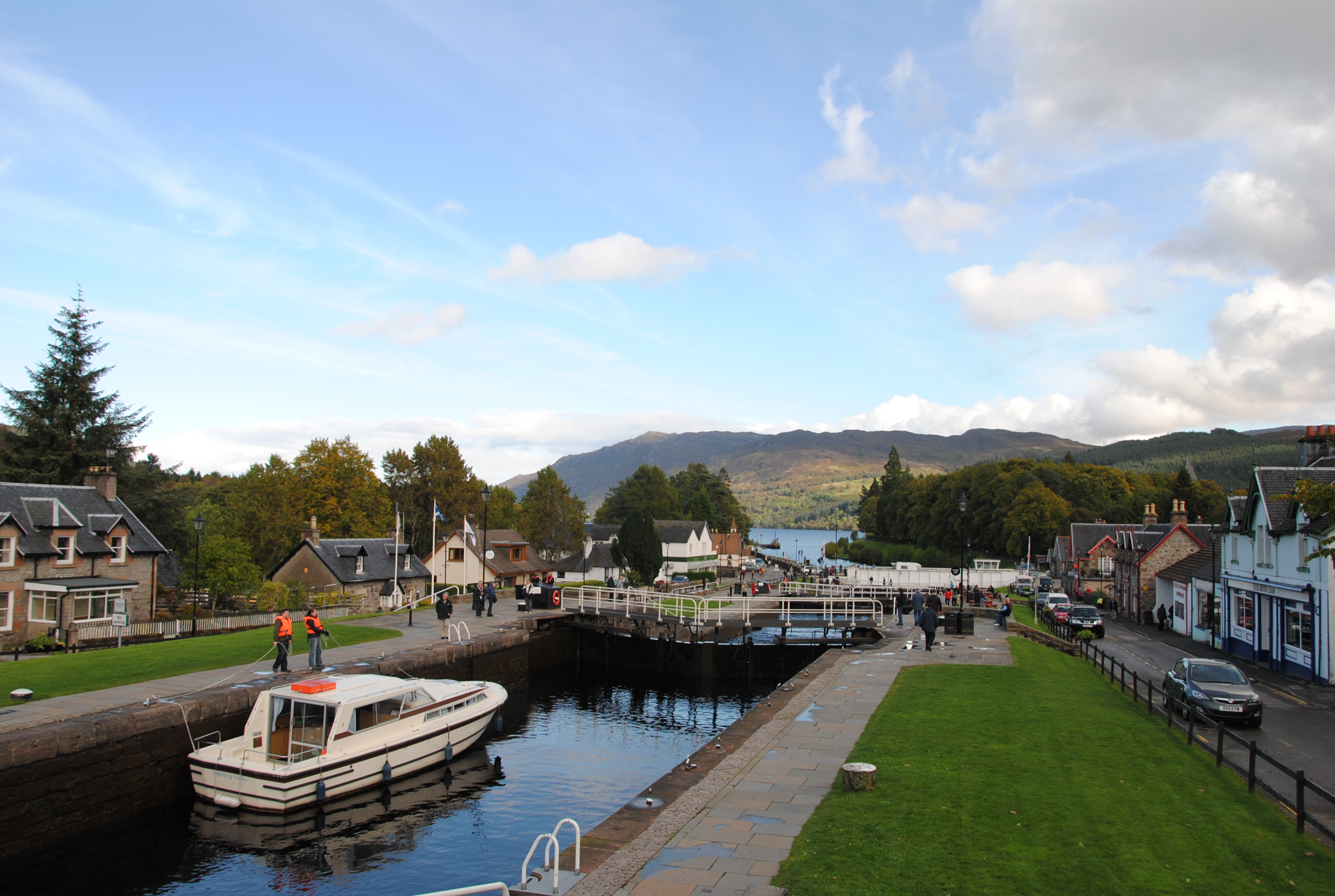
Locks on the Caledonian Canal in Fort Augustus, looking towards Loch Ness

Fort Augustus is a settlement in the parish of Boleskine and Abertarff, at the south-west end of Loch Ness, Scottish Highlands. The village has a population of around 620 (2020). Its economy is heavily reliant on tourism.

== History ==
=== Early history ===
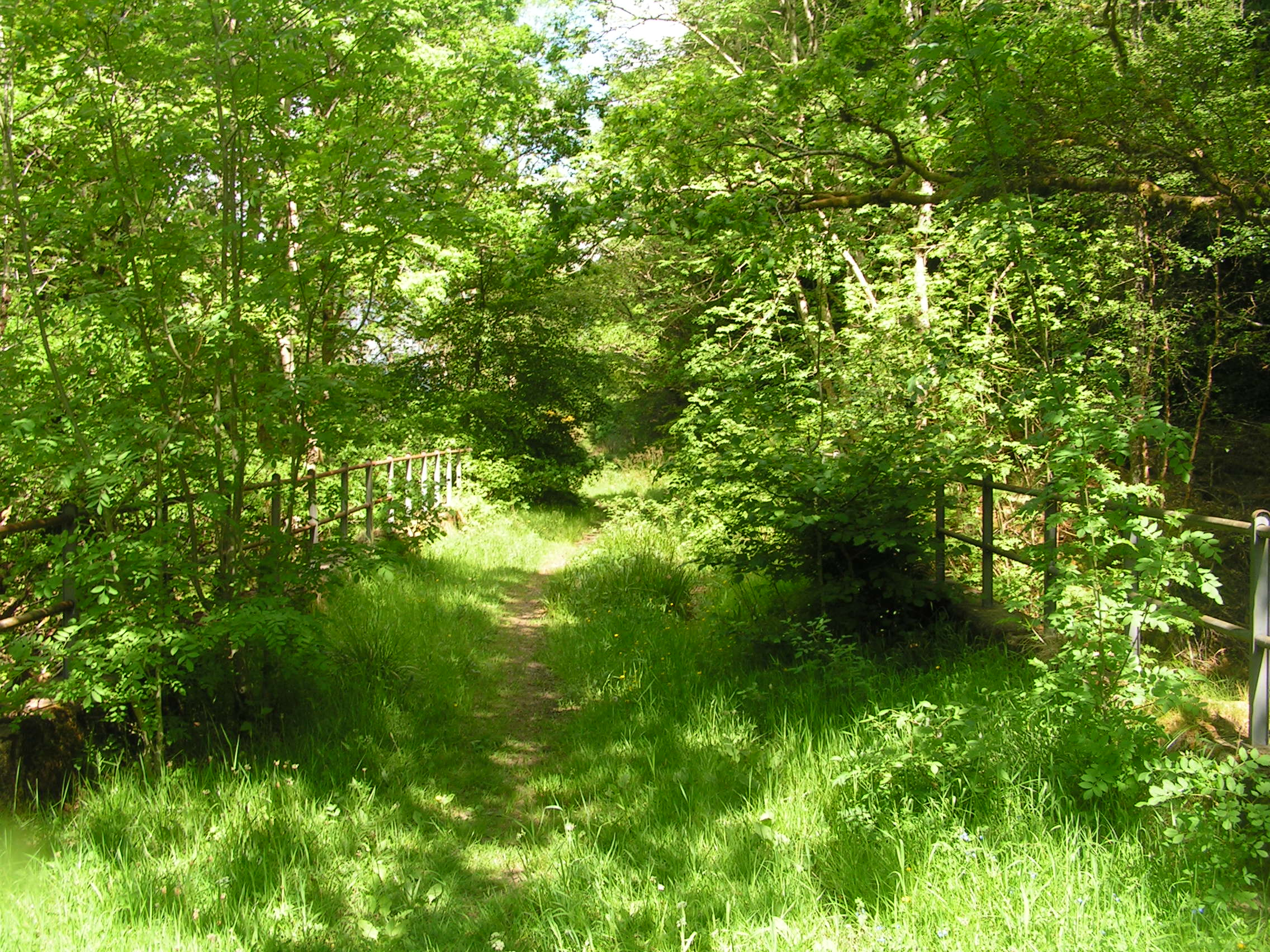
Section of dismantled railway south of Fort Augustus

Sir George Macdonald—in relation to the finding of a hoard of Roman coins in 1767 near the city's ancient Benedictine Abbey—wrote about the possibility that Fort Augustus was built on a Roman small fortification built under Diocletian's rule.

The Gaelic name for the modern village is Cille Chuimein ([ˈkʲiʎə ˈxumɛɲ]) and until the early 18th century the settlement was called Kiliwhimin. It was renamed Fort Augustus after the Jacobite rising of 1715. The accepted etymology is that the settlement was originally named after Saint Cummein of Iona who built a church there. Other suggestions are that it was originally called Ku Chuimein after one of two abbots of Iona of the Comyn clan, whose badge Lus mhic Chuimein refers to the cumin plant, or that it was called Cill a' Chuimein ("Comyn's Burialplace") after the last Comyn in Lochaber.

=== The Fort ===
In the aftermath of the Jacobite rising of 1715, General Wade built a fort (taking from 1729 until 1742) which was named after Prince William Augustus, Duke of Cumberland. Wade had planned to build a town around the new barracks and call it Wadesburgh. The settlement grew, and eventually took the name of this fort. In December, 1745, during the Jacobite rising of 1745, a force of 600 men from the recently formed Independent Highland Companies, formed to support the British-Hanoverian government, laid siege and liberated the fort from the Jacobite Clan Fraser of Lovat after a small skirmish. From 22 February to 1 March 1746, the Jacobites laid siege to the fort and the government garrison surrendered.

A hoard of Roman coins was unearthed in 1767 near the ancient Benedictine abbey that are thought to be from Roman to Late Iron Age - 79 AD to 560 AD.

In 1867, the fort was sold to the Lovat family, and in 1876 they passed the site and land to the Benedictine order. The monks established Fort Augustus Abbey and later a school. The school operated until 1993 when it closed owing to changing educational patterns in Scotland causing a decline in enrollment. The monks employed Tony Harmsworth to devise a rescue package which saw the site converted into the largest private heritage centre in Scotland which operated between 1994 and 1998; however, the heritage centre failed to generate sufficient profit to maintain the buildings. In 1998 the monks abandoned the site, and it reverted to the Lovat family which in turn sold it to Terry Nutkins. He also owned The Lovat Hotel that stands on the site of the old Kilwhimen Barracks, one of four built in 1718. This site houses the west curtain wall of the old Fort, intact with gun embrasures. The Lovat was originally built as the local Station Hotel.

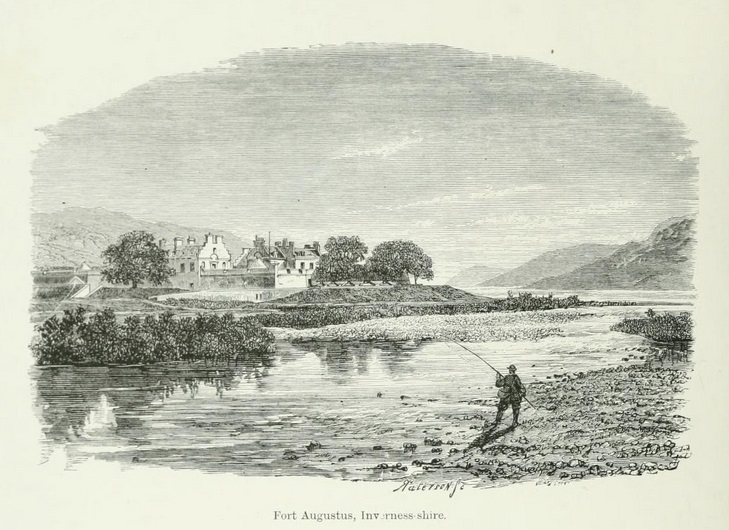
The old fort

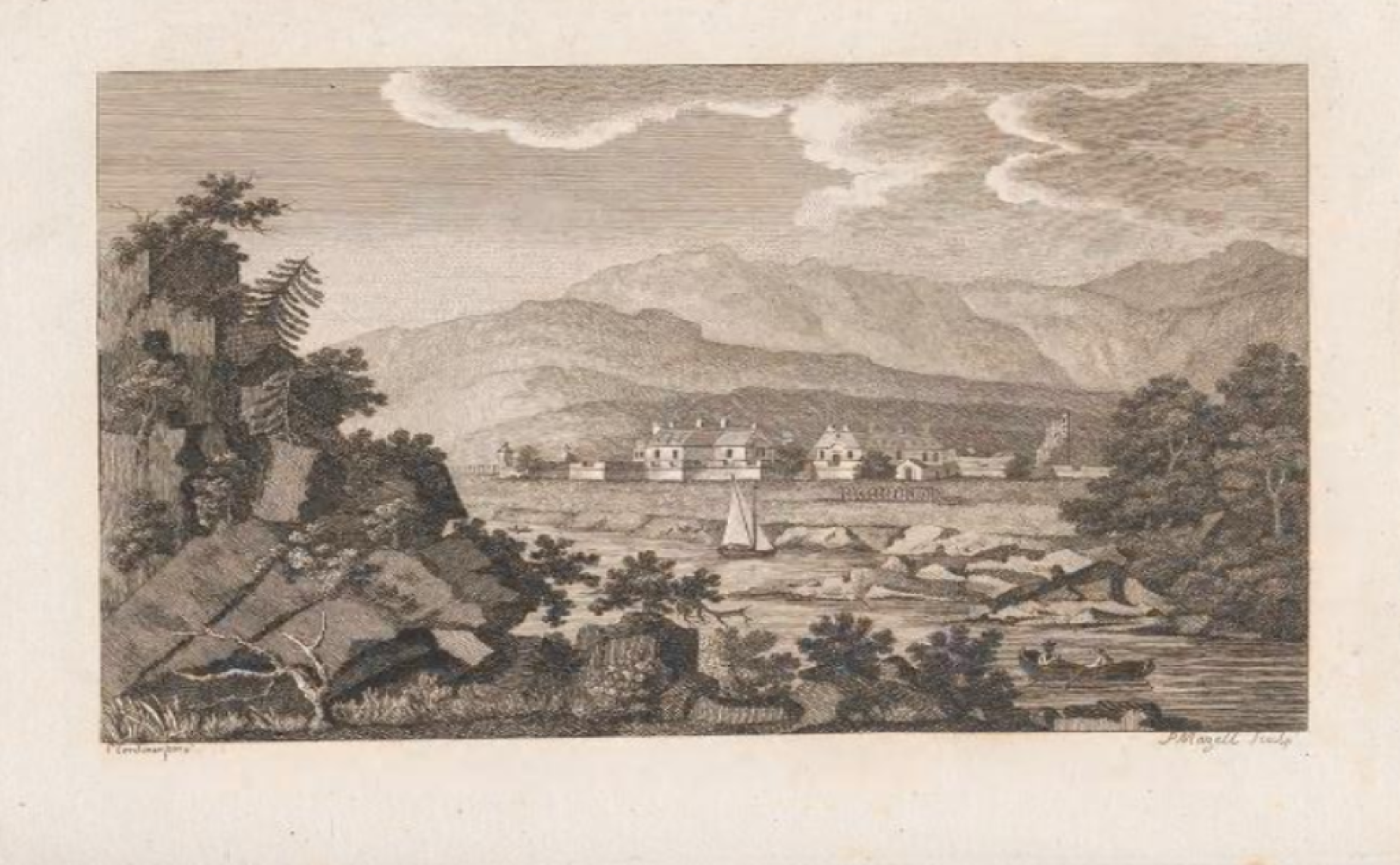
The old fort

== Infrastructure ==
The village is served by the A82 road and lies approximately midway between Inverness 35 mi (56 km) and Fort William 32 mi (51 km).

The village was served by a rail line from Spean Bridge to a terminus on the banks of Loch Ness from 1903 until 1933, built by the Invergarry and Fort Augustus Railway in the hope of eventually completing a line to Inverness and latterly operated by the North British Railway and its successor, the London and North Eastern Railway, but initially operated by the Highland Railway. The Caledonian Canal connecting Fort William to Inverness passes through Fort Augustus in a dramatic series of locks stepping down to Loch Ness.

The village is served by the Cill Chuimein Medical Centre.

The village has both a primary school and a secondary school – Kilchuimen Primary School and Kilchuimen Academy – which share a campus.

== Climate ==
As with most of the British Isles and Scotland, Fort Augustus has an oceanic climate (Köppen: Cfb) with cool summers and mild winters. Like a lot of the surrounding area, sunshine levels are low at around 1,005 hours per annum and temperatures are unpredictable – Fort Augustus holds the UK's joint lowest May temperature record of −9.4 °C (15.1 °F). This is the latest point in the run-up to summer that such a low temperature has been recorded, suggesting it can become a frost trap on calm clear nights due to its valley location. That same low-lying topography can also give rise to some high temperatures on occasion – Fort Augustus held the UK daily high temperature record for 16 December for almost 80 years.

Climate data for Fort Augustus (23 m or 75 ft asl, averages 1991–2020)
Month	Jan	Feb	Mar	Apr	May	Jun	Jul	Aug	Sep	Oct	Nov	Dec	Year
Record high °C (°F)	15.6 (60.1)	14.4 (57.9)	21.1 (70.0)	23.4 (74.1)	27.4 (81.3)	30.0 (86.0)	29.7 (85.5)	30.6 (87.1)	26.9 (80.4)	22.8 (73.0)	17.2 (63.0)	15.0 (59.0)	30.6 (87.1)
Mean daily maximum °C (°F)	6.3 (43.3)	6.9 (44.4)	8.8 (47.8)	11.9 (53.4)	14.9 (58.8)	16.8 (62.2)	18.6 (65.5)	18.5 (65.3)	16.2 (61.2)	12.1 (53.8)	8.8 (47.8)	6.5 (43.7)	12.2 (54.0)
Daily mean °C (°F)	3.7 (38.7)	4.0 (39.2)	5.5 (41.9)	7.8 (46.0)	10.4 (50.7)	13.0 (55.4)	14.8 (58.6)	14.6 (58.3)	12.5 (54.5)	8.9 (48.0)	5.8 (42.4)	3.6 (38.5)	8.7 (47.7)
Mean daily minimum °C (°F)	1.0 (33.8)	1.1 (34.0)	2.2 (36.0)	3.7 (38.7)	6.0 (42.8)	9.1 (48.4)	10.9 (51.6)	10.6 (51.1)	8.8 (47.8)	5.7 (42.3)	2.8 (37.0)	0.8 (33.4)	5.2 (41.4)
Record low °C (°F)	−17.2 (1.0)	−13.9 (7.0)	−12.2 (10.0)	−6.7 (19.9)	−5.0 (23.0)	−2.8 (27.0)	1.6 (34.9)	−0.6 (30.9)	−3.3 (26.1)	−6.7 (19.9)	−12.2 (10.0)	−16.7 (1.9)	−17.2 (1.0)
Average precipitation mm (inches)	190.6 (7.50)	132.5 (5.22)	112.2 (4.42)	66.8 (2.63)	68.4 (2.69)	67.4 (2.65)	71.3 (2.81)	93.2 (3.67)	104.9 (4.13)	140.3 (5.52)	136.1 (5.36)	175.8 (6.92)	1,359.4 (53.52)
Average precipitation days (≥ 1.0 mm)	18.5	16.6	16.6	13.7	13.4	13.0	14.3	14.8	14.3	18.4	17.4	18.6	189.5
Mean monthly sunshine hours	26.2	54.5	82.4	128.3	162.5	129.5	115.4	113.0	91.1	56.4	27.1	18.5	1,005
Source 1: Met Office
Source 2: Starlings Roost Weather

== Notable people ==
- Guy Prendergast (1905–1986), explorer and soldier. Buried in Strathoich cemetery.
- Alexander Fraser (1789-1872). Soldier and hero of the Battle of Stoney Creek in 1813 (War of 1812) who captured the two American commanding generals on the battlefield.

== Transport ==
Buses are run by Ember, Scottish Citylink, West Coast Motors and Highland Council.

== See also ==
- Glen Urquhart
