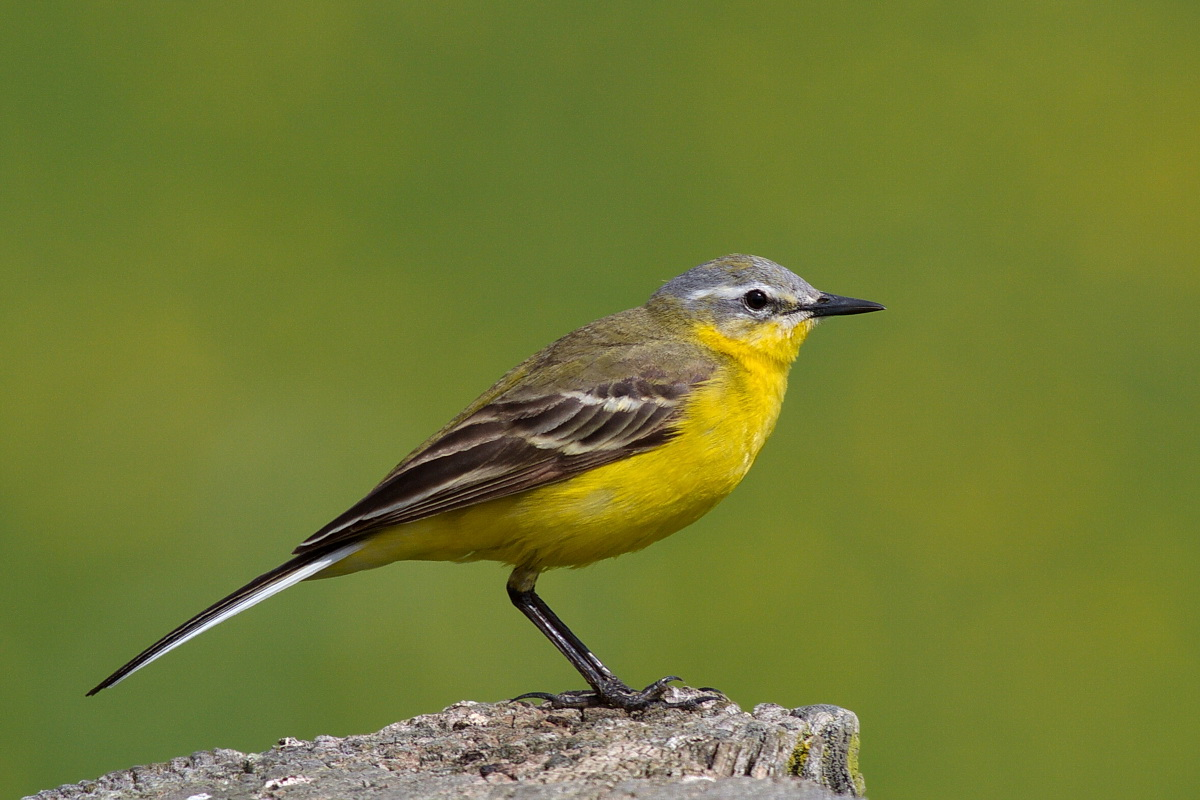
- Adult male blue-headed wagtail (M. f. flava)

Conservation status
- Least Concern (IUCN 3.1)

Scientific classification
- Kingdom: Animalia
- Phylum: Chordata
- Class: Aves
- Order: Passeriformes
- Family: Motacillidae
- Genus: Motacilla
- Species: M. flava

Binomial name
- Motacilla flava Linnaeus, 1758

Subspecies
- Some 15-20, but see text
- Range Breeding Resident Passage Non-breeding

Synonyms
- Motacilla tschutschensis (but see text)

= Western yellow wagtail =

Species of bird

The western yellow wagtail (Motacilla flava) is a small passerine bird in the wagtail family Motacillidae, which also includes the pipits and longclaws. This species breeds in much of temperate Europe and Asia. Most populations are migratory, moving south to tropical Africa and southern Asia for the winter; the small population breeding in Egypt is however resident there.

It is a slender 15–16 cm long bird, with the characteristic long, constantly wagging tail of its genus. It is the shortest tailed of the European wagtails. The breeding adult male is basically olive above and yellow below. In other plumages, particularly in juveniles, the yellow may be diluted to whitish. The heads of breeding males come in a variety of colours and patterns depending on subspecies. The call is a high-pitched jeet. This insectivorous bird inhabits open country near water, such as wet meadows. It nests in tussocks, laying 4–8 speckled eggs.

== Taxonomy ==
The western yellow wagtail was formally described in 1758 by the Swedish naturalist Carl Linnaeus in the tenth edition of his Systema Naturae under its current binomial name Motacilla flava. In 1555 the Swiss naturalist Conrad Gessner had used the identical Latin name Motacilla Flava when describing this species in his book, Historia animalium. Linnaeus specified the type locality as Europe but this is now restricted to southern Sweden. The genus name Motacilla is the Latin name for the wagtail; although actually a diminutive of motare, "to move about", from medieval times it led to the misunderstanding of cilla as "tail". The specific flava is Latin for golden-yellow.

This species' systematics and phylogeny is confusing. Dozens of subspecies have been described at one time or another, and some 15-20 are currently considered valid depending on which author reviews them. In addition, the citrine wagtail (M. citreola) forms a cryptic species complex with this bird; both taxa as conventionally delimited are paraphyletic in respect to each other. The populations of the Beringian region are sometimes separated as eastern yellow wagtail (M. tschutschensis).

=== Subspecies ===
The ten recognised subspecies are listed below. Plumage colours refer to males except when noted; females are often hard to impossible to identify to subspecies. Vernacular names of the European subspecies follow Svensson (1992).

Image	Scientific name	Common name	Distribution	Characteristics
Northumberland, UK	M. f. flavissima (Blyth, 1834)	Yellow wagtail	Breeding: England, east Wales, southeast Scotland; occasionally on adjacent European coasts. Winter: West Africa, mostly Senegal, Gambia.	Yellow-green head with a brighter yellow supercilium. Females markedly paler below than males.
Bashkortostan, Russia	M. f. lutea (S. G. Gmelin, 1774)	Yellow-headed wagtail	Breeding: Lower Volga to Irtysh River and Lake Zaysan. Winter: Africa and Indian subcontinent.	Head yellow with green neck in males, females like a somewhat more vivid M. f. flava female.
Arnhem, Netherlands	M. f. flava Linnaeus, 1758	Blue-headed wagtail	Breeding: southern Scandinavia (and occasionally on the east coast of Great Britain) to France and central European mountain ranges, east to the Urals. Winter: sub-Saharan Africa.	Blue-grey head with white supercilium and malar stripe in males, much washed with dull green in females.
Tyumen, Russia	M. f. beema (Sykes, 1832)	Sykes's wagtail	Breeding: North of M. f. lutea, east to Ladakh area. Winter: Indian subcontinent, also east Africa and adjacent Arabia.	Like M. f. flava but head lighter grey, ears washed white; females probably indistinguishable from female M. f. flava.
Barcelona, Spain	M. f. iberiae Hartert, 1921	Spanish wagtail	Breeding: south-western France, Iberia, Maghreb from Tunisia to Banc d'Arguin. Winter: The Gambia to the Central African Republic.	Like M. f. flava, but throat white and grey darker, almost black behind eyes.
Tuscany, Italy	M. f. cinereocapilla Savi, 1831	Ashy-headed wagtail	Breeding: south-eastern France, Sicily, Sardinia, Italy, Slovenia. Winter: coastal Tunisia and Algeria, Mali to Lake Chad.	Like M. f. iberiae but supercilium absent or vestigial.
	M. f. pygmaea (A. E. Brehm1854),	Egyptian yellow wagtail	Nile Delta and lower Nile; resident, non-migratory.	Similar to M. f. cinereocapilla, but smaller, less bright.
Penza Oblast, Russia	M. f. leucocephala (Przevalski, 1887)	White-headed wagtail	Breeding: north-west Mongolia and adjacent China and Russia. Winter: probably India.	Male like flava, but grey of head very pale, almost white. Female like M. f. flava females, but head somewhat darker.
Kurdistan, Turkey	M. f. feldegg Michahelles, 1830	Black-headed wagtail	Breeding: Balkans east to the Caspian Sea, south to Turkey, Iran and Afghanistan; also Levant. Winter: central Africa from Nigeria to Uganda and south Sudan, and east to northern India.	Jet black cap in males, females like a dull M. f. thunbergi male above, washed-out dirty yellowish below, throat white.
Oppdal, Norway	M. f. thunbergi Billberg, 1828	Grey-headed wagtail	Breeding: central and northern Scandinavia east to north-west Siberia. Winter: eastern Africa, Indian subcontinent, Southeast Asia.	Head dark grey, reaching down to the cheeks, and without white in males; lighter and washed greenish, with vestigial greenish supercilium in females.

The nominate blue-headed wagtail and yellow wagtail form a narrow hybrid zone in northern France. Birds from this zone vary in appearance, but one type, which resembles nominate blue-headed wagtail (except that the blue tones to the head are paler and more mauve and the white of the head is more extensive, particularly on the throat, ear-coverts, and supercilium) is colloquially referred to as Channel wagtail. A hybrid zone between M. f. flava and M. f. feldegg in Romania and nearby, sometimes distinguished as separate subspecies "M. f. dombrowskii" or "M. f. superciliaris", is also variable, but often like M. f. feldegg except with a white supercilium, rather than a solid black head.

== In culture ==
In the Pyramid Texts of Old Kingdom Egypt, the yellow wagtail was considered a representation of Atum himself and might have been the first inspiration for the Bennu bird, which, in turn, is the supposed inspiration for the phoenix of Greek mythology.

The yellow wagtail is the subject of a poem, Motacilla flava flavissima, in Polly Atkin's 2021 poetry collection, Much With Body.

== Gallery ==
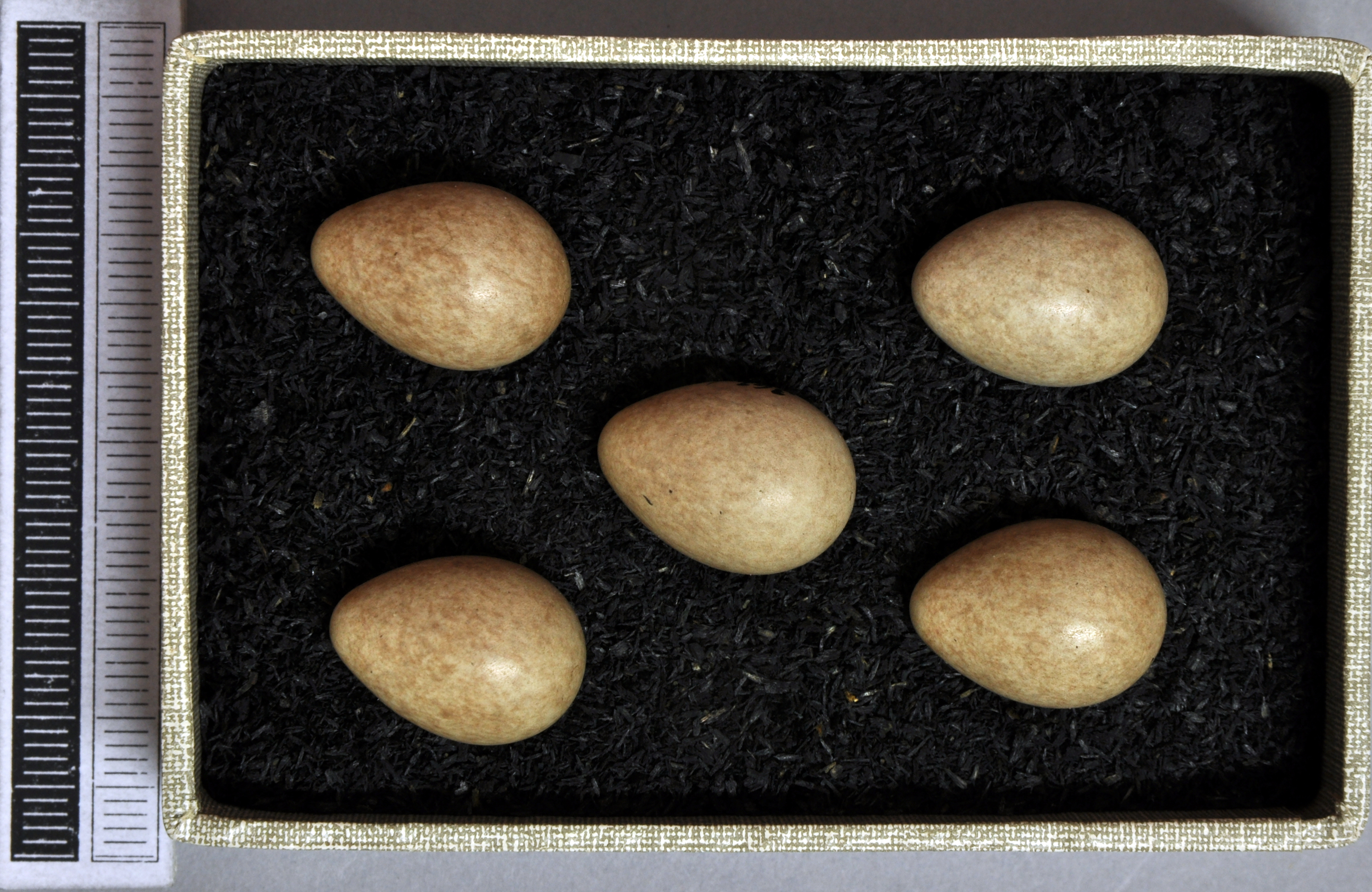
Eggs, Collection Museum Wiesbaden

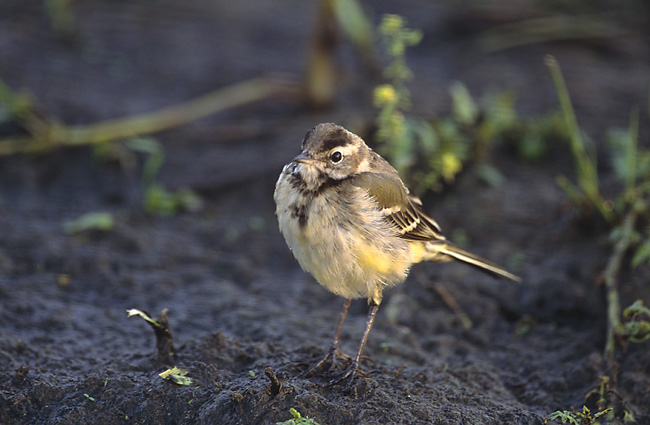
Immature blue-headed wagtail (M. f. flava)

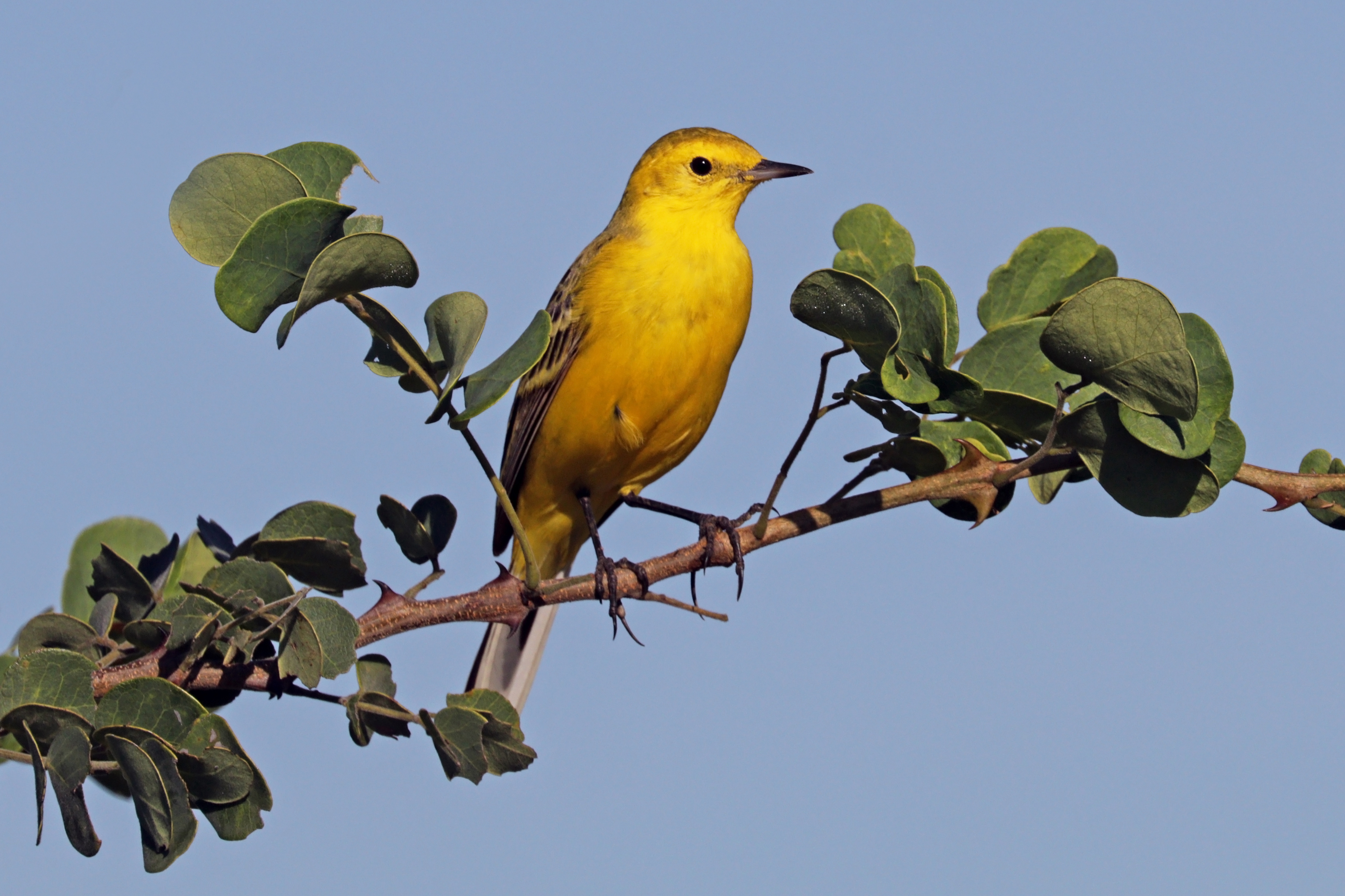
Male M. f. lutea, Matetsi Safari Area, Zimbabwe

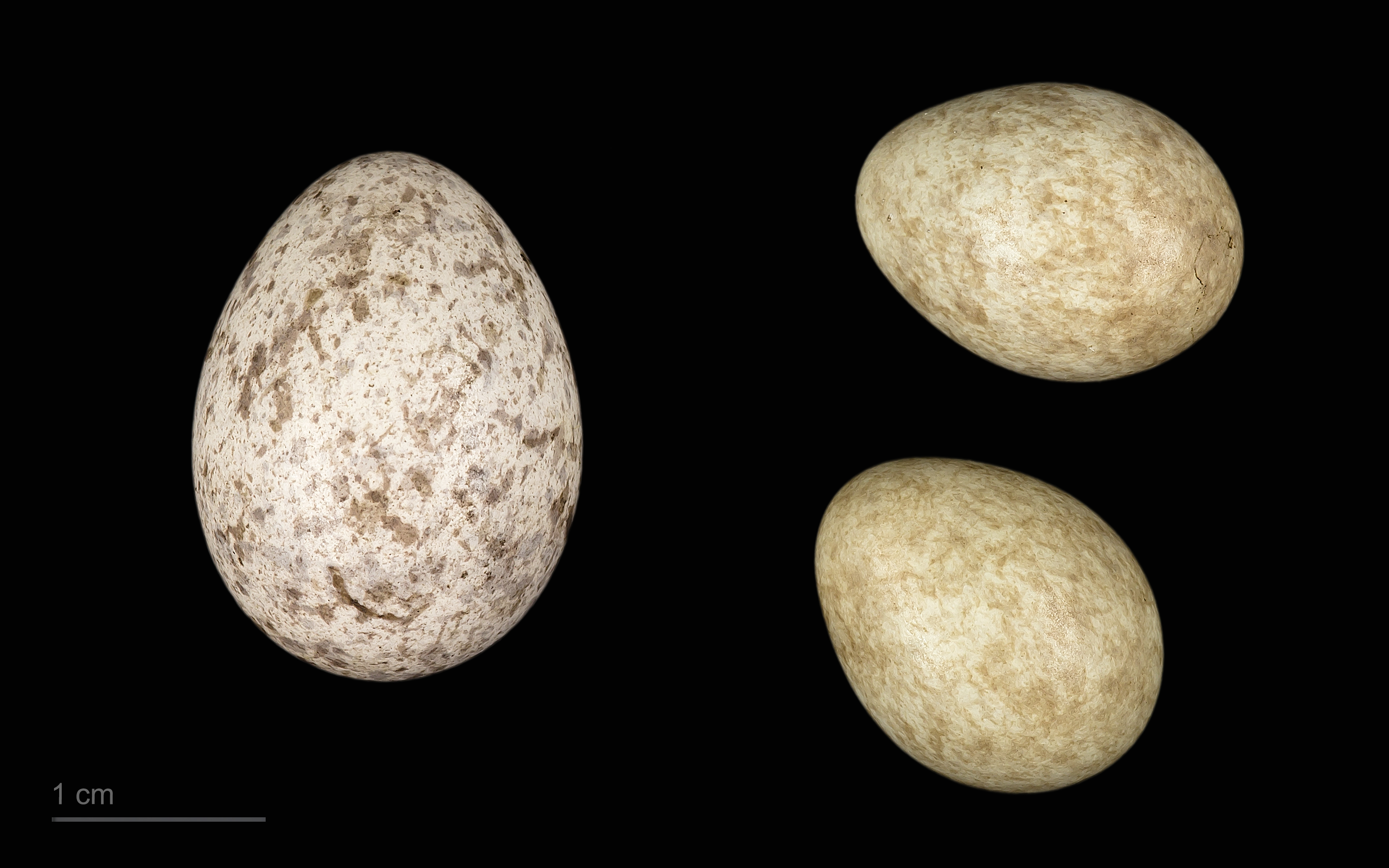
Cuculus canorus canorus egg in a clutch of Motacilla flava eggs - MHNT

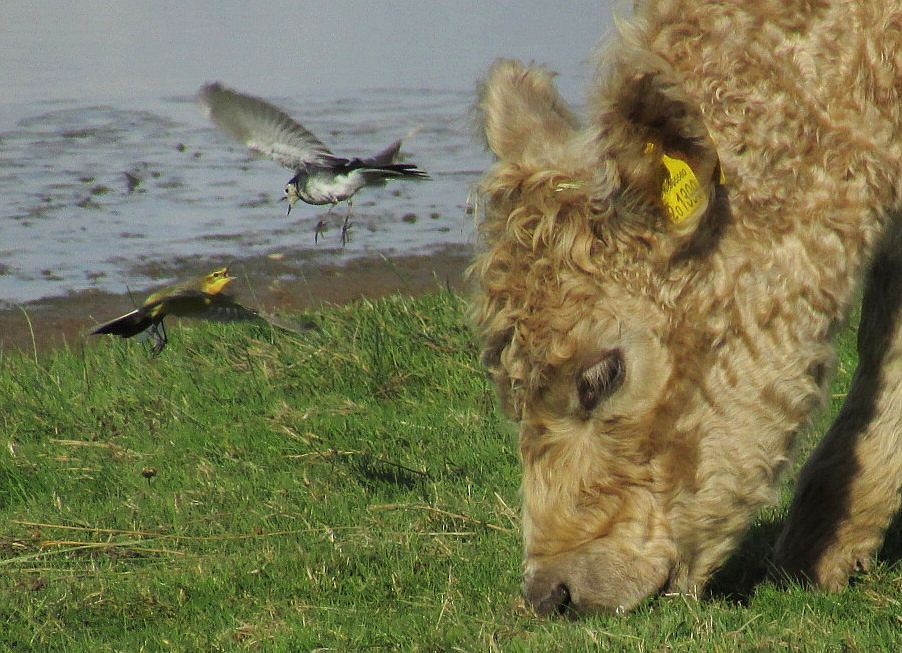
Male M. f. flavissima fighting with a male pied wagtail (M. a. yarrellii) at RSPB Bowling Green Marsh, Topsham, Devon

== Sources ==
- Voelker, Gary (2002). "Systematics and historical biogeography of wagtails: Dispersal versus vicariance revisited". Condor. 104 (4): 725–739. doi:10.1650/0010-5422(2002)104[0725:SAHBOW]2.0.CO;2. S2CID 85844839.
- Wiles, Gary J.; et al. (2000). "Noteworthy Bird Records for Micronesia, with a Summary of Raptor Sightings in the Mariana Islands, 1988-1999". Micronesica. 32 (2): 257–284.
