= Percy Kelly =

Percy Kelly may refer to

- Percy Kelly (artist) (1918-1993), English artist and footballer
- Percy R. Kelly (1870-1949), American lawyer and judge
