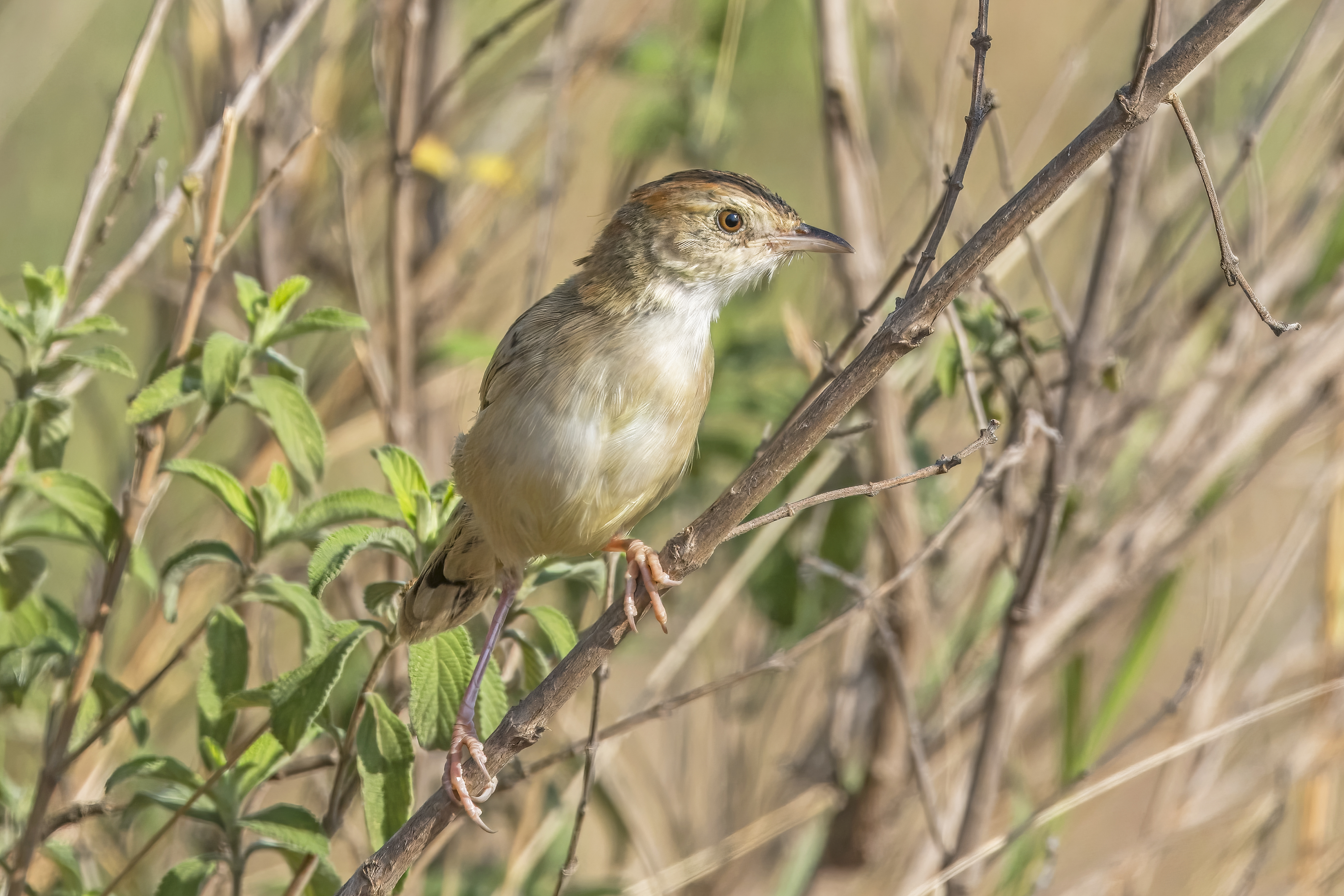
- C. c. victoria, Tanzania
- C. c. humilis song recorded in Kenya

Conservation status
- Least Concern (IUCN 3.1)

Scientific classification
- Kingdom: Animalia
- Phylum: Chordata
- Class: Aves
- Order: Passeriformes
- Family: Cisticolidae
- Genus: Cisticola
- Species: C. chiniana

Binomial name
- Cisticola chiniana (Smith, 1843)

= Rattling cisticola =

Species of bird

The rattling cisticola (Cisticola chiniana) is a species of bird in the family Cisticolidae which is native to Africa south of the equator, and parts of East Africa. It is a common to abundant species in open savanna and scrubland habitats, whether in arid, moist or upland regions. Especially during summer, it is highly conspicuous due to its strident and repetitive call-notes from prominent perches.

== Taxonomy ==
The rattling cisticola was formally described in 1843 by the Scottish zoologist Andrew Smith under the binomial name Drymoica chiniana based on a male specimen collected near the town of Zeerust in the North West Province of South Africa. The specific epithet chiniana is probably from the toponym "Chenyane" or Tshwenyane Mountains that lie to the north of Zeerust. The rattling cisticola is now one of 53 species placed in the genus Cisticola that was introduced in 1829 by the German naturalist Johann Jakob Kaup.

Seventeen subspecies are recognised:

- C. c. simplex (Heuglin, 1869) – south Sudan, northeast DR Congo and north Uganda
- C. c. fricki Mearns, 1913 – south Ethiopia and north Kenya
- C. c. fortis Lynes, 1930 – Gabon to central Angola, south DR Congo and Zambia
- C. c. humilis Madarász, G, 1904 – east Uganda and west Kenya
- C. c. fischeri Reichenow, 1891 – central north Tanzania
- C. c. ukamba Lynes, 1930 – central Kenya and north Tanzania
- C. c. victoria Lynes, 1930 – southwest Kenya and north Tanzania
- C. c. heterophrys Oberholser, 1906 – coastal Kenya and Tanzania
- C. c. keithi Parkes, 1987 – central south Tanzania
- C. c. mbeya Parkes, 1987 – south Tanzania
- C. c. emendatus Vincent, 1944 – Malawi, southeast Tanzania and north Mozambique
- C. c. procerus Peters, W, 1868 – east Zambia, south Malawi and central Mozambique
- C. c. frater Reichenow, 1916 – central Namibia
- C. c. bensoni Traylor, 1964 – south Zambia
- C. c. smithersi Hall, BP, 1956 – south Angola and north Namibia to west Zimbabwe
- C. c. chiniana (Smith, A, 1843) – southeast Botswana and Zimbabwe to central south Mozambique and central South Africa
- C. c. campestris Gould, 1845 – southeast Mozambique and east South Africa

== Distribution and habitat ==
It is found in Angola, Botswana, Burundi, Republic of the Congo, DRC, Eswatini, Ethiopia, Kenya, Malawi, Mozambique, Namibia, Somalia, South Africa, South Sudan, Tanzania, Uganda, Zambia, and Zimbabwe. Its natural habitat is arid, mesic or moist savannas and woodland, often dominated by thorn trees or thorn shrub (Dichrostachys, etc.). It is, however, also commonly found in miombo and mopane woodland, and is one of the commonest bird species on the Mozambican coastal plain. It is also present in the Eastern Highlands and the East African uplands below 2,000 m. In addition it utilizes some ecotones including edges of cultivation, fringes of dense woodland and woodland fringing the Okavango delta.

The tinkling cisticola replaces it in stunted broad-leaved woodland and dry deciduous woodland on sandy substrates, while various Cisticola species replace it in marshy situations. It co-occurs with various Prinia species.

== Behaviour ==
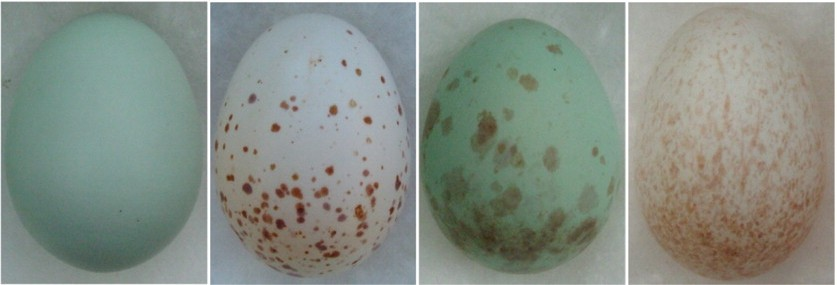
Series of eggs, showing variation in background colour and spotting

Especially in summer, much time is spent calling prominently from the top of a tree or bush. The strident call can be rendered as "chee-chee chichi-chirrrrr", but varies somewhat from individual to individual.

=== Breeding ===
Breeding occurs during the wet season in spring and summer. They build a ball-shaped nest of very coarse grass blades, which is lined on the inside with fine plant material.

== Gallery ==
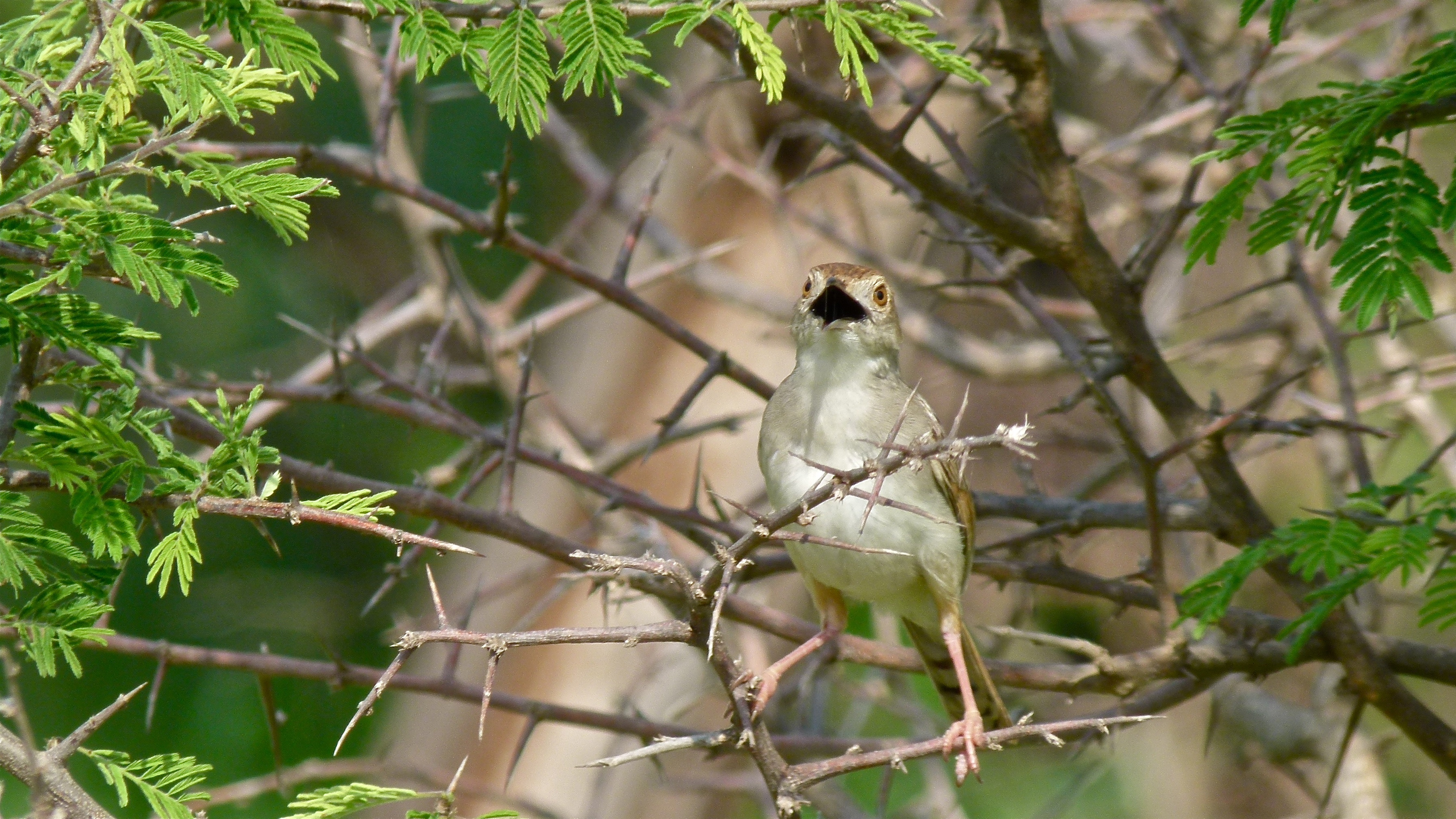
C. c. campestris in the Kruger National Park. The black gape is evident while singing.

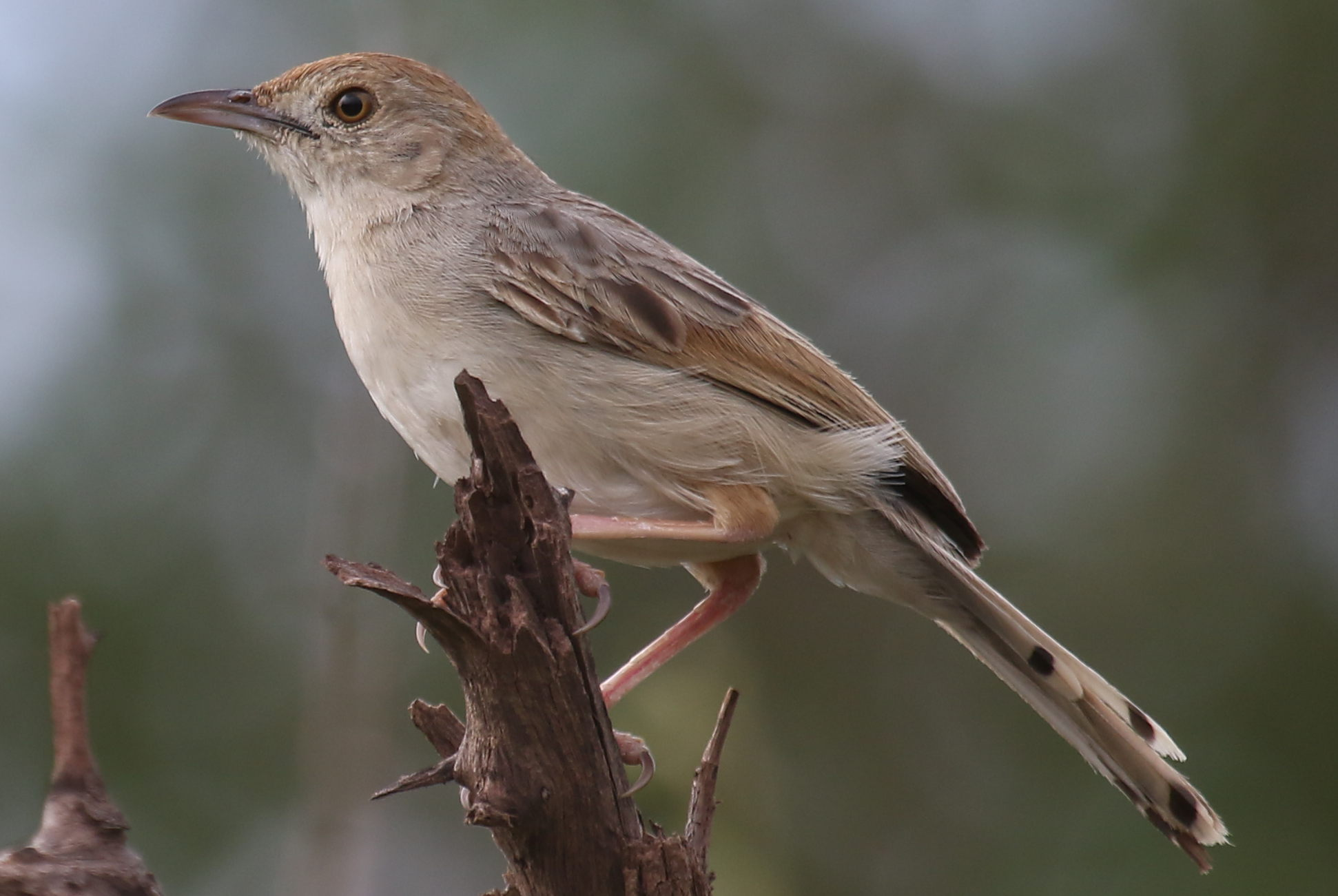
The nominate subspecies in Marakele National Park

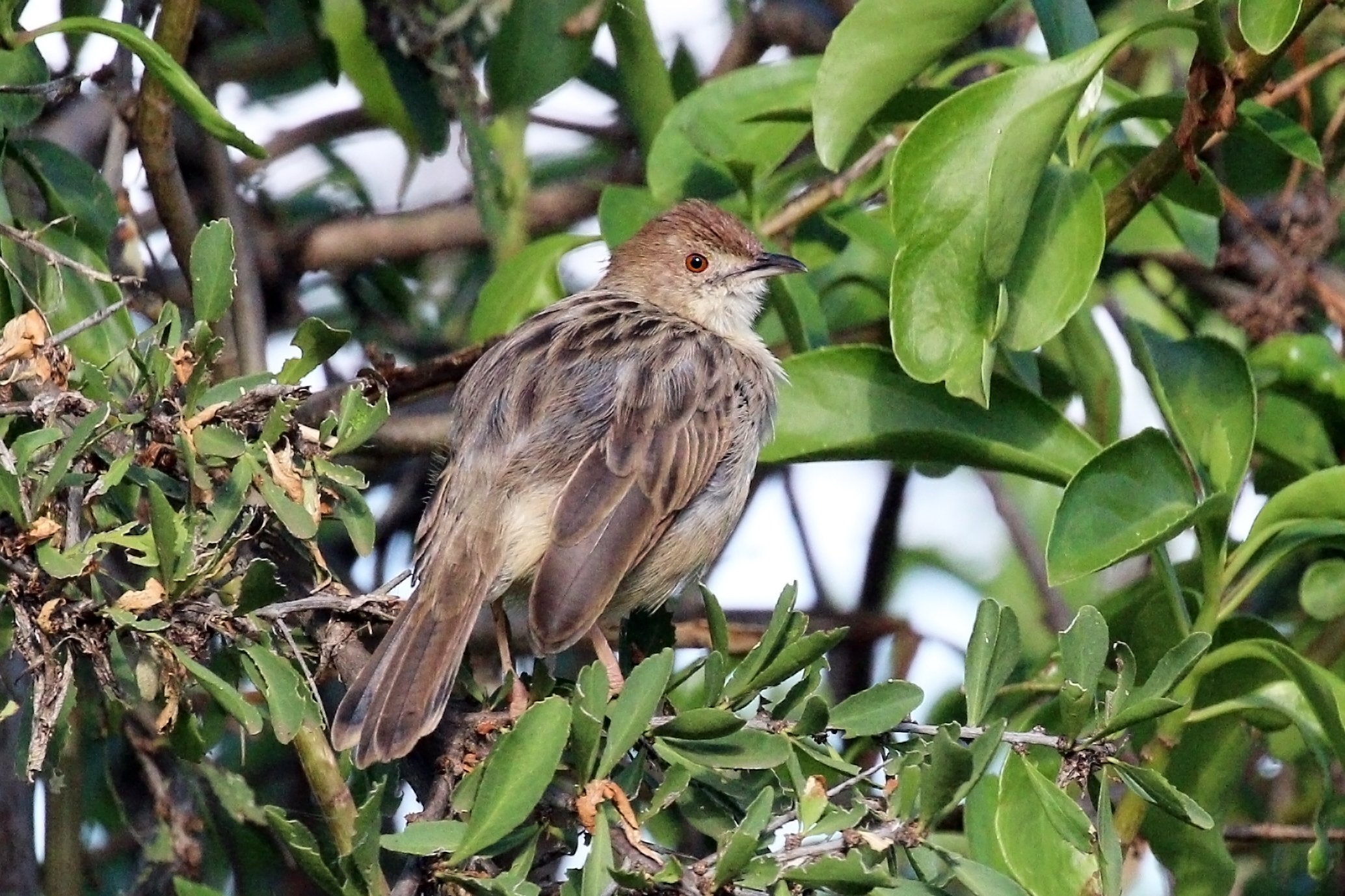
C. c. humilis, Soysambu Conservancy, Kenya

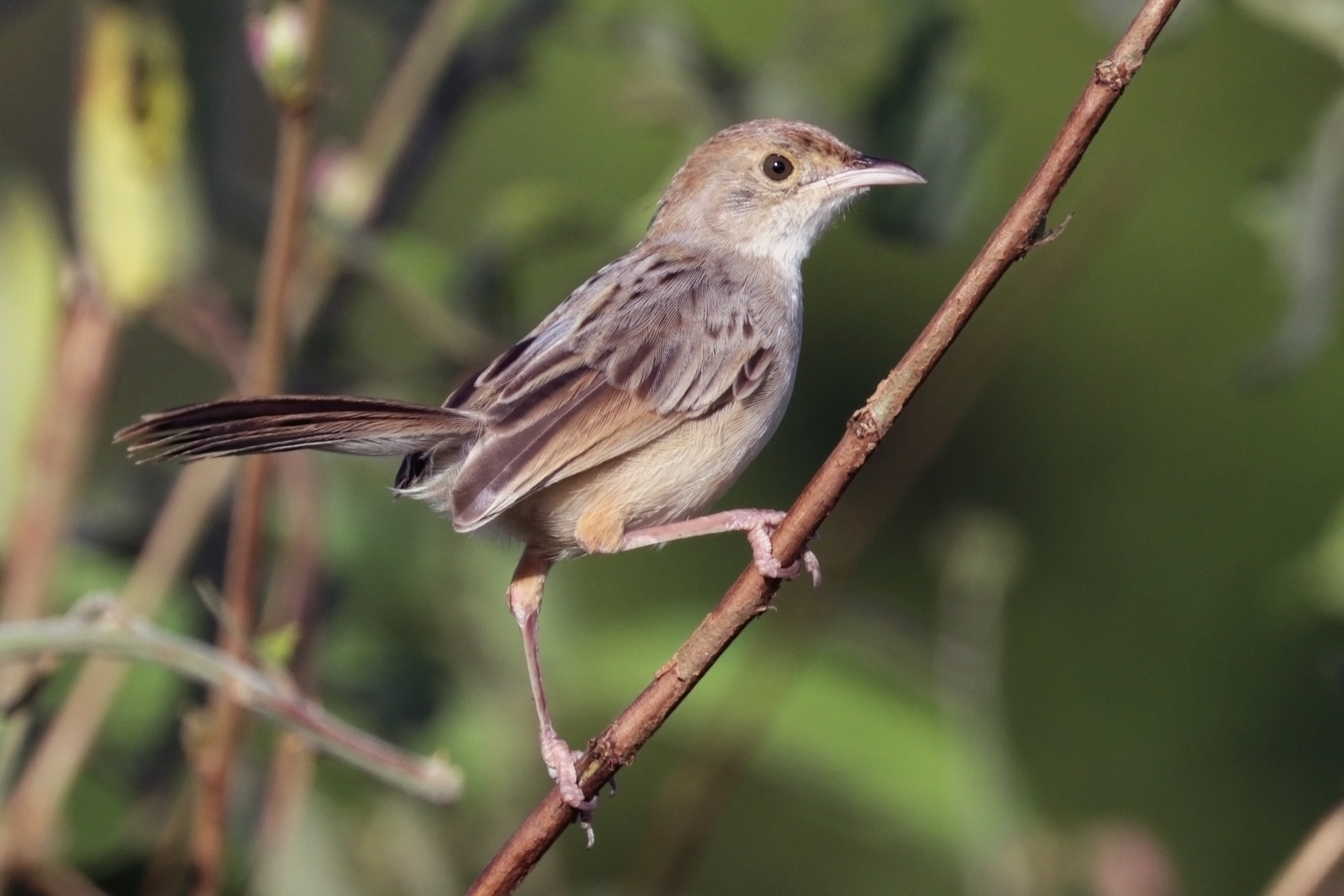
C. c. smithersi, Matetsi Safari Area, Zimbabwe

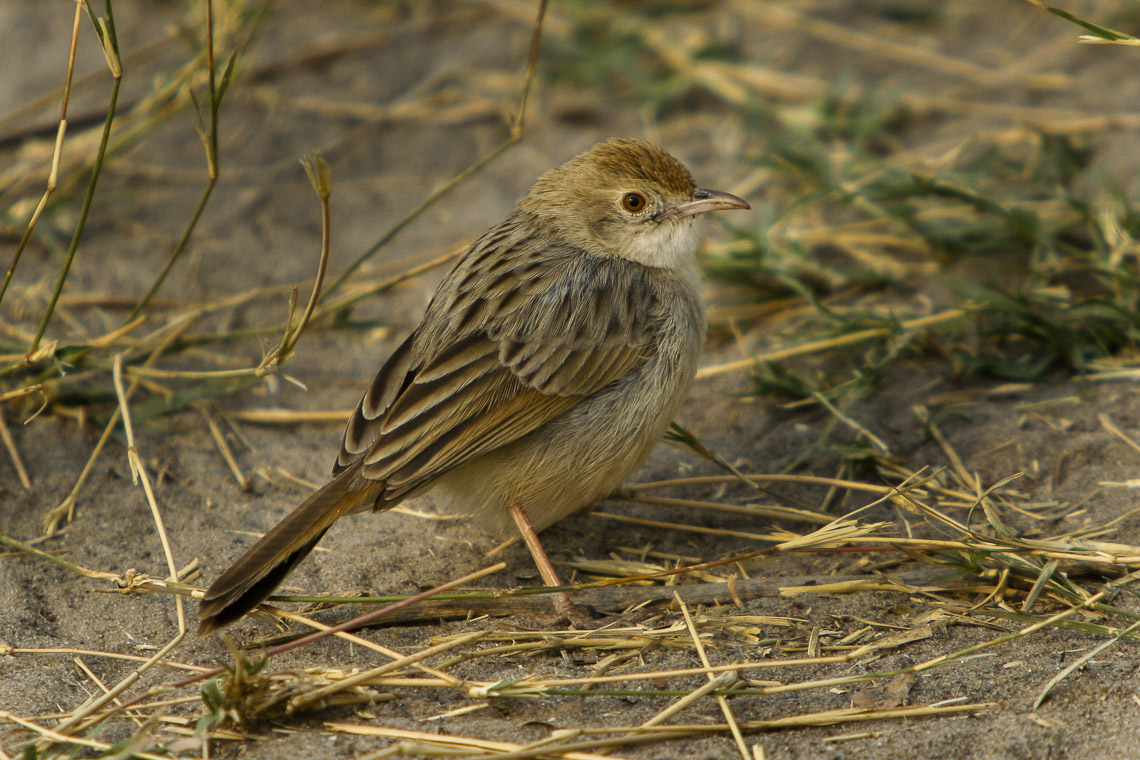
C. c. frater in Namibia
