= Fell Foodie =

British food influencer

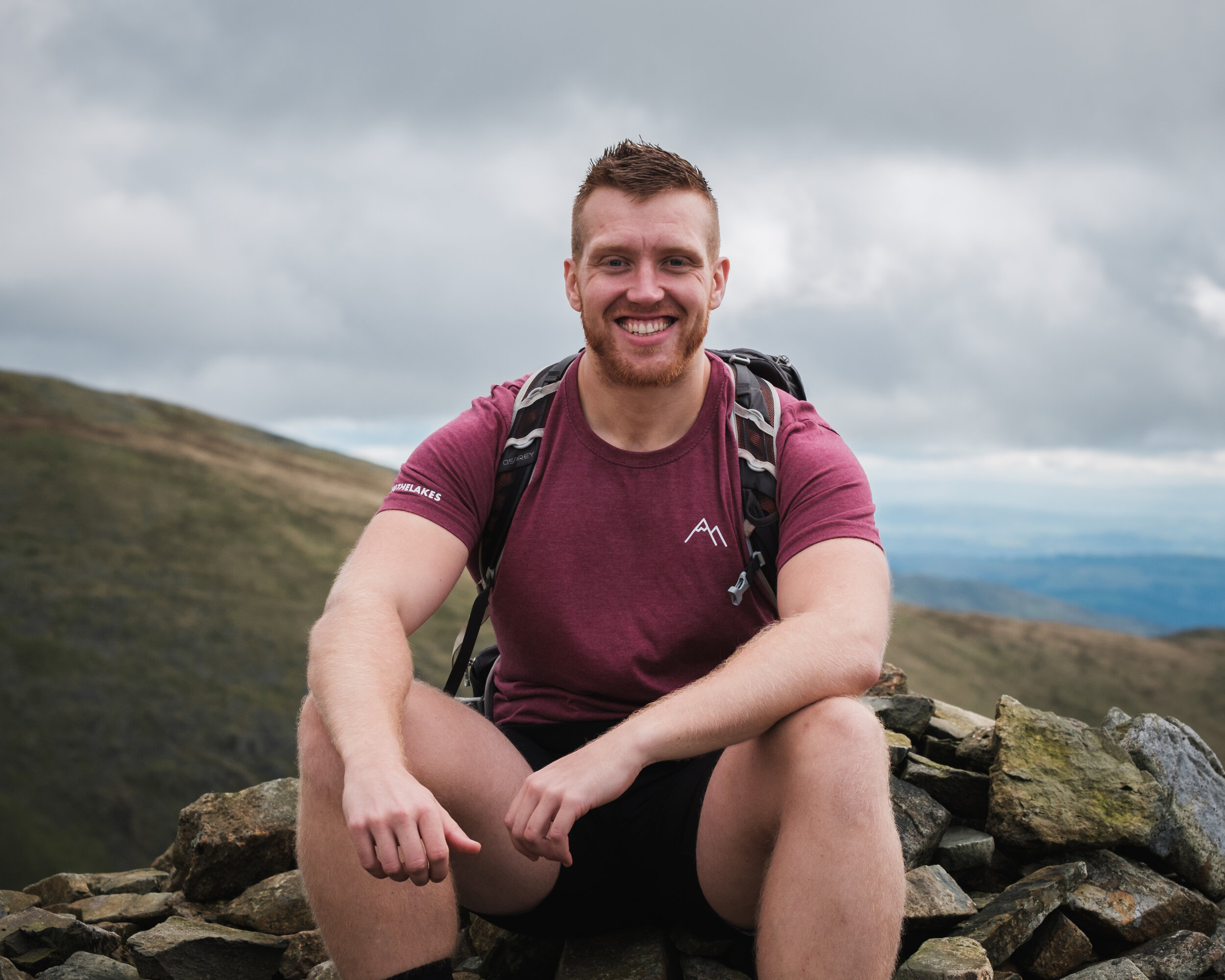
- Born: 8 October 1990 (age 35); Carlisle, England, United Kingdom
- Website: https://www.fellfoodie.co.uk/

Harrison Ward (born 8 October 1990), better known as Fell Foodie, is an English outdoor cook, mental health speaker, TV personality and author. He was born in Carlisle.

== Early and personal life ==
Ward was born 8 October 1990 in Carlisle. He was interested in cooking from a young age, and helped his grandmother in the kitchen as a child.

Ward began struggling with depression in his teenage years. Whilst living in York for university, he often found himself in the pub, drinking 20 pints a day and taking up smoking full time. In 2016, he moved back to Cumbria and began spending time outdoors in an effort to combat his alcoholism and depression.

== Career ==
Ward began gaining an audience in 2017, when he began posting on Instagram about fell-walking and his interest in food.

Ward has been featured on Mary Berry's Love to Cook programme on BBC 2.

In 2022, Ward was nominated for The Great Outdoors Awards in the category Outdoor Personality Of The Year.

In October 2023, Ward released his first book, Cook Out, which features outdoor cooking recipes. It was longlisted for the 2024 Lakeland Book of the Year.

== Personal life ==
As of 2019, Ward lives in Ambleside.
