= Zholia Alemi =

British fraudster and bogus doctor

- Born: 1962 (age 63–64); Iran
- Education: University of Auckland
- Known for: Convicted of defrauding the National Health Service (NHS) by posing as a doctor

Zholia Alemi (born 1962) is a convicted fraudster who posed as a doctor for over twenty years in the United Kingdom. In February 2023 she was convicted of defrauding the National Health Service (NHS) of more than £1 million and sentenced to seven years in prison. She had previously received a five-year prison sentence for forging the will of an elderly patient.

== Early life and studies ==
Alemi was born in Iran in 1962. She studied at the University of Auckland in New Zealand, obtaining a Bachelor's degree in human biology in 1992. She then enrolled on a medical degree course. She passed her first-year exams at the second attempt but then failed her second-year exams and was not allowed to continue on the course. She left without a medical qualification.

== Career as a fake doctor ==
In 1995, Alemi moved to the United Kingdom and applied to the General Medical Council (GMC) to register as a doctor. She forged a degree certificate and a letter of verification from the University of Auckland to support her application. Her credentials were not checked and she was granted a provisional registration by the GMC. Following a year spent working in two hospitals in Northern Ireland, she was granted a full registration in 1997. Over the next twenty years she worked as a psychiatrist for the NHS in a number of NHS trusts across the UK, often as a locum doctor.

Alemi became a member of the Royal College of Psychiatrists in 2003, passing part one of their exams after four attempts and part two after three attempts. In 2012 the Royal College of Psychiatrists recommended her for entry to the GMC specialist register in psychiatry with learning disability, enabling her to apply for consultant posts. The GMC received a number of complaints about Alemi during her career as a psychiatrist, relating to her behaviour towards patients and colleagues, prescribing, and dishonesty. She was over the years given formal advice and a warning, and had conditions imposed on her practice. In July 2017 she received a twelve-month suspension from the medical register, which was renewed in August 2018.

== 2018 trial ==
In October 2018, Alemi was convicted of stealing from a vulnerable elderly patient while working in Cumbria and forging a will to make herself and her grandchildren beneficiaries of the wealthy widow's estate. She was sentenced to five years in prison. At this stage no-one had checked her credentials and realised that she was not qualified to practise as a doctor. It was a journalist, Phil Coleman, on a regional newspaper, the News and Star, who contacted the University of Auckland and discovered that Alemi had not qualified as a doctor. As a result of this discovery, Alemi had her name removed from the medical register by the GMC. The GMC also checked the registration of some 3,000 doctors who had registered under the same route as Alemi, whereby doctors from some Commonwealth countries could, until 2003, bypass the usual requirement for foreign doctors to be tested on their medical and language skills before being allowed to practise in the UK.

The discovery that Alemi's medical qualification had been faked led to further police investigations that extended over England, Scotland, Wales and Northern Ireland and also included enquiries made in New Zealand, Pakistan and the United States. In August 2020 Alemi was charged with a number of offences relating to fraud.

== 2023 trial ==
In January 2023 Alemi went on trial at Manchester Crown Court, accused of 20 offences including forgery and fraud. During the four-week trial, the court heard that Alemi had used her forged degree certificate to be paid between £1 million and £1.3 million by the NHS. On 15 February 2023 the jury found her guilty on 13 counts of fraud, three counts of obtaining a pecuniary advantage by deception, two counts of forgery and two counts of using a false instrument. Judge Hilary Manley remanded her into custody and told her to expect a substantial prison sentence. The judge added that she wanted to know "how it was this defendant was able to practise as long as she was, in so many positions". The Crown Prosecution Service (CPS) said that it would pursue confiscation proceedings against Alemi to recover criminal property.

On 28 February 2023 Alemi, who claims to have autism, despite there been no formal diagnosis, was sentenced to seven years in prison. The judge described Alemi as "highly manipulative and cunning", and expressed concern that she was able to detain patients against their will and prescribe powerful and dangerous drugs. The judge was also critical of the GMC and called for a thorough and open inquiry into why they had not uncovered her fraud.
