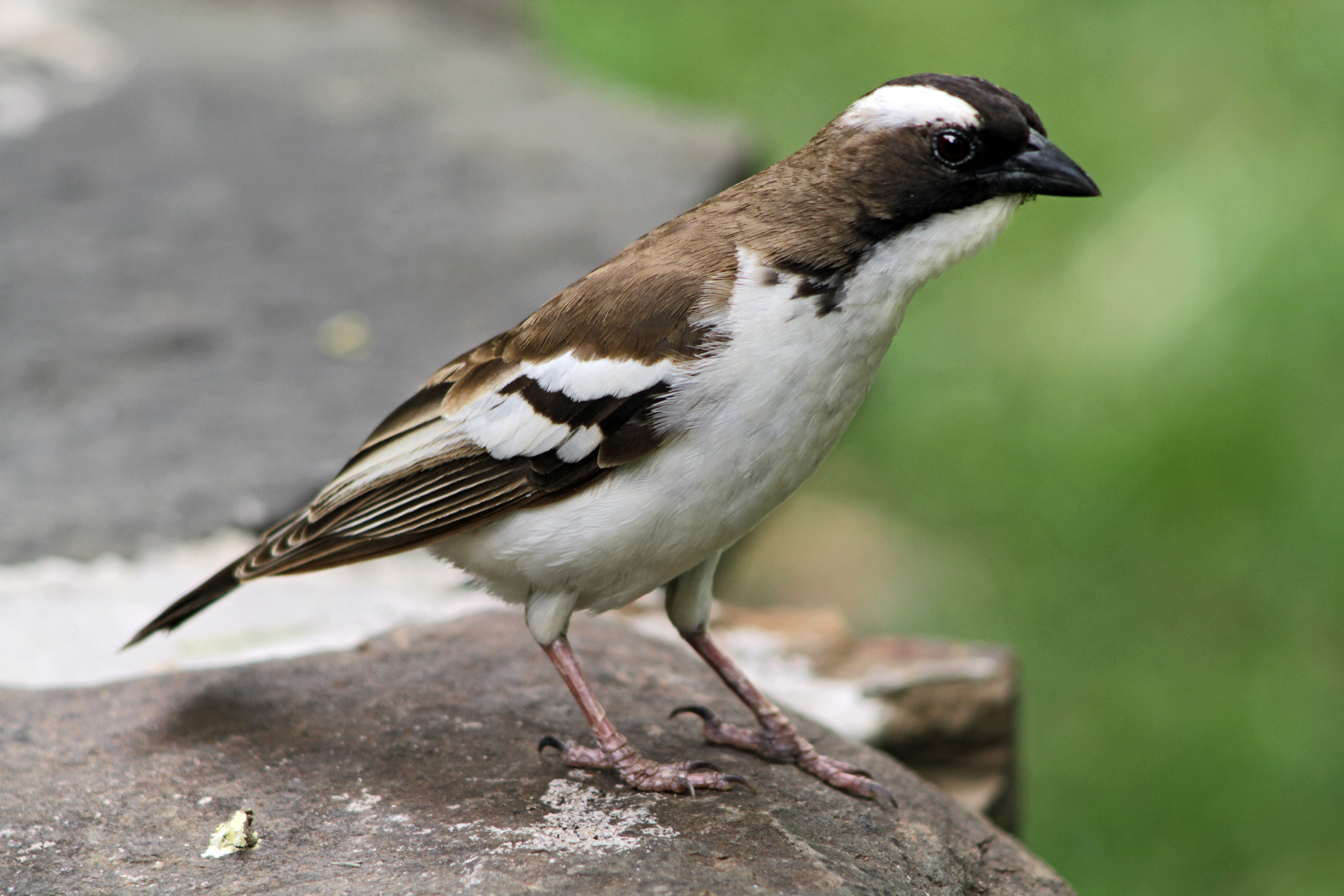
- A male of the tropical subspecies P. m. melanorhynchus, Lake Baringo, Kenya

Conservation status
- Least Concern (IUCN 3.1)

Scientific classification
- Kingdom: Animalia
- Phylum: Chordata
- Class: Aves
- Order: Passeriformes
- Family: Ploceidae
- Genus: Plocepasser
- Species: P. mahali

Binomial name
- Plocepasser mahali Smith, 1836

Audio
- Song recorded in southwest Kenya

= White-browed sparrow-weaver =

Species of bird

The white-browed sparrow-weaver (Plocepasser mahali) is a predominantly brown, sparrow-sized bird found throughout central and north-central southern Africa. It is found in groups of two to eleven individuals consisting of one breeding pair and other non-reproductive individuals.

== Taxonomy and systematics ==
During his expedition to the interior of southern Africa in 1834–35, Andrew Smith collected specimens of the white-browed sparrow weaver at the Modder River, which he described in 1836, giving it the scientific name Plocepasser mahali.

=== Etymology ===
Smith did not provide an explanation for the species epithet mahali, but is clear it is not a Latin name. Probably it is derived from the vernacular name for the bird in Setswana mogale or from the Sesotho word mohale, a brave or fierce person, which suggests the bird's name may refer to its angry scolding.

=== Vernacular names ===
Other common names used in English include black-billed mahali weaverbird, black-billed sparrow weaver, Kismayu sparrow-weaver, stripe-breasted sparrow-weaver, white-browed weaver bird, and white-crowned weaver bird. In Kikamba it's called ngõsõ. In Tugen, spoken by the Tugen subtribe of the Kalenjin, it's known as the kamatiryos or Chematiryos

=== Subspecies ===
There are four recognized subspecies of the white-browed sparrow-weaver:

- P. m. melanorhynchus is found in eastern Africa
- P. m. pectoralis is found from Botswana to Tanzania and western Mozambique
- P. m. ansorgei is found in southern Angola and northern Namibia
- P. m. mahali is found from southern Namibia to Zimbabwe and South Africa

== Description ==
It ranges from 17 to 19 cm (6.7 to 7.5 in) in length and is characterized by a broad, white eyebrow stripe and white rump visible in flight. While the male white-browed sparrow-weaver sports a black bill, the female's bill is horn-colored (light gray); that of the juvenile is pinkish-brown. In Zimbabwe, the white-browed sparrow-weaver shows faint brown spotting across its white breast.

=== Voice ===
The white-browed sparrow-weaver may emit either a brief chik-chick or a loud, fluid, cheoop-preeoo-chop whistle.

=== Similar species ===
The yellow-throated petronia has a pinkish brown (not black) bill, a buff (not white) eyebrow stripe, black (not pink) feet, and yellow shading at the bottom of a white throat. Additionally, the white-browed sparrow-weaver is larger than the yellow-throated petronia. Unlike the white-browed sparrow-weaver, the yellow-throated petronia may be found in broad-leaved woodland.

== Distribution and habitat ==
The white-browed sparrow-weaver is found in greatest numbers in north-central southern Africa. While this species most densely populates dry regions with woodland or wooded grassland at northern South Africa, its range includes Botswana, northern and central Namibia, and western Zimbabwe. It is seen very often in South Luangwa National Park, Zambia and southern Malawi. Populations may be found as far north as Ethiopia. Populations are sedentary.

This species nests in colonies along thornveld and scrubby, dry riverbanks.

== Behaviour and ecology ==
=== Breeding ===
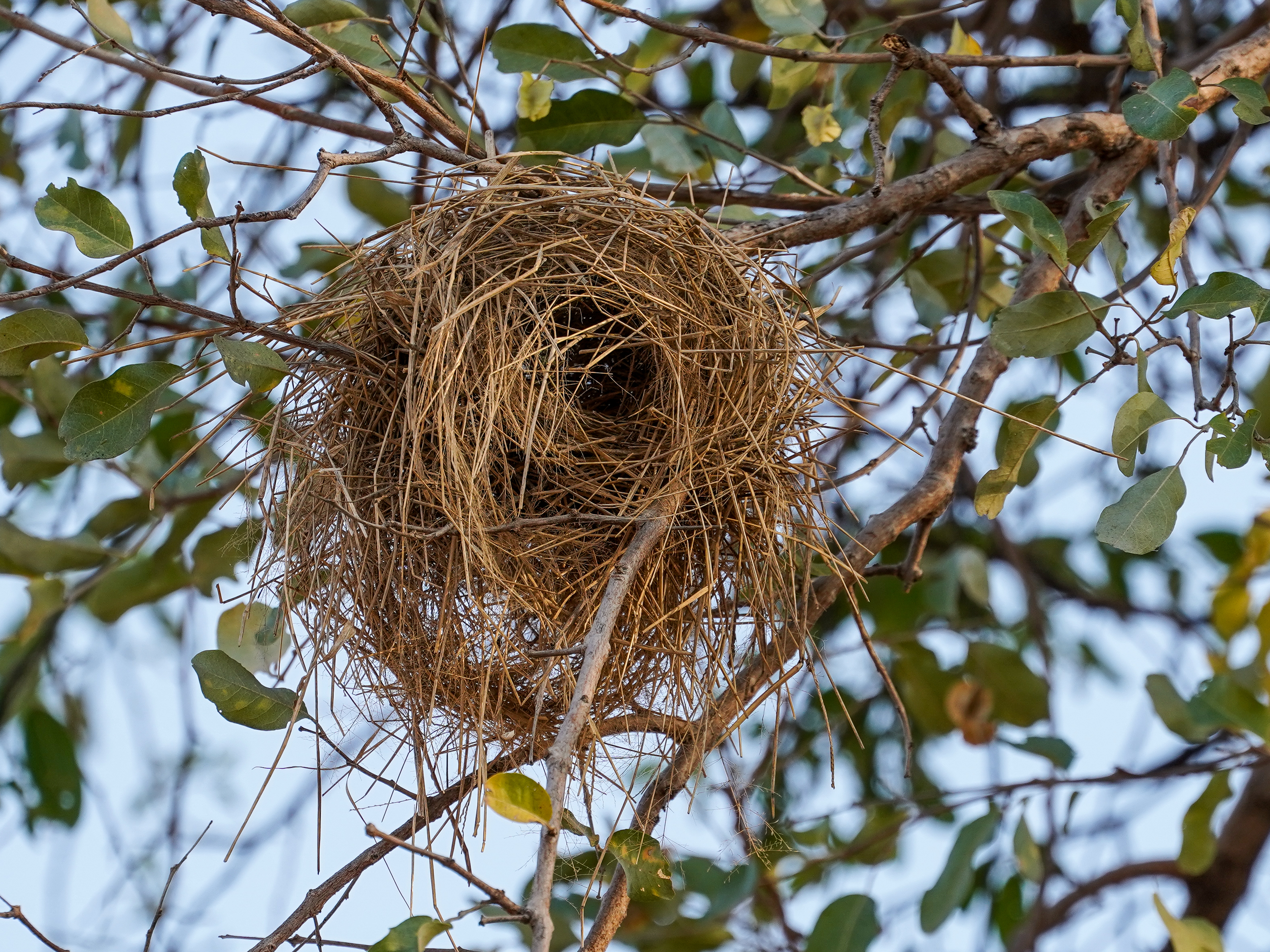
Nest of P. m. pectoralis in South Luangwa National Park, Zambia

Breeding has been observed year round, but occurs mainly in warmer months. Year round, groups of the white-browed sparrow-weaver are active and nest-building. Groups of ten to sixty inverted-U-shaped nests of dry grass appear in the outside limbs of trees, although only several are used for breeding or roosting. While breeding nests have only one entrance, roosting nests have an entrance located at each of the two nest extremities. The construction of these nests shows cultural variations. Research has shown that, throughout a region, nests are located at the leeward side of a tree. This behavior preserves a greater number of intact nests for breeding and roosting. White-browed sparrow-weaver nests are sometimes used by other birds, such as the red-headed finch and ashy tit.

=== Thermoregulation ===
Different populations of this species vary in their ability to regulate their body temperature when there are changes in air temperature. White-browed sparrow-weavers from hotter and drier parts of the desert maintained higher body temperatures and let their bodies heat up comparatively more during the warmest part of the day compared to birds from a milder semi-desert site. This daily heterothermy means that desert birds do not need to use as much evaporative cooling and therefore can conserve body water. Within the population of semi-desert birds, there were also seasonal changes in daily heterothermy, with higher heterothermy during the dry season compared to the wet season. When air temperatures are very high, white-browed sparrow weavers also spend less time foraging in direct sunlight and more time in shaded areas.

== Status ==
The white-browed sparrow-weaver is becoming more abundant, expanding its range on southern, northern, and eastern fronts.

== Gallery ==
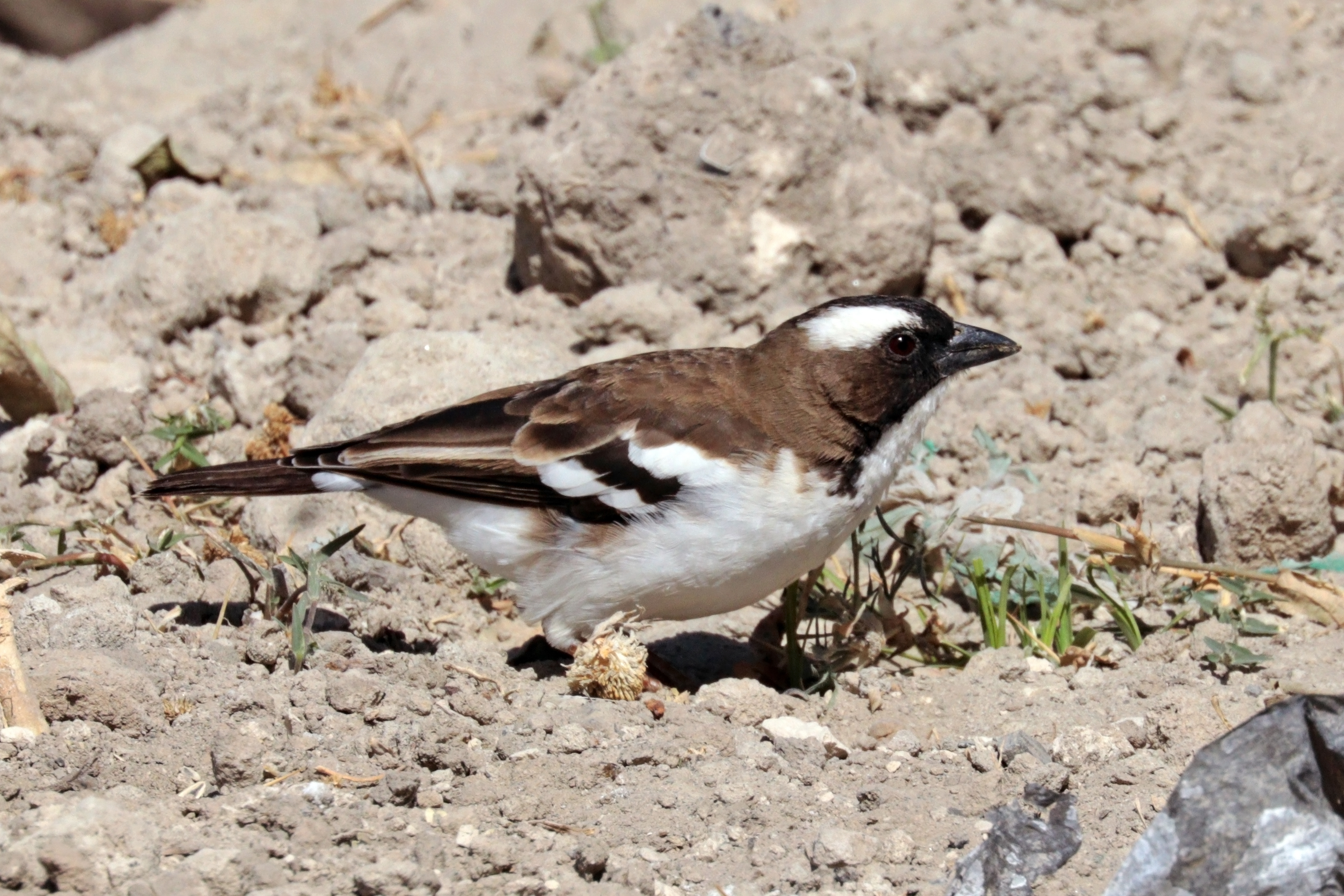
male
P. m. melanorhynchus
Lake Ziway, Ethiopia

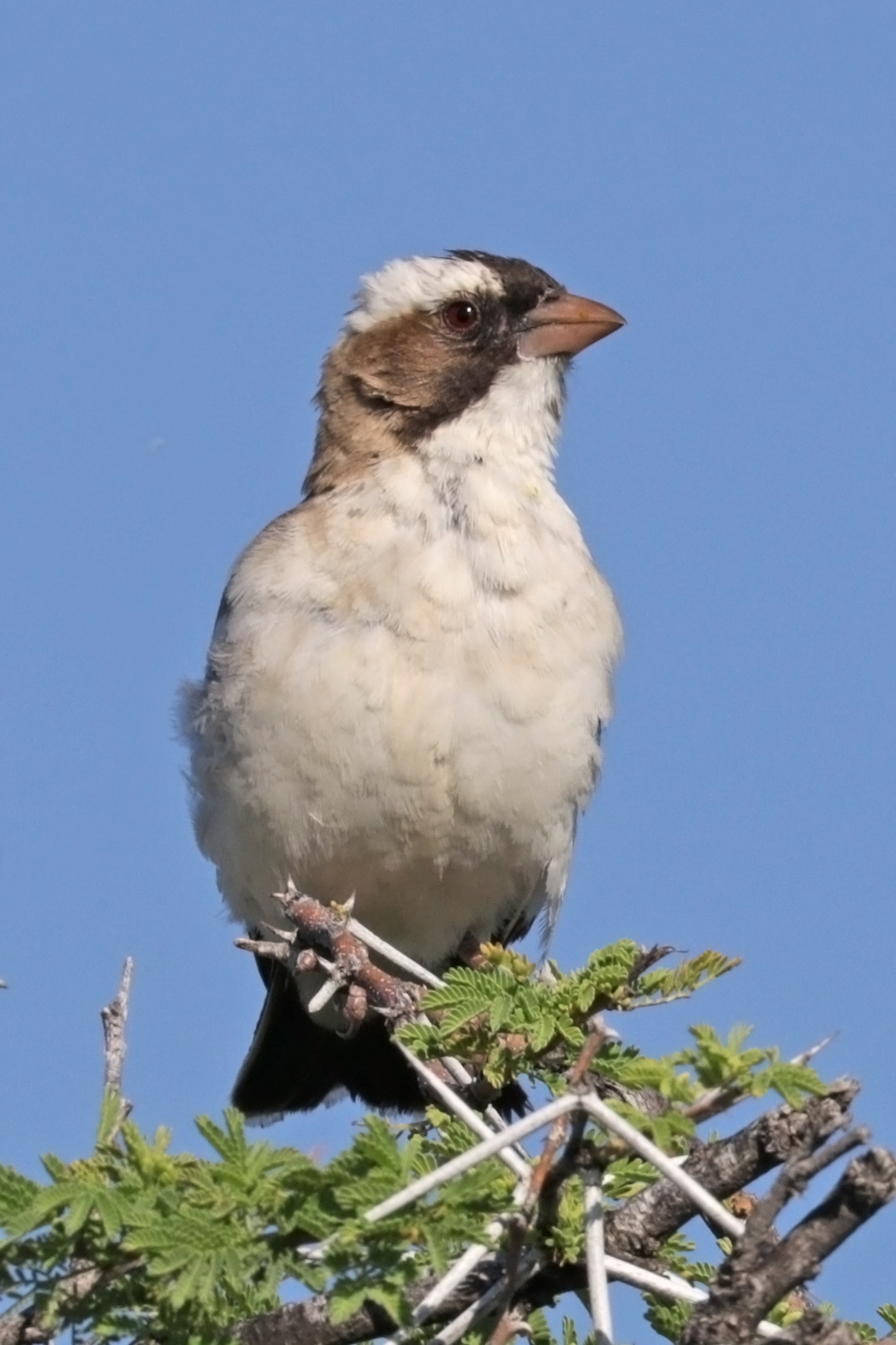
female
P. m. ansorgei
Etosha National Park, Namibia

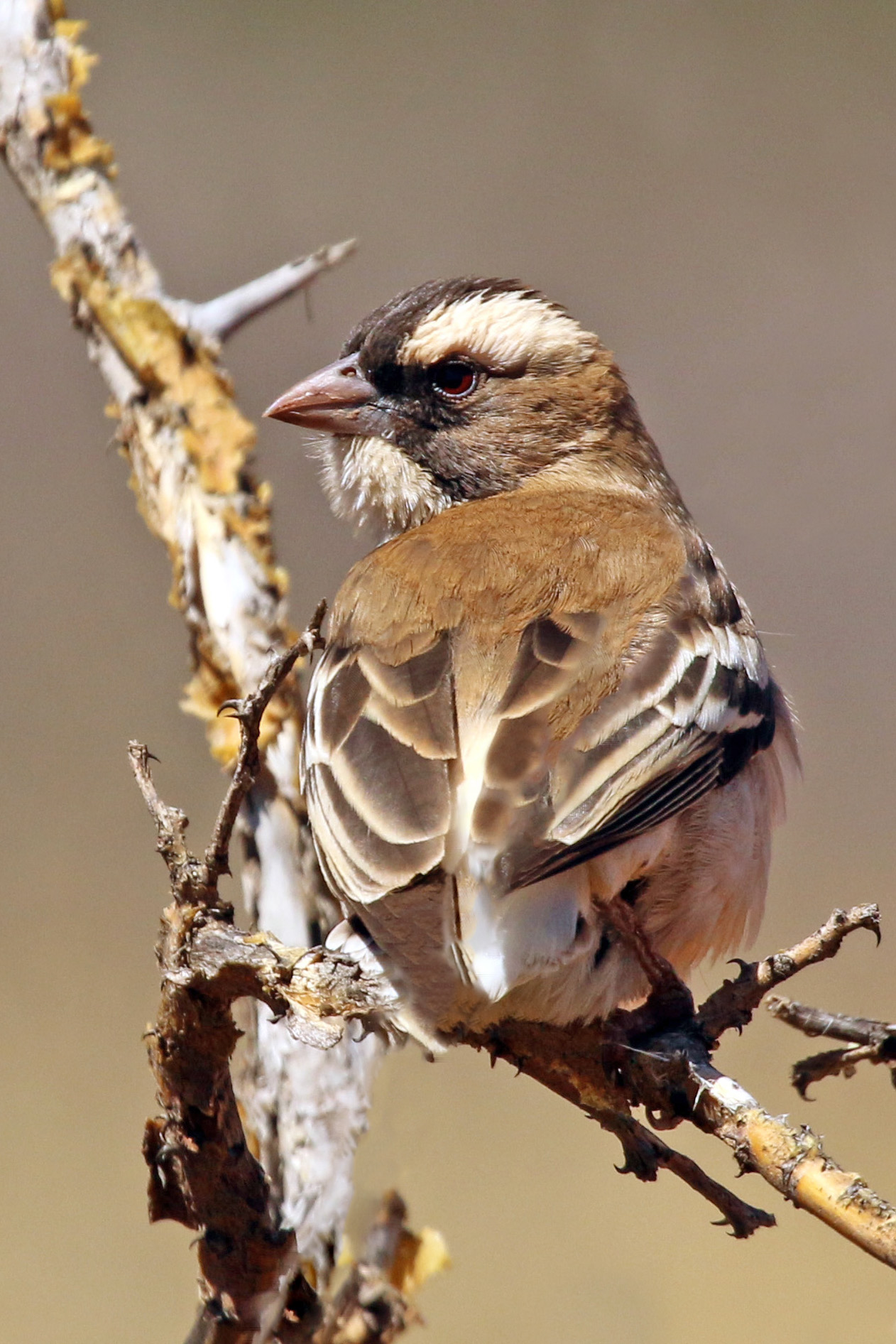
female
P. m. mahali
Tswalu Kalahari Reserve, South Africa

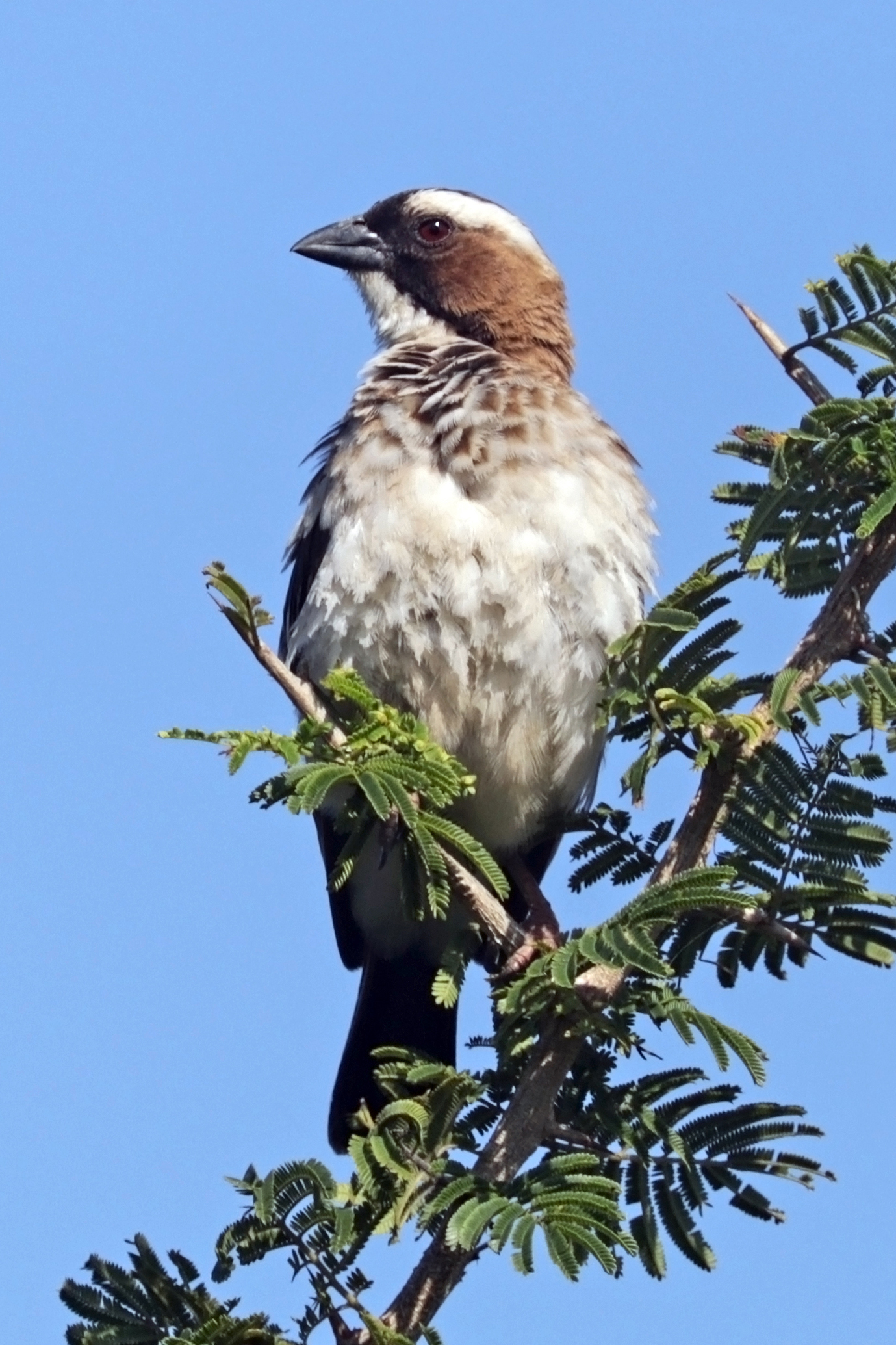
male
P. m. pectoralis
Matetsi Safari Area, Zimbabwe

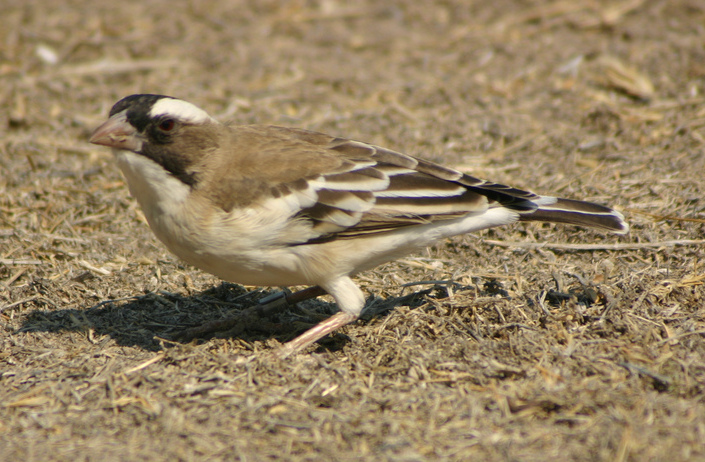
Juvenile in Namibia

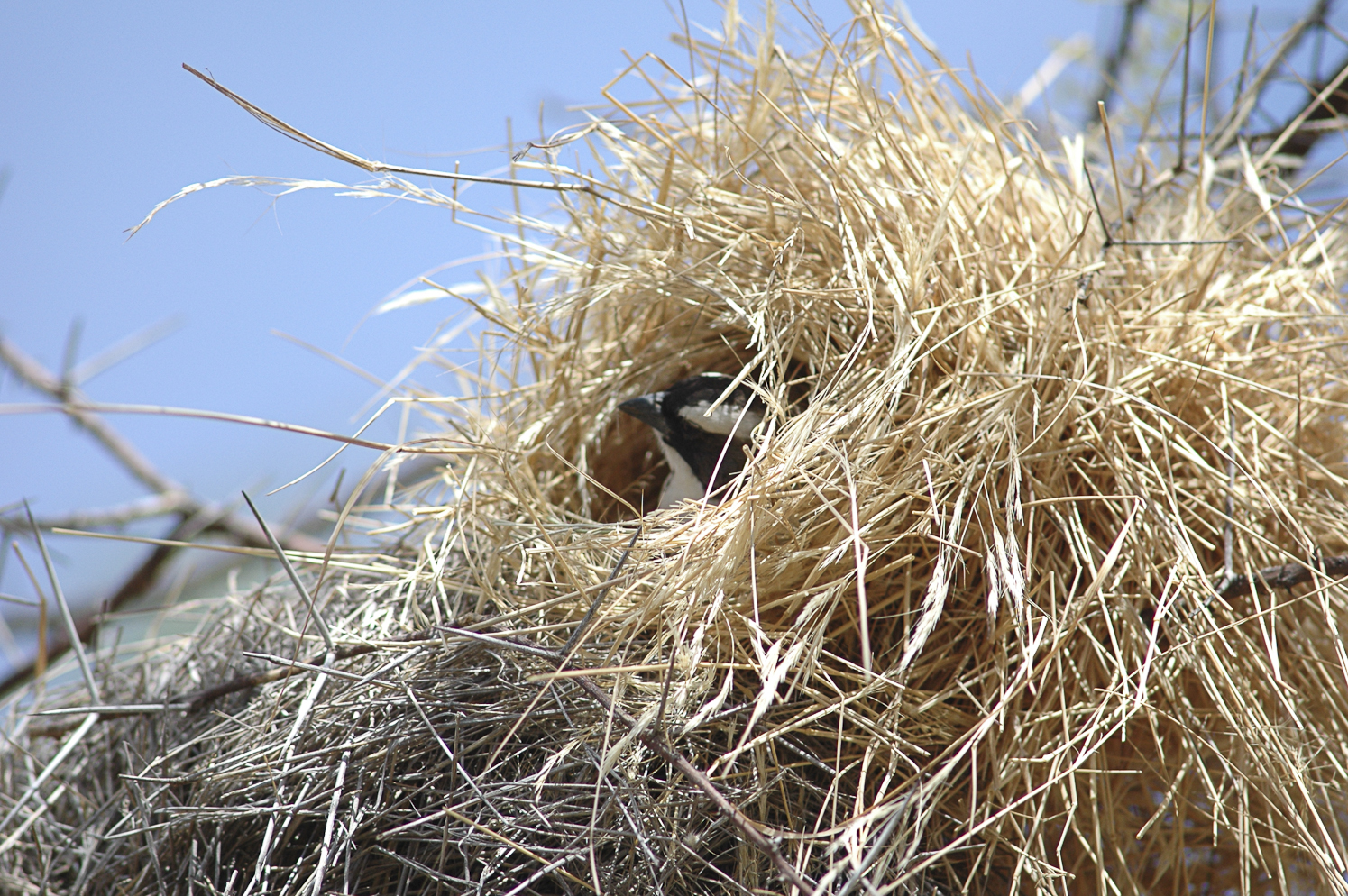
P. m. melanorhynchus, male in nest entrance, Kenya

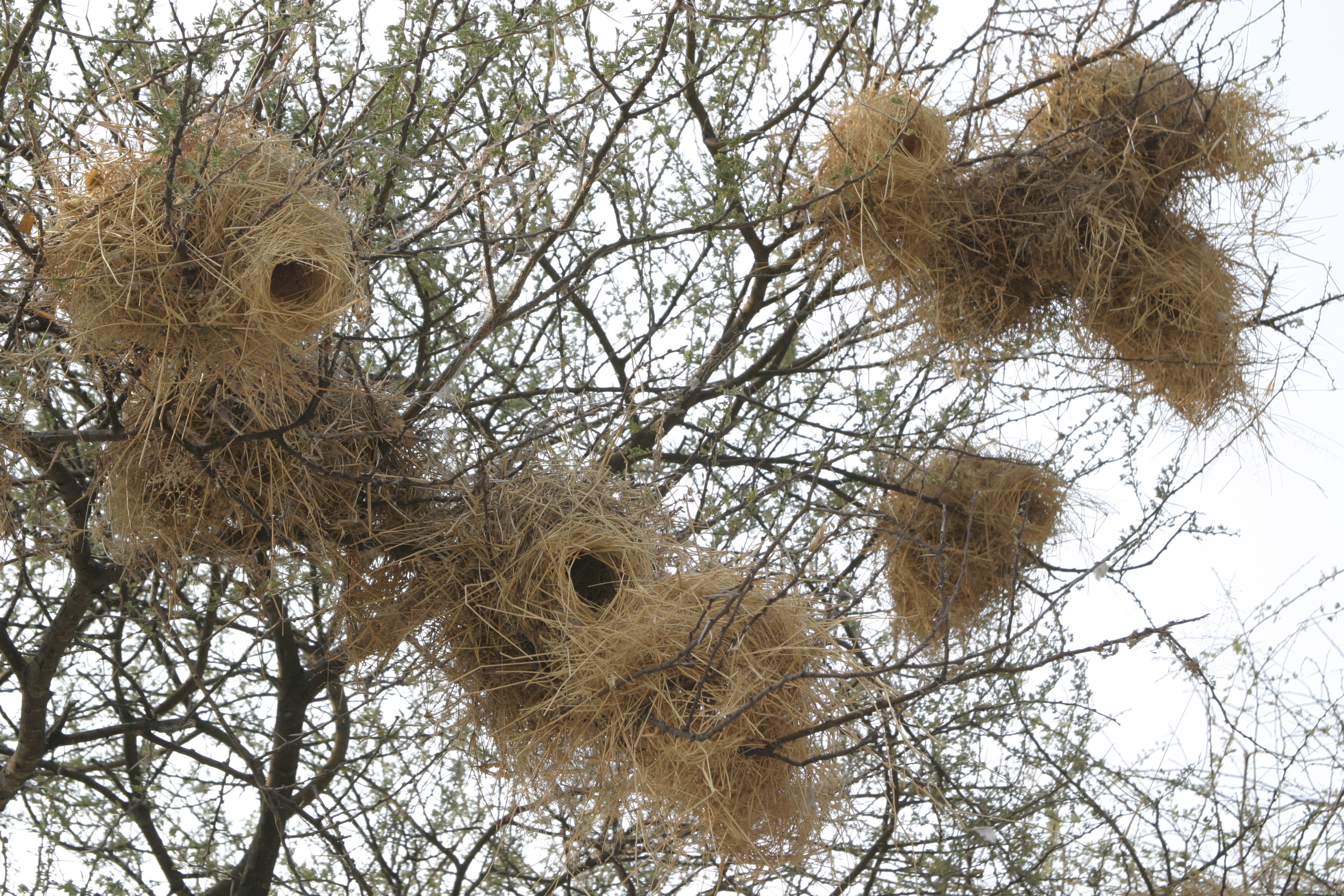
Nests in an acacia tree, Botswana

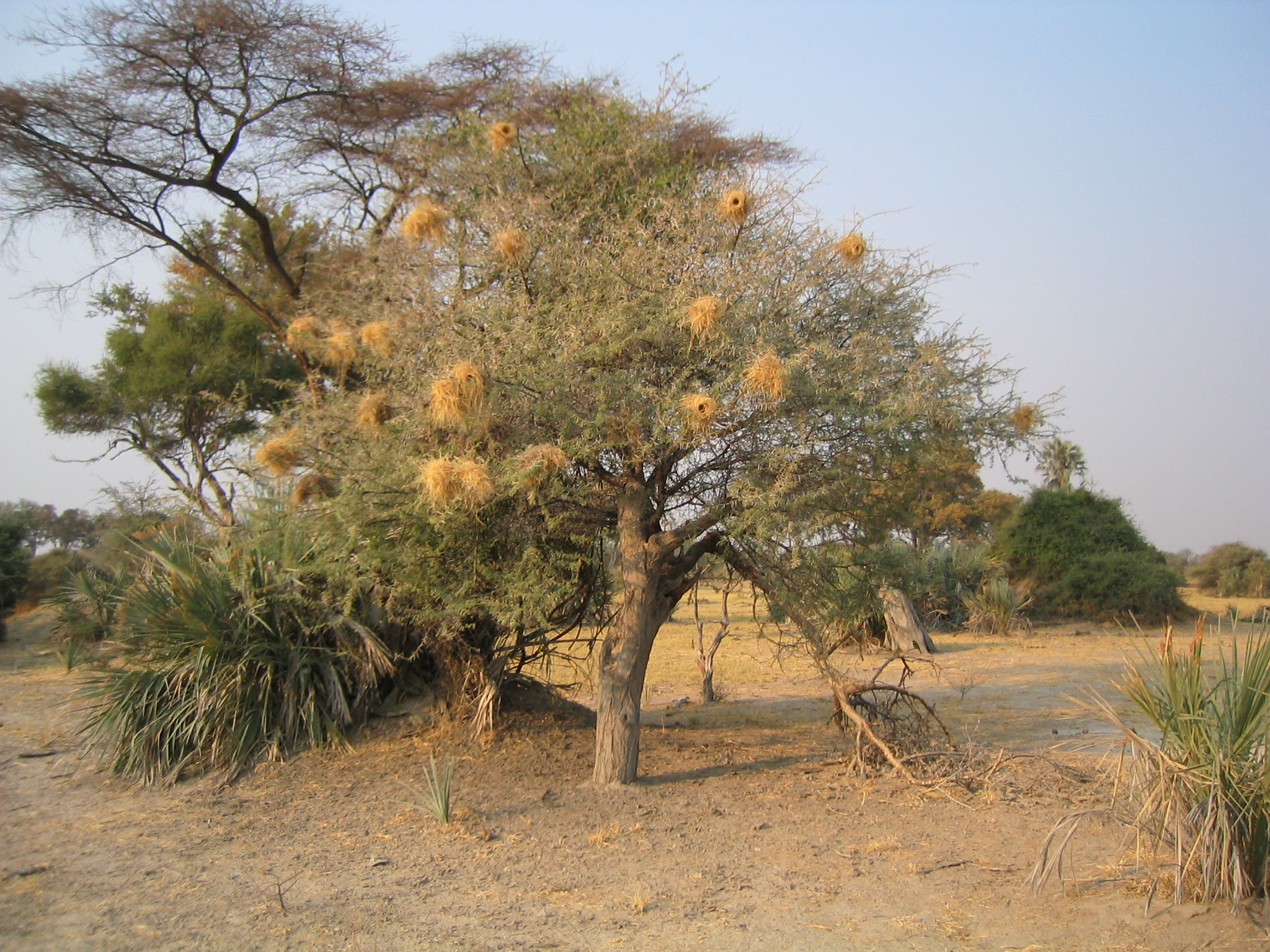
Over a dozen nests in an acacia tree, Okavango Delta, Botswana
