= Christopher Steel =

Christopher Steel(e) or Chris Steel(e) may refer to:

- Christopher Steel (composer) (1938–1991), British composer
- Christopher Steel (diplomat) (1903–1973), British diplomat who was permanent representative to NATO and ambassador to West Germany
- Chris Steel (born 1986), Australian politician
- Chris Steele (musician), bass player
- Chris Steele (doctor) (born 1945), resident health expert on the UK TV show This Morning
- Christopher Steele (born 1964), British private intelligence consultant and MI6 officer
- Christopher Steele (artist) (1733–1768), English painter

== See also ==
- Chris Steele-Perkins (born 1947), photographer
