= Mary Burkett =

English author and arts administrator

Mary Elizabeth Burkett OBE (1924-2014) was an English supporter of the arts, especially in Cumbria, the director of the Abbot Hall Art Gallery from 1966 to 1986, and an expert on felt-making.

== Early life and education ==
Burkett was born 7 October 1924 in Newcastle upon Tyne, to Alice (nee Gaussen), a violinist, and Ridley Burkett, a watchmaker and repairer. She attended Whickham School, gained a BA and teaching qualification at St Hild's College, University of Durham, and moved down to London to work in teaching. In 1954 she moved to Cumbria as Arts and Craft Lecturer at Charlotte Mason College, Ambleside, but gave up this job in 1962 to spend seven months travelling in Turkey and Iran with her friend Genette Malet de Carteret. They co-wrote an account of this trip, The Beckoning East: A journey through Turkey and Persia in 1962 in 2006. It was on this trip that Burkett first developed an interest in felt and feltmaking.

== Abbot Hall ==
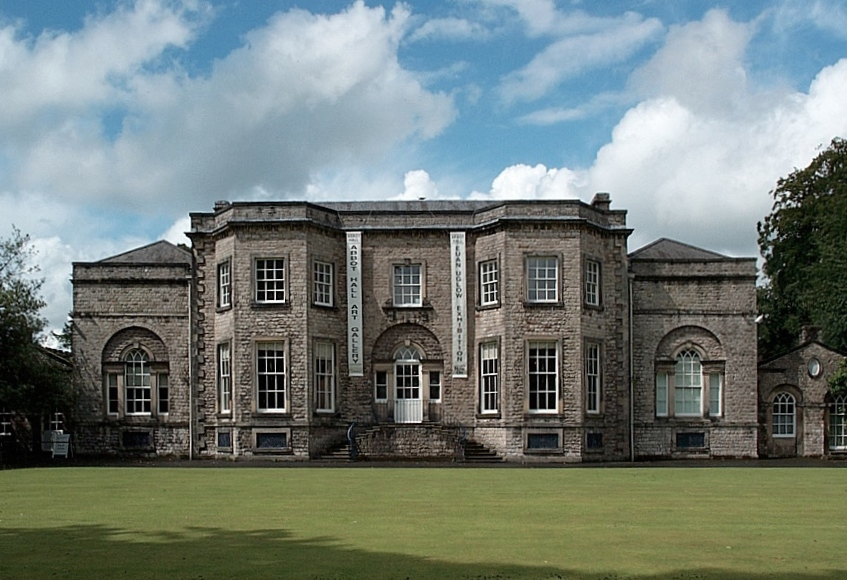
Abbott Hall in 2013

After her travels Burkett was appointed to the staff of the newly-opened Abbot Hall Art Gallery in 1962, and became its director in 1966, succeeding Helen Kapp. She held this post until she retired in 1986. Under her leadership the museum developed and expanded, and major acquisitions included Barbara Hepworth's Trezion, works by George Romney, and the triptych The Great Picture of Lady Anne Clifford. She established the adjacent Museum of Lakeland Life & Industry which opened in 1971 and in 1973 was the first winner of the Museum of the Year award.

While at Abbot Hall she wrote several books on Cumbrian artists and other personalities, including John Bracken, Kurt Schwitters, George Smith ("the Skiddaw Hermit"), May Moore, Joseph Sutton, Christopher Steele and George Senhouse. She co-authored books on William Green and Mathias Read with David Sloss, and on Jenny Cowern and Percy Kelly with Valerie Rickerby. William Green of Ambleside won the Lakeland Book of the Year in 1984, and Percy Kelly: a Cumbrian Artist in 1998. A book of her letters from Percy Kelly, Dear Mary, Love Percy: A Creative Thread - The Illustrated Letters of Percy Kelly to Mary Burkett 1968-1993 edited by David Sloss was published in 2011 and won the same award.

== Felt ==
In 1979 she organised an exhibition "Art of the Feltmaker" at Abbot Hall, and wrote a book to accompany the exhibition, which toured the country. Following the interest in this exhibition the International Feltmakers Association was founded in 1984 and Burkett became its first President.

== After Abbot Hall ==
In the year of her retirement from Abbot Hall, Burkett inherited Isel Hall near Cockermouth from a friend and distant relation Margaret Austen Leigh. This included a 14th-century pele tower but was in a state of disrepair: Burkett "was once introduced to the Prince of Wales as "the maddest woman in England" for taking it on.", but opened it to the public weekly with volunteer help and had plans to make it an artists' colony.

She was a supporter of many cultural institutions in Cumbria. She was a Trustee of the Rosehill Theatre in Whitehaven, a director of Border Television, and a member of Carlisle Cathedral's Diocesan Advisory Committee and its Fabric Committee. She helped raise funds to establish Senhouse Roman Museum in Maryport, and was a trustee for 20 years and its chair for seven.

Burkett appeared in a 2007 BBC documentary about her friend, Alfred Wainwright. They had had weekly meetings while she was director of Abbot Hall and he was Kendal borough treasurer.

Burkett died 12 November 2014. The previous night she had attended a lecture at Senhouse Roman Museum, and a few days before had announced a grant award as President of the Rosehill Theatre Trust. Her substantial art collection was auctioned after her death.

== Recognition ==
Burkett was appointed OBE in the 1978 New Year Honours.

A 1986 oil portrait by Carel Weight, titled Mary Burkett, OBE, is held in the Abbot Hall Art Gallery.

== Selected publications ==
- Burkett, Mary E. (December 1977). "An Early Date for the Origin of Felt". Anatolian Studies. 27: 111–115. doi:10.2307/3642656. JSTOR 3642656. S2CID 161302565.
- Burkett, M.E. (1979). Art of the Felt Maker. Abbot Hall Art Gallery. ISBN 978-0950333519.
- Burkett, Mary; Malet de Carteret, Genette (2006). The Beckoning East: A Journey Through Turkey and Persia in 1962. Skiddaw Press. ISBN 978-0952835660.
- Burkett, Mary E. (2003). Christopher Steele 1733-1767 of Acre Walls, Egremont : George Romney's teacher. Skiddaw Press.
