= News and Star =

Newspaper in Cumbria, England

- Type: Daily newspaper except Sunday (Fridays: West Cumbria only).
- Format: Tabloid
- Owner: USA Today Co.
- Publisher: Newsquest
- Associate editor: Chris Story
- Founded: 1910; 116 years ago
- Headquarters: Carlisle
- Circulation: 1,720 (as of 2024)
- Website: newsandstar.co.uk

The News and Star (formerly the Evening News and Star and Cumberland News) is a local tabloid newspaper in Cumbria. As of 18 October 2018, it belongs to Newsquest who produce several regional newspapers throughout the UK.

The newspaper is published every day from Monday to Saturday and is available throughout North and West Cumbria and parts of Southern Scotland.

In 2005 it had a daily circulation of approximately 25,084 copies (Jul–Dec 2005), however that had dropped to 6,611 by 2018, and just over 2,300 by March 2023.

== Former journalists ==
- Roger Lytollis, author of the 2022 Lakeland Book of the Year winner Panic as Man Burns Crumpets, who was a feature writer
