= Grace Dent =

English columnist, broadcaster and author (born 1973)

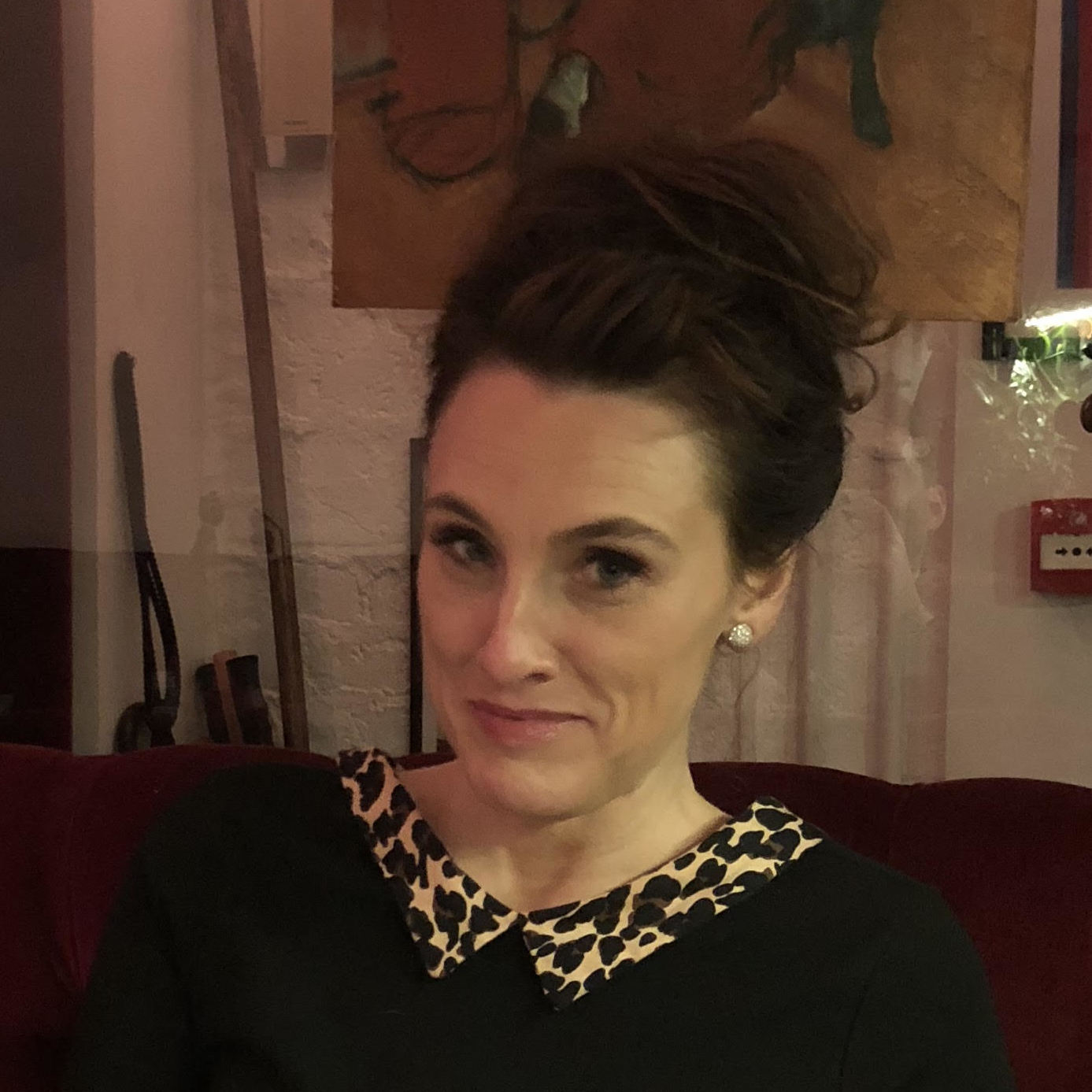
- Dent in 2017
- Born: Grace Georgina Dent; 3 October 1973 (age 53); Aldershot, Hampshire, England
- Education: University of Stirling
- Occupations: Journalist; author; broadcaster
- Years active: 1999–present

Grace Georgina Dent (born 3 October 1973) is an English columnist, broadcaster and author. She is a restaurant critic for The Guardian and from 2011 to 2017 had a restaurant column in the Evening Standard. Since 2025, she has co-presented of the BBC series MasterChef.

Dent wrote 11 novels for teenagers in the 2000s, including the Diary of a Chav series. She has also written three non-fiction books. In 2019, she received an Honorary Fellowship from the University of Cumbria.

== Early life ==
Dent was born in Aldershot, Hampshire and grew up in Carlisle, Cumbria. Dent attended Bishop Goodwin Primary School in Currock, Carlisle, Caldew School in Dalston, Cumbria. She studied English Literature at the University of Stirling. While at university, she wrote features for Cosmopolitan after winning a place on their Student Advisory panel.

== Career ==
=== Journalism ===
After graduation from Stirling University, Dent's first job was editorial assistant for Marie Claire magazine in London.

Dent began writing for The Guardian in 1999. She wrote "World of Lather", celebrating her love of Coronation Street and other soap operas, for the Guardian's Guide supplement from 2001 to 2010. From 2010 to 2012, she wrote "Grace Dent's TV-OD". In 2012, she signed a joint deal with The Independent and the London Evening Standard. She became the restaurant critic of The Guardian in January 2018. In November 2017, Dent won "Reviewer of the Year" at the London Restaurant Festival.

She has written about the death of her mother from cancer in 2021 and the death of her father from dementia in 2022, having cared for each during their illnesses.

She has been "mainly vegan" since the early 2010s, describing herself as plant-based or a flexitarian.

=== Published work ===
Dent's debut novel It's a Girl Thing, the first in her teen LBD (Les Bambinos Dangereuses) trilogy for Puffin Books, was published in 2003. She was shortlisted for the 2008 Queen of Teen Prize.

Hodder & Stoughton acquired the rights to Dent's next young adult (YA) Diary of a Chav series, starting with the first novel Trainers v. Tiaras in 2006. Dent would go on to author five further Diary of a Chav installments.

In December 2008, Dent signed a further two-book deal with Hodder for the publication of her next novel Diary of a Snob and its sequel Money Can't Buy Me Love. Diary of a Snob was launched at the 2009 Hay-on-Wye Literary Festival.

Dent was a judge on the 2011 Roald Dahl Funny Prize.

Faber & Faber and The Guardian Books published Dent's first non-fiction book How to Leave Twitter: My Time as Queen of the Universe and Why This Must Stop in July 2011.

Via a 15-way auction in 2018, Mudlark (a HarperCollins non-fiction imprint) acquired the rights to publish Dent's memoir Hungry: A memoir of wanting more in 2020. Hungry won the 2021 Lakeland Book of the Year among other accolades.

In 2021, HarperFiction acquired an adult fiction novel from Dent titled Best Served Cold.

Dent reunited with Guardian Faber in 2023 to publish Comfort Eating: What We Eat When Nobody's Looking, a companion book to Dent's podcast of the same title.

=== Television and radio ===
Since 2016, Dent has presented The Untold on BBC Radio 4.

Grace joined Ainsley Harriott for a five-part series on Channel 4 called Best of Britain by the Sea in 2022.

In 2023, she participated in the 23rd series of I'm a Celebrity...Get Me Out of Here!. On 27 November 2023, after 9 days in the jungle, Dent left the show on "medical grounds". She was placed 12th.

Dent was previously a regular critic on MasterChef, Masterchef: The Professionals and Celebrity Masterchef. She also appeared as a judge on the BBC Two series Great British Menu.

On 18 December 2024, it was announced Dent would replace Gregg Wallace as a judge on Celebrity Masterchef in 2025, co-presenting with Anna Haugh from the 22nd series.

== Personal life ==
Dent was previously married and divorced. As of 2021, she is engaged.

== Bibliography ==
=== LBD trilogy ===
- It's a Girl Thing (2003)
- Live & Fabulous! (2004)
- Friends Forever! (2006)

=== Diary of a Chav series ===
- Trainers V Tiaras (2006)
- Posh and Prejudice (2007)
- Too Cool for School (2007)
- Ibiza Nights (2008)
- Fame and Fortune (2008)
- Keeping It Real (2009)

=== Diary of a Snob duology ===
- Poor Little Rich Girl (2009)
- Money Can't Buy Me Love (2010)

=== Non-fiction ===
- How to Leave Twitter: My Time as Queen of the Universe and Why This Must Stop (2011)
- Christmas: What The Fa-La-La-La-La? (2019), audiobook with Paul Kerensa
- Hungry: A memoir of wanting more (2020)
- Comfort Eating: What We Eat When Nobody's Looking (2023)

=== Adult novels ===
- Best Served Cold (TBA)

== Accolades ==
Year	Award	Category	Title	Result	Ref.
2008	Queen of Teen Prize			Shortlisted	
2017	London Restaurant Festival	Reviewer of the Year		Won	
2021	Fortnum & Mason Food and Drink Awards	Debut Food Book	Hungry: A memoir of wanting more	Won	
2021	Lakeland Book of the Year		Hungry: A memoir of wanting more	Won	
2022	Campaign British Media Awards	Comfort Eating	Podcast of the Year	Won	
2022	British Podcast Awards	Comfort Eating	Beat Commercial Campaign	Shortlisted	
