= Lakeland Book of the Year =

English literary award, established 1984

The Lakeland Book of the Year, also known as the Hunter Davies Lakeland Book of the Year, is an award named for the Lake District of north west England and given annually for a book, originally "set in or featuring Cumbria in some way". From 2026 the criterion is that "The author of the book should have strong connections to Cumbria, or the book itself must have a majority of Cumbria-related content." It was founded by writer Hunter Davies in 1984 and was administered by Cumbria Tourism until 2025. Davies was one of the judges from 1984 to 2022. In 2023, following Davies's retirement from the role, the judges were Fiona Armstrong, Eric Robson, Michael McGregor, director of Wordsworth Grasmere, Kathleen Jones and "guest judge" Rachel Laverack from Cumbria County Council. The prizes were traditionally announced at a gala lunch in June, although in 2020 the proceedings took place online because of COVID-19. Cumbria Tourism announced the dates for the 2025 award, but later announced that they were no longer organising the award.

From 2026 "The awards ... are now run by the Lakeland Book of the Year in association with a panel of distinguished trustees and judges." As of January 2026 the trustees are Hunter Davies, Michael McGregor, author Kathleen Jones, Vicky Robinson, and Fiona Armstrong.

There are a number of awards for specific categories of books, and an overall winner is selected as the "Book of the Year". From the 2021 competition (for books published in 2020), and still for 2026, the categories were:

- Fiction
- Guides and Places
- Illustration and Presentation
- Landscape and Tradition
- Literature and Poetry
- People and Business

In 2023 a new prize for Children's Poem of the Year, sponsored by CGP Books was added, open to Cumbrian schoolchildren between key stages 2 and 5.

== Winners ==
List of winners, sortable by year, author, title, publisher
Year	Author	Title	Publisher & ISBN	Notes
1984 joint	Automobile Association and Ordnance Survey	AA/OS Guide to the Lake District	AA/OS ISBN 978-0861451920	
1984 joint	Mary E. Burkett & David Sloss	William Green of Ambleside: Lake District Artist (1760-1823)	Abbot Hall Art Gallery ISBN 978-0950333540	on William Green
1985	Alfred Wainwright with photographs by Derry Brabbs	Fellwalking with Wainwright	Michael Joseph ISBN 9780718124281	18 favourite walks; new ed published 2006
1986/87 joint	Peter Thornton	Lakeland from the Air	Dalesman ISBN 978-0852068502	with foreword by Alfred Wainwright
1986/87 joint	Trevor Haywood	Walking with a Camera in Herries' Lakeland	Fountain Press ISBN 978-0863430237	referring to Hugh Walpole's Herries Chronicles
1988	Molly Lefebure	The Bondage of Love – A Life of Mrs Samuel Taylor Coleridge	Victor Gollancz ISBN 0-575-03871-3	on the poet's wife Sara Fricker
1989	Enid Wilson	Country Diary	Hodder & Stoughton ISBN 0-340-41522-3	Wilson wrote for "Country Diary" in The Guardian for 30 years
1990	Vivian Russell	Dream gardens: discovering the gardens of the Lake District	Century ISBN 9780712629126	
1991	David Clifford (ed)	The Diaries of Lady Anne Clifford	Sutton ISBN 9780750931786	editor is a descendant of Lady Anne
1992	Alan Hankinson	Coleridge Walks the Fells: A Lakeland Journey Retraced	Ellenbank ISBN 978-1873551004	retracing Coleridge's 1802 9-day walk
1993	Iain Peters & Colin Shelbourn	Rocky Rambler's Wild Walker	Cicerone ISBN 978-1852843472	10 Lake District walks for children
1994	Grevel Lindop	A Literary Guide to the Lake District	Chatto & Windus ISBN 9780701161620	a 3rd ed was published in 2015
1995	John Heelis	The Tale of Mrs. William Heelis	Sutton ISBN 978-0750921251	author's great-uncle was Beatrix Potter's husband William Heelis
1996	June Thistlethwaite	Cumbrian Women Remember: Lake District Life in the Early 1900s	Sutton ISBN 978-1873551127	
1997	Andrew Wilson	A President's Love Affair with the Lake District: Woodrow Wilson's Second Home	Lakeland Press Agency ISBN 9780952855002	on Woodrow Wilson's visits to the area: his mother was born in Carlisle
1998	Mary E. Burkett & Valerie M. Rickerby	Percy Kelly: a Cumbrian Artist	Skiddaw ISBN 978-0952835622	on Percy Kelly
1999	Gil and Pat Hitchon	Sam Bough, RSA: the Rivers in Bohemia	Book Guild ISBN 978-1857762303	on Carlisle-born Sam Bough RSA
2000	A. Harry Griffin	The Coniston Tigers: Seventy Years of Mountain Adventure	Sigma Leisure ISBN 9781850587132	autobiography
2001	John & Eileen Malden	Rex Malden's Whitehaven	Try Malden ISBN 9780953925704	photographs by John Malden's father, vicar of Whitehaven
2002	Ian Tyler	Cumbrian Mining	Blue Rock ISBN 978-0952302865	in 2002 the author ran the Threlkeld Quarry and Mining Museum
2003	Cumbria Bird Club	The Breeding Birds of Cumbria: A Tetrad Atlas 1997-2001	Cumbria Bird Club ISBN 978-0954324902	Cumbria Bird Club
2004	Martin Varley	Lakeland life in the 1940s and 1950s : the photographs of Gwen Bertelsman	Halsgrove ISBN 978-1841142777	Gwen Bertelsman ("Bertlesman" in many sources) died in 1994
2005	Jane Renouf	The Lake Artists Society: 1904-2004 - A Centenary Celebration	Lake Artists Society ISBN 978-0954678500	on the Lake Artists Society
2006	Chris Crowder; photographs by Vivian Russell	The Garden at Levens	Frances Lincoln ISBN 978-0711224346	on Levens Hall
2007	Linda Lear	Beatrix Potter: A Life In Nature	Penguin ISBN 978-0141003108	on Beatrix Potter
2008	Tim Longville; photographs by Val Corbett	Gardens of the Lake District	Frances Lincoln ISBN 9780711227132	
2009	Keith Richardson	Ivver Sen: Lake District: The Life and Times of the Men and Women Who Work the Land	River Greta Writer ISBN 978-0955964008	title means "Ever since" in Cumbrian dialect
2010	Chris Wadsworth	Hercules and the Farmer’s Wife; And Other Stories from a Cumbrian Art Gallery	Aurum Press ISBN 978-1845135546	by owner of the Castlegate House Art Gallery in Cockermouth
2011	Cate Haste	Sheila Fell: a Passion for Paint	Lund Humphries ISBN 978-0853319795	on Sheila Fell
2012 joint	David Cross	Dear Mary, Love Percy: A Creative Thread - The Illustrated Letters of Percy Kelly to Mary Burkett 1968-1993	Skiddaw Press ISBN 978-0955964022	letters from Percy Kelly to Mary Burkett
2012 joint	Keith Richardson & Val Corbett	Jack's Yak: A Unique Journey Through Time with the Special Trees of the Lake District and Cumbria and the Remarkable Stories They Have to Tell	River Greta Writer ISBN 978-0955964022	the title tree is an oak ("yak") on the Lowther estate
2013	Stephen Matthews	A Lazy Tour in Cumberland	Bookcase ISBN 9781904147688	when Wilkie Collins and Charles Dickens visited in 1857 and wrote The Lazy Tour of Two Idle Apprentices
2014	Simon Temple-Bennett	Undressed for Dinner	Hayloft ISBN 9781904524984	on turning Augill Castle into a hotel
2015	James Rebanks	The Shepherd's Life: A Tale of the Lake District	Allen Lane ISBN 9781846148545	on sheep farming in Matterdale
2016	Robert Beale & Richard Kirkman	Lakeland Waterways: a history of travel along the English Lakes	Lily ISBN 9781907945861	Beale is a Windermere Lake Cruises skipper
2017	Rory Stewart	The Marches: Border Walks With My Father	Jonathan Cape ISBN 978-0224097680	a walk through the Scottish Marches
2018	Phil Rigby	Portrait of Cumbria: Life and Landscape	CN Group ISBN 9781999771201	photographs
2019	Alan Cleaver & Lesley Park	The Corpse Roads of Cumbria	Chitty Mouse Press ISBN 978-1999671808	on corpse roads
2020	David Felton, Evelyn Sinclair & Andrew Chapman	The Lake District in 101 Maps and Infographics	Jake Island ISBN 978-1999894030	Announced online 30 June 2020, no gala lunch event, because of COVID-19. "The graphics cover just about everything people want to know or think they know about the Lakes".
2021	Grace Dent	Hungry: A Memoir of Wanting More	HarperCollins ISBN 9780008333188	autobiography
2022	Roger Lytollis	Panic as Man Burns Crumpets: The Vanishing World of the Local Journalist	Robinson ISBN 978-1472145796	autobiography
2023	Amy Bateman	Forty Farms: Conversations about change in the landscapes of Cumbria	Jake Island ISBN 978-1915513014	photography
2024	Polly Atkin	Some Of Us Just Fall	Sceptre ISBN 9781399717984	memoir
2025	William D. Shannon	Cumbria, 1000 Years of Maps	Inspired by Lakeland ISBN 978-1-915513-05-2	
2026	Sarah Hall	Helm	Faber ISBN 978-0571383559	novel personifying the Helm Wind
