= Diary of a Chav =

Series of books by Grace Dent

- UK cover for Trainers V. Tiaras
- Trainers V. Tiaras; Slinging the Bling; Too Cool for School; Ibiza Nights; Fame and Fortune; Keeping it Real
- Author: Grace Dent
- Country: United Kingdom
- Language: English
- Publisher: Hodder Children's Books (UK); Little, Brown Books for Young Readers (US)
- Published: 2007 - 2009
- Media type: Print, e-book, audiobook
- No. of books: 6

Diary of a Chav is a young adult series that was written by the English journalist, author, and broadcaster Grace Dent. The series consists of six books that were originally released in the United Kingdom from 2007 to 2009. An attempt to publish the books overseas in the United States was largely unsuccessful and only the first two books, re-titled for American publication, were released.

== Synopsis ==
The series follows Shiraz Bailey-Wood, a 15-year-old girl growing up in Goodmayes, Essex. At the series' start she's largely content to live her life as an underachiever and cause trouble, but things change after she receives a diary and begins recording the events of her daily life. Soon she begins to want more out of life than the chav lifestyle that she's been experiencing and starts expressing a desire to become a professional writer and publish her own autobiography. This decision does not come without opposition as there are many who believe this to be an unobtainable dream and one that is not suitable for someone like Shiraz, however she continues to persevere despite multiple setbacks and obstacles. In the first book, Trainers V. Tiaras; Shiraz worries that her school Mayflower Comprehensive will still live up to its reputation of being "Superchav Academy" a nickname given to the school by the local newspapers and especially with a stunt that happened during the Christmas assembly which Shiraz was the instigator of; however, that all started to change, once a new English teacher Miss. Bracket arrived and saw potential in Shiraz and was concerned why she would not want to succeed, however Shiraz' world is turned upside down when her best friend Carrie Draper starts fancying a local boy called Bezzie Kelleher and sets a double date for both Bezzie, Carrie and Wesley Barrington Bains II (Bezzie's best friend) and Shiraz, the date did not go to plan as both Bezzie and Carrie dropped off Wesley and Shiraz whilst they go for a drive around Essex, Shiraz is not too sure if she fancies Wesley or not.

== Books ==
1. Trainers V. Tiaras (2007), (also published under the titles Diary of a Chav and Diva Without a Cause in the US)
2. Slinging the Bling (2007), (also published under the title Posh and Prejudice in the US)
3. Too Cool for School (2008)
4. The Ibiza Diaries (2008), (later published under the titles Ibiza Nights and Lost in Ibiza)
5. The Fame Diaries (2008), (later published under the title Fame and Fortune)
6. Keeping It Real (2009), (also published under the title The Real Diaries)

== Reception ==
Critical reception for the series has been largely positive. Several American media outlets have praised the series while also remarking on its use of British slang, causing the School Library Journal to comment that many Americans would have to consult the books' glossary. YALSA has favorably reviewed the series' first book, stating "Shiraz's hilarious adventures and misadventures also have a serious side, as she deals with family, stereotypes, and relationships, while trying to figure out just what it is she really wants out of life."
