= Roger Lytollis =

British writer

Roger Lytollis is a British journalist and author. He is best known for his memoir Panic as Man Burns Crumpets: The Vanishing World of the Local Journalist, which won the 2022 Lakeland Book of the Year Award.

Lytollis is a journalist from Carlisle and was a feature writer with The Cumberland News/News & Star from 1995 to 2019.

== Books ==
- Glass, Jimmy; Lytollis, Roger (September 2004). One Hit Wonder: The Jimmy Glass Story. History Press Limited. ISBN 978-0-7524-3181-9.
- Lytollis, Roger (1 July 2021). Panic as Man Burns Crumpets: The Vanishing World of the Local Journalist. Little, Brown Book Group. ISBN 978-1-4721-4578-9.
- Lytollis, Roger (4 November 2021). On a Pedestal: A Trip around Britain's Statues. Little, Brown Book Group. ISBN 978-1-4721-4611-3.
