= Polly Atkin =

English poet and non-fiction writer (born 1980)

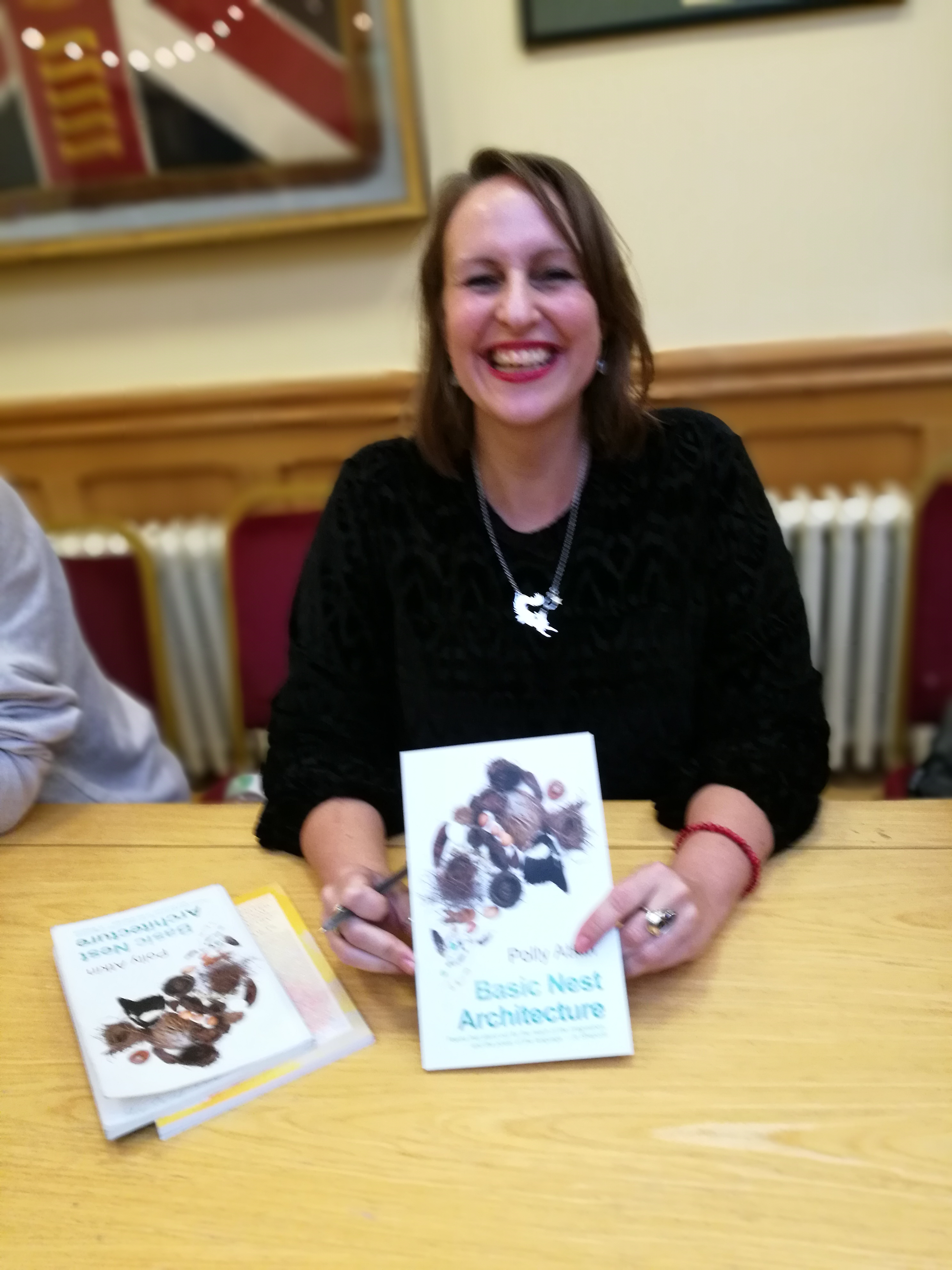
Atkin at the Durham Book Festival 2017, with her book Basic Nest Architecture

Polly Rowena Atkin FRSL (born 1980) is an English poet and non-fiction writer based in Grasmere, Cumbria.

== Early life and education ==
Atkin was born in 1980 in Nottingham and grew up there, then lived seven years in East London before moving north. She has a PhD (2010) from Lancaster University, for which her thesis was "A place re-imagined : the cultural, literacy and spacial making of Dove Cottage, Grasmere". She has an MA in creative writing from Royal Holloway, University of London, for which her thesis was "Writing the Body Well: Poetry and Illness".

== Career ==
Atkin taught English and creative writing at Lancaster University from 2010 to 2014, and at the University of Strathclyde from 2014 to 2017, and has since taught creative writing at the universities of Lancaster and Cumbria.

Atkin's pamphlet bone song was shortlisted for the first Michael Marks Award for Poetry Pamphlets, in 2009. Her second pamphlet, Shadow Dispatches (2013), won the Mslexia pamphlet prize, and was shortlisted for the 2014 Lakeland Book of the Year.

Her first book-length collection, Basic Nest Architecture, was published in 2017; it was divided into three sections, with poems relating to her move from London to the Lake district, earlier places and topics, and her current experience of living with chronic illness. It included several poems which had previously won prizes or been shortlisted in competitions.

In 2018, Atkin was writer in residence at Gladstone's Library. In 2020, during the COVID-19 pandemic, she was awarded a Northern Writers Award for Poetry, and said of it "This award not only offers creative encouragement when I really need it, but financial support which will make continuing to create possible. It has saved my year."

Atkin's 2021 biography of Dorothy Wordsworth, Recovering Dorothy: The Hidden Life of Dorothy Wordsworth, draws on Dorothy's letters and unpublished diaries and "argues for Dorothy's place in the writing of illness". It was longlisted for the 2022 Barbellion Prize for books by ill or disabled writers. Her 2021 poetry collection Much With Body was described in Wales Arts Review as "an exploration of pain and illness refracted through the geographical lens of the Lake District, and the often overlooked writings of Dorothy Wordsworth".

Her 2023 memoir Some of Us Just Fall won the 2024 Lakeland Book of the Year. It has been described as "a raw and exquisite meditation on chronic illness and our place within the landscape", "An empowered and patient story, at times murky and tedious, but still poignant", and "Essentially ... a book about bearing the unbearable".

She is a founder and director of The Gravestone Project, "a digital humanities collective that brings together scholars, taphophiles, students, writers, teachers, and others interested in history, literature, and the arts, to think about the various ways that people memorialize the dead".

She was elected a fellow of the Royal Society of Literature in 2022.

== Awards ==
- 2024 Lakeland Book of the Year for Some of Us Just Fall

== Personal life ==
Atkin has one of the Ehlers–Danlos syndromes and genetic haemochromatosis, and writes and talks about living with chronic illness especially in relation to rural life and access to nature. She was a speaker at the 2023 Kendal Mountain Festival but published an open letter criticising the announcement that the festival's events would not be filmed that year, announced as an "enrichment" at short notice, arguing that this deprived many people, because of disability, geography, finance or other barriers, of the joy of access to the festival whose theme, that year, was "joy".

Atkins lives in Grasmere, Cumbria. In 2023 she and her partner Will Smith bought Sam Read's, Grasmere's independent bookshop established in 1887, where Smith had worked since 2012.

== Selected publications ==
=== Non-fiction ===
==== Books ====
- Atkin, Polly (2026). Swimming the Seasons: A Freshwater Almanac. Salford: Saraband. ISBN 978-1-916812-38-3.
- Atkin, Polly (2026). The Company of Owls: A memoir. Minneapolis, Minnesota: Milkweed Editions. ISBN 9781639551804.
- Akin, Polly (2024). The Company of Owls. London: Elliott and Thompson. ISBN 978-1-78396-814-5.
- Atkin, Polly (2023). Some of Us Just Fall: On nature and not getting better. London: Sceptre. ISBN 9781399717984.
- Atkin, Polly (2021). Recovering Dorothy: the hidden life of Dorothy Wordsworth. Salford: Saraband. ISBN 9781913393175. (On Dorothy Wordsworth)

==== Chapters ====
- Atkin, Polly (9 January 2020). "Collaboration, Domestic Co-Partnery and Lyrical Ballads". In Bushell, Sally (ed.). The Cambridge Companion to 'Lyrical Ballads'. Cambridge University Press. pp. 32–48. ISBN 978-1-108-41632-0. (On Lyrical Ballads)
- Atkin, Polly (5 February 2020). "'Stinking of me': Transformations and animal selves in contemporary Anglophone women's poetry". In George, Sam; Hughes, Bill (eds.). In the company of wolves: Werewolves, wolves and wild children. Manchester University Press. ISBN 978-1-5261-2905-5.
- Atkin, Polly (6 October 2015). "Paradox Inn: Home and Passing Through at Grasmere". In Bode, Christoph; Labbe, Jacqueline (eds.). Romantic Localities: Europe Writes Place. Routledge. pp. 81–98. ISBN 978-1-317-32431-7. (On Grasmere)
- Atkin, Polly (31 March 2009). "Ghosting Grasmere: the musealisation of Dove Cottage". In Watson, Nicola (ed.). Literary Tourism and Nineteenth-Century Culture. Springer. pp. 84–94. ISBN 978-0-230-23410-9. (On Dove Cottage)

=== Poetry ===
- Atkin, Polly (2026). Emergency Dream. Bridgend: Seren. ISBN 978-1-78172-795-9.
- Atkin, Polly (2021). Much With Body. Bridgend: Seren. ISBN 9781781726457.
- Atkin, Polly (2018). With Invisible Rain. Leicester: New Walk Editions. ISBN 9781999802639.
- Atkin, Polly (2017). Basic Nest Architecture. Bridgend: Seren. ISBN 9781781723739.
- Atkin, Polly (2013). Shadow Dispatches. Bridgend: Seren. ISBN 9781781726457.
- Atkin, Polly (2008). bone song. Clitheroe: Aussteiger. ISBN 9781872764160.
