= Kathleen Jones (writer) =

English poet and biographer

Kathleen Jones (born 1946) is an English poet and biographer.

== Biography ==
Born and brought up on a hill farm in the north of England, she moved to London as a teenager in order to become a writer. She spent several years in Africa and the Middle East - where she worked in English broadcasting - before returning home. She read law and then English Literature as a mature student at university before specialising in early women writers - work that culminated in A Glorious Fame, the life of Margaret Cavendish, Duchess of Newcastle.

Her published work includes radio journalism, articles for magazines and newspapers, short fiction and seventeen books - a mixture of biography, fiction, general non-fiction and five poetry collections. Her biography of Katherine Mansfield called The Storyteller, was published in New Zealand in August 2010 by Penguin and in the UK in December 2010 by Edinburgh University Press. It includes an account of Mansfield's relationship with John Middleton Murry, his work as editor of Mansfield's unpublished manuscripts, letters and notebooks after her death, and how this adversely affected his own life. In 2013 she published a biography of Norman Nicholson - The Whispering Poet - with The Book Mill Press, and more recently, 'Travelling to the Edge of the World', an account of her journey through British Columbia to Haida Gwaii, looking at environmental issues.

Jones has published poetry, feature articles and short fiction in a variety of national and international magazines and newspapers. Her short stories have been anthologised and broadcast on Radio 4 and on radio networks in the Netherlands, Germany and Spain. She is on the British Council authors list, and was one of the featured authors in the 'Save our Short Story Anthology' compiled by the Arts Council on the internet. She has also written three novels, The Sun's Companion (2013) and The Centauress (2015) and Mussolini's Hat (2018).

A prize-winning collection of poetry, Unwritten Lives, was published by Redbeck Press in 1995 and a further collection Secret Eden was exhibited as part of a collaborative project for Visual Arts Year 97 with landscape photographer Tony Riley. Her collection Not Saying Goodbye at Gate 21, published by Templar Poetry, was joint winner of the Straid Collection Award 2011. Since then she has published a new pamphlet 'Mapping Emily', with Templar, a collection 'The Rainmaker's Wife' with Indigo Dreams Publishing, and 'Hunger' with Maytree Press.

Jones is a regular performer at Literature Festivals all over Britain and leads creative writing workshops for fiction, poetry and life writing. She is also a tutor for the Open University's creative writing program and currently a Royal Literary Fund Fellow. She currently lives in the English Lake District close to where she was brought up Cumbria.

== Works ==
=== Biography ===
- A Glorious Fame, Bloomsbury, 1988. (Biography of Margaret Cavendish)
- Learning not to be First. Windrush, 1990; OUP, 1991; Goldmann (Germany) 1996. (Biography of Christina Rossetti)
- A Passionate Sisterhood. Constable, 1997; Virago 1998. (Lives of the Wives, Sisters and Daughters of Wordsworth, Coleridge and Southey)
- Catherine Cookson: The Biography. Constable, 1999; Little Brown, 2000; Random House Australia 2000.
- Seeking Catherine Cookson’s Da, A genealogical quest. Constable Robinson, 2004.
- An Introduction to Margaret Forster. Northern Lights, 2003 ISBN 0-905404-92-0
- Katherine Mansfield: The Story-Teller, Penguin NZ, 2010; Edinburgh University Press, 2011. A life of Katherine Mansfield and her husband John Middleton Murry.
- A Passionate Sisterhood. The Book Mill2011 ISBN 978-0-9567303-0-5
- Christina Rossetti: Learning Not To Be First. The Book Mill 2011 ISBN 978-0-9567303-2-9
- Margaret Cavendish: A glorious Fame. The Book Mill 2012 ISBN 978-0-9567303-5-0
- Margaret Forster: A Life in Books. The Book Mill 2012 ISBN 978-0-9567303-8-1
- Norman Nicholson: The Whispering Poet. The Book Mill 2013 ISBN 978-0-9574332-4-3

=== Other non-fiction ===
as Kate Gordon:-

- A Practical Guide to Alternative Weddings, Constable, 1998; reprint, 2002. ISBN 1-84119-606-1
- A Practical Guide to Alternative Baptism and Baby-naming, Constable, 1998
- A Practical Guide to Alternative Funerals, Constable, 1998. ISBN 0-09-478770-0

=== Poetry ===
- Invisible Lipstick. Stone Edge Press, 1986.
- Rumours of Another Sky. Stone Edge Press, 1987
- Unwritten Lives. Redbeck Press, 1995. ISBN 0-946980-22-5
- Other Poetry, 2001.
- Not Saying Goodbye at Gate 21 ISBN 978-1-906285-14-2
- Mapping Emily
- The Rainmaker's Wife
- Hunger

=== Fiction ===
- The Centauress The Book Mill 2012 ISBN 978-0-9574332-7-4
- The Sun's Companion The Book Mill 2014 ISBN 978-0-9567303-7-4
- Mussolini's Hat The Book Mill 2018 ISBN 978-0-9932045-7-9

=== Short fiction ===
- Northern Stories Vol 5 1994 Ed. Beryl Bainbridge and David Pownall ISBN 0-946407-97-5
- Arc Short Stories Vol 8 1997 (Ed. Maureen Freely and Livi Michael) ISBN 1-900072-16-5
- Eating Your Cake - and Having it (Anthology) ISBN 0-9525155-1-2
- BBC Radio 4 Short Story slot, 1994, 1995, 1998
- Tabla 1996, 1999, (ISBN 0-9532981-1-6); 2001, (ISBN 0-9532981-3-2).
- Pitch 2001 (ed. by Susan Tranter)
- Landscape into Literature - A Writers' Anthology 2005 ISBN 1-903998-55-7
- Three and Other Stories Amazon Kindle The Book Mill 2011 ISBN 978-0-9567303-1-2
