= Percy Kelly (artist) =

British artist and footballer (1918–1993)

- Born: Robert Kelly; 1918; Workington, England
- Died: 1993 (aged 74–75); Norfolk, England
- Other names: Bob Kelly; Roberta Penelope Kelly (1985–1992)
- Spouses: Audrey James (m. 1942; div. 1971); Christine Griffith (m. 1972; div. 1983)
- Children: 1
- Patrons: Sir Nicholas Sekers
- Website: www.percykelly.co.uk

Kelly in his prime

Robert Percy Kelly (1918–1993, known from 1985 to 1992 as Roberta Penelope Kelly) was an English artist, footballer, postal worker, and cross-dresser from Cumberland. He is known for his drawings and paintings depicting industrial coastal landscapes in decay, which he hoarded during his lifetime. Of his own drawings, he wrote: "They are so important to me I could never sell them".

== Early life ==
Kelly was born in Workington in 1918. He was a twin, and one of seven children of Oscar, a carpenter from the Isle of Man and Martha, from Scotland; they shared a home with Martha's father Hugh. He attended Workington's Central Secondary School and worked for the General Post Office as a telegraph messenger boy from 1932 to 1939 before serving in the Royal Corps of Signals from 1939 to 1946. He worked for the Post Office again after the war, becoming sub-postmaster at Great Broughton from 1952 to 1958 which is now commemorated with a plaque. In the mid-1950s, he played football for Workington under Bill Shankly. In 1958, he moved to Allonby.

== Art career ==
Kelly began drawing as a child, encouraged by his mother. In 1932, at the age of fourteen, he was awarded the top prize in a national handwriting competition organised by Royal Mail. His school teachers had advised his father he should attend grammar school and art college, but the family's finances did not allow this.

During the Second World War, while working with the Royal Signals, Kelly's artistic skills were noticed by the head of art at Repton School. For a time, his section was transferred to Churchill's war rooms, where Kelly later said he had discussed art with Winston Churchill himself. Kelly's early works were part of an exhibition of artwork by servicemen in London, and were accepted by the Royal Academy of Arts and other exhibits in Glasgow and Edinburgh.

Although he did not attend art school until he was in his forties, Kelly gained recognition alongside other artists such as L. S. Lowry and Sheila Fell, and was known to King George VI and admired by Princess Margaret.

From 1961 to 1965, Kelly studied etching, lithography, and printed textiles at Carlisle College of Art and Design. In 1963, his watercolours went on display at the National Gallery in London. That same year, he showed his work to Bill Hamilton, chief designer at West Cumberland Silk Mills, and offered to paint for the company. Impressed, entrepreneur Miki Sekers, later known as Sir Nicholas Sekers, commissioned Kelly to paint watercolours of the mills' Jacquard looms, as well as landscapes of Whitehaven and Parton. In 1966, Sekers hosted the first public exhibition of Kelly's work at Rosehill Theatre in Moresby. Sekers subsequently put on two more exhibitions at his show rooms at Sloane Street, London in 1968, and at Lady Fermoy's gallery in King's Lynn in 1969.

A cross-dresser who changed his name to Roberta for a period late in life, Kelly's exploration of his feminine identity was reflected in his artwork. Whereas his early work as Percy or Bob focused on machinery and industrial landscapes, while painting as Roberta, Kelly explored more feminine themes, including flowers and self-portraits.

Kelly became known for refusing to sell his artwork except to individuals he truly liked. While he was alive, he held only five exhibitions, with most of his artwork marked NFS as not for sale. He lived in poverty but remained intransigent, even as art dealers and collectors visited him to try to buy his drawings and his friends tried to help him make a living from his work. He hid many of his paintings away, reportedly so that neither his ex-wife nor the benefits agency would find out the true value of his collection. In 1983, Kelly gave some of his charcoal drawings to Mary Burkett, but later asked her to return them, because he worried that her successor as director of Abbott Hall Art Gallery would not appreciate his work. Convinced of his own greatness, Kelly wrote that someday his cottage, which had become cluttered with paintings, would become like a shrine that would "upstage Beatrix Potter's home".

== Personal life ==
Kelly married Audrey James in 1942 and their son Brian was born in 1947; they later divorced in 1971. He married Christine Griffith in 1972 and lived with her at Levens Park Cottage in Kendal where they became friends with Mary Burkett, director of Abbott Hall Art Gallery. After living for a time in Wales, they eventually moved to rural Norfolk, and divorced in 1983.

In January 1983, Kelly received a letter from art collector Joan David, complimenting his watercolours and inquiring if any were for sale. He wrote back in a watercolour-painted envelope, starting a ten-year correspondence during which he sent her more than 1,000 letters.

He changed his name to Roberta Penelope Kelly by deed poll in 1985, but changed it back again after seven years.

Kelly died from throat cancer in Norwich in 1993.

== Legacy ==
Posthumous exhibitions of Percy Kelly's artwork have proven popular with Kelly collectors internationally. In 2000, an exhibition featuring 64 of his works at Castlegate House Gallery in Cockermouth sold off most of the items within days of opening. Some of his works have been on display in the House of Lords, and works are held in Maryport Maritime Museum and Abbot Hall Art Gallery in Kendal.
