= Christopher Steele (artist) =

English painter (1733–1768)

Christopher Steele (July 9, 1733 – 1768) was an English portrait painter from an affluent family in Egremont, Cumbria.

In 1755, when Steele had a studio at Redmaynes Yard in Kendal, the young George Romney was apprenticed to him for four years on payment of £21. Romney, in his memoirs, reported several adventures with his teacher, mostly of the wine, women, and song variety, In 1756, Steele eloped with an heiress and settled in Lancashire, freeing Romney of his indentures.

His wife died in 1761 and Steele moved to New York and then Philadelphia, where he received several commissions. But he failed to complete them, and his older brother Henry, who had emigrated to Maryland in the 1740s and had become a successful planter, had to make restoration to the families whose money Christopher had taken. He returned to Egremont in 1767 and died the following year.

Grove Dictionary of Art says of him that, "Despite his dissipation and indolence Steele was far from being an "itinerant dauber," as he is sometimes described. Over thirty works are at present attributed to him; they indicate that he was familiar with the works of Thomas Hudson and other contemporary portrait painters based in London. Steele's awareness of texture and finish place him far above the typical provincial painter of his time."

Steele's works are held in Abbot Hall Art Gallery, Kendal Town Hall, and the Merchant Adventurers' Hall, York.
