= Matetsi =

- Matetsi in Zimbabwe Map
- Coordinates: 18°05′S 25°52′E
- Country: Zimbabwe
- Province: Matabeleland North

Matetsi is a village in Matabeleland North Province, Zimbabwe, located about 55 km west of Hwange. The village started as a railway siding and took its name from the nearby Matetsi River, named for the blue-green algae locally called “Matetsi” which is found on rocks in the river. Most of the surrounding land is under forest and the Matetsi Safari Area. The nearest airports are Victoria Falls (Zimbabwe), Kasane (Botswana), and Harry Mwaanga Nkumbula (Zambia).

The Matetsi Safari Area is one of the largest hunting complexes in Zimbabwe, consisting of 7 separate concessions, covering 3,000 km^{2} (1,200 sq mi) in total. The area reaches from the Zambezi River in the north to Hwange National Park in the south. The Matetsi River flows through its southern section. The safari area is famous for its large population of Sable antelopes. Generally the fauna resembles that of the neighbouring Hwange National Park.

The north-eastern section of the safari area comprises the Matetsi Private Game Reserve, a private wildlife concession of 55,000 hectares (140,000 acres) which forms a key part of the Kavango–Zambezi Transfrontier Conservation Area. It is bordered by the Zambezi River to the north, the Zambezi National Park to the east, and the Panda-Masuie Forest Reserve, home of the Zimbabwe Elephant Nursery, to the south. Within the reserve, close to the Zambezi River, there is a luxury accommodation called Matetsi Victoria Falls.
