= List of UK hill-walking guide writers =

List of guidebook writers

This is a list of guidebook writers for the hill-walking areas of the UK.

- Alfred Wainwright produced a comprehensive set of hand-drawn guides to the Lake District and Pennine Way
- Bill Birkett
- Cameron McNeish - Scottish guidebook writer
- George & Ashley Abraham, were climber/photographers who, together with Owen Glynne Jones, started the tradition of photographic guides, though concentrating mainly on rock-climbing
- Hamish Brown
- M. J. B. Baddeley wrote guidebooks in the early 1900s (after the style of Baedeker?) His Lake District volume continued in revised editions into the late 1960s
- W. A. Poucher developed the photographic guide to upland areas in the early 1960s
- Walt Unsworth co-founder of Cicerone Press
- The Scottish Mountaineering Club produces a set of 8 District Guides covering both the Scottish Highlands, Skye & Islands, and the hills of lowlands
