= George Abraham =

George Abraham may refer to:

- George Abraham (1871–1965), British climber and photographer, see George and Ashley Abraham
- George Abraham (poet), Palestinian American poet
- G. P. Abraham (George Perry Abraham, 1846–1923), British photographer, postcard publisher, and mountaineer
- George Abraham, founding chairman of the World Blind Cricket Council and the Association for Cricket for the Blind in India
