= Enid J. Wilson =

- Born: 1905; Keswick
- Died: 31 July 1988
- Occupation: Diarist

Enid J. Wilson (1905-31 July 1988) was a Lakeland contributor to The Guardian "Country Diary" column from 1950 to 1988. She was the daughter of George Abraham the photographer/climber and Winifred Davies, a botanist and cousin of the Abrahams' climbing partner, Owen Glynne Jones.

Her Enid J. Wilson's country diary won the Lakeland Book of the Year in 1989.
