= JKA =

JKA may refer to:

- Japan Karate Association
- The FAA code for Jack Edwards Airport
- JKA Foundation, regulating cycle and motorcycle racing in Japan
- Jamal Khashoggi Award for courageous journalism
- J.K.A., a pen-name of John K. Adams
