= Brabbs =

Brabbs is a surname. Notable people with the surname include:

- Derry Brabbs, British photographer and writer, father of Olivia
- Olivia Brabbs, British photographer, daughter of Derry Brabbs
- Mark Brabbs, member of British heavy metal band Tank in 1980-1983 and 2009
- Peter Brabbs, member of British heavy metal band Tank in 1980-1983
