= Janet Elizabeth Case =

British classical scholar

Janet Elizabeth Case (1863–1937) was a British classical scholar, tutor of ancient Greek, and women's rights advocate.

== Early life and education ==
Case was born in Hampstead, London, in 1863, to William Arthur Case and Sarah Wolridge Stansfeld; she was the youngest of their six daughters. She was educated at Heath Brow, a co-educational school in Hampstead, and later studied classics at Girton College, Cambridge from 1881 to 1885, where she obtained a first in Part II of the tripos at a time when women were still denied a full degree from Cambridge; in 1907 she converted this to a Master of Arts when Trinity College, Dublin began to offer degrees to women who had qualified at Oxford and Cambridge.

In 1884 Case co-founded Girton College's classical club; she was an active participant in Cambridge productions of ancient Greek drama, taking the role of Electra in a Girton college production of 1883, and Athena in Aeschylus' Eumenides in the Cambridge Greek Play of 1885. She was the first female actor in the annual Cambridge Greek Play, an exception to the practice of using only male actors at that time; she was the only woman to be a cast-member of the Greek Play until 1950. Her performances in the plays made such an impact that she featured, dressed in Greek costume, in two illustrations of the first issue of The Woman's World. In her obituary in The Times, Virginia Woolf would later describe Case as "a noble Athena, breaking down the tradition that only men acted in the Greek play."

== Career ==
After leaving Cambridge, Case taught Classics from 1887 to 1896 at Maida Vale High School, as well as offering private tuition. Her support for the engagement of women with education in classical drama continued, as she sponsored the performances of Greek Plays at Bedford College for Women, which became the first women's college to host such a performance in 1887. While working as a tutor, she taught Greek to a young Virginia Woolf from 1902 to 1907. After this instruction ended, Case and Woolf developed a close friendship that would last until Case's death in 1937. Woolf wrote Case's obituary, which was published in The Times on 22 July 1937.

Case published her translation of Prometheus Bound by Aeschylus in 1905. Her work on both the Prometheus Bound and Aeschylean plays more generally was connected to her social activism, as she saw potential for Prometheus to be seen as a revolutionary text, and also wrote a feminist analysis of women in Aeschylus. The Girton Review described her translation as "both scholarly and graceful", recognising both Case's expertise and her desire to make the text accessible to a wider audience.

From 1925 to 1937 she wrote a weekly "Country Diary" column for the Manchester Guardian, which was published as a collection in 1939. Suffering from ill health, she had given up teaching in 1915, aged 52; she died of cancer in 1937.

== Activism ==
Case became involved in the women's rights movement, thanks to her friend and former Girton classmate Margaret Llewelyn Davies, who served as general secretary of the Co-operative Women's Guild from 1899 to 1921. Case advised the Guild on divorce law reform, publishing a 1912 pamphlet summarising the royal commission's recommendations on divorce and advocating a proposal of the Guild that female assessors should be appointed to the divorce court. Case also encouraged Virginia Woolf to become involved in the women's rights movement, writing to her in 1910 about the "wrongness of the present state of affairs."
