= Margaret Olive Milne-Redhead =

British artist and botanical illustrator

- Born: 17 September 1904; Woodbridge, Suffolk, England
- Died: 21 September 1997 (aged 93)
- Other names: Olive Shaw, Margaret Olive Shaw
- Occupation: Illustrator

Margaret Olive Milne-Redhead (17 September 1904 – 21 September 1997) was an artist and botanical illustrator known as Olive Shaw and Margaret Olive Shaw.

She was born at Woodbridge, Suffolk, the daughter of Agnes Margaret (née Airy) and Herbert Alfred Shaw. Her older brother was botanist Herbert Kenneth Airy Shaw (1901−1985). In 1933, she married botanist Edgar Milne-Redhead (1906−1996), a friend of her brother's, and thereafter she was known as Margaret Olive Milne-Redhead.

She was a member of the Ipswich Fine Art Club from 1926 to 1930, recognized as an oil painter. A 1927 exhibition in Woodbridge in 1927 showed three oils by Shaw titled Molly, Maimie, and The Mighty Hunter.

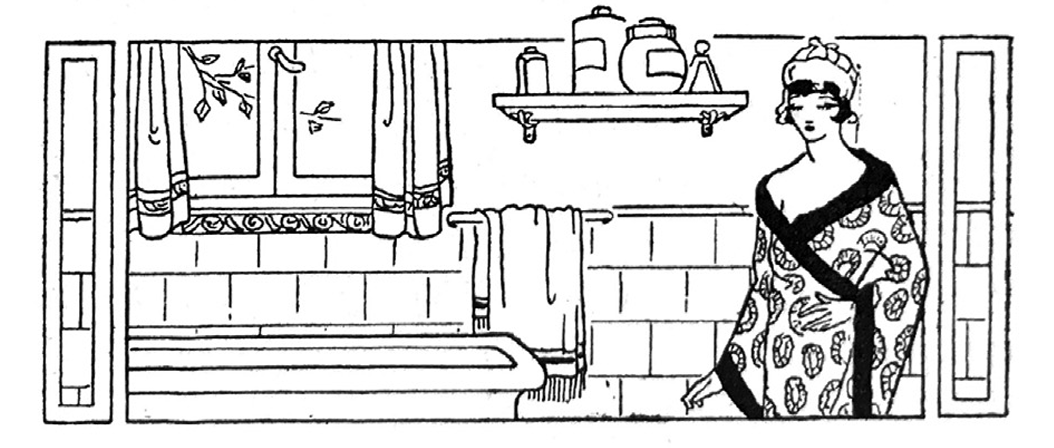
Illustration by Olive Shaw for Eve's Beauty Secrets (1926)

Under the name Olive Shaw, she contributed over thirty pen illustrations to Eve's Beauty Secrets, a beauty primer written by W. A. Poucher in 1926, which outlined cleansing and cosmetic regimens for women. Laudatory reviews in the women's pages of newspapers also cited Shaw's illustrations as contributing to the overall effect of the “pleasing production”. The book was instrumental in launching Poucher to a long and successful career with the House of Yardley.

Milne-Redhead's botanical illustrations appeared in the Kew Bulletin from the 1940s to 1960s. Her illustrations contributed to the ongoing botanical project to record the plant species of Uganda, Kenya, and Tanzania, which resulted in Flora of Tropical East Africa. Her husband recorded 161 new names for the volumes.

She died at Colchester, Essex on 21 September 1997.

== Publications ==
W. A. Poucher. Illustrated by Olive Shaw. Eve's Beauty Secrets. London: Chapman & Hall, 1926.
