= M. J. B. Baddeley =

Distinguished English guidebook writer/late 19th/early 20th century

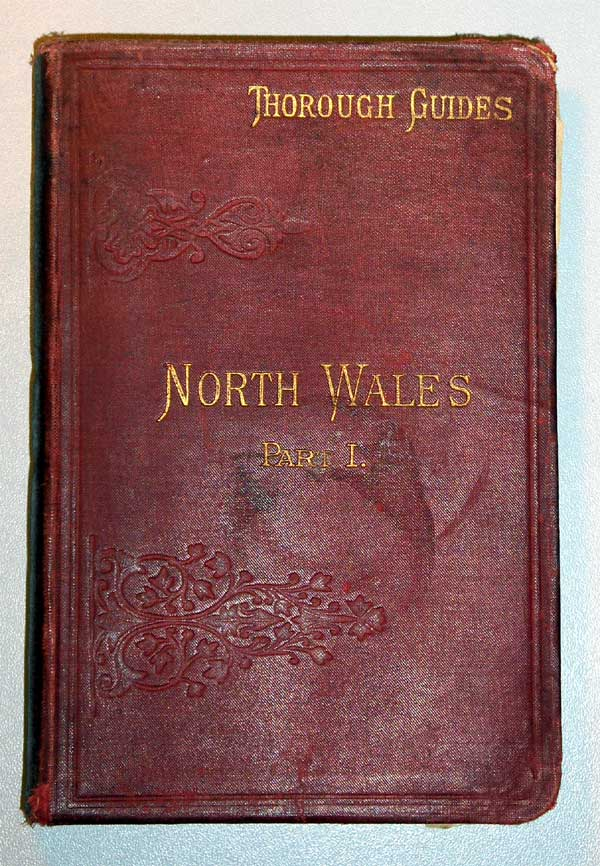
1895 edition of the Thorough Guide to North Wales

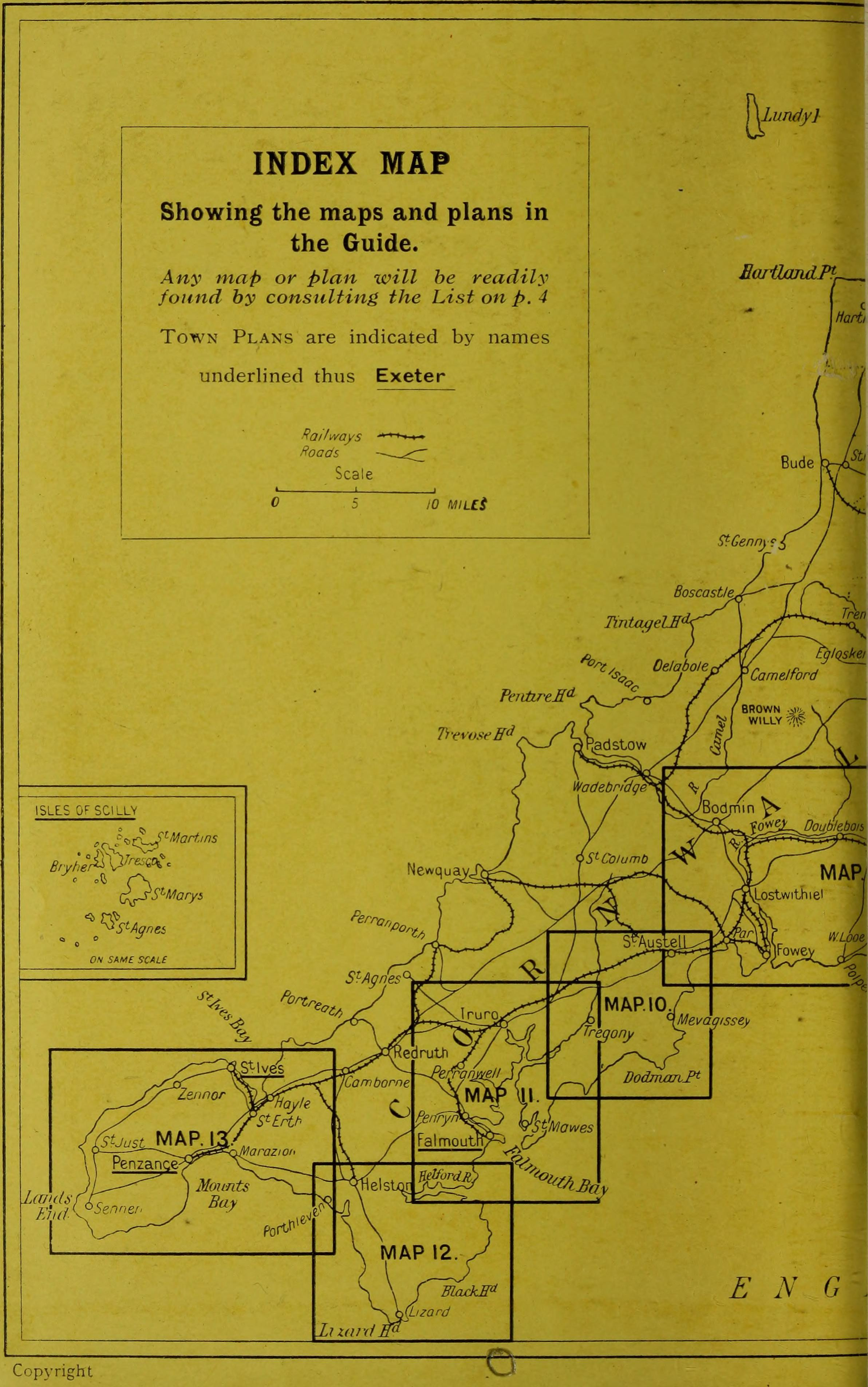
South Devon and South Cornwall, with a full description of Dartmoor and the Isles of Scilly (1900); index map

Mountford John Byrde Baddeley (1843–1906) was an English guidebook writer of the late 19th and early 20th century. His guides appeared in the 'Thorough Guide' series, edited by Baddeley and his colleague, Charles Slegg Ward, (Note: Baddeley held a B.A. degree and Ward an M.A.) and included guides to Scotland (parts I to IV: The Highlands; Northern Highlands; The Lowlands; and Orkney & Shetland), Devon and Cornwall (north, and south), the Peak District of Derbyshire, the Eastern Counties, Wales (north Wales, parts I & II; south Wales), Ireland (part I: northern division; part II: southern division), Surrey & Sussex, Yorkshire (parts I & II: East; West), Bath and Bristol and 40 miles (64 km) round, Isle of Wight. (These volumes were numbered I - XIX and had appeared by 1908. South Hants and Dorset was published in 1914 and ascribed to Baddeley on the spine but written by W M Baxter. They included "maps by Bartholomew" and were published by Thomas Nelson & Sons, London.

== Biographical summary ==
Baddeley was born in Rocester, Staffordshire in 1843, the son of a solicitor. He was educated at King Edward's School, Birmingham and Clare College, Cambridge. He then worked as a classics master at Somersetshire College, Bath and Sheffield Grammar School (1880-1884) before retiring from teaching and moving to the Lake District, first to Windermere and then Bowness-on-Windermere. As well as writing guide books, he was an active member of the Lake District Association. He married Millicent Satterthwaite Yeates in 1891. There were no children.

== Lake District guide ==
His Lake District guide (titled Thorough Guide to the English Lake District, Dulau & Co, first edition 1880) was particularly highly thought of. It continued to be revised and reissued, and remained in print into at least a 26th edition (1978, edited by R. J. W. Hammond).

The guidebook was largely text-based, with maps by John Bartholomew. Compared with later photographic volumes directed mainly at rock-climbers and hill-walkers, produced by the Abraham Brothers and by W. A. Poucher, and the highly detailed hand-illustrated guides of Alfred Wainwright, Baddeley's guide was more general, giving motoring and accommodation advice and low-level walks as well as outline guides to walks on the fells.

== Other works ==
Baddeley also wrote a Latin coursebook for schools entitled Auxilia Latina (1875).

== Legacy ==
Baddeley is commemorated by the 'Baddeley clock' in Windermere
