= Molly Lefebure =

British writer

Molly Lefebure FRSL (6 October 1919 – 27 February 2013) was a British writer with an interest in the English Lake District and the Lake Poets.

== Early life ==
Molly Lefebure was born in the London Borough of Hackney on 6 October 1919, the daughter of Charles Hector Lefebure OBE (1941 Birthday Honours) and Elizabeth Cox. Charles Lefebure's family was descended from prominent arms manufacturers in 18th-century Paris. He was a senior civil servant who worked with Sir William Beveridge on the establishment of the National Health Service, applying some of the revolutionary ideas of Robespierre, the Parisian Lefebures having professed Jacobin sympathies.

Some of Lefebure's forebears had been men of letters. One of them, Pierre Lefebure, helped to set up the Institut Français, and became a professor of languages at the newly formed University of London. Her uncle was Major Victor Lefebure (OBE, Chevalier of the Legion of Honour and Officer of the Crown of Italy) who, on 5–6 October 1916, carried out one of the most successful cylinder gas attacks of World War I, on the French front at Nieuport. He was a British chemical liaison officer with the French until the war closed, and wrote The Riddle of the Rhine: Chemical strategy in Peace and War.

During childhood summers on a remote farm on Exmoor, arranged by her maternal grandmother, Lefebure learned to hunt. Molly Lefebure was educated at the North London Collegiate School, and went on to study at King's College London where she met her future husband, John Gerrish.

== Career ==
During World War II she worked as a reporter for a London newspaper and met the pathologist Dr Keith Simpson. Despite initial hesitation, she became his secretary for almost five years, during which time she gained the information for her first book Evidence for the Crown, which became the inspiration for the 2003 BBC Radio 4 Saturday Play "Murder on The Home Front" and the 2013 two-part ITV drama Murder on the Home Front, a title used for the book when it was republished in 1990. Lefebure was the first woman ever to work at Southwark mortuary, and she became known as 'Molly of the Morgue' by Scotland Yard detectives.

Lefebure wrote on hunting for both The Field and Country Life, and was a member of the Blencathra Hunt in the Lake District for more than 50 years.

Lefebure was a Coleridge scholar, and among her 20 or so other books was a 1974 biography of the poet, subtitled The Bondage of Opium, which followed a six-year study of drug addiction at Guy's Hospital in London. She also wrote a study of Coleridge's wife, The Bondage of Love (1986), which won Lefebure the Lakeland Book of the Year award. This was followed by a study of the Coleridge children, The Private Lives of the Ancient Mariner. She also wrote several novels, and two studies of drug addiction under the name Mary Blandy, an 18th-century forebear who was convicted of poisoning her father.

Lefebure's children's books include illustrations by her friend, the famous Lakeland author, hill walker and illustrator Alfred Wainwright. She appeared in a 2007 BBC documentary about Wainwright.

She was elected a Fellow of the Royal Society of Literature in 2010.

== Personal life ==
Lefebure and John Gerrish married at Marylebone in 1945, after he returned from active service in India. They lived by the river at Kingston-upon-Thames and had two children. In 1957 they bought a house, "Low High Snab", in Newlands Valley, Cumbria, where Lefebure wrote many of her books.

== Bibliography ==
- Evidence for the Crown: Experiences of a Pathologist's Secretary, London: W. Heinemann, 1955; Philadelphia and New York: J-B. Lippincott Company, 1954, 1955, also published as Murder on the Home Front: The Unique Wartime Memoirs of a Pathologist's Secretary, London etc.: Grafton Books, 1990, ISBN 0-586-20854-2
- Murder with a Difference: The Cases of Haigh and Christie, London: W. Heinemann, 1958
- The English Lake District, London: B.T.Batsford Ltd, 1964
- Scratch and Co – The Great Cat Expedition, with drawings by A. Wainwright, London: Victor Gollancz, 1968; New York: Meredith Press, 1969, ISBN 978-0-9547213-1-2; Blackburn: Mountainmere Research, 2006, ISBN 0-9547213-1-4
- Cumberland Heritage (Chapters include Camden, Braithwaite, Millbeck, Fellwalkers, Carlisle Canal, Armboth, John Peel (Farmer) and The Blencathra), with endpaper maps of old Cumberland, London: Gollancz, 1970, ISBN 0-575-00376-6
- The Hunting of Wilberforce Pike, illustrated by A. Wainwright, London: Victor Gollancz, 1970
- The Loona Balloona, Nashville, Tennessee: Thomas Nelson Inc., 1974, ISBN 0-8407-6378-6
- Samuel Taylor Coleridge: A Bondage of Opium, New York: Stein and Day, 1974, ISBN 0-8128-1711-7 and London: Victor Gollancz, 1974, ISBN 0-575-01731-7
- Cumbrian Discovery, London: Victor Gollancz, 1977, ISBN 0-575-02235-3
- The Bondage of Love – A Life of Mrs Samuel Taylor Coleridge; London: Victor Gollancz, 1986, ISBN 0-575-03871-3
- The Illustrated Lake Poets, 1987, ISBN 0-7112-0477-2
- Blitz!, London: Victor Gollancz, 1988, ISBN 0-575-04306-7, also published as We'll Meet Again, London etc.: Grafton Books, 1990
- Thunder In The Sky, London: Victor Gollancz, 1991 ISBN 0261669990
- Thomas Hardy's World: The Life, Times and Works of the Great Novelist and Poet, London: Carlton Books Ltd, 1997 ISBN 1-85868-245-2
- Private Lives of the Ancient Mariner: Coleridge and his Children, The Lutterworth Press (2013), ISBN 9780718893002.
