= A. Harry Griffin =

British journalist

Arthur Harry Griffin MBE (15 January 1911 – 9 July 2004) was a British journalist and mountaineer. He was born in Liverpool and raised in Barrow-in-Furness.

His career as a newspaper reporter began with the Barrow Guardian, then the Lancashire Evening Post before joining the Daily Mail in Manchester in 1937.

At the start of World War 2 he joined the British army, working in intelligence in India and Burma. Attaining the rank of lieutenant-colonel, he became a staff officer to Lord Mountbatten.

He resumed working for the Daily Mail after demob, then returned to the Lancashire Evening Postas northern news editor, in Kendal.

Griffin is particularly remembered for his evocative recording, in his writing, of rock-climbing in the Lake District in the inter-war years, especially a group called 'The Coniston Tigers' which he founded; for his long-running 'Lakeland Diary' column in The Guardian (starting on 8 January 1951 and spanning a period of 53 years); and for having inspired, via these columns, and an article in the Lancashire Evening Post, the rebirth of interest in the Bob Graham Round.

Fuller details of his life, including his wartime service as an intelligence officer, may be found in the Guardian obituary. He was friends with Alfred Wainwright but somewhat disapproved of the damage to the fells that the popularity of Wainwright's guides could cause.

== Bibliography ==
(In print)

Griffin, A. H. (2000) The Coniston Tigers, Sigma Press, (foreword C. Bonington)
Griffin, A. H., ed M. Wainwright (2005) A Lifetime of Mountains, Aurum Press - edited collection of extracts from the Guardian's Country Diary
Griffin, A. H., ed. P. Hardy (2008) The High Places: Leaves from a Lakeland Notebook, Frances Lincoln.
Griffin, A. H., ed. P. Hardy (2011) Heritage of Lakeland: A Centenary Collection, Frances Lincoln.

(Out of print)

Griffin, A. H. (1961) Inside the Real Lakeland, Guardian
Griffin, A. H. (1961) In Mountain Lakeland, Guardian
Griffin, A. H. (1966) Pageant of Lakeland, Robert Hale
Griffin, A. H. (1968) The Roof of England, Robert Hale
Griffin, A. H. (1970) Still the Real Lakeland, Robert Hale
Griffin, A. H. (1975) Long Days in the Hills, Robert Hale
Griffin, A. H. (1975) A Lakeland Notebook, Robert Hale
Griffin, A. H. (1976) A Year in the Fells, Robert Hale
Griffin, A. H. (1978) Freeman of the Hills, Robert Hale
Griffin, A. H. (1980) Adventuring in Lakeland, Robert Hale
Griffin, A. H. (1990) A Lakeland Mountain Diary, Crowood Press
