= Country Diary =

Country Diary is a daily natural history column in the English newspaper The Guardian, first published in November 1906. It is also now freely available on the newspaper's website. Past and present contributors include John K. Adams, Arnold Boyd, Janet Case, Mark Cocker, Thomas Coward, Ka Cox, Harry Griffin, Jim Perrin (as James Perrin), Sarah Poyntz, Arthur Ransome, Helena Swanwick, and Enid J. Wilson.

Since the 1990s, the paper edition of the column has been illustrated by Clifford Harper.

== Jizz ==
The column is credited with the first use in print of the term "Jizz", in a piece by Thomas Coward of 6 December 1921, subsequently included in his 1922 book "Bird Haunts and Nature Memories". He attributed it to "a west-coast Irishman".

== Bibliography ==
A number of books, compiling past columns, have been published, including:

- Boyd, A. W. (1946). The Country Diary of a Cheshire Man. Collins.
- White, John T. (1974). A Country Diary - Kent. illustrated by Percy F. C. White. Cassell. ISBN 0-903253-04-6.
- Wilson, Enid J. (1988). Enid J. Wilson's Country Diary. Illustrated by Pavla Davey. Hodder and Stoughton. ISBN 0-340-41522-3.
- Griffin, A. Harry (1990). A Lakeland Mountain Diary. Crowood Press. ISBN 1-85223-565-9.
- A Country Diary. Selected by Jeanette Page (various contributors, foreword by Melvyn Bragg). Guardian Books/ Fourth Estate. 1994. ISBN 1-85702-254-8.
- Collier, Ray; Baxter, Colin (1997). Highland Country Diaries. ISBN 1-900455-28-5.
- Poyntz, Sarah (2000). A Burren Journal. Illustrated by Gordon D'Arcy and Anne Korff. Tír Eolas. ISBN 1-873821-13-1.
- Harper, Clifford (2003). A Country Diary. Agraphia Press. ISBN 1-904596-00-2. (36 of Harper's drawings, plus an essay by Richard Boston)
- Wainwright, Martin (2004). A Good Year for Blossom: A Century of the Guardian's Women Country Diarists. ISBN 9780852651018.
- A Lifetime of Mountains: The Best of A. Harry Griffin's 'Country Diary' A. Harry Griffin (edited by Martin Wainwright, foreword by Chris Bonington), Aurum Press Ltd., (2005), ISBN 1-84513-112-6
