= Winifred Davies =

English schoolteacher and rock climber

Winifred Ellen Davies, later Mrs. George D. Abraham (died 1939) was an English schoolteacher and rock climber.

== Life ==
Winifred Davies was the daughter of David Davies and a niece of the sculptor William Davies (Mynorydd). She was a cousin of the climber Owen Wynne Jones, who trained her to climb. She was educated at the University of Wales and the University of London, where she graduated in 1891 with a first-class degree in botany. After a year at the University of Cambridge, she then became headmistress of Carlisle High School and later science mistress at the Mary Datchelor School.

She met her future husband, George Dixon Abraham (1871-1965), on a climbing holiday in North Wales. During their honeymoon she became the first woman to make the ascent of Crowberry Ridge. George and his brother Ashley were climber-photographers, who collaborated with Owen Wynne Jones in his popular Rock Climbing in the English Lake District (1897). After Jones died, George Abraham published Rock Climbing in North Wales (1906) and other books under his own name, though in fact Winifred "ghosted George Abraham's numerous books on the basis of her husband's rough notes".

She died in 1939, aged 68, in Keswick. She was survived by her husband and two daughters, one of whom was the journalist Enid J. Wilson.
