= Eric Robson =

British broadcaster

Eric Bell Robson OBE DL (born 31 December 1946) is a Scottish television broadcaster, author and documentary film maker who has lived for most of his life in Cumbria, where he has a sheep farm. For many years he was the main presenter of Brass Tacks.

== Early life ==
Robson was born in Scotland and attended Carlisle Grammar School in Carlisle, Cumberland.

== Career ==
Robson started at Border Television (based in Carlisle) in 1966. In the 1980s and 90s he was also a reporter on the BBC Scotland Landward show. He has been a sheep farmer since 1987. On 20 February 1994 he became the principal chairman of BBC Radio 4's Gardeners' Question Time programme, but announced on 20 March 2019 that he would be handing over his chair to Kathy Clugston, a BBC newsreader and continuity announcer, on 3 May 2019.

Robson had earlier contributed to various regional TV series about Alfred Wainwright's walking guides. In 1980 he presented the final episode of the first series of Great Railway Journeys of the World, produced by the BBC.

In 2011, he was accused of a conflict of interest by anti-nuclear protesters opposed to a second generation of nuclear power plants and the possible siting of a high-level waste dump in the Lake District. Robson is the chairman of the Cumbria Tourism organisation, but at the same time is a part owner of Osprey Communications, a PR firm that is advisor to the West Cumbria Managing Radioactive Waste Safely Partnership. He is also a Deputy Lieutenant of Cumbria.

Robson was appointed Officer of the Order of the British Empire (OBE) in the 2021 New Year Honours for services to tourism as honorary president of Cumbria Tourism.

== Personal life ==
He was chairman of the Wainwright Society until 2024, and made a series of TV programmes with Alfred Wainwright in the mid-1980s that looked back over the reclusive writer's life. He lives in Wasdale, where he farms at Crag House Farm and (with his wife) runs a mail order company named after Striding Edge, specialising in DVDs, maps and books about the countryside, particularly that of Cumbria.

He married Mary Armstrong in 1976, but they divorced in 1984. They have a son and daughter. He married Annette Steinhilber in 1988. They have a son and two daughters, one grandson and three granddaughters.

== Books ==
- Co-author, Great Railway Journeys of the World (BBC)
- Editor, The Allotment Handbook (Arena Press)
- Author, Outside Broadcaster (autobiography), 2007 (Frances Lincoln Ltd)
