= W. A. Poucher =

British photographer and chemist

William Arthur Poucher (1891–1988), known as Walter, a nickname he acquired during his Army service, was one of the leading British mountain photographers and guide book writers during and following World War II. He personally explored and photographed all the routes he describes in his famous mountain guides, so that users can be assured of correct directions. His guides were based on earlier books covering most of the mountainous regions of Britain, but exclude routes on less popular mountains such as the Berwyns in north Wales, and are restricted in areas such as the Black Mountains and Brecon Beacons. He was an accomplished and skilled photographer. He joined the Royal Photographic Society in 1940, achieving Associateship in 1941 and Fellowship (FRPS). He was awarded Honorary Fellowship in 1975.

He was also a leading researcher who specialised in the chemistry of perfumes, cosmetics and soaps.

== Regional books ==
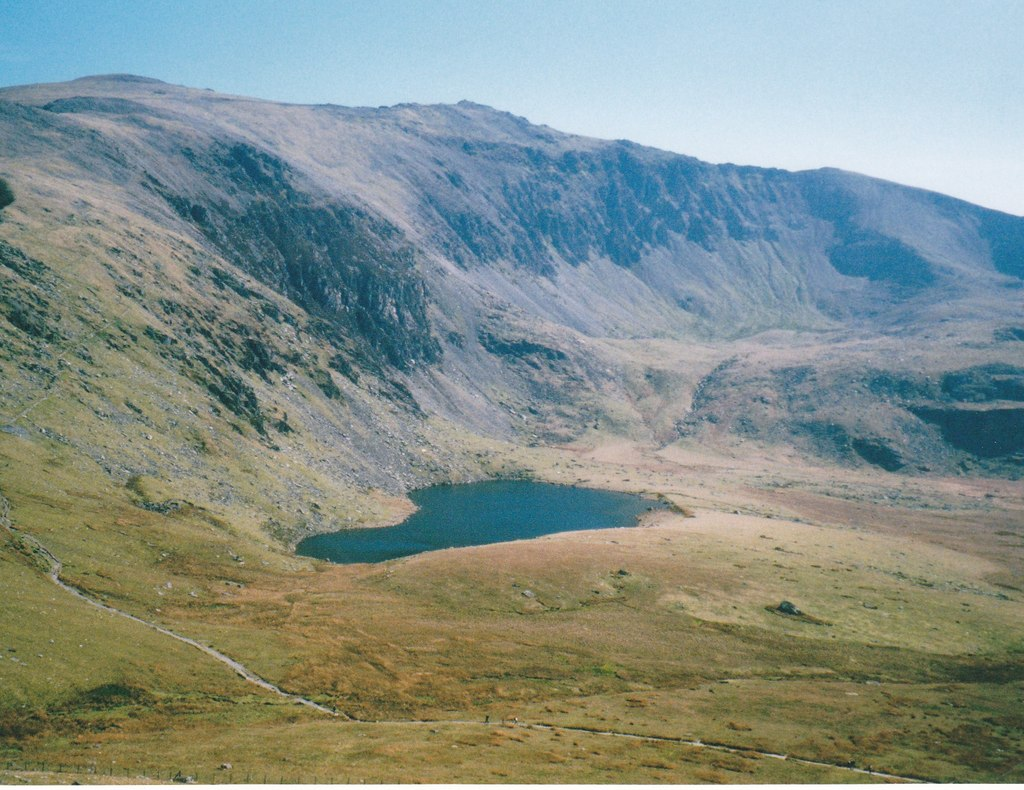
The Snowdon Ranger Path (foreground) crosses a boggy area before ascending past Llyn Ffynnon-y-gwas.

Scrambling on Crib Goch, Snowdonia, Wales

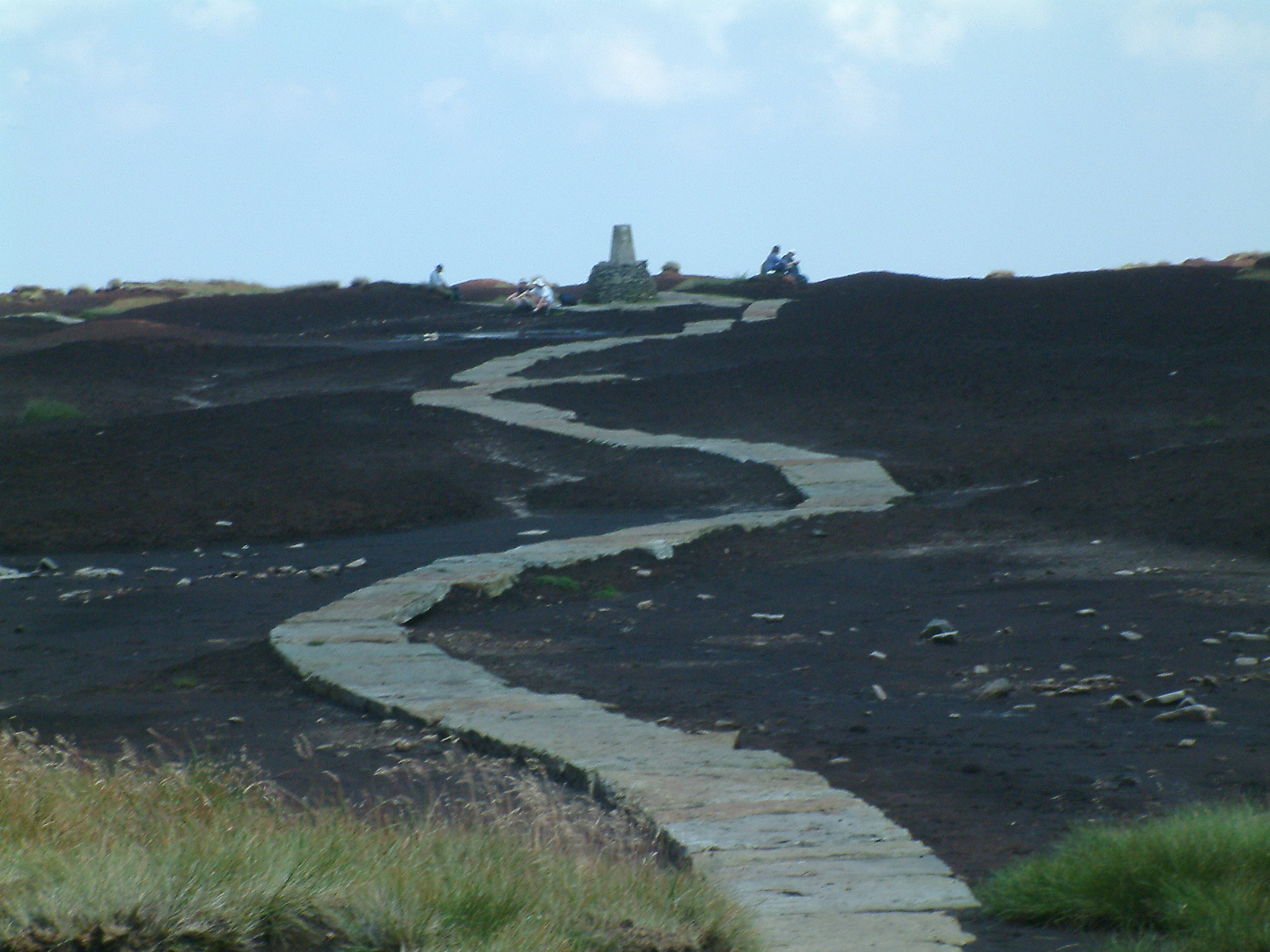
Pennine Way near Black Hill summit

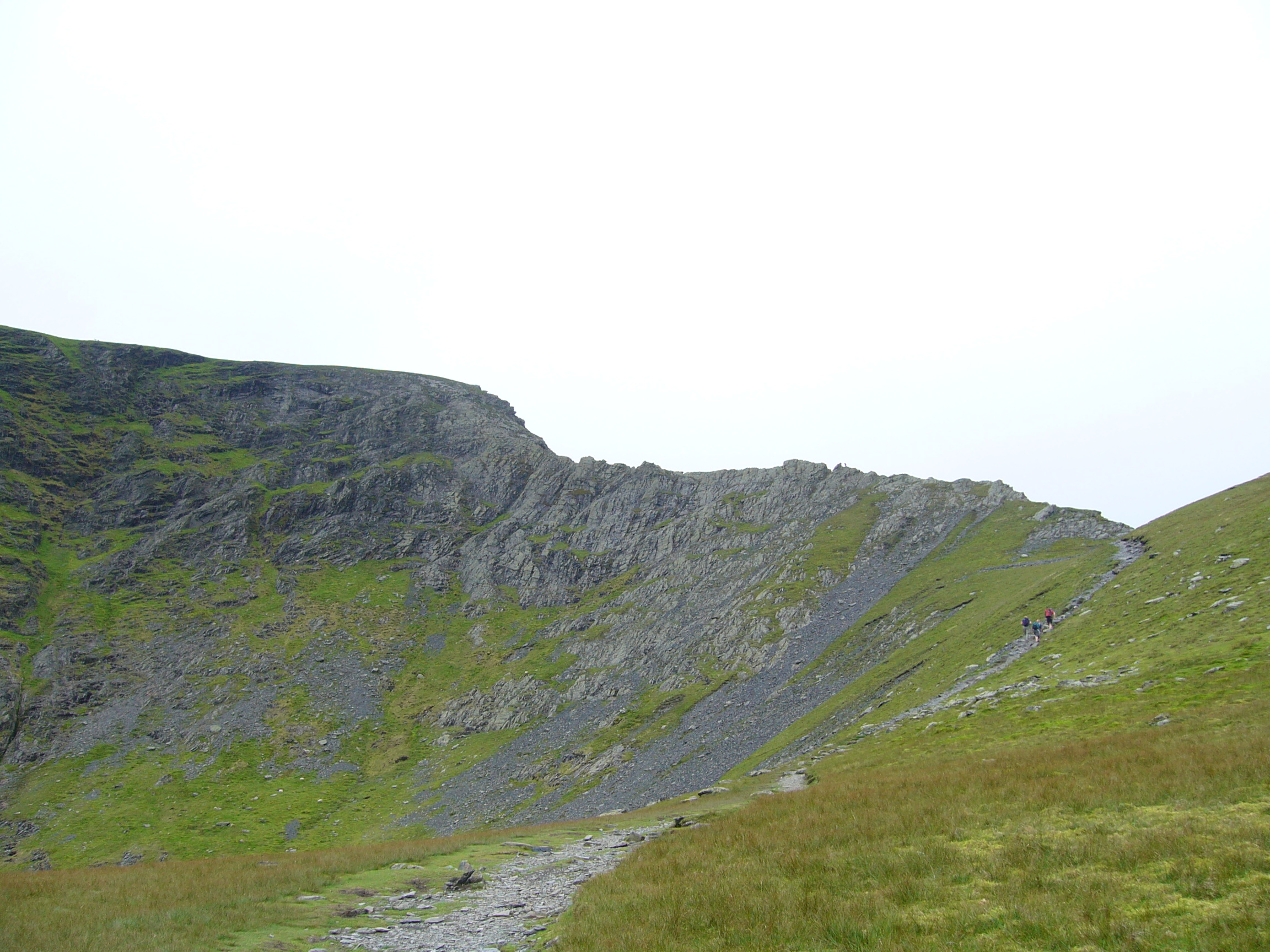
Sharp Edge on Blencathra in the Lake District

Poucher first started writing during the Second World War with large format (quarto) well illustrated volumes on various regions in Britain, such as

- Lakeland through the Lens (Chapman & Hall, 1940)
- Snowdonia through the Lens (Chapman & Hall, 1941)
- Lakeland Holiday (Chapman & Hall, 1942)
- Snowdon Holiday (Chapman & Hall, 1943)
- Scotland through the Lens: Loch Tulla to Lochaber (Chapman & Hall, 1943)
- Escape to the Hills (Country Life, 1943)
- Highland Holiday: Arran to Ben Cruachan (Chapman & Hall, 1945)
- The Backbone of England (Country Life, 1946)
- Peak Panorama: Kinder Scout to Dovedale (Chapman & Hall, 1946)
- A Camera in the Cairngorms (Chapman & Hall, 1947)
- Over Lakeland Fells (Chapman & Hall, 1948)
- The Surrey Hills (Chapman & Hall, 1949)
- Wanderings in Wales (Country Life, 1949)
- The Magic of Skye (Chapman & Hall, 1949)
- Watch it, Sailor! (Chapman & Hall, 1949)
- Lakeland Scrapbook (Chapman & Hall, 1950)
- The Magic of the Dolomites (Country Life, 1951)
- Journey into Ireland (Country Life, 1953)
- The North-West Highlands (Country Life, 1954)
- West Country Journey (Country Life, 1957)
- The Highlands of Scotland (Constable, 1983)
- The Alps (Constable, 1983)
- The Yorkshire Dales & the Peak District (Constable, 1984)
- The Magic of the Highlands (Constable, 1987)

== Mountain guides ==
He used such volumes as the basis for his pocket guides to selected regions, with route instructions for most of the named peaks in the area. The books followed those of the Abraham Brothers in being exhaustively illustrated with the author's own photographs (usually in black and white). His habit in later volumes of drawing the route of ascent in white on the photograph was helpful for route-finding. Landmarks are important for route-finding, especially where paths are indistinct (as on many Scottish hills), and he advises on important features to look for on the paths he describes. They include cairns, standing stones, bothies, distinctive rock formations, panoramas, views and natural features such as cascades and waterfalls. He also warns of problems to be aware of on more challenging paths (such as the "bad step" on the climb up to Crib Goch). He generally used a Leica for his photography, and gave details of his methods in the pocket guides, together with friendly advice on hillwalking and scrambling.

Each guide includes a list of the principal peaks and details of towns and villages useful for supplies, and closest points of access to the routes. Important national footpaths such as the Pennine Way are mentioned. He includes advice on essential equipment such as clothing including anorak or cagoule, compass, aneroid barometer, map, rucksack and climbing boots (the most important item), and when necessary, ice axe. Tweed is preferable to corduroy or cotton, and he personally prefers plus fours. Woollen clothing, especially pullovers or sweaters are also useful, and external clothing should be coloured red for visibility. He mentions hobnailed boots in one volume (The Lakes), but they are no longer available, having been displaced by the lighter vibrams with serrated rubber soles. To conserve heat, he recommends either a Bob-cap or balaclava, while a string vest is advisable to prevent heat loss in the cold. Essential foods included sweets for energy and water to prevent dehydration.

He describes the skills needed, such as map reading, prevention of accidents and precautions to counter hypothermia. The problems of inclement weather in the hills are discussed and advice given on weather forecasting as well as anticipating hazardous conditions, especially fog and mist, but also rain and snow. A whistle is an essential when seeking help, while a torch is vital should darkness fall when on the path. His guides include relevant maps and the photographs of key parts of the routes he describes. Some natural phenomena encountered in the hills, such as the Brocken spectre and glory are briefly mentioned.

Poucher's guides include:

The Welsh Peaks (1962)
The Scottish Peaks (1965)
The Lakeland Peaks (1960)
The Peak and Pennines (1966)
The Magic of Skye (1949, new edition 1980)

== Routes ==
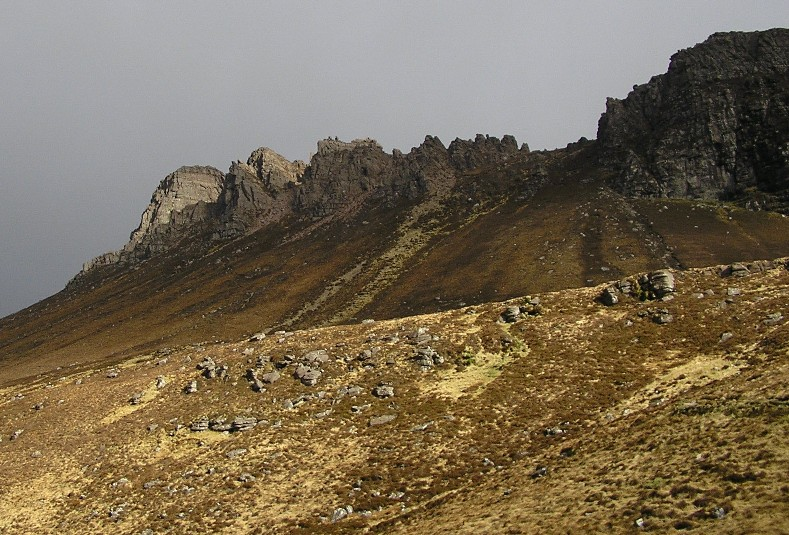
The rocky crest of Stac Pollaidh

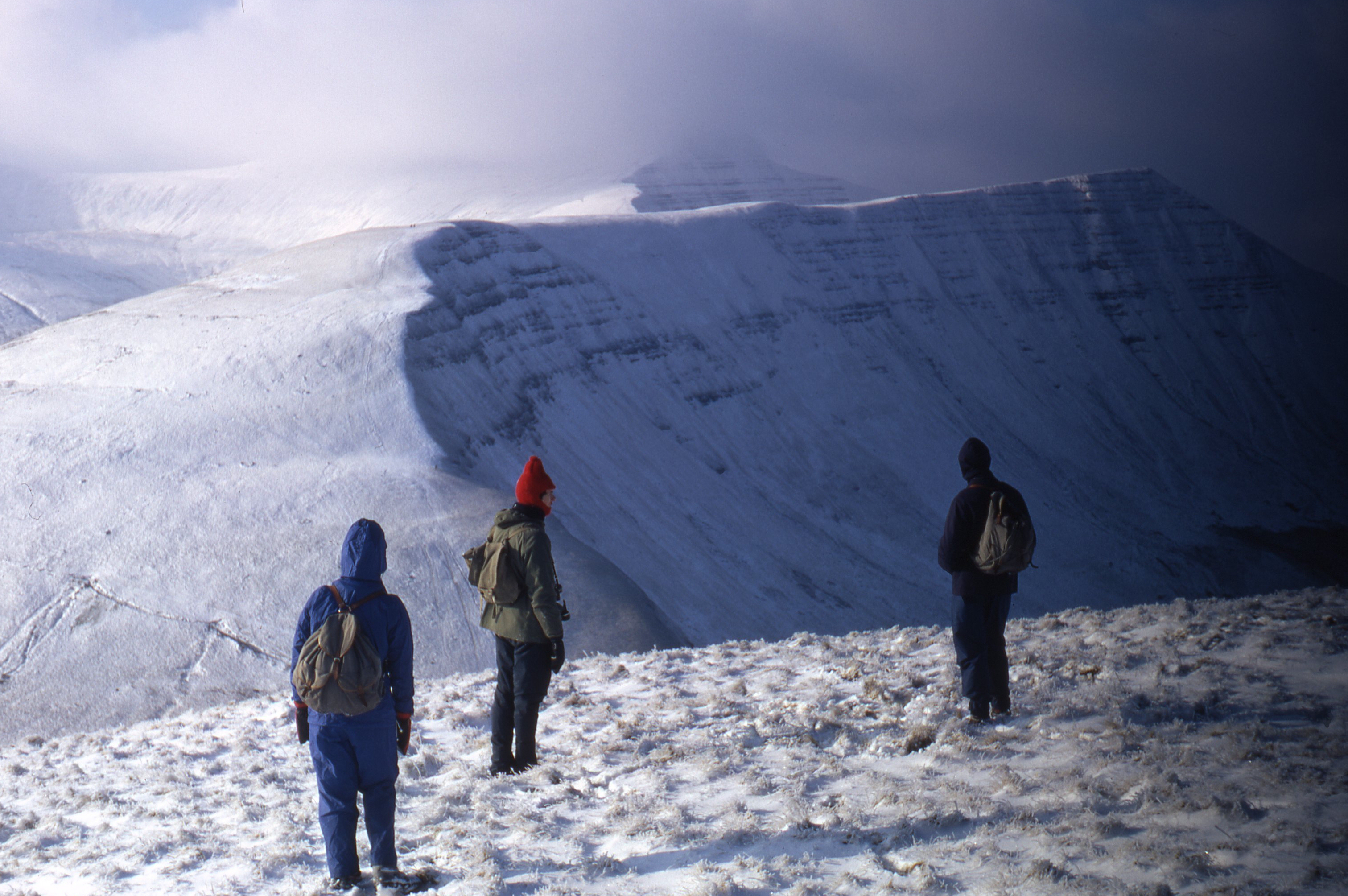
The Brecon Beacons in winter

In all these books, he provides routes up the major peaks, and many minor ones as well, not being totally obsessed with peak bagging, but rather the interest and enjoyment of a particular route. So the route on Stac Pollaidh in Wester Ross is described in detail, despite being only about 2,000 feet (600 metres) in height, for example. The crest of the ridge presents many interesting scrambling diversions, including at least one bad step before the final peak. A bad step is an awkward point in a scramble where hand support is needed. Bad steps are also usually exposed to steep drops below, so need a good head for heights.

However, the routes described are necessarily limited to well-known paths, such as the Pyg track on Snowdon or the traverse of Kinder Scout in the Peak District, and walkers can vary their routes according to choice or need. The limited scope of his guides is clear from the Wales volume, which has few routes in the Brecon Beacons or Black Mountains for example. The routes in that volume are concentrated in Snowdonia and North Wales, where rock exposure is much greater than in the south or central areas of the country. Notable omissions include the Berwyns or Clwydian hills however, both ranges of mountains to the east of Snowdonia, which have many interesting routes to their summits. Likewise there are no paths described in Shropshire such as the Stiperstones, The Wrekin, Caer Caradoc or the Long Mynd. The Welsh borders is not considered at all.

There are no routes described for the Cheviots, a hilly region in the Scottish Borders and Northumberland. And all coastland paths, many of which are exposed and rocky, are omitted from the guides, . Such routes and other in less mountainous regions are described however, in the many guides to the National Trails in Britain, such as that to the Pennine Way published by HMSO and written by Tom Stephenson.

Later volumes of these works, updated in consultation with his son, John, remain in print as paperbacks by Frances Lincoln Publishers (who also publish the many Lakeland walking guides by Alfred Wainwright) .

On the basis of the success of these guides, Poucher encouraged his publishers (Constable) to publish selections of rock-climbs in each area, in a similar photographic format.

== Tourist guides ==
Poucher went on to create a series of coffee table books using high-quality colour photography. They included travel guides to the West Country, Scotland, Ireland and Wales.

== Perfumery ==
Poucher was a research chemist by profession, working on the chemistry of perfumes. His 1923 textbook Perfumes, Cosmetics and Soaps has been revised and reprinted over the years and is now in its 10th edition. He was frequently given leave of absence by Yardley for part of the year to pursue his mountain photography. His profession caused some amusement in climbing circles, where he was occasionally described as "a perfume salesman who wears his wares". Poucher appeared as a guest on Russell Harty's BBC chat show in November 1980 wearing makeup, perfume and ladies' gloves. This was incidentally the same edition of Harty's show that included Grace Jones' infamous physical attack on the host. Poucher was the guest to whom Harty was talking when he appeared to keep turning his back to her.

In May 2012 Poucher was the subject of a BBC Radio 4 programme The Perfumed Mountaineer presented by geographer Hayden Lorimer.

== Perfumery books ==
- Perfumes, Cosmetics and Soaps: with Special Reference to Synthetics, vol. 1, London: Chapman & Hall, 1923
- Perfumes, Cosmetics and Soaps: Production, Manufacture and Application of Perfumes, vol. 2, London: Chapman & Hall, 1923
- Eve's Beauty Secrets. Illustrated by Olive Shaw (Margaret Olive Milne-Redhead). London: Chapman & Hall, 1926.
- The Production, Manufacture and Application of Perfumes, London: Chapman & Hall, 1975
- Modern Cosmetics, London: Chapman and Hall, 1975

== See also ==
- George and Ashley Abraham
- Alfred Wainwright
- M. J. B. Baddeley
- Ten Essentials
