= G. P. Abraham =

- Born: George Perry Ashley Abraham; 1846; Devizes, Wiltshire, England
- Died: 1923 (aged 76–77); Keswick, England
- Occupations: Photographer, postcard publisher, mountaineer
- Known for: Landscape photography
- Spouse: Mary Dixon
- Children: George Dixon Abraham; Ashley Perry Abraham; Sidney Abraham; John Abraham

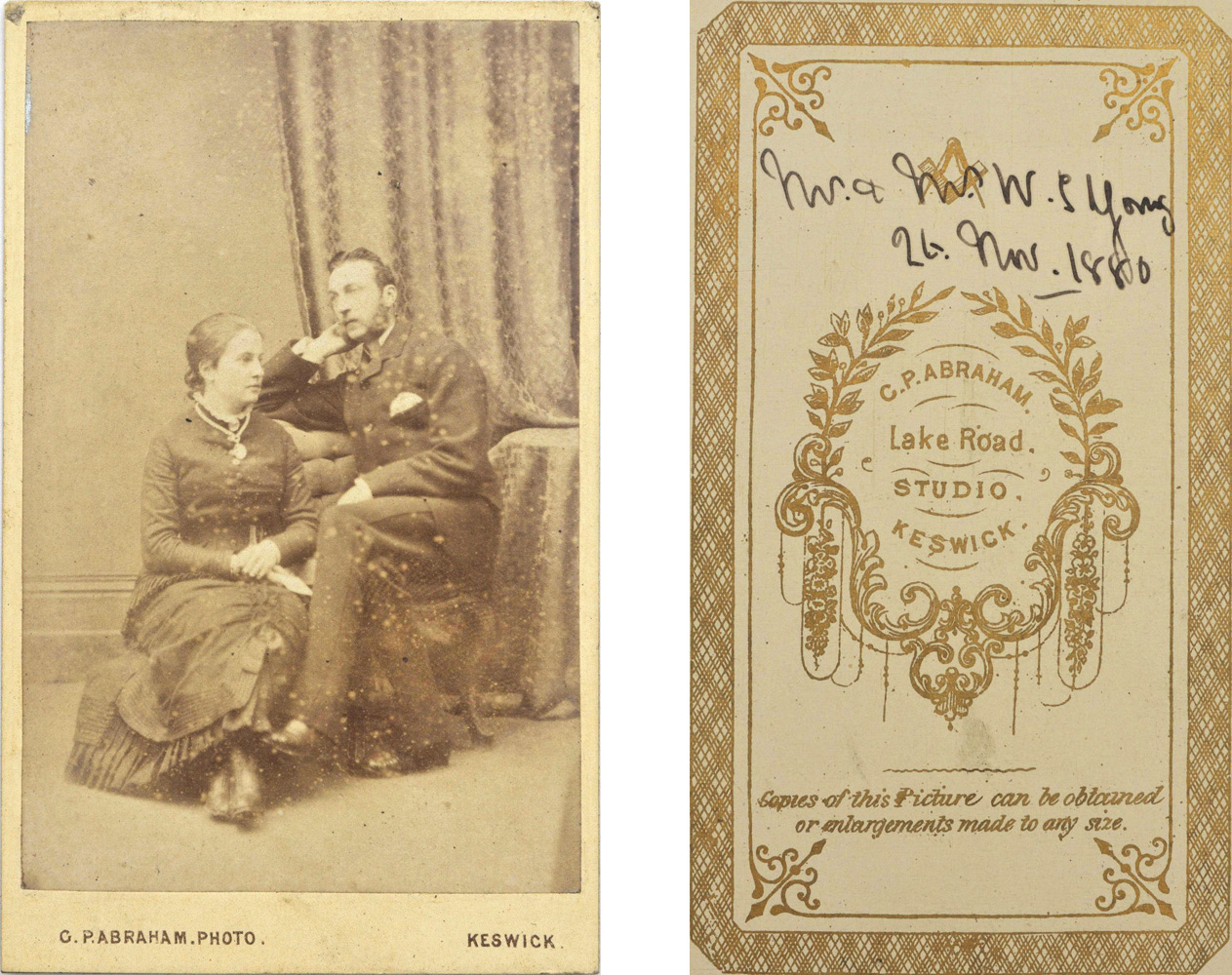
Mr & Mrs W S(?) Young, 26 November 1880, by G. P. Abraham, Keswick

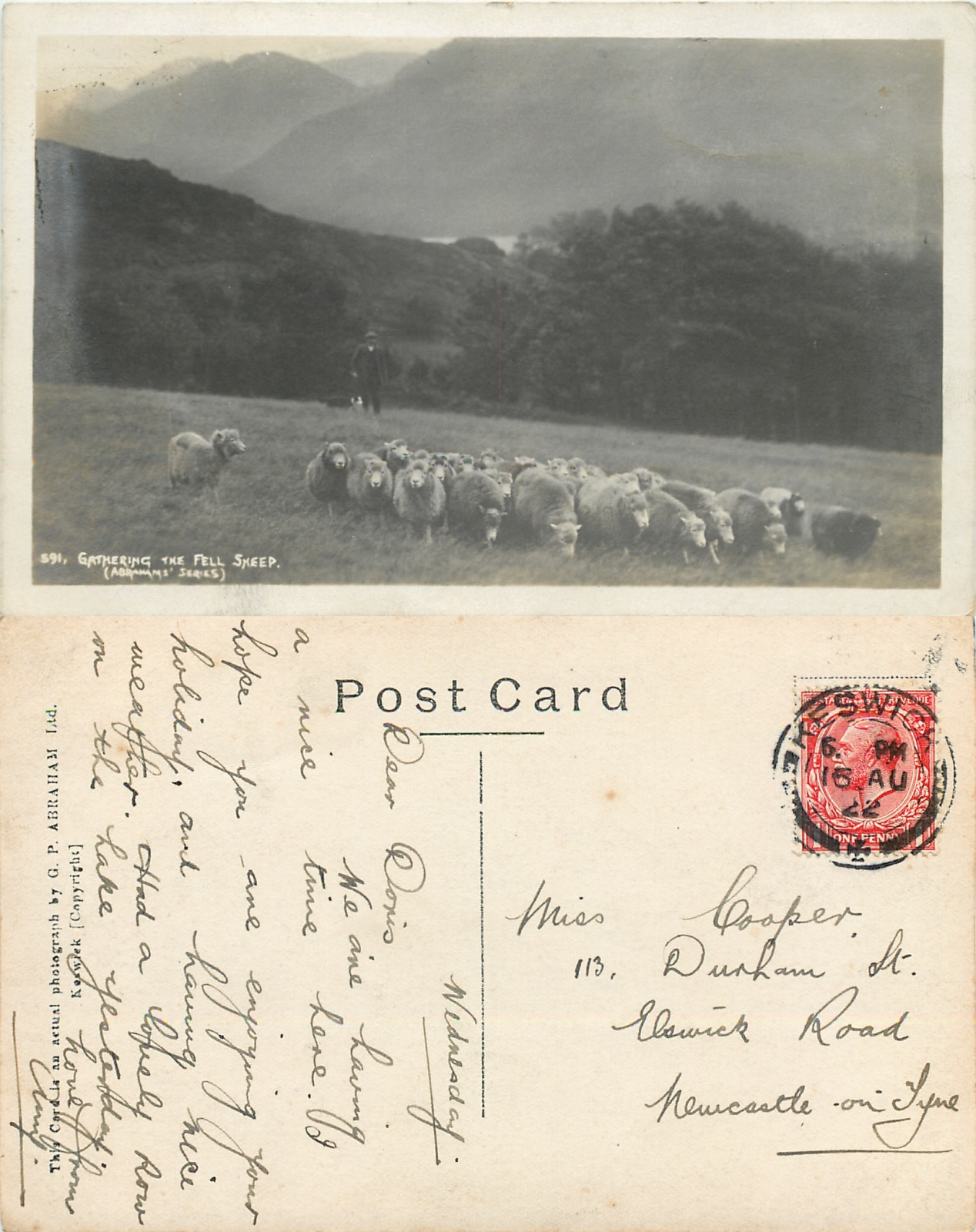
Gathering the Fell Sheep, G. P. Abraham Ltd postcard

George Perry Abraham FRPS (1846 – 10 April 1923) was a British photographer, postcard publisher, and mountaineer.

== Early life ==
George Perry Ashley Abraham was born in Devizes, Wiltshire, in 1846.

== Career ==
He worked as a photographer with Elliot & Fry of Baker Street, London, before becoming apprenticed to Alfred Pettitt in Keswick in 1862, and then starting his own business in 1866.

Abraham did studio portraits, but his passion was for photographing landscapes. He founded G. P. Abraham Ltd, a postcard publisher, in Keswick in England's Lake District, and became a Fellow of the Royal Photographic Society in 1898.

== Personal life ==
In 1870, he married Mary Dixon in Cockermouth, Cumberland.

He had four sons. The two eldest, George and Ashley Abraham, were important popularisers of mountain climbing. Sidney was a bank manager in Keswick, and John Abraham became acting Governor of Tanganyika.

Abraham died in 1923.

== Legacy ==
The photography business was carried on by Ashley's son, before being wound up in the 1970s.
