= John K. Adams =

- Adams in 1973, on the occasion of his retirement from Country Life
- Born: 3 June 1915
- Died: 23 February 2003 (aged 87)
- Alma mater: City of Oxford High School for Boys; Balliol College
- Occupation: Journalist, schoolmaster, ornithologist, writer, editor, teacher
- Employer: Country Life; Stonyhurst College; The Guardian; The Scotsman; Wellington College
- Position held: editor (1958–1973)
- Branch: Royal Air Force Volunteer Reserve

John Kenneth Adams (1915-2003) was an English schoolmaster, journalist and ornithologist, who served as editor of Country Life from 1958 to 1973.

== Early life ==
Adams was born in Oxford on 3 June 1915, the son and only child of Mabel (née Jarvis) and Thomas John Adams.

He was educated at the single-sex City of Oxford School, and at Balliol College, Oxford.

== Career ==
Adams first worked as an assistant master at Stonyhurst College, before signing up with the Royal Air Force Volunteer Reserve in 1940, during World War II. He was invalided out in 1941, and became an assistant master at Wellington College until 1944.

During that time, he began to work for The Guardian as a leader writer, although the position was never made permanent. He was then leader writer for The Scotsman until 1946, in which year he joined Country Life. He became assistant editor in 1952, deputy editor in 1956, editor in 1958 and editorial director in 1959, retiring in 1973.

He also wrote, as "J.K.A.", Country Diary columns for The Guardian, and ornithological articles for The Ibis, including an obituary for Wilfred Backhouse Alexander, also signed "J.K.A.".

He was a member of the Athenaeum Club, and of the British Ornithologists' Club , serving on their committee in 1973.

== Death and legacy ==
Adams died on 23 February 2003, his wife since 1944, Margaret (née Fortescue), having predeceased him in 2000. They had lived at West Dulwich, and had no children. An obituary was published in The Times, and he is listed in Who Was Who. A notice in The Ibis announced his death, and promised an obituary "in [a] future issue", but none seems to have been published.

His correspondence with C. P. Scott of The Guardian is archived at the University of Manchester.

In the 2020s, The Guardian re-ran some of his Country Diary columns.
