= Derry Brabbs =

British landscape photographer and author

- Born: Sheffield, United Kingdom
- Occupations: Photographer, Writer
- Website: www.derrybrabbs.com

Derry Brabbs is a British landscape photographer and author. From 1984 onwards he worked with Alfred Wainwright on a series of books, including Fellwalking with Wainwright which won the 1985 Lakeland Book of the Year.

He judged the annual photographic society of the Wainwright Society from 2003 to 2016; the 2016 winner Terry Abrams took over as judge from 2017.

In 2017 he published Pilgrimage (Frances Lincoln: ISBN 978-0711239005), after walking and photographing 10 major European pilgrim routes.

== Personal life and family ==
Brabbs was born in Sheffield, South Yorkshire. His daughter Olivia Brabbs is also a photographer.

== Selected publications ==
=== As author and photographer ===
- 2020 Great Pilgrimage Sites of Europe (Frances Lincoln: ISBN 978-0711245082) Publication October 2020
- 2017 Pilgrimage: The Great Pilgrim Routes of Britain and Europe (Frances Lincoln: ISBN 978-0711239005)
- 2013 A Year in the Life of Rutland (Frances Lincoln: ISBN 978-0711232860)
- 2010 The River Thames (Frances Lincoln: ISBN 978-0711232860)
- 2008 Hadrian's Wall (Frances Lincoln: ISBN 978-0711228573)
- 2008 The Roads to Santiago: The Medieval Pilgrimage Routes Through France and Spain to Santiago De Compostela (Frances Lincoln: ISBN 978-0711227064)
- 2007 A Year in the Life of the Welsh Marches (Frances Lincoln: ISBN 978-0711226357)
- 2005 In The Footprints of Wainwright (Frances Lincoln: ISBN 9780711224957)
- 2001 England's Heritage (W&N: ISBN 978-0304355990)
- 1999 Abbeys & Monasteries (Weidenfeld & Nicolson: ISBN 978-0297786849)
- 1998 Landmark: Cottages, Castles and Curiosities of Britain (W&N: ISBN 978-0297822998)
- 1986 English Country Pubs (W&N: ISBN 978-1841880754)
- 1985 English Country Churches (Weidenfeld & Nicolson: ISBN 978-0297786849)

=== As photographer ===
- 2014 Wainwright on the Pennine Way
- 2010 Rambler's Rewards Elizabeth Guy & Pat Kirkbride
- 2009 Coast to Coast with Wainwright
- 2006 Fellwalking with Wainwright
- 2003 Living The Past, Val Horsler
- 2002 Dickie Bird's Britain, Dickie Bird
- 2000 Timpson's Leylines, John Timpson
- 1999 James Herriot's Yorkshire Revisited, James Herriot
- 1992 Wainwright in the Valleys of Lakeland, Alfred Wainwright
- 1991 Wainwright's Favourite Lakeland Mountains, Alfred Wainwright
- 1989 Wainwright on the Lakeland Mountain Passes, Alfred Wainwright
- 1988 Rural England: Our Countryside at the Crossroads Derrik Puttnam & David Mercer
- 1988 Short Walks in English Towns, Bryn Frank
- 1988 Wainwright in Scotland, Alfred Wainwright
- 1987 Wainwright's Coast to Coast Walk, Alfred Wainwright
- 1985 Wainwright on the Pennine Way, Alfred Wainwright
- 1984 Fellwalking with Wainwright, Alfred Wainwright
- 1983 The Book of the Thames, Alan Jenkins
- 1983 Angela Rippon's West Country, Angela Rippon
- 1981 Wynford Vaughan Thomas's Wales, Wynford Vaughan-Thomas
- 1979 James Herriot's Yorkshire, James Herriot
