= Owen Glynne Jones =

19th century Welsh mountain climber

- Born: 2 November 1867; Paddington, Middlesex, England
- Died: 28 August 1899 (aged 31); Dent Blanche, Switzerland
- Known for: rock climbing, mountaineering

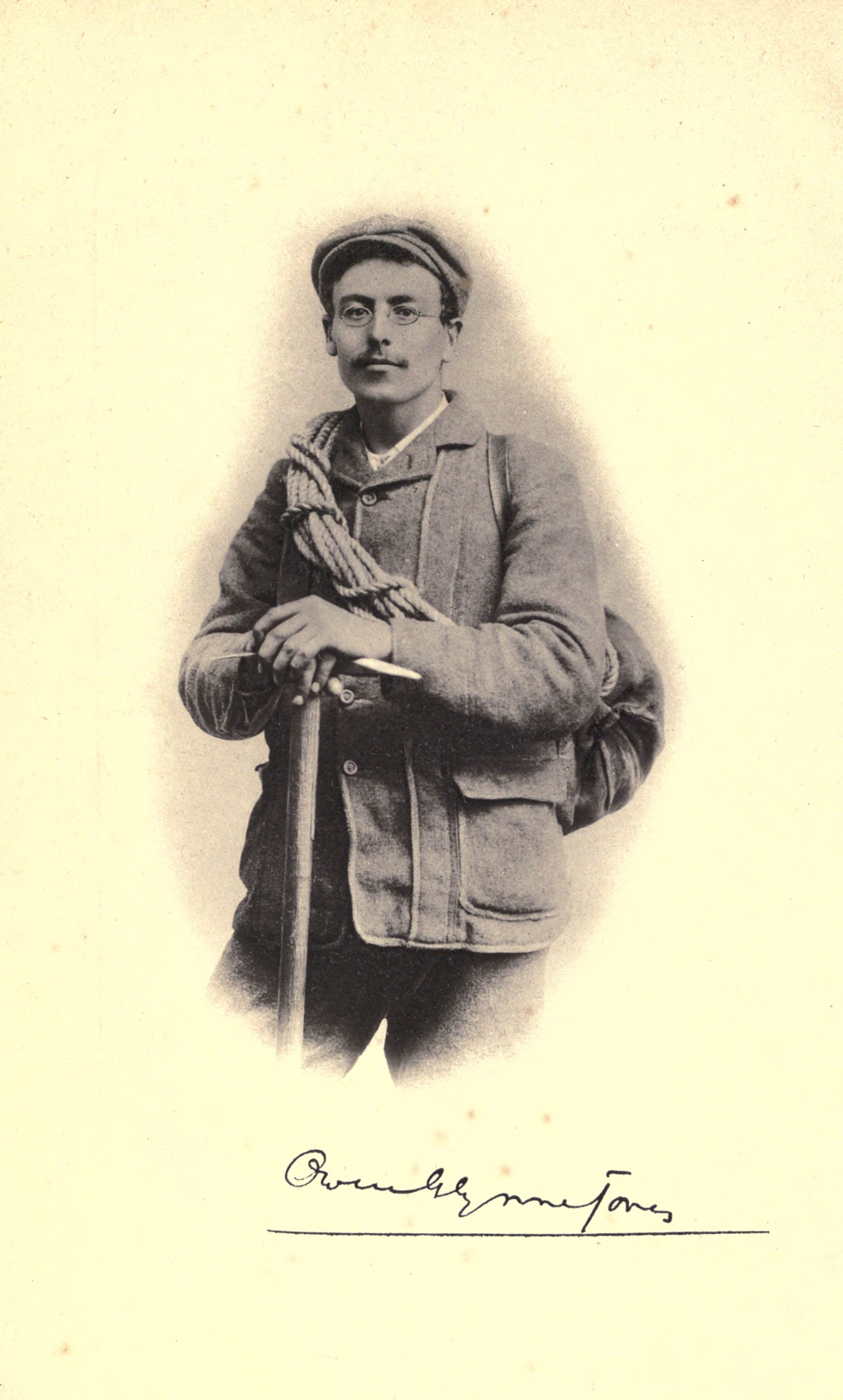
Portrait and signature of Owen Glynne Jones from his book Rock-climbing in the English Lake District

Owen Glynne Jones (2 November 1867 – 28 August 1899) was a Welsh rock-climber and mountaineer.

He established many new routes in the Lake District and elsewhere, often climbing with George and Ashley Abraham, brothers who photographed the climbs for posterity.

== Rock climbing ==
Jones was born in London, England, the son of a Welsh carpenter-builder, and took a first-class Honours degree in experimental physics. Not able to obtain a professorship, he became physics master at the City of London School. He began climbing in 1888, and was among those pioneers who first perceived rock climbing as a sport. As a climber, he had an athletic climbing style, and is considered by many to be one of the first "rock gymnasts". Although Jones said little in his writings about his training tactics – other than working with dumbbells – there are several stories regarding his gymnastic feats.

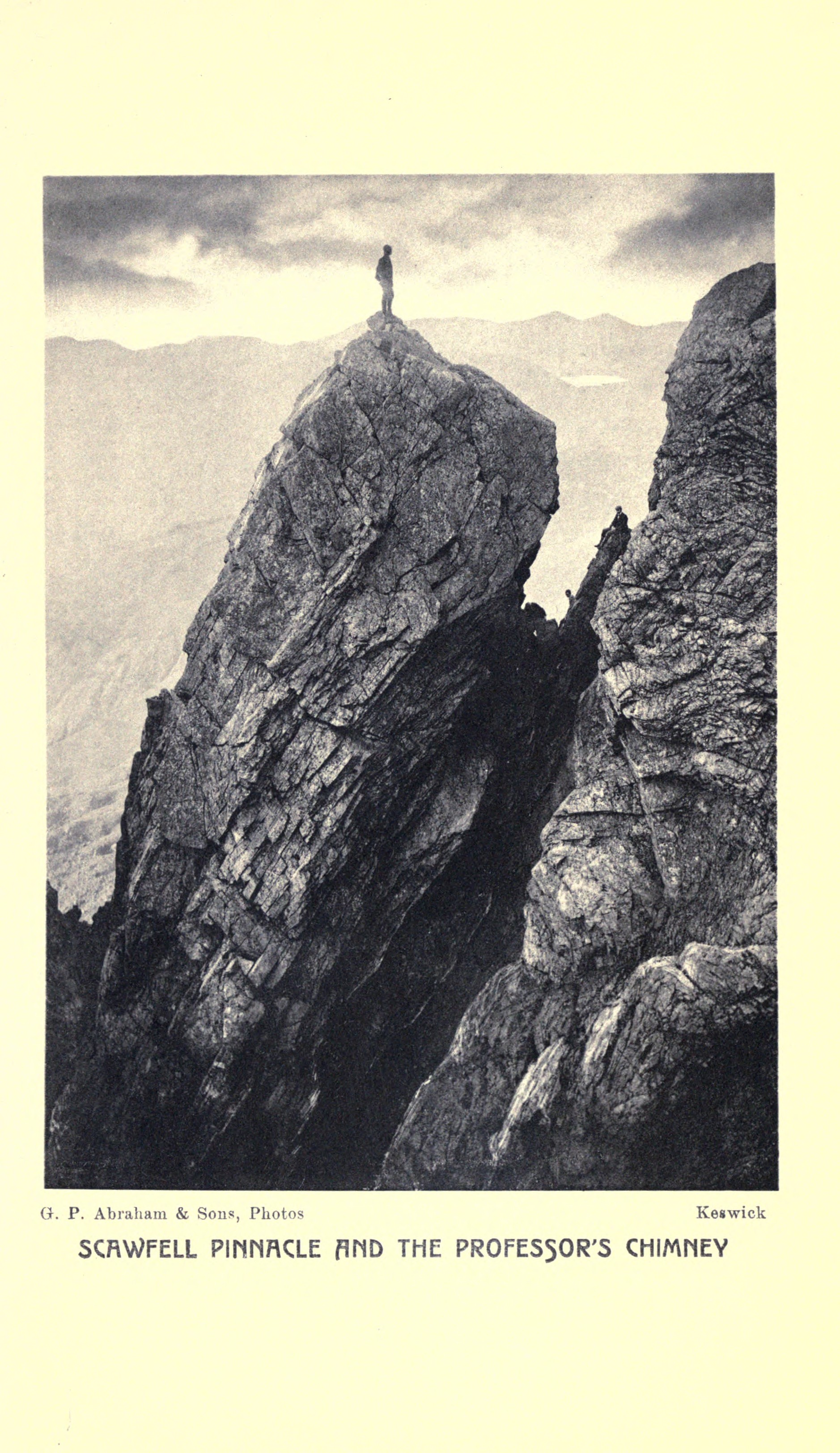
Photograph from Jones's book, Rock-climbing in the English Lake District

He jokingly called himself "the Only Genuine Jones", and was famous at Wasdale Head in the Lake District for his gymnastic stunts around the inn. As a rock climber, however, he drew disapproval from some of his colleagues – particularly Aleister Crowley – for his use of a top-rope to explore difficult pitches before attempting them (he was, nevertheless, a very daring climber. He was reputed to be fearless when climbing above a drop, though some have conjectured that this was because of his short-sightedness). Crowley also criticised his "lunging for holds", thought him a self-publicist, and was disdainful of Jones teaming up with "two photographers".

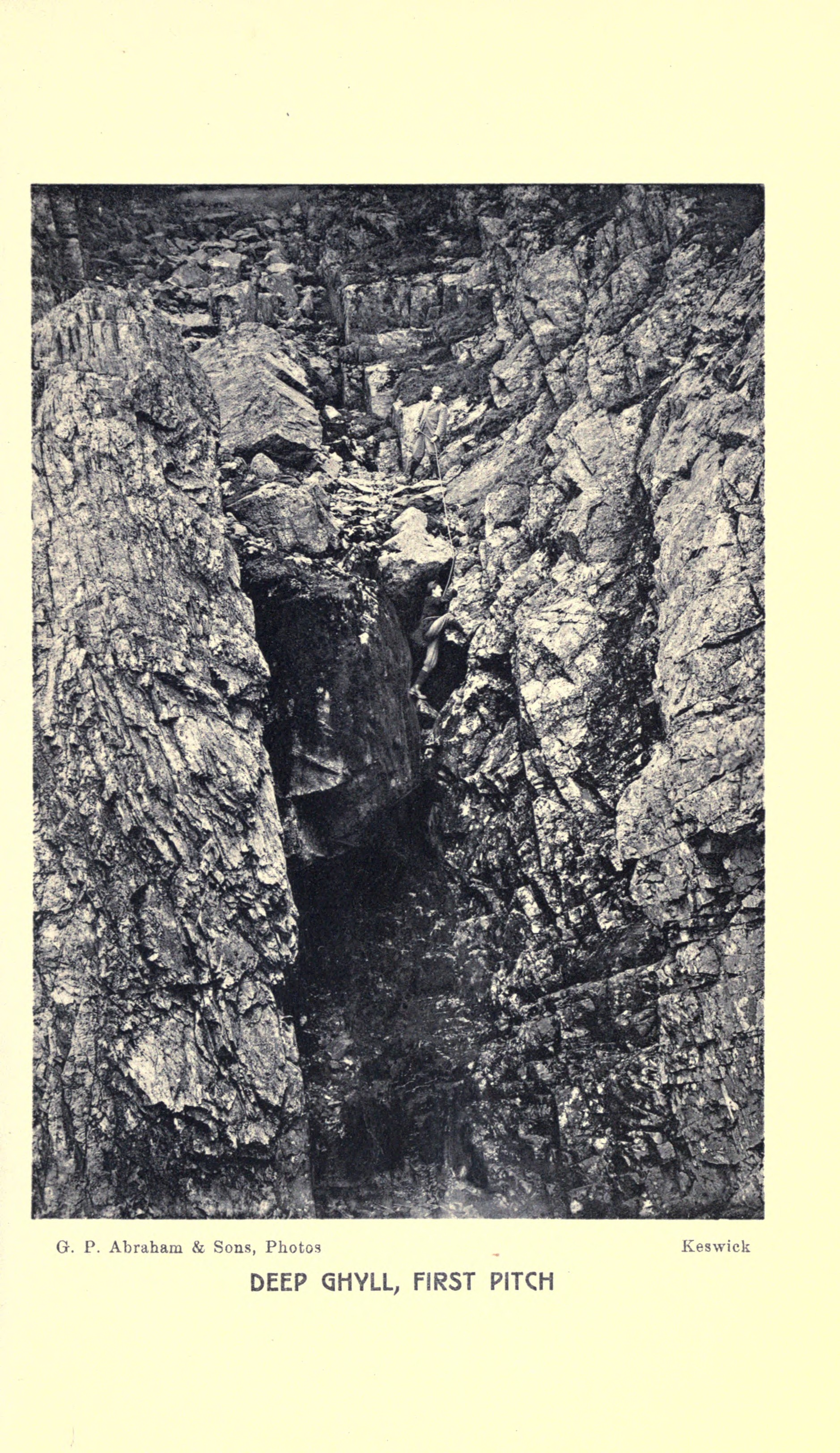
Photograph from Jones's book, Rock-climbing in the English Lake District

In 1896, Jones climbed the 70-foot Kern Knotts Crack with a top-rope. Although he used an ice axe advantageously at the bottom for a step, as well as "combined tactics" (probably a shoulder stand) – accepted practices at the time – this was an impressive ascent. The following year he led a companion up the route in proper fashion. The Crack is now graded as HVS 4c (roughly equivalent to US grade 5.7 or 5.8), and later Jones became so proficient on it he could go up the crack and down an easy chimney nearby in seven minutes. This was a benchmark climb, perhaps as difficult – though not as dangerous – as anything being done in Saxony at that time. Jones developed the forerunner of the currently used British adjectival grading system for rock climbs.

In 1897 O. G. Jones published, with George Abraham, his classic Rock Climbing in the English Lake District; Jones's exuberant style did much to popularise the sport. A facsimile of the 2nd edition (1900) is still in print.

He was killed, at the age of 32, in a climbing accident on the Ferpècle arête of the Dent Blanche in Switzerland. The guides Elias Furrer, Clemenz Zurbriggen and Jean Vuignier were also killed. The four men fell about 1,650 feet (500 m). Mr. F. W. Hill was the party's only survivor.

== References in popular culture ==
O. G. Jones features as the main character in Alex Roddie's 2012 publication 'The Only Genuine Jones'. While primarily a work of fiction it contains references to real-life events.
