= Alfred Wainwright =

English walker and writer (1907–1991)

- Born: 17 January 1907; Blackburn, Lancashire, England
- Died: 20 January 1991 (aged 84); Cumbria, England
- Occupations: Accountant; walker; writer; illustrator; cartographer
- Writing career
- Genre: Mountain topography

Alfred Wainwright MBE (17 January 1907 – 20 January 1991), who preferred to be known as A. Wainwright or A.W., was an English fellwalker, guidebook author and illustrator. His seven-volume Pictorial Guide to the Lakeland Fells, published between 1955 and 1966 and consisting entirely of reproductions of his manuscript, has become the standard reference work to 214 of the fells of the English Lake District. Among his 40-odd other books is the first guide to the Coast to Coast Walk, a 182-mile (293-kilometre) long-distance footpath devised by Wainwright which remains popular today.

== Life ==
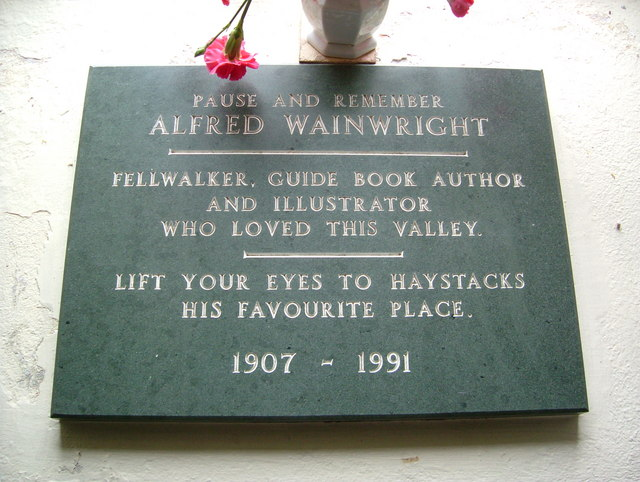
Plaque to Alfred Wainwright in Buttermere parish church

Alfred Wainwright was born in Blackburn, Lancashire, into a family which was relatively poor, mostly because of his stonemason father's alcoholism. He did very well at school (first in nearly every subject) although he left at the age of 13. While most of his classmates were obliged to find employment in the local mills, Wainwright started work as an office boy in Blackburn Borough Engineer's Department. He spent several years studying at night school, gaining qualifications in accountancy which enabled him to further his career at Blackburn Borough Council. Even when a child Wainwright walked a great deal, up to 20 miles (32 kilometres) at a time; he showed a great interest in drawing and cartography, producing his own maps of England and his local area.

In 1930, at the age of 23, Wainwright saved up for a week's walking holiday in the Lake District with his cousin Eric Beardsall. They arrived in Windermere and climbed the nearby Orrest Head, where Wainwright saw his first view of the Lakeland fells. This moment marked the start of what he later described as his love affair with the Lake District. In 1931 he married his first wife, Ruth Holden, a mill worker, with whom he had a son, Peter. In 1941 Wainwright moved closer to the fells when he took a job (and a pay cut) at the Borough Treasurer's office in Kendal, Westmorland. His first home in the town was 19 Castle Grove, which had a view of Kendal Castle from the front window.

He lived and worked in the town for the rest of his life, serving as Borough Treasurer from 1948 until he retired in 1967. His first marriage ended when Ruth left three weeks before he retired (suspecting him of infidelity) and they divorced. In 1970 he married Betty McNally (1922–2008), a divorcée, who became his walking companion and who carried his ashes to Innominate Tarn at the top of Haystacks.

Wainwright was a lifelong Blackburn Rovers fan and a founder member of the Blackburn Rovers Supporters Club. He had no time for organised religion, and was agnostic. On Desert Island Discs, he described himself as having once been shy but having grown up to be antisocial and would avoid speaking to others, even lone walkers on fell tops.

Wainwright died in 1991 of a heart attack. According to his biographer, Hunter Davies, he left everything, including his house and royalty income, to Betty. His son Peter received nothing.

== Pictorial Guides ==
Book One of the Pictorial Guide

Wainwright started work on the first page of his Pictorial Guide to the Lakeland Fells on 9 November 1952. He planned the precise scope and content of the seven volumes and worked conscientiously and meticulously on the series for the next 13 years at an average rate of one page per evening.

According to Wainwright, in his autobiography Fellwanderer, he initially planned the series for his own interest rather than for publication. When he published his first book it was privately, as he could not face the prospect of finding a publisher. His friend Henry Marshall, Chief Librarian of Kendal and Westmorland, took charge of publicity and administration, and his name appears as publisher on the early impressions. Another friend, Sandy Hewitson (of Bateman and Hewitson Ltd), agreed to print the books using Wainwright's original manuscript, although the printing was done by the Westmorland Gazette in Kendal, who had taken over Bateman and Hewitson Ltd. From 1963, the Westmorland Gazette became his publisher, and its name appears on the first impressions of Books Six and Seven. Wainwright's books were in turn taken over by Michael Joseph in the 1990s. When they ceased publication in 2003, the rights were bought by Frances Lincoln.

Between 2005 and 2009, all the Pictorial Guides were updated for the first time, to take account of changed conditions on the fells. The revisions were made by Chris Jesty, and the publishers used an imitation font of Wainwright's hand lettering to make the alterations as unobtrusive as possible. The most notable changes were the inclusion of photographs of the Lake District by Derry Brabbs on the front covers, rather than the drawings that were on the covers of the originals, and footpaths shown in red on the maps. These revised versions are titled 'Second Editions'. Revised editions of Wainwright's other Pictorial Guides, A Coast to Coast Walk, The Outlying Fells of Lakeland, Pennine Way Companion, Walks in Limestone Country and Walks on the Howgill Fells were published by Frances Lincoln between 2010 and 2014, with the amendments again being made by Chris Jesty.

The publishers announced in 2014 that Clive Hutchby, the author of The Wainwright Companion, was working on the third edition of the Pictorial Guide, with the first volume, The Eastern Fells, published on 26 March 2015 followed by The Far Eastern Fells on 8 October 2015. These revised versions are titled 'Walkers Editions'. Subsequent volumes in the series to have been revised are The Central Fells (published 2016), The Southern Fells (2017), The Northern Fells (2018); The North Western Fells (2019); and The Western Fells (2020).

== Later works ==
Wainwright followed the Pictorial Guides in 1968 with the Pennine Way Companion, applying the same detailed approach to Britain's first long-distance footpath. This was for many years a leading guide to the Pennine Way, rivalling the official guide book by Tom Stephenson. Wainwright's book consists of a continuous strip map of the route with accompanying commentary, with an unusual quirk: because the route goes from south to north (bottom to top on a map), contrary to normal reading order, the map and commentary start at the bottom of the last page and work upwards and backwards towards the front of the book. The guide was prepared with the aid of four helpers (Harry Appleyard, Len Chadwick, Cyril Moore and Lawrence Smith) and its preparation was affected by the major outbreaks of foot and mouth disease in 1966 and 1967, which closed access to many of the moors.

In 1972 Wainwright devised the west–east Coast to Coast Walk, as an alternative to the north–south Pennine Way. The Coast to Coast, he declares in his guidebook, which follows the same format as the Pennine Way Companion, "puts the Pennine Way to shame" for scenic beauty, variety and interest. The 190-mile (310-kilometre) route traverses the north of England from St. Bees to Robin Hood's Bay, passing through the Lake District, the Yorkshire Dales and the North York Moors national parks.

The Outlying Fells of Lakeland (an idea he had previously rejected), published in 1974, was his last major guidebook. Thereafter he concentrated on sketchbooks of larger-size line drawings until his eyesight began to fail in the mid-1980s. His Ex-Fellwanderer, an autobiographical work published in 1987, was intended to be his last written work, but he continued to lend his name and some written commentary to a series of "coffee table books" featuring the photography of Derry Brabbs.

== Television and radio ==
By the mid-1980s Wainwright was a TV personality; he featured in three television series for the BBC, presented by farmer and broadcaster Eric Robson and devised, directed and produced by Richard Else.

A BBC documentary about Wainwright's life was broadcast on Sunday 25 February 2007 on BBC Four, before a four-part series of walks. This first series covered Blencathra by Sharp Edge, Castle Crag, Haystacks and Scafell Pike from Seathwaite.

The second series, broadcast in 2007, included Catbells, Crinkle Crags, Helm Crag, Helvellyn from Patterdale, High Street from Mardale and Pillar. A six-part series entitled Wainwright Walks: Coast to Coast was broadcast on BBC Four in April and May 2009 and on BBC2 from 21 July 2009, and presented by Julia Bradbury.

A Granada TV series Wainwright Country included Eagle Crag, Great Calva, Knott Rigg, Pike O'Blisco, Stybarrow Dodd, Thornthwaite Crag and Yewbarrow.

In 2010, Eric Robson presented a BBC Radio 4 documentary called "The Man behind the Mountains" (16 October 2010).

Wainwright Walks Series One was released on DVD in June 2007 and Series Two was released in January 2008. Wainwright Walks: Coast to Coast was released on DVD in June 2009.

In October 2025, BBC Radio Cumbria broadcast an episode in the Secret Cumbria series titled "Secret Wainwright", which included archive recordings of Wainwright, and interviews with friends and associates.

== Influence ==
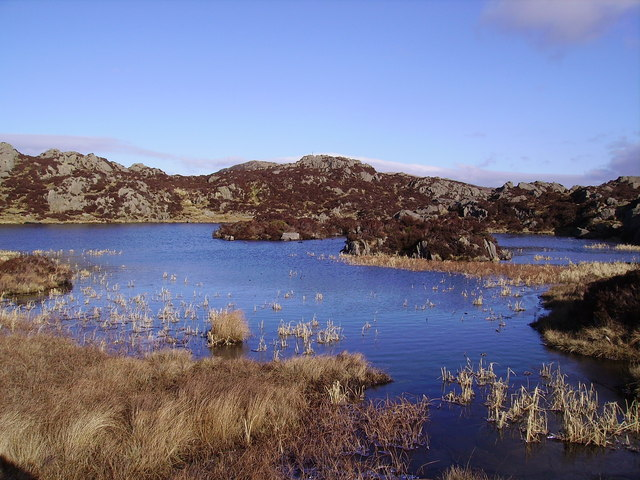
Innominate Tarn on Haystacks, Wainwright's favourite fell, where his ashes were scattered.

Wainwright's Pictorial Guides have been in continuous publication since they were written and have sold more than two million copies. Although a number of more up-to-date guides are on the market, his books remain among the most popular for their depth, detail and unique style. His division of the Lake District into seven areas, and choice of fells to include, have been followed in whole or in part by subsequent writers such as Mark Richards. The Coast to Coast Walk is one of the most popular long-distance footpaths in the United Kingdom despite its lack of official status, and has spawned various guidebooks by other authors. In 2003 it was voted the second best walk in the world in a survey of experts conducted by Country Walking magazine. The popularity of Wainwright's books of drawings and large-format photographic books has not matched that of the guides.

The 214 fells described in the Pictorial Guides are now generally known as the Wainwrights, and visiting them all is a common form of peak bagging. The Long Distance Walkers Association maintains a register of walkers who have completed the Wainwrights; as of 2013 there were 674 people on the list, of whom 40 had completed more than once; by March 2023 the figure had risen to 898. Dave Hewitt estimates that the total number of completers could be over 50% higher than the LDWA's figure. The Ramblers Association reported in 2008 that a boy of six years, four months and 27 days had become the youngest person to complete the Wainwrights. In April 2009 a boy aged five completed the round and became the third member of his family to do so after his older sisters held the 'Youngest 214 Completer' previously. Wainwrights On The Air is a scheme whereby amateur radio enthusiasts aim to make contact with or from the Wainwright summits.

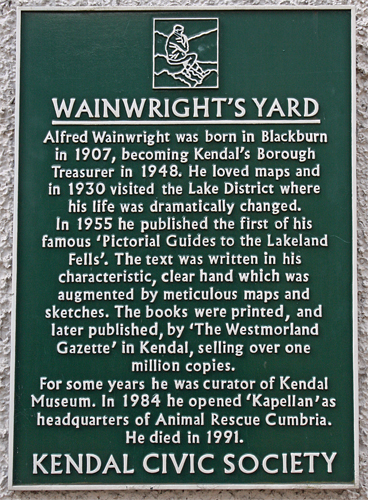
Plaque in Wainwright's Yard, Kendal

Wainwright was a supporter of animal rights and explained that the publisher of his books gave most of the profits from his books to animal charities. In 1972 he became chairman of Animal Rescue Cumbria, and donated enough money to enable the foundation in 1984 of Kapellan, a shelter for stray cats and dogs in Kendal. After his death the society was renamed "Animal Rescue Cumbria – The Wainwright Shelter".

The Wainwright Society was inaugurated in 2002, with the aim of keeping alive the fellwalking traditions and ideas promoted by Alfred Wainwright through his guidebooks and other publications.

On 27 June 2008 a landmark road bridge, in Blackburn, was opened and named the Wainwright Bridge in his honour.

John Burland, a founding member of the Wainwright Society, wrote and devised a dramatic presentation of his life and works which was presented at the Wildman Theatre at Ilkley Playhouse as part of the Ilkley Literature Festival on 15 October 2009. During 2010 and 2011 a further 17 presentations were made.

In 2013, a memorial toposcope was unveiled on the hills near his home town of Blackburn.

A pedestrian area of Kendal, including the office of Wainwright's first publisher the Westmorland Gazette, is named Wainwright's Yard and features a display of pages from his books.

== Bibliography ==
=== Books written or illustrated by Wainwright ===
==== Small-format walking guidebooks ====
- A Pictorial Guide to the Lakeland Fells:
  - Book One: The Eastern Fells (1955)
  - Book Two: The Far Eastern Fells (1957)
  - Book Three: The Central Fells (1958)
  - Book Four: The Southern Fells (1960)
  - Book Five: The Northern Fells (1962)
  - Book Six: The North Western Fells (1964)
  - Book Seven: The Western Fells (1966)
- Pennine Way Companion (1968)
- Walks in Limestone Country (1970)
- Walks on the Howgill Fells (1972)
- A Coast to Coast Walk (1973)
- The Outlying Fells of Lakeland (1974)
- Walks from Ratty (1978)
- Old Roads of Eastern Lakeland (1985)

==== Large-format guidebooks, illustrated with colour photographs ====
- Fellwalking with Wainwright, photographs by Derry Brabbs (1984)
- Wainwright on the Pennine Way, photographs by Derry Brabbs (1985)
- Wainwright's Coast to Coast Walk, photographs by Derry Brabbs (1987)
- Wainwright in Scotland, photographs by Derry Brabbs (1988)
- Wainwright on the Lakeland Mountain Passes, photographs by Derry Brabbs (1989)
- Wainwright in the Limestone Dales, photographs by Ed Gelgard (1991)
- Wainwright's Favourite Lakeland Mountains, photographs by Derry Brabbs (1991, posthumously)
- Wainwright in the Valleys of Lakeland, photographs by Derry Brabbs (1992, posthumously)

==== Books of drawings ====
- Lakeland Sketchbooks:
  - A Lakeland Sketchbook (1969)
  - A Second Lakeland Sketchbook (1970)
  - A Third Lakeland Sketchbook (1971)
  - A Fourth Lakeland Sketchbook (1972)
  - A Fifth Lakeland Sketchbook (1973)
- Scottish Mountain Drawings:
  - Volume One: The Northern Highlands (1974)
  - Volume Two: The North-Western Highlands (1976)
  - Volume Three: The Western Highlands (1976)
  - Volume Four: The Central Highlands (1977)
  - Volume Five: The Eastern Highlands (1978)
  - Volume Six: The Islands (1979)
- A Dales Sketchbook (1976)
- Kendal in the 19th Century (1977)
- A Second Dales Sketchbook (1978)
- A Furness Sketchbook (1978)
- A Second Furness Sketchbook (1979)
- Three Westmorland Rivers (1979)
- A Lune Sketchbook (1980)
- A Ribble Sketchbook (1980)
- An Eden Sketchbook (1980)
- Lakeland Mountain Drawings:
  - Volume One (1980)
  - Volume Two (1981)
  - Volume Three (1982)
  - Volume Four (1983)
  - Volume Five (1984)
- A Bowland Sketchbook (1981)
- Welsh Mountain Drawings (1981)
- A Wyre Sketchbook (1982)
- A North Wales Sketchbook (1982)
- A South Wales Sketchbook (1983)
- A Peak District Sketchbook (1984)

==== Books of photographs ====
- Fellwalking with a Camera (1988)

==== Local history books ====
- Westmorland Heritage (1975)

==== Autobiographical works ====
- Fellwanderer: The Story Behind the Guidebooks (1966)
- A Pennine Journey: The Story of a Long Walk in 1938 (1986)
- Ex-Fellwanderer (1987)

==== Maps ====
- Map of Westmorland (1974)
- Antiquarian Map of Cumbria (1980)

=== Original illustrations, maps and forewords in other books ===
- Inside the Real Lakeland by A. Harry Griffin (1961)
- In Mountain Lakeland by A. Harry Griffin (1963)
- Annual Accounts of Southern Lakes and Lune Water Board (1963–1973)
- Scratch and Co by Molly Lefebure (1968)
- The Hunting of Wilberforce Pike by Molly Lefebure (1970)
- Across Northern Hills by Geoffrey Berry (1975)
- The Plague Dogs by Richard Adams (1977)
- Guide to the View from Scafell Pike by Chris Jesty (1978)
- My Favourite Stories of Lakeland by Melvyn Bragg (1981)
- Climbing at Wasdale Before the First World War by George S Sansom (1982)
- A Naturalist’s Guide to Lakeland Waterfalls Throughout the Year by Mary Welsh (1985)
- Lakeland 50 Years Ago by Kenneth Shepherd (1989)

=== Books and maps comprising previously published material ===
- Wainwright in Lakeland (1983)
- Memoirs of a Fellwanderer (1993)
- Wainwright’s Lakeland, photographs by Derry Brabbs (1994)
- Wainwright Maps of the Lakeland Fells:
  - Map One: The Eastern Fells (1997)
  - Map Two: The Far Eastern Fells (1997)
  - Map Three: The Central Fells (1999)
  - Map Four: The Southern Fells (1996)
  - Map Five: The Northern Fells (1999)
  - Map Six: The North Western Fells (1996)
  - Map Seven: The Western Fells (1998)
- Seven Favourite Fellwalks compiled by Michael Joseph Ltd (1996)
- The Best of Wainwright compiled by Hunter Davis (2004)
- Wainwright’s TV Walks introduced by Eric Robson (2007)
- Twelve Favourite Mountains compiled by Frances Lincoln Ltd (2007)
- Wainwright: The Podcasts compiled by Frances Lincoln Ltd (2008)
- Wainwright Family Walks: Vol. 1: The Southern Fells edited by Tom Holman (2012)
- Family Walks in the Lake District: Vol. 2: The Northern Fells edited by Tom Holman (2013)

=== Books based on Wainwright’s life and work ===
- Combined Indexes to A Wainwright’s Pictorial Guides to the Lakeland Fells compiled by John M Turner (1982)
- Sue Lawley’s Desert Island Discussions by Sue Lawley (1990)
- A Companion to Wainwright’s Pictorial Guides to the Lakeland Fells compiled by Joan Newsome (1992)
- Wainwright's Tour in the Lake District (1993), photographs by Ed Gelgard
- The Official Wainwright Gazetteer compiled by Peter Linney (1993)
- The Walkers Log Book: Volume One compiled by Michael Joseph Ltd (1993)
- The Walkers Log Book: Volume Two compiled by Michael Joseph Ltd (1993)
- For Those Who Love the Hills compiled by William F Dyer (1994)
- Wainwright – The Biography by Hunter Davis (1995)
- The Wainwright Memorial Walk compiled by Michael Joseph Ltd (1998)
- After Wainwright by Eric Robson (2003)
- Wainwright: The Man Who Loved the Lakes by Martin Wainwright (2007)
- In the Footprints of Wainwright by Derry Brabbs (2007)
- Wainwright: His Life from Milltown to Mountain by WR Mitchell (2009)
- Wainwright’s Lost Tour by Ed Geldard (2010)
- A Pennine Journey: From Settle to Hadrian's Wall in Wainwright's Footsteps edited by David Pitt (2010)
- The Wainwright Letters edited by Hunter Davis (2011)
- Behind the Scenes with Wainwright: A Publisher's Perspective of a Reluctant Celebrity by Andrew Nichol (2012)
- The Wainwright Companion by Clive Hutchby, photographs by Sean McMahon (2012)
- Wainwright Revealed by Richard Else (2017)
- Wainwright Memories by Chris Butterfield (2023)

In addition to the above works, many other books contain previously published illustrations by Wainwright, or whose subject matter has been inspired by his life and works.

== See also ==
- Harry Griffin – Lakeland diarist and friend of Wainwright's, who nonetheless disapproved of the damage to the fells that the popular guidebooks could cause.
- W. A. Poucher – whose mountain guidebook style and intensive use of photographs were in contrast to Wainwright's.
- Wainwright Prize – literary prize celebrating the legacy of Wainwright.
