= George and Ashley Abraham =

British rock climbers, authors, and photographers

George and Ashley Abraham (George Dixon Abraham, FRPS, 7 October 1871 – 4 March 1965; Ashley Perry Abraham, 20 February 1876 – 9 October 1951), sometimes referred to as "The Keswick Brothers", were rock climbers, authors and photographers who lived in Keswick, Cumberland in the English Lake District. They made a photographic record of the exploits of many of the climbing pioneers, especially Owen Glynne Jones, with whom they formed a close climbing partnership from 1896 until his death in 1899. Most of their work was done between 1890 and 1920 and forms a valuable record of the evolution of early rock climbing in the region.

== Early life ==
They were the two eldest of four sons of George Perry Abraham (1844–1923), a photographer, postcard publisher, and mountaineer, and his wife Mary Dixon. Their brother Sidney was a bank manager in Keswick, and brother John Abraham became acting Governor of Tanganyika.

George married Winifred Ellen Davies; their daughter was the diarist Enid J. Wilson. Winifred "ghosted George Abraham's numerous books on the basis of her husband's rough notes".

== Rock climbing ==
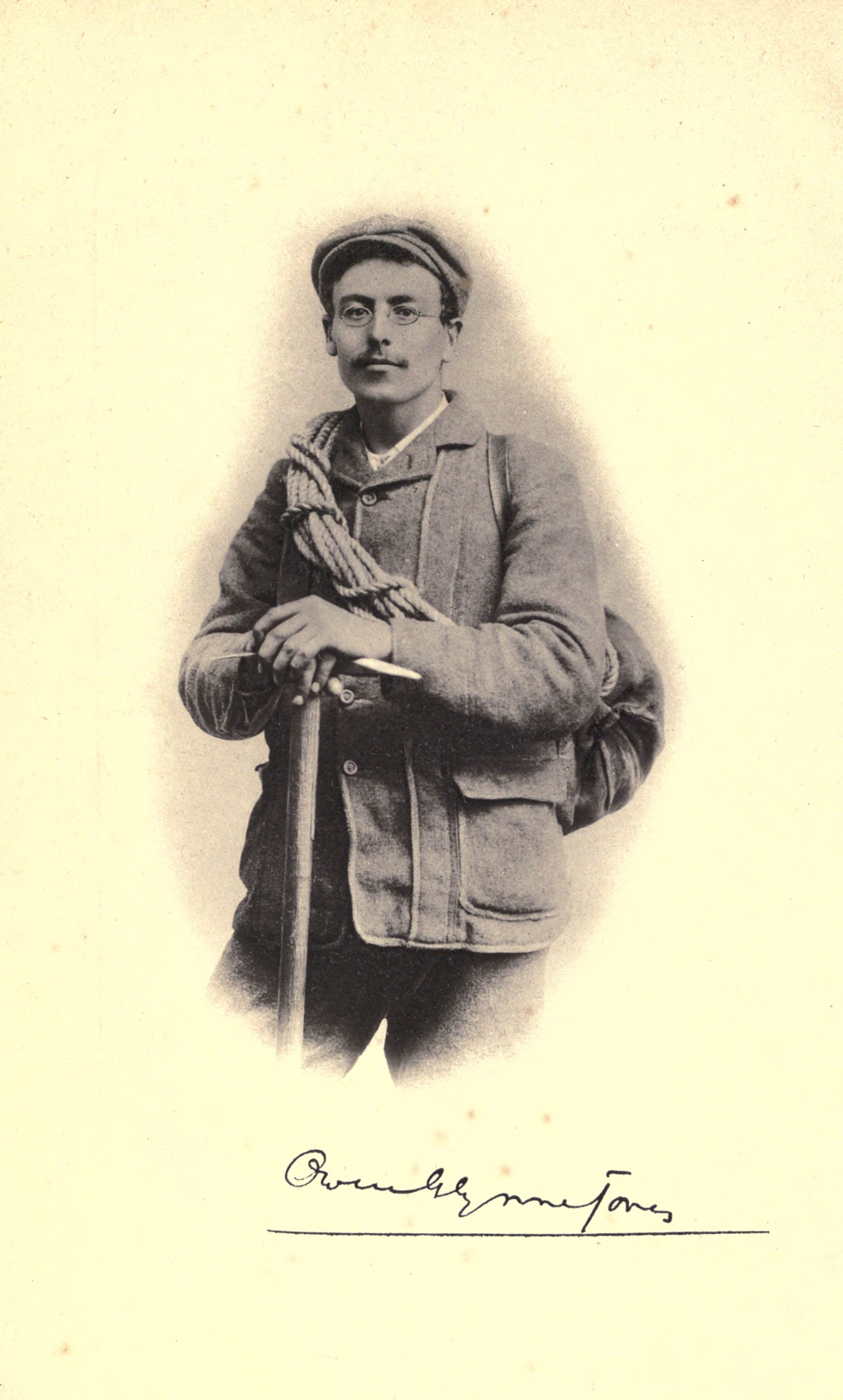
Portrait and signature of Owen Glynne Jones from his book Rock-climbing in the English Lake District

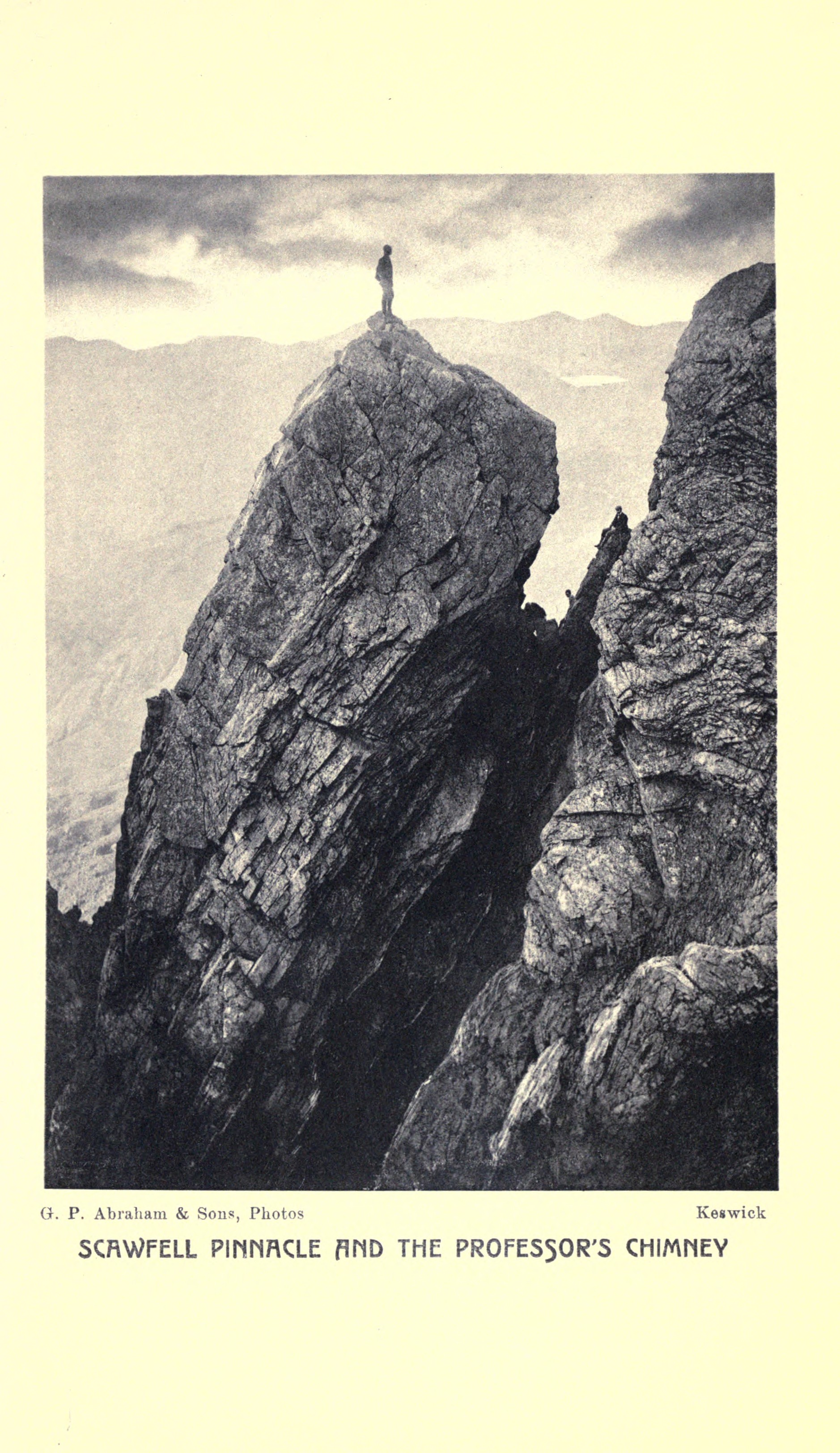
Photograph from Jones's book, Rock-climbing in the English Lake District

One of their many first ascents in the Lakes was the 74 m "Keswick Brothers' Climb" on Scafell crag on 12 July 1897, now considered "Very Difficult" in the British grading system. Another memorable first ascent was of "Crowberry Ridge Direct" (graded "Severe") on the Scottish Munro Buachaille Etive Mor in 1900.

After their co-operation with Jones in his very successful Rock Climbing in the English Lake District (1897), they produced companion volumes, Rock Climbing in North Wales (George, in 1906) and Rock Climbing in Skye (Ashley, in 1907). These attempted to emulate Jones' exuberant style, and were of course illustrated with their own photographs.

Throughout their career the brothers' camera of choice was the Underwood Instanto, which recorded images on 8.5 x 6.5 inch photographic plates. Many of their climbing photographs, (including the classic portrait of Owen Glynne Jones), were reproduced in Alan Hankinson's Camera on the Crags. A large selection is also in the possession of the FRCC (The Fell and Rock Climbing Club of the English Lake District), of which the brothers were founding members and Ashley its first president. The FRCC was founded at the Wasdale Head Inn, which displays a large number of Abraham photographs, including in its Abrahams' Restaurant. Two current books of Abraham photographs, Capturing the Mountains and From Pillar Rock to the Matterhorn (both compiled and edited by Sue Steinberg, granddaughter of Ashley Abraham) are available there and elsewhere.

The Abrahams' photographic shop in Keswick, built in 1887, was taken over in due course by local mountaineer George Fisher; the modern shop still contains many memorabilia, including photographs, from the Abrahams' era.

== Publications ==
=== Mountaineering ===
==== Books ====
- Jones, Owen Glynne (1897). Rock-climbing in the English Lake District. London: Longmans, Green & Co.
- Abraham, George & Abraham, Ashley (1906). Rock-climbing in North Wales. Keswick: G.P. Abraham.
- Abraham, George D. (1907). The Complete Mountaineer. London: Methuen.
- Abraham, Ashley P. (1908). Rock-climbing in Skye. London: Longmans.
- Abraham, George D. (1909). British Mountain Climbs. London: Mills & Boon.
- Abraham, George D. (1910). Mountain Adventures at Home and Abroad. London: Methuen.
- Abraham, George D. (1911). Swiss Mountain Climbs. London: Mills & Boon.
- Abraham, George D. (1916). On Alpine Heights And British Crags. London: Methuen.
- Abraham, George D. (1923). First Steps to Climbing. London: Mills & Boon.
- Abraham, George D. (1933). Modern Mountaineering. London: Methuen.
- Abraham, George D. (1935). Guide To Keswick & The Vale of Derwentwater. Keswick: G.P. Abraham.
- Abraham, George D. (1946). Derwentwater Holiday Book. Keswick: G.P. Abraham.

==== Articles ====
- Abraham, George & Abraham, Ashley P. (1899). "Rock Climbing in Great Britain". The Wide World Magazine. Vol. 2, no. 6 (No. 12). London: George Newnes. pp. 660–671.
- Abraham, George D. (1900). "Pioneers of the Year on the Matterhorn". The Wide World Magazine. Vol. 6, no. 1 (No. 31). London: George Newnes. pp. 48–52.
- Abraham, Ashley P. (1901). "Our Alps at Home: Winter Mountaineering in England". The Harmsworth Magazine. Vol. 6, no. 3 (No. 33). London: The Amalgamated Press Ltd. pp. 233–239.
- Abraham, George D. (1902). "The Most Difficult Climbs in Britain". The Pall Mall Magazine. Vol. 27, no. 3 (No. 95). London: Routledge. pp. 433–442.
- Abraham, Ashley P. (1902). "With a Camera Up Mont Blanc". Cassell's Magazine. Vol. 34, no. 4. London: Cassell. pp. 339–346.
- Abraham, Ashley P. (1903). Douglas, William (ed.). "Glencoe" (PDF). The Scottish Mountaineering Club Journal. Vol. 7, no. 2 (No. 38). Edinburgh: The Scottish Mountaineering Club. pp. 110–111.
- Abraham, Ashley P. (1903). "Mountaineering in Switzerland without Guides". McClure's Magazine. Vol. 21, no. 3. New York: S.S. McClure & Co. pp. 227–236.
- Abraham, George D. (1903). "A New Alpine Playground: 'Twixt the Matterhorn and Mont Blanc Without Guides". The Pall Mall Magazine. Vol. 30, no. 1 (No. 121). London: Routledge. pp. 18–25.
- Abraham, Ashley P. (1905). "Climbing as a Holiday Pastime". Pearson's Magazine. Vol. 19, no. 5 (No. 113). London: C.A. Pearson. pp. 483–484.
- Abraham, Ashley P. (1905). "Two Adventurous Climbs in the Oberland". Pearson's Magazine. Vol. 19, no. 5 (No. 113). London: C.A. Pearson. pp. 485–495.
- Abraham, George D. (1905). "Gambling with Nature". Gunter's Magazine. Vol. 1, no. 6. New York: The Home Publishing Company. pp. 740–750.
- Abraham, George D. (1905). "Midst Snow and Ice in the High Alps: Climbing the Great Peaks of the Bernese Oberland". The Pall Mall Magazine. Vol. 36, no. 3 (No. 149). London: Routledge. pp. 289–300.
- Abraham, George D. (1906). "The Highest Climbs in the World: Can Everest Be Conquered?". The Pall Mall Magazine. Vol. 38, no. 1 (No. 159). London: Routledge. pp. 21–28.
- Abraham, George D. (1908). "The Most Difficult Climbs in the Alps: Tales of Adventure Among the Chamonix Aiguilles". The Pall Mall Magazine. Vol. 42, no. 3 (No. 185). London: Routledge. pp. 296–305.
- Abraham, George D. (1908). "Up the Schreckenhorn in a Storm". The Strand Magazine. Vol. 36, no. 4 (No. 214). London: George Newnes. pp. 442–449.
- Abraham, George D. (1910). "The Dangers of the Alps: Their Causes, and How to Avoid Them". The Pall Mall Magazine. Vol. 46, no. 2 (No. 208). London: Routledge. pp. 220–228.
- Abraham, George D. (1911). "Adventures Amongst the Dolomites". The Pall Mall Magazine. Vol. 48, no. 3 (No. 221). London: Routledge. pp. 336–347.
- Abraham, George D. (1911). "The Most Dangerous Work in the World". The Wide World Magazine. Vol. 27, no. 6 (No. 162). London: George Newnes. pp. 530–539.
- Abraham, George D. (1912). "How to Climb Safely in the Alps". The Pall Mall Magazine. Vol. 50, no. 1 (No. 231). London: Routledge. pp. 2–15.
- Abraham, George D. (1912). "Our Adventures in the Black Coolin". The Wide World Magazine. Vol. 29, no. 1 (No. 169). London: George Newnes. pp. 26–34.
- Abraham, Ashley P. (1912). "With Rope and Camera in the Tyrolese Dolomites". The Wide World Magazine. Vol. 29, no. 2 (No. 170). London: George Newnes. pp. 144–156.
- Abraham, George D. (1912). "A Night Adventure on the Fünffingerspitze: A Pioneer-of-the-Year Climb Up the Most Difficult of the Dolomites". The Strand Magazine. Vol. 44, no. 3 (No. 261). London: George Newnes. pp. 256–263.
- Abraham, George D. (1912). "The Most Difficult Climbs in Britain". The Wide World Magazine. Vol. 29, no. 6 (No. 174). London: George Newnes. pp. 594–600.
- Abraham, George D. (1913). "Tempest-Bound on The Mönch: An Adventurous Out-of-Season Climb". The Strand Magazine. Vol. 45, no. 3 (No. 267). London: George Newnes. pp. 327–335.
- Abraham, George D. (1913). "Twixt the Matterhorn and Mont Blanc: Some Guideless Climbing Adventures". The Wide World Magazine. Vol. 31, no. 4 (No. 184). London: George Newnes. pp. 333–341.
- Abraham, Ashley P. (1913). "Two Thrilling British Climbs". The Wide World Magazine. Vol. 31, no. 5 (No. 185). London: George Newnes. pp. 458–465.
- Abraham, George D. (1914). "Some New British Climbs". The Wide World Magazine. Vol. 33, no. 5 (No. 197). London: George Newnes.
- Abraham, George D. (1916). "Winter-Sport Mountaineering: How to Avoid Its Dangers". The Wide World Magazine. Vol. 36, no. 6 (No. 216). London: George Newnes.
- Abraham, George D. (14 August 1920). "Mountaineering in the Matterhorn of Skye". The Graphic. Vol. 102, no. 2646. London: Edward Joseph Mansfield. p. 246–248.
- Abraham, George D. (13 September 1924). "A Mountain Smuggler". The Graphic. Vol. 110, no. 2859. London: Edward Joseph Mansfield. p. 434.
- Abraham, George D. (29 November 1924). "A November Day on Scawfell [sic]". The Graphic. Vol. 110, no. 2870. London: Edward Joseph Mansfield. p. 910.

=== Tourism ===
==== Books ====
- Abraham, Ashley P. (1912). Beautiful Lakeland. Keswick: G.P. Abraham.
- Abraham, Ashley P. (1913). Some Portraits of the Lake Poets and Their Homes. Keswick: G.P. Abraham.
- Abraham, George D. (1913). Motor Ways in Lakeland. London: Methuen.
- Abraham, Ashley P. (1914). Beautiful North Wales. Keswick: G.P. Abraham.
- Abraham, Ashley P. The English Lakeland. Keswick: G.P. Abraham. (Undated)

=== Miscellaneous ===
==== Articles ====
- Abraham, Ashley P. (1900). "A Cure for Consumption: Dr. Otto Walther and His Work". The Windsor Magazine. Vol. 11, no. 3 (No. 62). London: Ward, Lock & Co. pp. 365–371. (Note: The brothers were excused active service during the First World War on medical grounds, in Ashley's case because he had previously suffered from Tuberculosis.)
- Abraham, George D. (17 May 1924). "Two Miles Inside a Mountain". The Graphic. Vol. 109, no. 2842. London: Edward Joseph Mansfield. p. 754. (Note: An account of a trip down the Greenside Lead Mine (Cumbria) made by the author.)

== See also ==
- M. J. B. Baddeley - a leading writer of a Lakes guidebook in the older, text-based style.
- W. A. Poucher - who further developed the Abrahams' style of highly-illustrated guides.
