= Walking in the United Kingdom =

Aspect of outdoor activities in the UK

Walking is one of the most popular outdoor recreational activities in the United Kingdom, and within England and Wales there is a comprehensive network of rights of way that permits access to the countryside. Furthermore, access to much uncultivated and unenclosed land has opened up since the enactment of the Countryside and Rights of Way Act 2000. In Scotland the ancient tradition of universal access to land was formally codified under the Land Reform (Scotland) Act 2003. In Northern Ireland, however, there are few rights of way, or other access to land.

Walking is used in the United Kingdom to describe a range of activity, from a walk in the park to trekking in the Alps. The word "hiking" is used in the UK, but less often than walking; the word rambling (akin to roam) is also used, and the main organisation that supports walking is called The Ramblers. Walking in mountainous areas in Britain is called hillwalking, or in Northern England, including the Lake District and Yorkshire Dales, fellwalking, from the dialect word fell for high, uncultivated land. Mountain walking can sometimes involve scrambling.

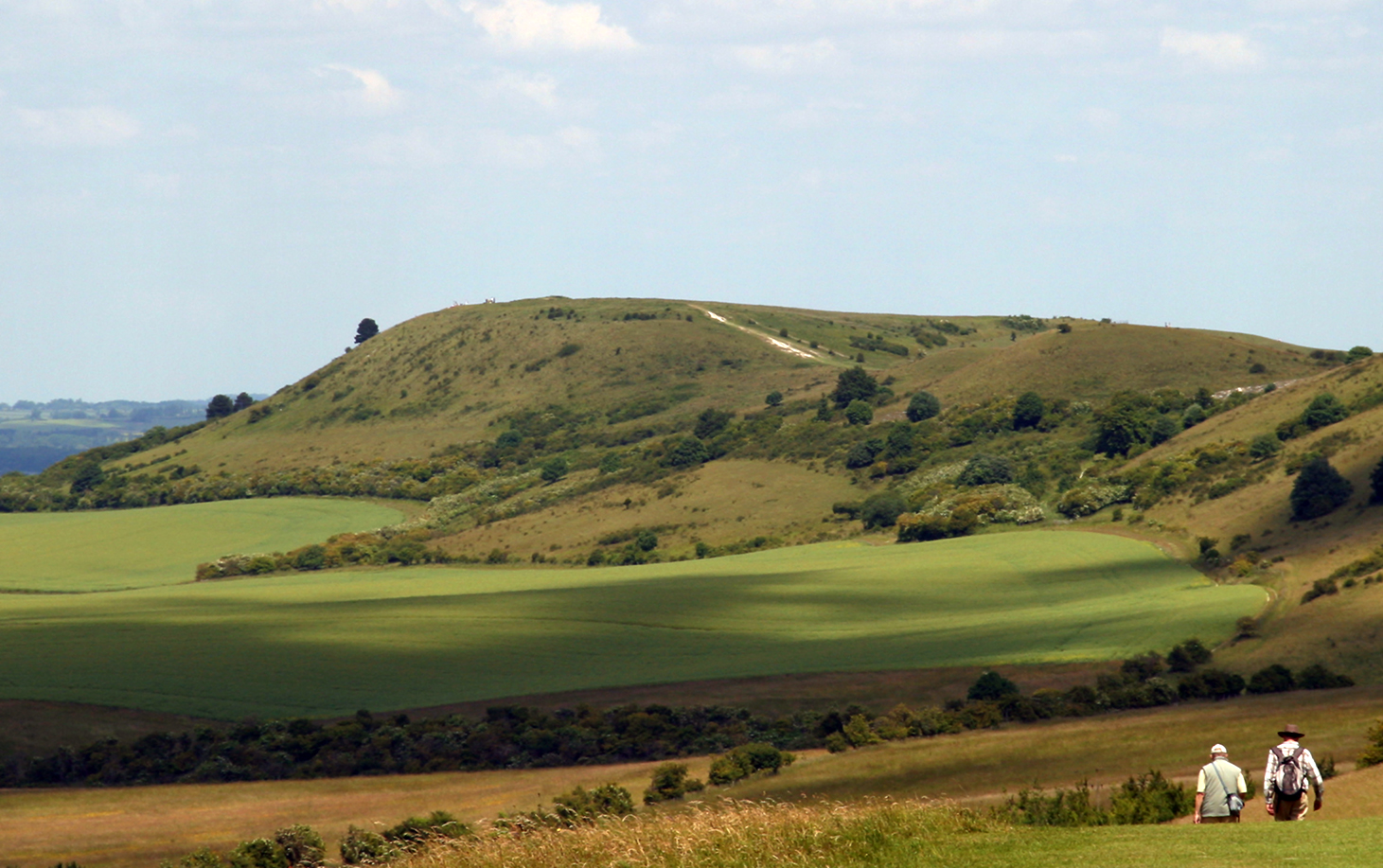
Ivinghoe Beacon in Buckinghamshire, (the eastern trailhead) seen looking north from the Ridgeway

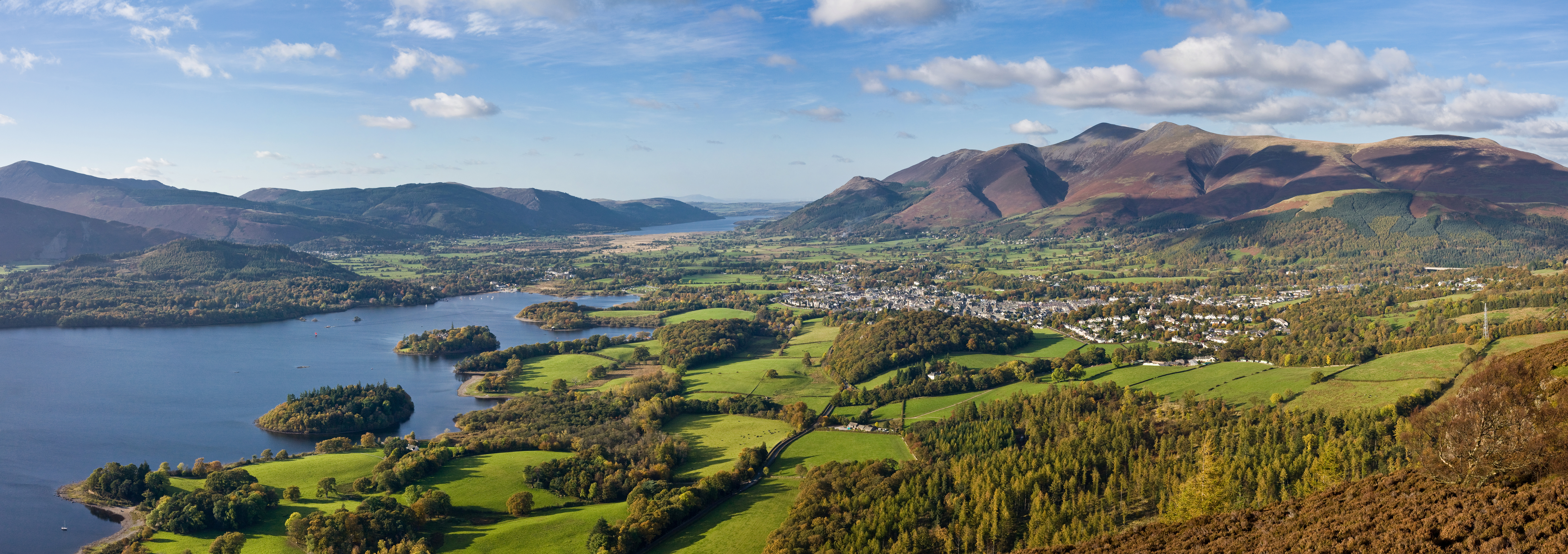
Skiddaw mountain, the town of Keswick, Cumbria and Derwent Water seen from Walla Crag, Lake District, England

== History ==
The idea of undertaking a walk through the countryside for pleasure developed in the 18th century, and arose because of changing attitudes to nature and the natural environment associated with the Romantic movement. In earlier times walking generally indicated poverty and was also associated with vagrancy.

Thomas West, an English priest, popularised the idea of walking for pleasure in his guide to the Lake District of 1778. In the introduction he wrote that he aimed

to encourage the taste of visiting the lakes by furnishing the traveller with a Guide; and for that purpose, the writer has here collected and laid before him, all the select stations and points of view, noticed by those authors who have last made the tour of the lakes, verified by his own repeated observations.

To this end he included various "stations" or viewpoints around the lakes, from which tourists would be encouraged to appreciate the views for their aesthetic qualities and natural beauty. West's guide was a major success upon its publication.

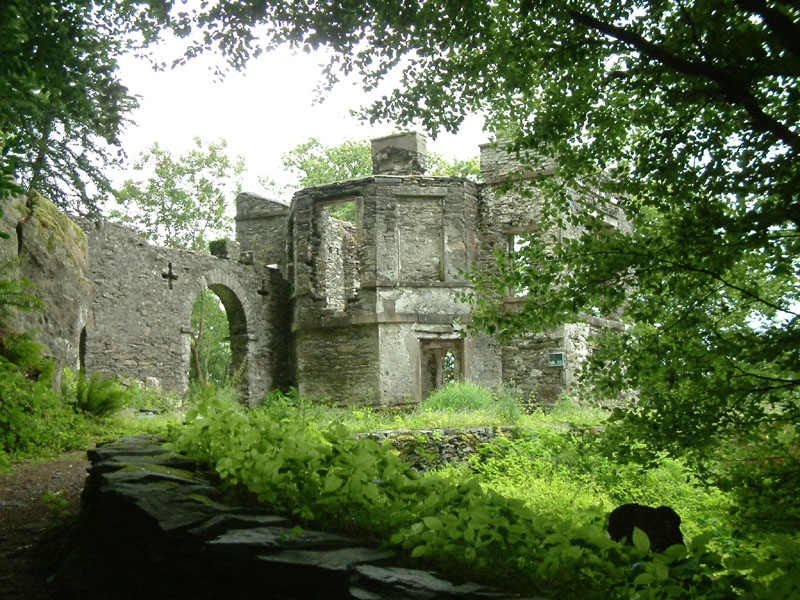
Claife Station, built at one of Thomas West's "viewing stations", to allow visiting tourists and artists to better appreciate the picturesque Lake District

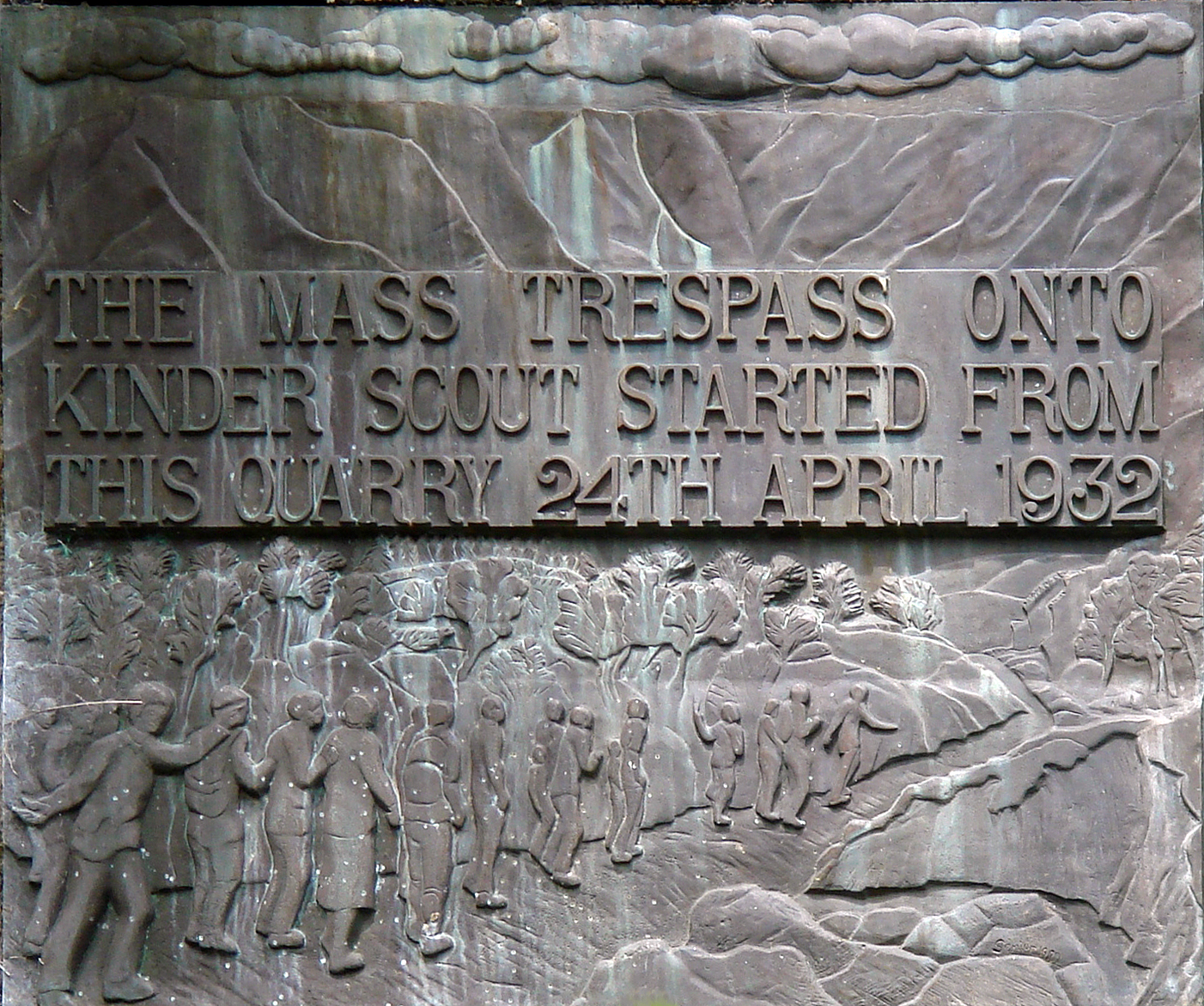
Commemorative plaque of the Mass trespass of Kinder Scout in 1932, an event that led to great expansion of the public right of access to the British countryside

Another famous early exponent of walking for pleasure was the English poet William Wordsworth. In 1790 he embarked on an extended tour of France, Switzerland and Germany, a journey he subsequently recorded in his lengthy autobiographical poem The Prelude (1850). His famous poem Tintern Abbey was inspired by a visit to the Wye Valley made during a walking tour of Wales in 1798 with his sister Dorothy Wordsworth.

Wordsworth's friend the English poet Samuel Taylor Coleridge was another keen walker and in the autumn of 1799, he and Wordsworth undertook a three-week tour of the Lake District. John Keats, who belonged to the next generation of Romantic poets began, in June 1818, a walking tour of Scotland, Ireland and the Lake District with his friend Charles Armitage Brown.

More and more people undertook walking tours through the 19th century, of which the most famous is probably Robert Louis Stevenson's journey through the Cévennes in France with a donkey, recorded in his Travels with a Donkey (1879). Stevenson also published in 1876 his famous essay "Walking Tours". The subgenre of travel writing produced many classics in the subsequent 20th century. An early American example of a book that describes an extended walking tour is the naturalist John Muir's A Thousand Mile Walk to the Gulf (1916), a posthumous published account of a long botanising walk, undertaken in 1867.

Due to industrialisation in England, people began to migrate to the cities, where living standards were often cramped and unsanitary. They would escape the confines of the city by rambling about in the countryside. However, the land in England, particularly around the urban areas of Manchester and Sheffield, was privately owned and trespass was illegal. Rambling clubs soon sprang up in Northern England and began politically campaigning for the legal 'right to roam'. One of the first such clubs was the 'Sunday Tramps', founded by Sir Frederick Pollock, George Croom Robertson and Leslie Stephen in 1879. The first national grouping, the Federation of Rambling Clubs, was formed in London in 1905 and was heavily patronised by the peerage.

=== Political activism and walking in inter-war Britain ===
In the 1930s walking reached new levels of popularity as a pastime: on any weekend some ten thousand ramblers could be expected on the moors of the Peak District, while in the country at large there were over half a million ramblers. A convergence of economic factors played their part in this boom in numbers: the 1920s saw a steady reduction in the working hours of the British worker as well as a rise in real wages and a decreasing cost of travel. In the early 1930s a rise in unemployment led to more leisure time, leading to a surge in walking known as a "hiking craze".

There was also a high level of media coverage which, according to Ann Holt, was comparable to modern media hype. Frank Trentmann has suggested that the surge in walkers made it "the numerically strongest part of the new romanticism [sic] in interwar Britain".

With these increasing numbers came increasingly strong demands for walkers rights. Access to Mountains bills, that would have legislated the public's right to roam across some private land, were periodically presented to Parliament from 1884 to 1932 without success. Mass rallies and trespasses were held in support of this cause, including an annual access to mountains demonstration at Winnats Pass and, most famously, a mass trespass on Kinder Scout in Derbyshire. However, the Mountain Access Bill that was passed in 1939 was opposed by many walkers, including the organisation The Ramblers, who felt that it did not sufficiently protect their rights, and it was eventually repealed.

Following the end of the Second World War the effort to improve access led to the National Parks and Access to the Countryside Act 1949, and in 1951 to the creation of the first national park in Britain, the Peak District National Park. The establishment of this and similar national parks helped to improve access for all outdoors enthusiasts. The Countryside and Rights of Way Act 2000 considerably extended the right to roam in England and Wales.

=== Walking tour ===
A walking tour is an extended walk in the countryside, undertaken by an individual or group and lasting several days. Walking tours have their origin in the Romantic movement of the late-18th and early-19th centuries. It has some similarities with backpacking, trekking and also tramping in New Zealand, though it need not take place in remote places. In the late-20th century, with the proliferation of official and unofficial long-distance walking routes, some walkers now are more likely to follow a designated long-distance route than to plan their own route. Walking tours are also organised by commercial companies, and can have a professional guide, or are self-guided; in these commercially organised tours, luggage is often transported between accommodation stops.

== Access to the countryside ==
=== England and Wales ===
==== Rights of way ====
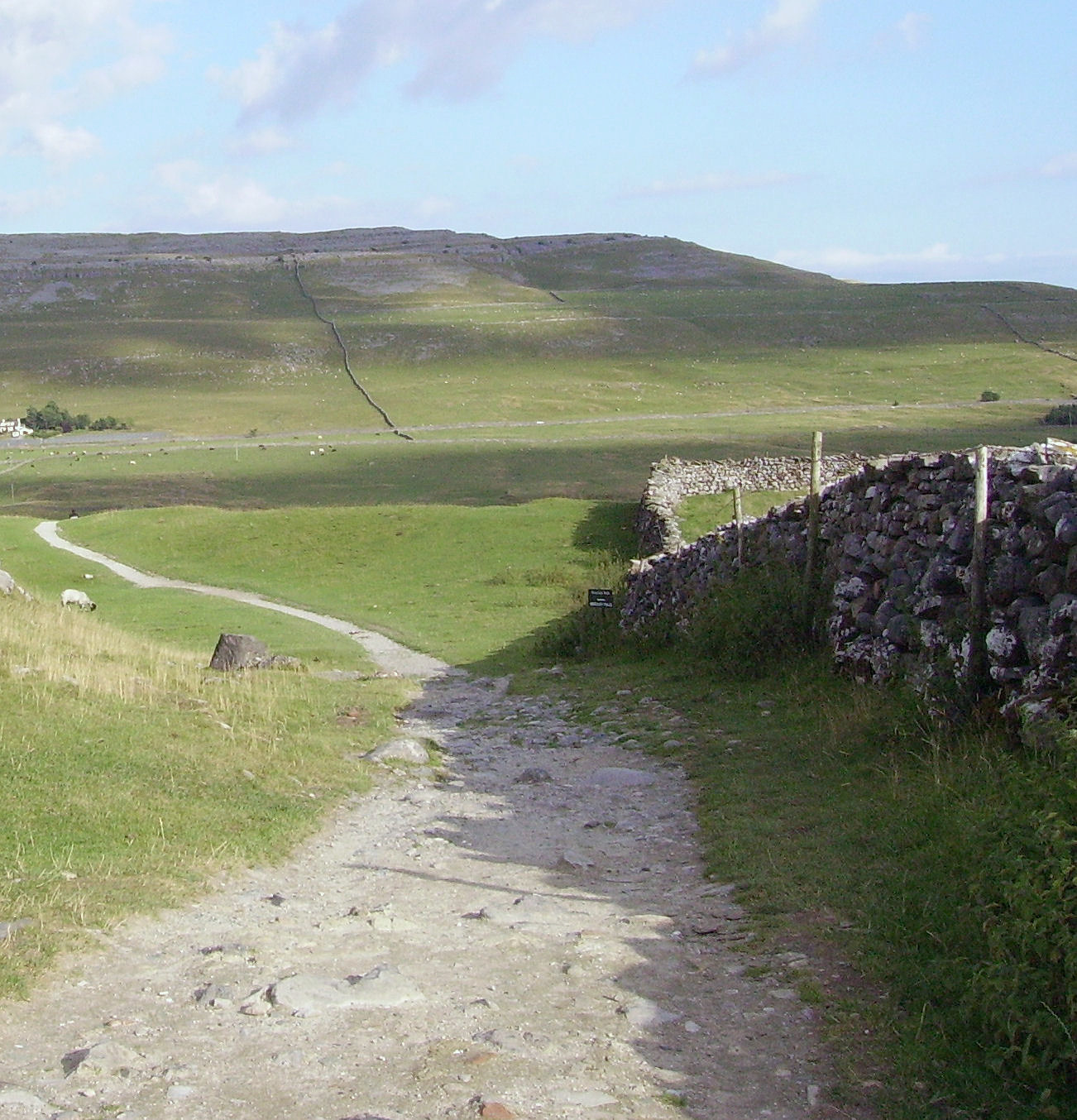
Limestone hills and dry-stone walls in the west of the Yorkshire Dales. This part of the national park is popular with walkers due to the presence of the Yorkshire Three Peaks.

In England and Wales the public have a legally protected right to "pass and repass" (i.e. walk) on footpaths, bridleways and other routes which have the status of a public right of way. Footpaths typically pass over private land, but if they are public rights of way they are public highways with the same protection in law as other highways, such as trunk roads. Public rights of way originated in common law, but are now regulated by the Countryside and Rights of Way Act 2000. These rights have occasionally resulted in conflicts between walkers, landowners and local authorities. The rights and obligations of farmers who cultivate crops in fields crossed by public footpaths are now specified in the law. Walkers can also use permissive paths, where the public do not have a legal right to walk, but where the landowner has granted them permission to do so.

==== Rights of way in London ====
Definitive maps of public rights of way have been compiled for all of England and Wales as a result of Countryside and Rights of Way Act 2000, except the 12 Inner London boroughs which, along with the City of London, were not covered by the Act.

To protect the existing rights of way in London the Ramblers launched their "Putting London on the Map" in 2010 with the aim of getting "the same legal protection for paths in the capital as already exists for footpaths elsewhere in England and Wales. Currently, legislation allows the Inner London boroughs to choose to produce definitive maps if they wish, but none do so".

==== Right to roam ====
Walkers long campaigned for the right to roam, or access privately owned uncultivated land. In 1932 the mass trespass of Kinder Scout had a far-reaching impact. The National Parks and Access to the Countryside Act 1949 created the concept of designated Open Country, where access agreements were negotiated with landowners. The Countryside and Rights of Way Act 2000 gave walkers a conditional right to access most areas of uncultivated land.

=== Scotland ===
==== Right to roam ====
In Scotland there is a traditional presumption of universal access to land. This was formally codified into Scots law under the Land Reform (Scotland) Act 2003, which grants everyone the right to be on most land and inland water for recreation, education, and going from place to place, providing they act responsibly. The basis of access rights in Scotland is one of shared responsibilities, in that those exercising such rights have to act responsibly, whilst landowners and managers have a reciprocal responsibility to respect the interests of those who exercise their rights. The Scottish Outdoor Access Code provides detailed guidance on these responsibilities.

Responsible access can be enjoyed over the majority of land in Scotland, including all uncultivated land such as hills, mountains, moorland, woods and forests. Access rights also apply to fields in which crops have not been sown or in which there are farm animals grazing; where crops are growing or have been sown access rights are restricted to the margins of those fields. Access rights do not apply to land on which there is a building, plant or machinery. Where that building is a house or other dwelling (e.g. a static caravan) the land surrounding it is also excluded in order to provide reasonable measures of privacy. The issue of how much land surrounding a building is required to provide "reasonable measures of privacy" has been the main issue on which the courts have been asked to intervene. In Gloag v. Perth and Kinross Council the sheriff allowed about 5.7 hectares (14 acres) surrounding Kinfauns Castle, a property belonging to Ann Gloag, to be excluded from access rights. In Snowie v Stirling Council and the Ramblers' Association the courts allowed about 5.3 hectares (13 acres) to be excluded, but refused permission for a wider area to be excluded and required the landowner to keep the driveway unlocked to allow access.

==== Rights of way ====
In addition to the general right of access the public also have the right to use any defined route over which the public has been able to pass unhindered for at least 20 years. However, local authorities are not required to maintain and signpost public rights of way as they are in England and Wales.

=== Northern Ireland ===
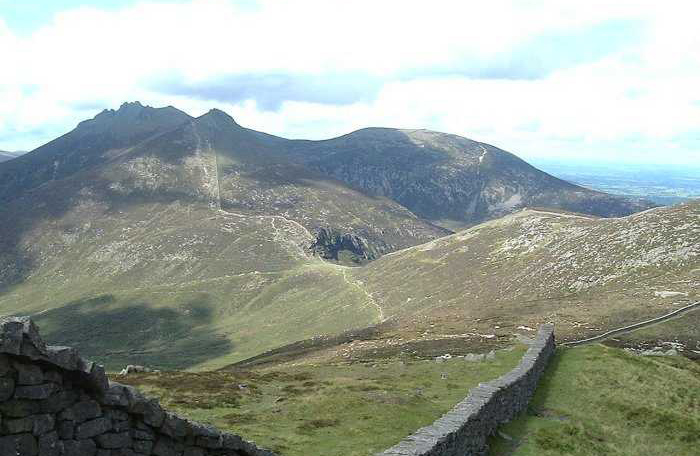
The Mourne Wall, looking towards Hare's Gap in the Mourne Mountains, Northern Ireland

Northern Ireland has very few public rights of way and access to land in Northern Ireland is more restricted than other parts of the UK, so that in many areas walkers can only enjoy the countryside because of the goodwill and tolerance of landowners. Permission has been obtained from all landowners across whose land the Waymarked Ways and Ulster Way traverse. Much of Northern Ireland's public land is accessible, e.g. Water Service and Forest Service land, as is land owned and managed by organisations such as the National Trust and the Woodland Trust.

Northern Ireland shares the same legal system as England, including concepts about the ownership of land and public rights of way, but it has its own court structure, system of precedents and specific access legislation.

=== Long-distance footpaths ===
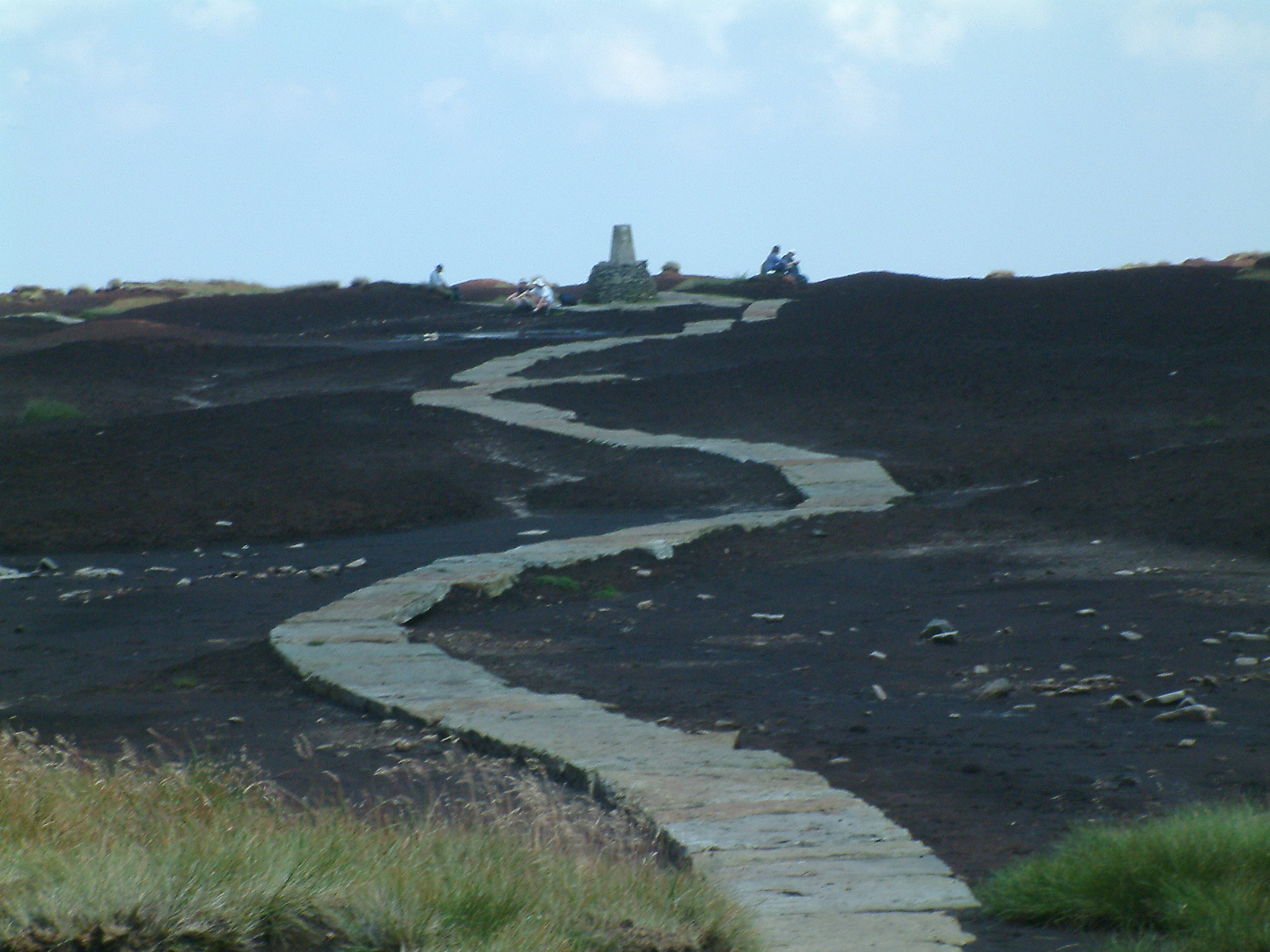
The paved surface of the Pennine Way on Black Hill, on the border of Derbyshire and West Yorkshire, England

Long-distance paths are created by linking public footpaths, other rights of way, and sometimes permissive paths, to form a continuous walking route. They are usually waymarked and guidebooks are available for most long-distance paths. Paths are generally well signposted, although a map is also needed, and a compass may sometimes be needed on high moorland.

There are usually places to camp on an extended trip, but accommodation of various kinds is available on many routes. However, occasionally paths are distant from settlements, so that camping is necessary. Water is not available on high downland paths, like the Ridgeway, though taps have been provided at some spots.

Fifteen paths in England and Wales have the status of National Trails, which attract government financial support. Twenty-nine paths in Scotland have the similar status of Scotland's Great Trails. The first long-distance path was the Pennine Way, which was proposed by Tom Stephenson in 1935, and finally opened in 1965. Other paths include South Downs Way and Offa's Dyke Path. Major guides to these long-distance footpaths in Britain are provided by HMSO for the Countryside Commission, one of the first being that for the Pennine Way by Tom Stephenson in the 1960s.

== Hillwalking ==
Walks or hikes undertaken in upland country, moorland, and mountains, especially when they include climbing a summit are sometimes described as hillwalking or fellwalking in the United Kingdom. Though hillwalking can entail scrambling to reach a mountain summit, it is not mountaineering. Fellwalking is a word used specifically to refer to hill or mountain walking in Northern England, including the Lake District, Lancashire, especially the Forest of Bowland, and the Yorkshire Dales, where fell is a dialect word for high, uncultivated land.

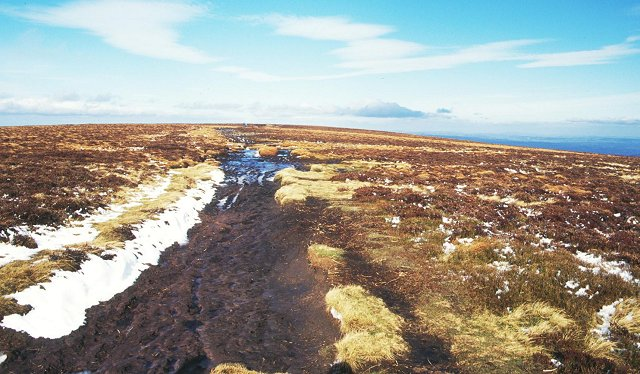
The summit of the Black Mountain, crossed by the Offa's Dyke Path on the English/Welsh border

Popular locations for hillwalking include the Lake District, the Peak District, the Yorkshire Dales, Snowdonia, the Brecon Beacons and Black Mountains, Wales, Dartmoor and the Scottish Highlands. The mountains in Britain are modest in height, with Ben Nevis at 4,409 feet (1,344 m) the highest, but the unpredictably wide range of weather conditions, and often difficult terrain, can make walking in many areas challenging. Peak bagging provides a focus for the activities of many hillwalkers. The first of the many hill lists compiled for this purpose was the Munros—mountains in Scotland over 3,000 feet (910 m)—which remains one of the most popular.

The United Kingdom offers a wide variety of ascents, from gentle rolling lowland hills to some very exposed routes in the moorlands and mountains. The term climbing is used for the activity of tackling the more technically difficult ways of getting up hills involving rock climbing while hillwalking refers to relatively easier routes.

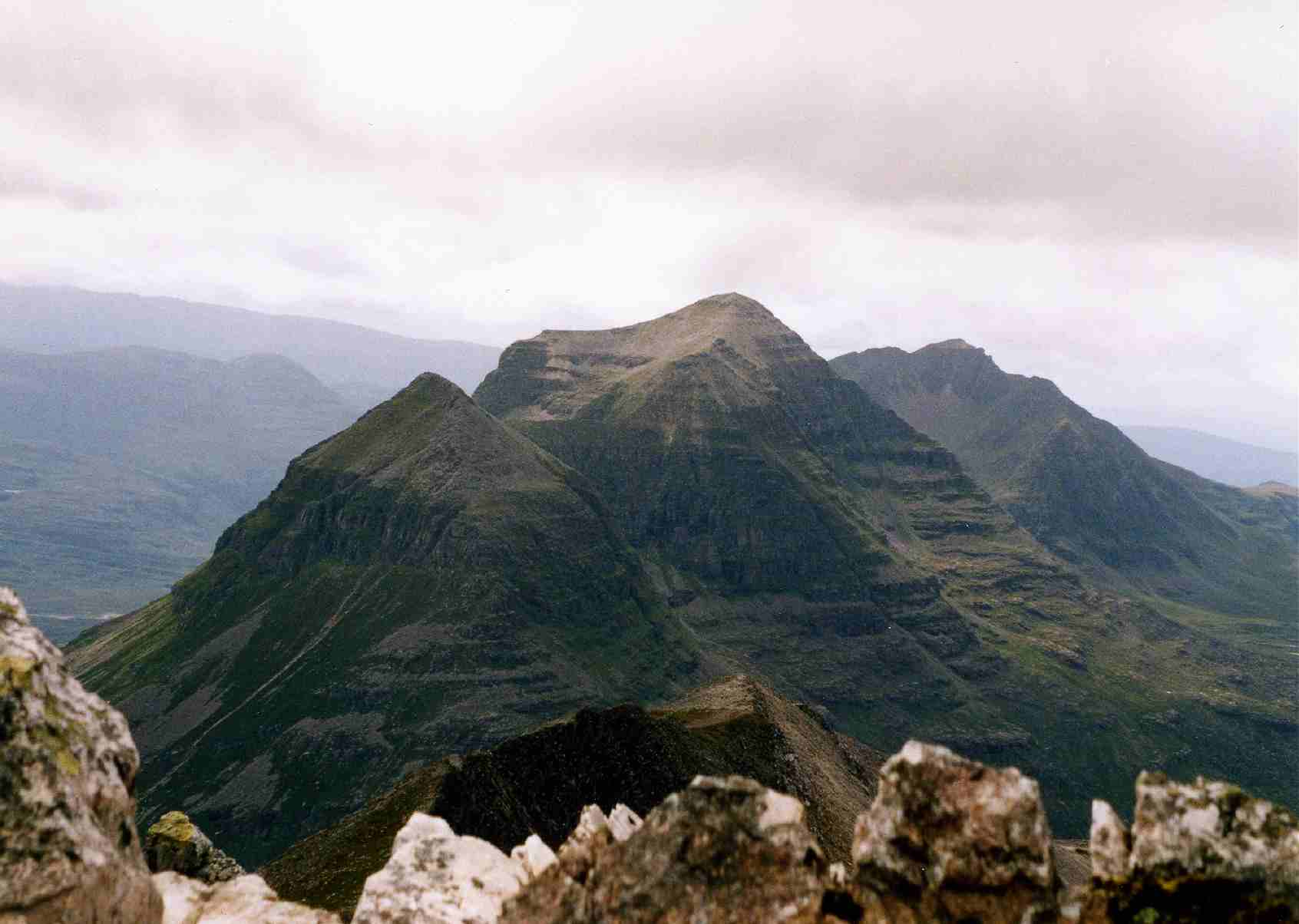
Liathach seen from Beinn Eighe. With the Munro "Top" of Stuc a' Choire Dhuibh Bhig (915 metres) in the foreground and the two Munro summits in the background.

However, many hillwalkers become proficient in scrambling, an activity involving use of the hands for extra support on the crags. It is an ambiguous term that lies somewhere between walking and rock climbing, and many easy climbs are sometimes referred to as difficult scrambles. A distinction can be made by defining any ascent as a climb, when hands are used to hold body weight, rather than just for balance. While much of the enjoyment of scrambling depends on the freedom from technical apparatus, unroped scrambling in exposed situations is potentially one of the most dangerous of mountaineering activities, and most guidebooks advise carrying a rope, especially on harder scrambles, which may be used for security on exposed sections, to assist less confident members of the party, or to facilitate retreat in case of difficulty. Scramblers need to know their limits and to turn back before getting into difficulties. Many easy scrambles in good weather become serious climbs if the weather deteriorates. Black ice or verglas is a particular problem in cold weather, and mist or fog can disorient scramblers very quickly.

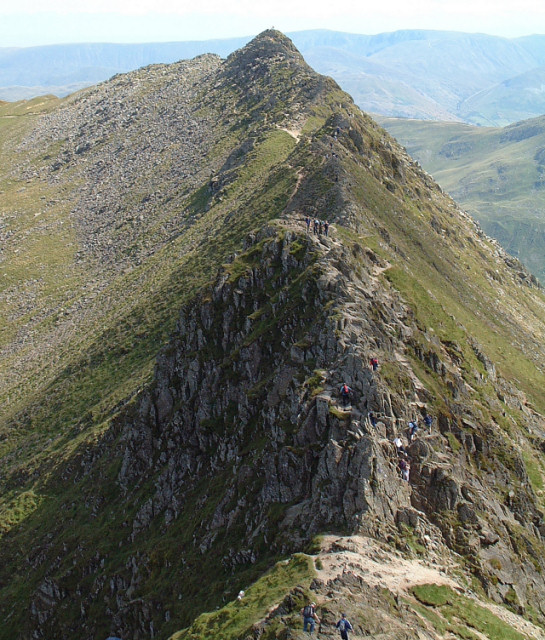
Striding Edge from Helvellyn, English Lake District

Many of the world's mountaintops may be reached by walking or scrambling up their least steep side. In Great Britain ridge routes which involve some scrambling are especially popular, including Crib Goch on Snowdon, the north ridge of Tryfan, Striding Edge on Helvellyn and Sharp Edge on Blencathra in the Lake District, as well as numerous routes in Scotland such as the Aonach Eagach ridge in Glencoe. Many such routes include a "bad step" where the scrambling suddenly becomes much more serious.

In Britain, the term "mountaineering" tends to be reserved for technical climbing on mountains, or for serious domestic hillwalking, especially in winter, with additional equipment such as ice axe and crampons, or for routes requiring rock-climbing skills and a rope, such as the traverse of the Cuillin ridge, on the Scottish island of Skye. The British Mountaineering Council provides more information on this topic.

Navigation and map-reading are essential hillwalking skills on high ground and mountains, due to the variability of British and Irish weather and the risk of rain, low cloud, fog or the onset of darkness. In some areas it is common for there to be no waymarked path to follow. In most areas walking boots are essential along with weatherproof clothing, spare warm clothes, and in mountainous areas a bivvy bag or bothy bag in case an accident forces a prolonged, and possibly overnight halt. Other important items carried by hillwalkers are: food and water, an emergency whistle, a torch (with spare batteries) and a first aid kit. And, where reception permits, a fully charged mobile phone is recommended. Hillwalkers are also advised to let someone know their route and estimated time of return or arrival.

=== Guidebooks ===
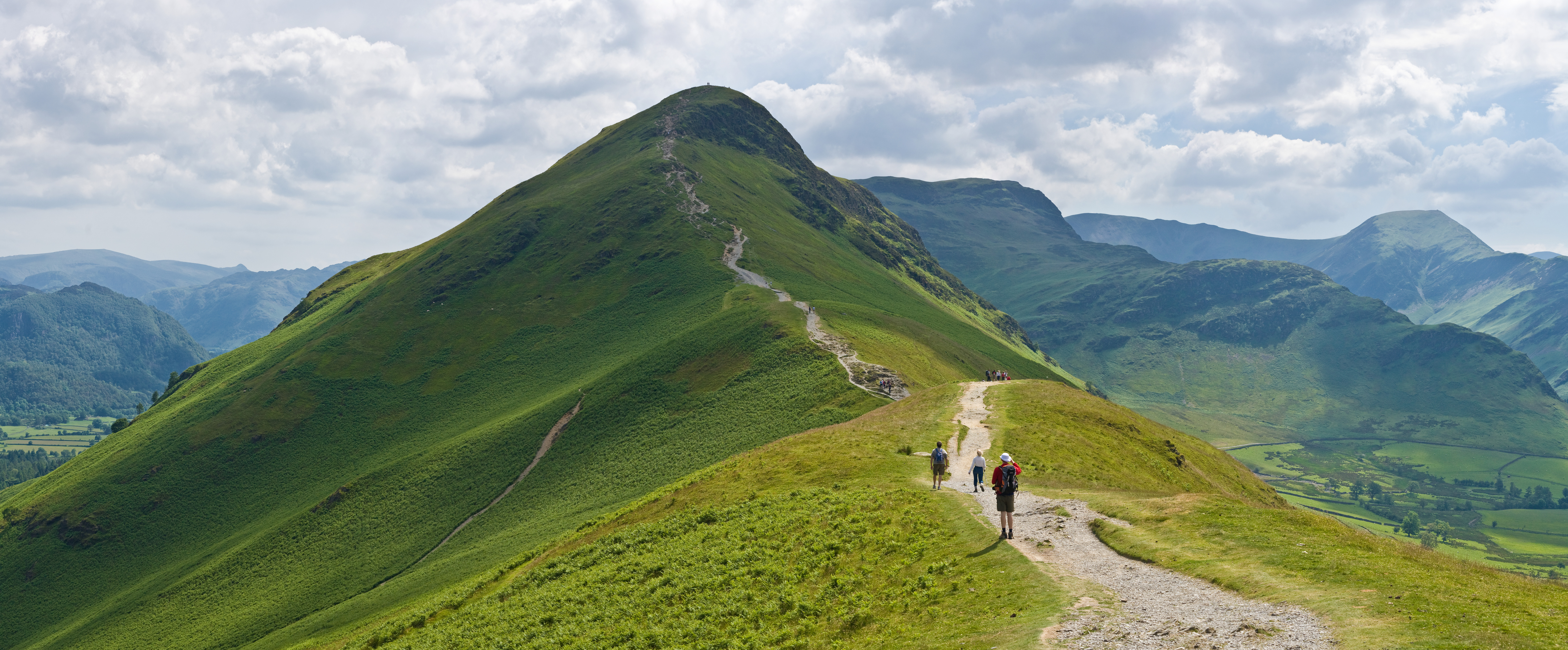
Hillwalkers on Catbells, Lake District, England

W. A. Poucher (1891–1988) wrote several hillwalking guide books, in the 1960s, which describe, in detail, the various routes up specific mountains, along with the precautions needed and other practical information useful to walkers. The guides cover Wales, Peak District, Scotland, Isle of Skye and the Lake District. Even more detailed guides were written by Alfred Wainwright (1907–1991) but these are mainly restricted to the Lake District and environs. His main series of seven books was first published between 1955 and 1966. Both authors describe the major paths, their starting points and the peaks where they end, with important landmarks along each route. Neither is entirely comprehensive.

More recently Mark Richards has written numerous walking guides, especially for the Lake District, for the publisher Cicerone Press, who are now the leading publisher of walking guides in Britain. The Scottish Mountaineering Club are, through the experience and knowledge of their members, the largest publishers of guidebooks to climbing and walking in Scotland.

== Walking in London ==
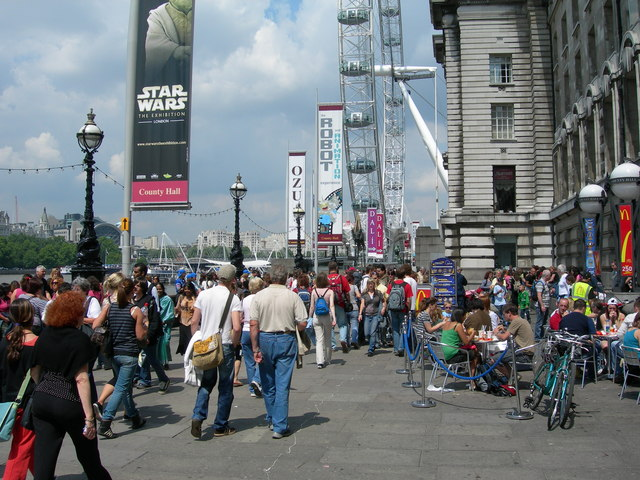
People walking along the South Bank, part of the Jubilee Walkway

Walking is a popular recreational activity in London, despite traffic congestion. There are many areas that provide space for interesting walks, including commons, parks, canals, and disused railway tracks. This includes Wimbledon Common, Hampstead Heath, the eight Royal Parks, Hampton Court Park and Epping Forest. In recent years access to canals and rivers, including the Regent's Canal, and the River Thames has been greatly improved; in addition several long-distance walking routes have been created that link green spaces.

The following are some of long-distance routes in London:

- Capital Ring a 75-mile (121 km) circular route with 15 sections and a radius of approximately 4–8 miles (6.4–12.9 km) from Charing Cross, mostly through the inner Outer London suburbs but also partly in Inner London. The route forms a complete circuit, crossing the River Thames twice and with a suggested starting point at Woolwich;
- Jubilee Walkway a route through central London, originally called the Silver Jubilee Walkway, laid down in 1977 as part of the celebrations of the Silver Jubilee of Elizabeth II. The route takes in many of London's major attractions;
- Lea Valley Walk which starts outside Greater London but has around 12.5 miles (20 km) within its boundary. The route follows the River Lea and the Lee Navigation;
- London Outer Orbital Path ("Loop") a 150-mile (240 km) circular route with 24 sections mostly through Outer London suburbs. The "M25" for walkers, the path is broken because the Thames cannot be crossed between Purfleet and Erith;
- The River Thames Path a National Trail, opened in 1996, following the length of the River Thames, starting outside London at its source near Kemble in Gloucestershire and ending at the Thames Barrier at Charlton. It is about 184 miles (296 km) long. More than 20 miles (32 km) are within London.

== Challenge walks ==
Challenge walks are strenuous walks by a defined route to be completed in a specified time. Many are organised as annual events, with hundreds of participants. In May and June, with longer daylight hours, challenge walks may be 40 or more miles. A few are overnight events, covering distances up to 100 miles. Well-known challenge walks include the Lyke Wake Walk and the Three Peaks Challenge in Yorkshire, and the Three Towers Hike in Berkshire. See also Long Distance Walkers Association.

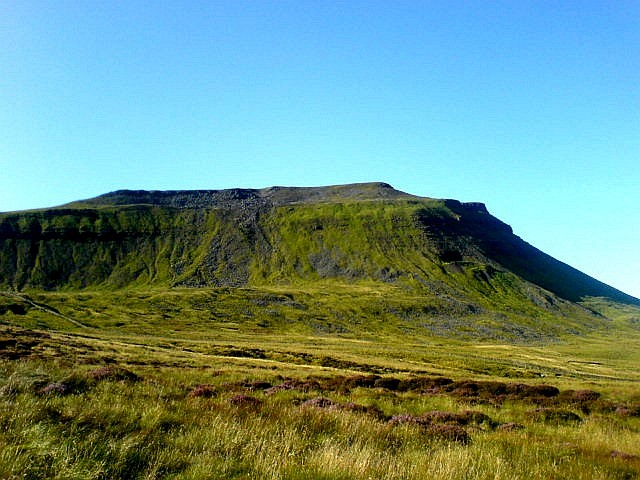
Ingleborough, Yorkshire, which is on the Yorkshire Three Peaks

There are also some challenge walks aimed at children, young adults and youth groups such as the Chase Walk.

== Walking for health ==
In Britain the health benefits of walking are widely recognised. In 1995 a general practitioner named William Bird started the concept of "health walks" for his patients—regular, brisk walks undertaken to improve an individual's health. This led to the formation of the Walking for Health Initiative (WfH, formerly known as 'Walking the way to Health' or WHI) by Natural England and the British Heart Foundation. WfH trains volunteers to lead free health walks from community venues such as libraries and GP surgeries. The scheme has trained more than 35,000 volunteers and there are more than 500 Walking for Health schemes across Britain, with thousands of people walking every week.

== Organisations ==
The government agency responsible for promoting access to the countryside in England is Natural England. In Wales the comparable body is the Countryside Council for Wales, and in Scotland Scottish Natural Heritage. The Ramblers (Britain's Walking Charity) promotes the interests of walkers in Great Britain and provides information for its members and others. Local Ramblers volunteers organise hundreds of group-led walks every week, all across Britain. These are primarily for members; non-members are welcomed as guests for two or three walks.

Among the organisations that promote the interest of walkers are: the Ramblers Association, the British Mountaineering Council, the Mountaineering Council of Scotland, The Online Fellwalking Club, and the Long Distance Walkers Association, which assists users of long-distance trails and challenge walkers. Organisations which provide overnight accommodation for walkers include the Youth Hostels Association in England and Wales, the Scottish Youth Hostels Association, and the Mountain Bothies Association.

London Living Streets is a charity "dedicated to making London one of the world's best cities for walking and enjoying streets and public spaces—a city that is genuinely inclusive of all its residents, workers and visitors and not just designed for car users". It has created Footways, a network of quiet and interesting streets for walking in central London.

== See also ==
- Fastpacking
- List of mountains of the British Isles by height
- Lists of mountains in Ireland
- Ten Essentials (gear)
