= The Ramblers =

Hikers' association in the UK

- Founded: 1 January 1935
- Type: Charity
- Purpose: Promoting walking
- Headquarters: London
- Origins: United Kingdom
- Region served: United Kingdom
- Product: Walking
- Method: Funding
- Members: 101,842
- Chief executive officer: Ross Maloney
- Key people: Tom Stephenson
- Website: www.ramblers.org.uk

The Ramblers' Association, branded as the Ramblers, is a British charity established in 1931 (as the National Council of Ramblers' Federations) to protect public rights of way and access to the countryside. The Ramblers has a paid membership of around 100,000 members and a network of volunteers.

== History ==
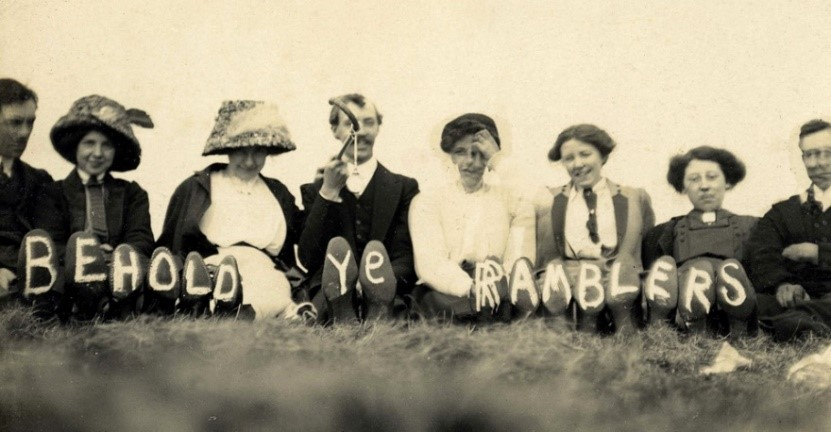

The Association was founded in 1931 because access to the countryside was becoming more of a challenge with many landowners closing off their land and blocking paths. In response, the number of walking clubs and groups that campaigned for walkers' rights grew from the mid-nineteenth century to the 1930s.

In 1931, the National Council of Ramblers' Federations was formed to represent the interests of walkers. On 24 April 1932, the Communist-inspired British Workers' Sports Federation, frustrated at the lack of resolve of the newly formed Ramblers Council, staged a mass trespass of the moorlands of Kinder Scout, in the Peak District. During the mass trespass, the protesters scuffled with the Duke of Devonshire's gamekeepers and five ramblers were arrested. Though The National Council of Ramblers' Federations did not endorse the tactics of the trespassers, this mass action is seen as turning point in the history of rambling. In 1934 the Council decided to change its name, to the Ramblers' Association from 1 January 1935. The first Ramblers' Association office was established in Liverpool in 1938. Ten years later the organisation began to employ a secretary, Tom Stephenson, full-time.

On 28 March 1946 the Ramblers' Association incorporated Ramblers' Association Services Limited, which was intended to operate as the commercial side of the Ramblers' Association; specifically, to manage sales, to provide office services, establish guest houses and to organise walking tours for members at home and abroad. Ramblers' Association Services Ltd (later RWH Travel Ltd) eventually became a separate entity from the Ramblers' Association, (now called Ramble Worldwide). From 1948 its secretary was Tom Stephenson, who was a leading campaigner for open-country access and for the first British long-distance footpath, the Pennine Way.

Labour politician Hugh Dalton, an avid outdoorsman, served a term as president of the Ramblers' Association. Dalton was an environmentalist before the term came into fashion. As Chancellor in 1946 he started the National Land Fund to resource national parks, and in 1951 as Minister of Town and Country Planning he approved the Pennine Way, which involved the creation of seventy additional miles of rights of way.

== Core beliefs ==
The Ramblers promotes access for walkers as a right, and works to protect Britain's network of public paths. Since its inception, the Ramblers has also campaigned for access to all of Britain's green spaces. The Association campaigned for the right of open access through the Countryside and Rights of Way Act 2000 to around 8% of land in England (the CRoW Act) and the England Coast Path through the Marine and Coastal Access Act 2009, and the Land Reform (Scotland) Act 2003 which codified traditional rights of access into law. In its code of conduct, the organisation emphasises the protection of the environment.

== Structure ==
The Ramblers is a charitable company limited by guarantee, registered with the Charity Commission in England and Wales and with OSCR in Scotland. The governing body of the Ramblers is the board of trustees, which comprises up to 15 members. Under devolution agreements, substantial authority is devolved to entities in Scotland and Wales. At local level, activities for members and volunteers are organised through 485 local Groups and 59 regional Areas. Each Area and Group operates through its own constitution, but as part of the overall Ramblers organisation. The General Council is the body of formal company members of the charity that meets annually. Each Ramblers Area is entitled to appoint at least two Council members. It is registered as a charity in England, Scotland and Wales.

On 1 April 2023 Amar Latif, the blind adventurer, was appointed as president of the Ramblers. Prior to this date, the writer and DJ Stuart Maconie had held the role of president for 6 years.

== Achievements ==
Under the leadership of Tom Stephenson, the Ramblers had an important role in the passng of the 1949 National Parks and Access to the Countryside Act, legislation that led to the creation of National Parks, National Trails, the definitive map of rights of way in both England and Wales, and National Nature Reserves across Great Britain.

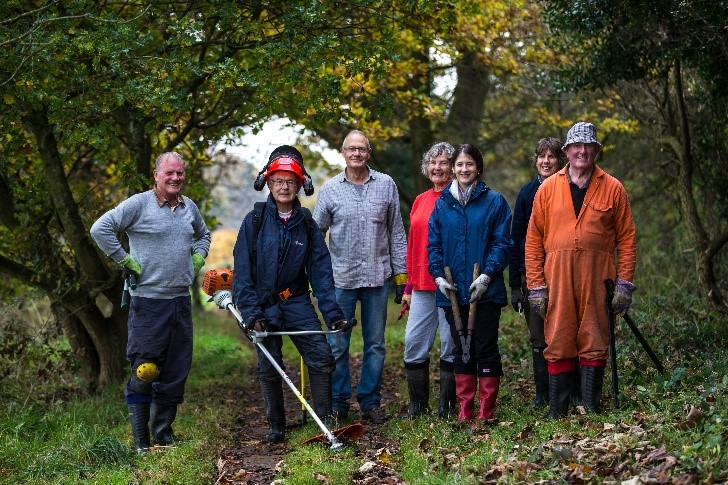
A path maintenance team from The Ramblers.

A long-term goal of the organisation was achieved in 2000 with the passing of The Countryside and Rights of Way Act, which grants the freedom to roam in mapped areas of open countryside in England and Wales.

The Ramblers has also been involved in the campaign for access to the entire coast of England and Wales (under the Marine and Coastal Access Act 2009). The Ramblers helped secure government funding in 2015 for the completion of the England Coast Path by 2020.

Increasingly Ramblers volunteer teams help to maintain footpaths. This has helped maintain the Pennine Way, the Pilgrims' Way, the Saxon Shore Way, Offa's Dyke, The Ridgeway and many other routes, as well as shorter paths.

Along with the Long Distance Walkers Association, the Ramblers is recognised by Sport England as the sport governing body for "rambling" in England.

== Campaigns ==
It campaigns to protect the rights of walkers. A notable case involved Nicholas Van Hoogstraten, the millionaire property tycoon, who has had a long-standing dislike of and dispute with Ramblers. In 1992 Hoogstraten erected a barn, a gate, barbed wire fence, and a refrigeration unit across a footpath on his country estate in East Sussex. Local Ramblers staged a protest against the erection of the fence outside the boundary of Hoogstraten's estate. On 10 February 2003, and after a 13-year battle and numerous legal proceedings, the path was finally re-opened.

Recently, it has opposed proposals to criminalise trespass and opposed some planned level crossing closures, where the diversion is not suitable, for example, taking walkers on to roads without pavements.

In 2015 the Ramblers launched "The Big Pathwatch" to examine the state of the path network in England and Wales. 3,250 volunteers conducted the survey recorded 59,000 problems. The results found 56% of footpaths were well-kept and signposted, 35% were in need of improvement and 9% were difficult or impossible to use with 46,000 photos taken of these issues. Ramblers volunteers continuously maintain these footpaths so the public can enjoy their use freely.

The Countryside and Rights of Way Act introduced a limit for all unrecorded footpaths and bridleways created before 1949 to be recorded before 1 January 2026. The Ramblers increased its training of volunteers on how to claim lost footpaths, and launched a nationwide Don't Lose Your Way campaign to save all lost paths.

The Ramblers works to ensure that legislation governing the countryside and environment helps everyone to connect to nature. This includes green and walkable urban neighbourhoods, well-maintained and well-connected public access, signage to help people navigate through the landscape, and a rich natural environment for everyone to enjoy.

The organisation promotes good neighbourhood planning and design through its urban campaigning and seeks to increase green routes in towns and cities, such as the Walk London Routes (Capital Ring, London Loop etc.) and the Manchester Green Trail Network.

The Ramblers is also active in promoting its Walking For Health schemes, aimed at encouraging people with underlying health conditions to get out walking.

The Ramblers is a part of the Walking and Cycling Alliance with a shared vision that enables collaborative campaigning across the sector.

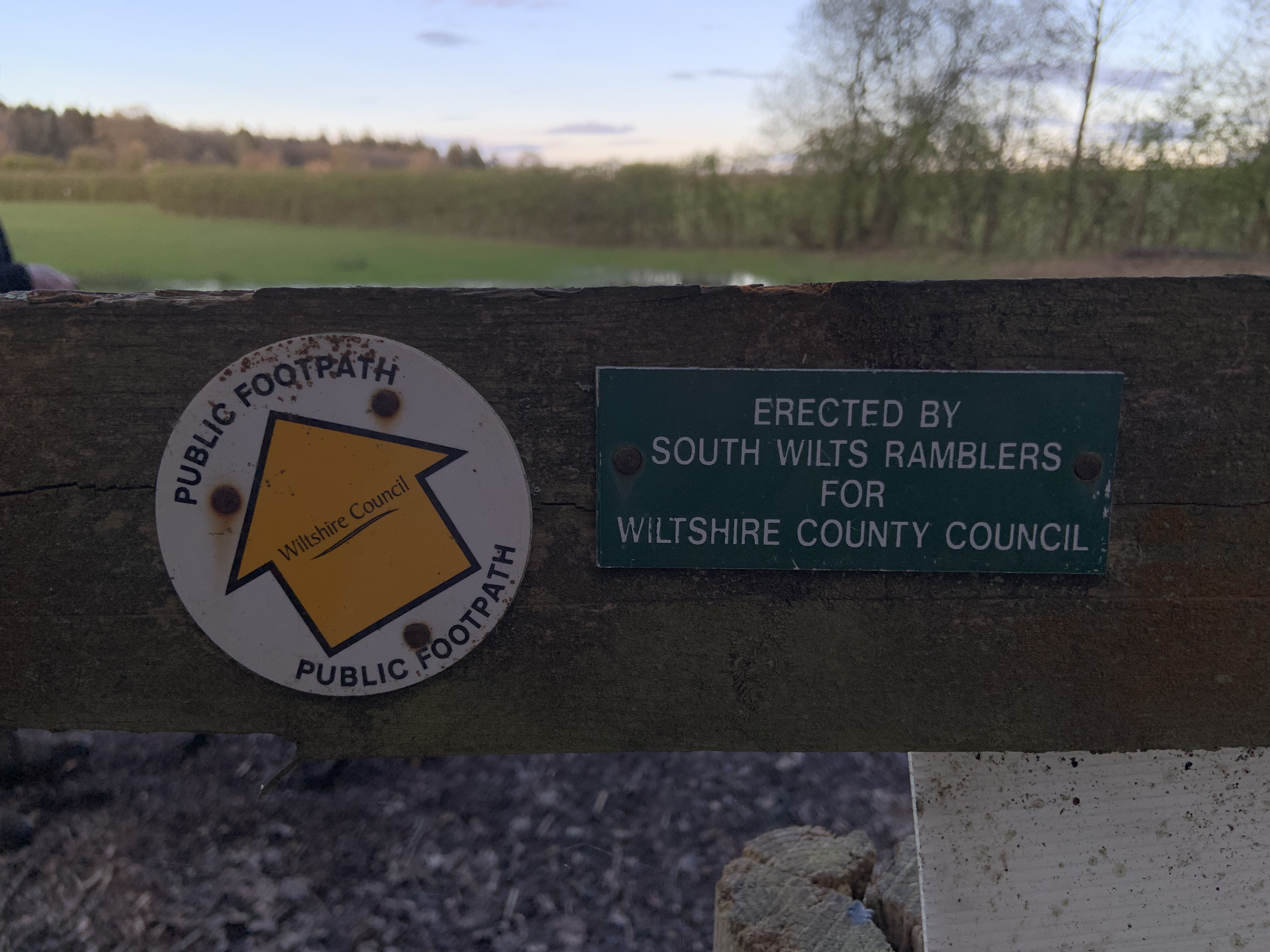
A notice from the South Wilts Ramblers indicating they have helped erect a stile

== Walking experience ==
Local Ramblers groups organize walks, with some targeting specific age ranges, in particular younger individuals. Groups that encourage urban walking also exist.

Ramblers members take their turn in volunteer to lead walks. Walk leaders have to carry out training before they can lead walks on behalf of the Ramblers. See Ramblers online site for further information.

== See also ==
- Backpacking (hiking)
- Freedom to roam
- Hiking
- National Cycle Network
- Right of way (transit)
  - Right of way (disambiguation)
- Trail
- Walking
- Walking in London
- Walking in the United Kingdom
- Youth Hostels Association (England & Wales) and Scottish Youth Hostels Association
