= Freedom to roam =

Right of public access to land or bodies of water

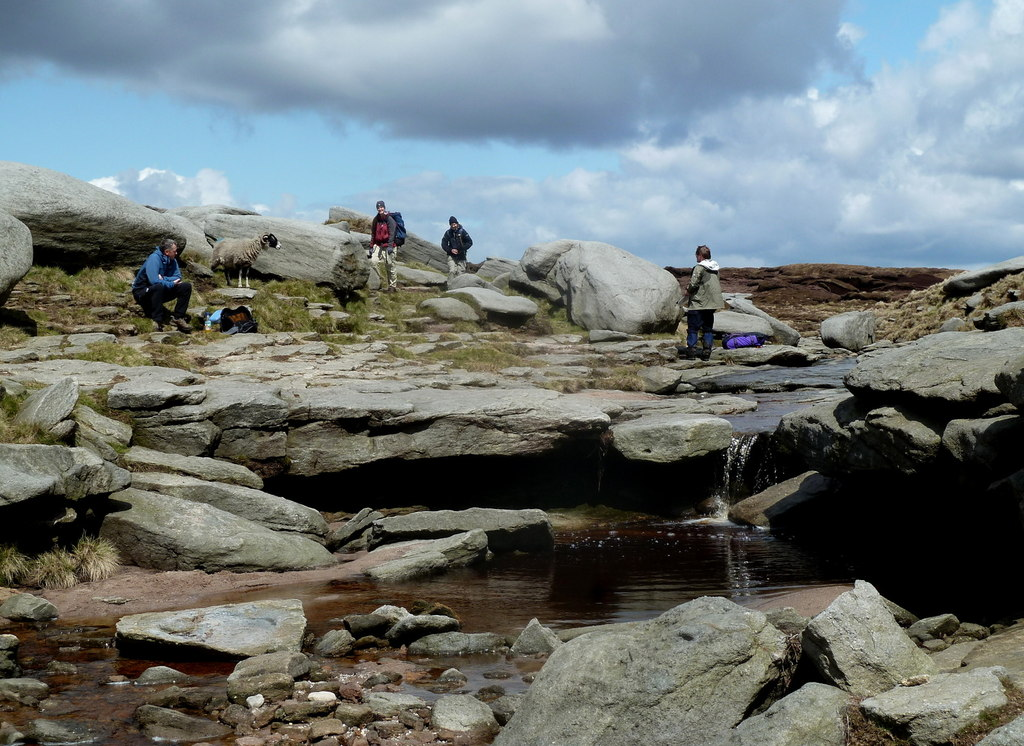
Hikers at Kinder Downfall, Derbyshire, England. Kinder Scout was the site of a mass trespass in 1932.

The freedom to roam or right to roam, also called everyone's right, every person's right or everyman's right, is the general public's right to access certain public or privately owned land, lakes, and rivers for recreation and exercise. The right is sometimes called the right of public access to the wilderness.

In Austria, Belarus, the Czech Republic, Estonia, Finland, Iceland, Latvia, Lithuania, Norway, Scotland, Sweden, and Switzerland, the freedom to roam takes the form of general public rights which are sometimes codified in law. The access is ancient in parts of Northern Europe and has been regarded as sufficiently fundamental that it was not formalised in law until modern times. However, the right usually does not include any substantial economic exploitation, such as hunting or logging, or disruptive activities, such as making fires and driving offroad vehicles.

In countries without such general rights, there may be a network of rights of way, or some nature reserves with footpaths.

== Foreshore ==
Public rights of way frequently exist on the foreshore of beaches. In legal discussions the foreshore is often referred to as the wet-sand area.

For privately owned beaches in the United States, some states such as Massachusetts use the low-water mark as the dividing line between the property of the State and that of the beach owner. Other states such as California use the high-water mark.

In the UK, the foreshore is generally deemed to be owned by the Crown although there are notable exceptions, especially what are termed several fisheries which can be historic deeds to title, dating back to King John's time or earlier, and the Udal Law, which applies generally in Orkney and Shetland. While in the rest of Britain ownership of land extends only to the high water mark, and The Crown is deemed to own what lies below it. In Orkney and Shetland, it extends to the lowest Spring ebb. Where the foreshore is owned by the Crown the public has access below the line marking high tide.

In Greece, according to the L. 2971/01, the foreshore zone is defined as the area of the coast which might be reached by the maximum climbing of the waves on the coast (maximum wave run-up on the coast) in their maximum capacity (maximum referring to the “usually maximum winter waves” and of course not to exceptional cases, such as tsunamis etc.). The foreshore zone, apart from the exceptions in the law, is public, and permanent constructions are not allowed on it.

As with the dry sand part of a beach, legal and political disputes can arise over the ownership and public use of the foreshore. One recent example is the New Zealand foreshore and seabed controversy involving the land claims of the Māori people. However, the Marine and Coastal Area (Takutai Moana) Act 2011 guarantees free public access.

== Government-owned land ==
The public has the right to access some but not all government-owned land. Wilderness areas are typically open for recreational use outside of military facilities. Some land owned by the government because it would otherwise be legally unowned is claimed as the territory of Indigenous people, in countries that were colonised.

=== Crown land in Canada ===
Much of Canada is Crown land owned by the provinces. Some is leased for commercial activity, such as forestry or mining, but on much of it there is free access for recreational activities like hiking, cycling, canoeing, cross-country skiing, horse back riding, and licensed hunting and fishing, etc. At the same time access can be restricted or limited for various reasons (e.g., to protect public safety or resources, including the protection of wild plants and animals). In the Canadian Territories Crown land is administered by the Canadian Federal Government. Canadian National Parks have been created from Crown land and are also administered by the Federal Government. There are also provincial parks and nature reserves that have been similarly created. The Indigenous peoples in Canada may have specific rights on Crown land established under treaties signed when Canada was a British colony, and have claimed ownership of some Crown land.

=== Crown land in Australia ===
Much of Australia's land area, including most land below the mean high water mark is Crown land, which is administered by the Australian states. Much consists of pastoral leases, land owned and run by Aboriginal people (e.g. APY lands), and "unallocated" Crown land. Access to the latter is normally permitted for recreational purposes, though motorized vehicles are required to follow roads and to be registered and insured.

=== Public land in the US ===
Most state and federally managed public lands are open for recreational use. Recreation opportunities depend on the managing agency, and run the gamut from the free-for-all, undeveloped wide open spaces of the Bureau of Land Management lands to the highly developed and controlled US national parks and state parks. Wildlife refuges and state wildlife management areas, managed primarily to improve habitat, are generally open to wildlife watching, hiking, and hunting, except for closures to protect mating and nesting, or to reduce stress on wintering animals. National forests generally have a mix of maintained trails and roads, wilderness and undeveloped portions, and developed picnic and camping areas.

== Criticism ==
In recent years increased mobility and affluence have made previously remote areas more accessible and though significant harm or damage is unusual, endangered species are being disturbed, and litter left, by some recreational users.

Helena Jonsson, the President of the Federation of Swedish Farmers, argued in 2011 that the way land was used had changed and that the law was out of date and needed to be revised, so as "to bar commercial interests from using the law as an excuse to make a profit while they are on other people's private property".

== By area ==
=== Europe ===
==== Nordic countries ====
Ancient traces provide evidence of the freedom to roam in many European countries, suggesting such a freedom was once a common norm. Today, the right to roam has survived in perhaps its purest form in Estonia, Finland, Iceland, Norway and Sweden. There the right has been won through practice over hundreds of years and it is not known when it changed from mere 'common practice' to become a commonly recognised right.

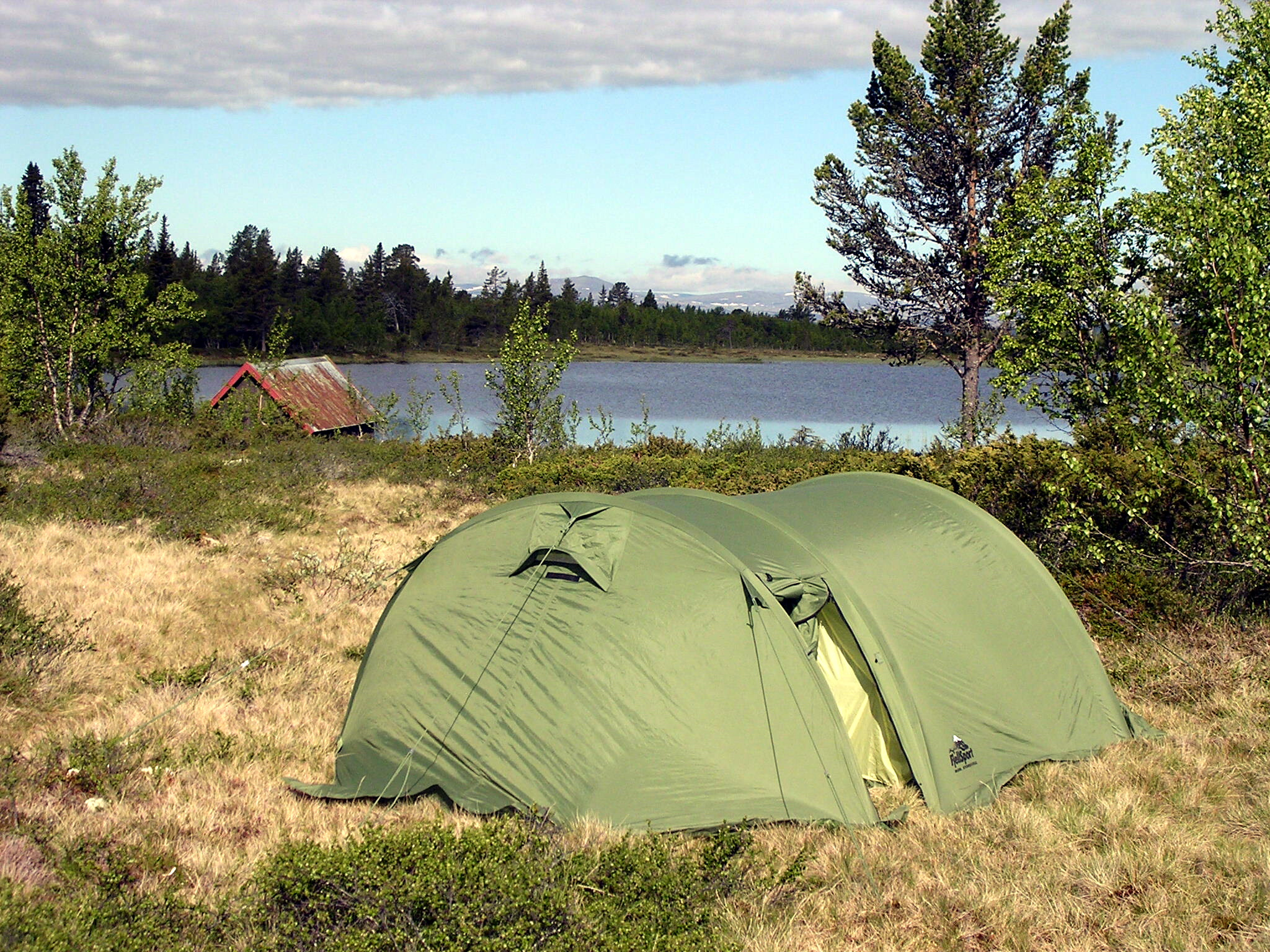
Camping in a forest in Femundsmarka National Park, Norway

Today these rights underpin opportunities for outdoor recreation in several of the Nordic countries, providing the opportunity to hike across or camp on another's land (e.g. in Sweden for one or two nights), boating on someone else's waters, and picking wildflowers, mushrooms and berries. However, with these rights come responsibilities; that is, an obligation neither to harm, disturb, litter, nor to damage wildlife or crops.

Access rights are most often for travel on foot. Rights to fish, hunt or take any other product are usually constrained by other customs or laws. Building a fire is often prohibited (though in Sweden and Norway fires are allowed with proper safety precautions). Making noise is discouraged. In some countries, putting up a tent in the forest for one night is allowed, but not the use of a caravan. Access does not extend to built up or developed land, such as houses or gardens, and does not necessarily include commercial exploitation of the land. For example, workers picking berries may be legal only with the landowner's permission.

There are some significant differences in the rules of different countries. In Denmark, there is a more restricted freedom to roam on privately held land. All dunes and beaches and all publicly owned forests are open to roaming. Uncultivated, unfenced areas are open to daytime roaming irrespective of ownership status. Privately owned forest have access by roads and tracks only.

===== Finland =====
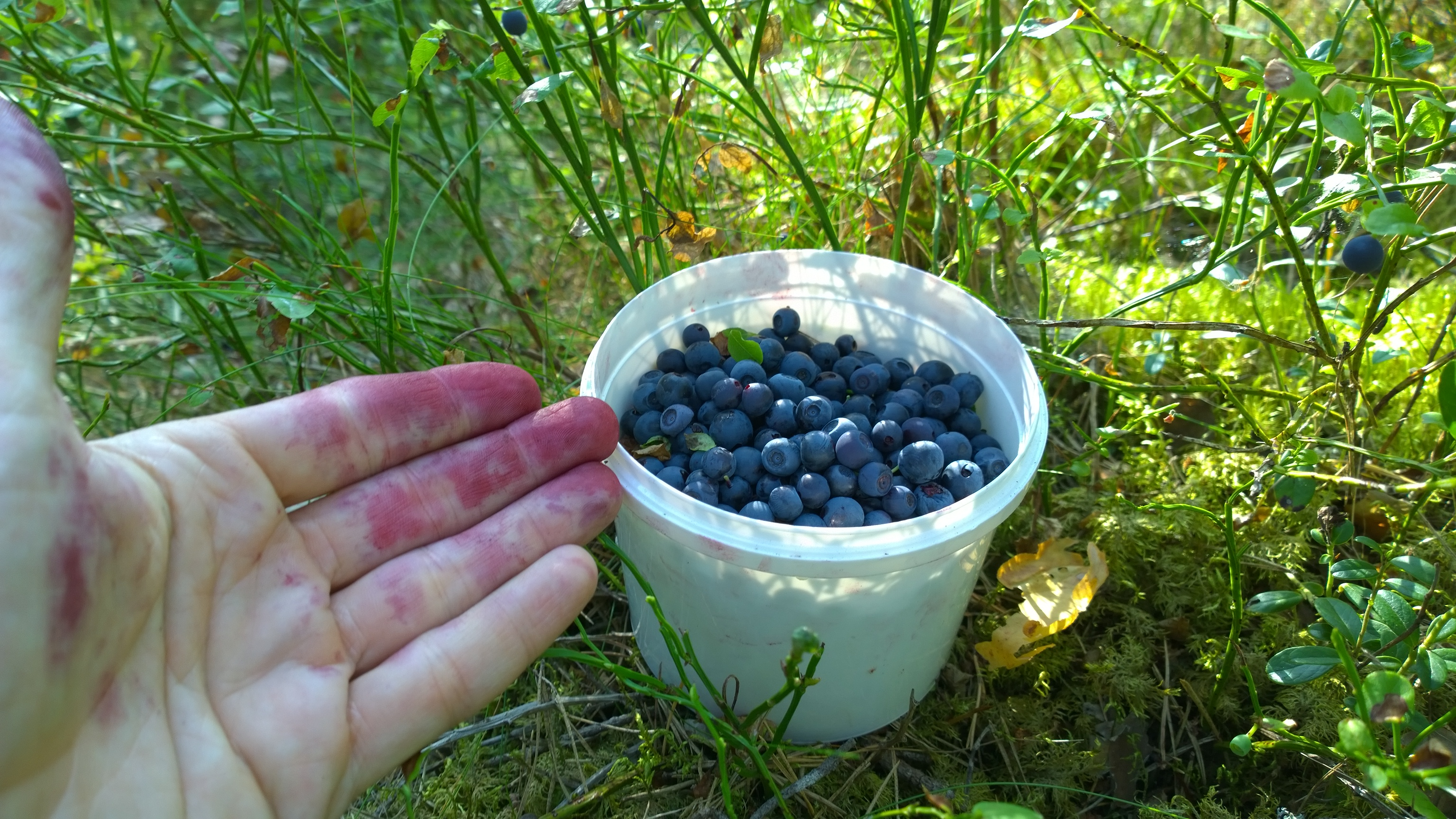
In Finland, picking berries is an "everyone's right".

In Finland, "jokaisenoikeus" in Finnish (everyone's right) has formally replaced the older term "jokamiehenoikeus" (every man's right) to refer to the freedom to roam and related rights. The term in Swedish is "allemansrätten" (lit. "everyone's right"), similar to other Nordic countries.

The right is not codified in any specific law. Instead, it arises from the principle of nulla poena sine lege - what is not illegal cannot be punished. Things that are not explicitly disallowed, are allowed by default.

Everyone may walk, ski, ride a horse or cycle freely in the countryside where this does not harm the natural environment or the landowner, except in gardens or in the immediate vicinity of people's homes (yards). Fields and plantations, which may easily be harmed, may usually not be crossed except in the winter. It is also possible to establish outdoor recreation routes on private land, based on an agreement on the rights of use or by official proceedings in accordance with the Outdoor Recreation Act, for example.

One may stay or set up camp temporarily in the countryside, a reasonable distance from homes, pick mineral samples, wild berries, mushrooms and flowers if they are not protected species. One may fish with a rod and line in still waters, row, sail or use a motorboat on waterways, though with certain restrictions, and swim or bathe in both inland waters and the sea. One can walk, ski and ice fish on frozen lakes, rivers and the sea. Income from selling picked berries or mushrooms is tax-free. In the autonomous province of Åland the inclusion of the right to camp in the "right to roam" was disputed, but since 2013, this is no longer the case.

When traveling with a motorhome or camper, one can park and spend the night anywhere where parking is allowed, including along public roads. Checking parking area signs is essential to ensure compliance with overnight stay regulations. Private and forest roads can serve as suitable parking spots, as long as there are no signage restrictions. Off-road driving requires landowner permission, but parking off-road near the road is allowed for convenience. Overnight stays are generally prohibited in shopping center parking lots, but service stations often provide suitable facilities. When visiting national parks, designated areas or parking lots may allow overnight stays, potentially requiring a permit. Nature reserves have specific rules regarding overnight stays.

One may not disturb others or damage property, disturb breeding birds or their nests or young, or disturb reindeer or game animals. One may not cut down or damage living trees, or collect wood, moss or lichen on other people's property, nor may one light open fires without the landowner's permission unless there is an emergency. It is acceptable, however, to use an alcohol burner, wood stove or similar device that has no hot parts touching the ground. One may not disturb the privacy of people's homes by camping too near to them or making too much noise, nor litter, drive motor vehicles off-road without the landowner's permission, or fish (excluding angling) or hunt without the relevant permits. If horse riding causes more than a minor inconvenience or disturbance, an agreement for the long term use of the route must be made with the landowner. A horse may also be taken to swim in a water body without the consent of the owner of the water area (excluding public beaches).

===== Norway =====
Everyone in Norway enjoys the right of access to, and passage through, uncultivated land in the countryside. The right is an old consuetudinary law called the allemannsrett (lit. the everyman's right), that was codified in 1957 with the implementation of the Outdoor Recreation Act. It is based on respect for the countryside, and all visitors are expected to show consideration for farmers and landowners, other users and the environment. In Norway the terms utmark and innmark divide areas where the right to roam is valid (utmark, literally something like "land outside [the boundaries]"/"[Out Field]") and where it is invalid or restricted (innmark, "land inside [the boundaries]"/"[In Field]"). The law specifies innmark thoroughly, and all areas not covered by this definition are defined as utmark, generally speaking uninhabited and uncultivated areas. Cultivated land may only be crossed when frozen or covered in snow.

There are some basic rules that must be followed when camping in Norway:

- People are allowed to camp at least 150 metres away from the nearest inhabited house or cottage.
- Campfires are not allowed in the forest areas between 15 April to 15 September, unless it obviously can not lead to a fire.
- Tourists are allowed to stay in one spot for up to two days. After that, it is necessary to specifically ask for permission from the landowner. This rule excludes the mountains and the national parks.
- With a motorhome or a camper, it is allowed to park and spend the night anywhere parking is allowed, including along a public road, unless camping is explicitly forbidden. Often this right is however limited to one or two overnight stays.

In later years the right has come under pressure particularly around the Oslo Fjord and in popular areas of Southern Norway. These areas are popular sites for holiday homes and many owners of coastal land want to restrict public access to their property. As a general rule, building and partitioning of property is prohibited in a 100-metre zone closest to the sea, but local authorities in many areas have made liberal use of their ability to grant exemptions from this rule. However, even if a land owner has been permitted to build closer to the shore, he may not restrict people from walking along the shore. Fences and other barriers to prevent public access are not permitted (but yet sometimes erected, resulting in heavy fines).

Canoeing, kayaking, rowing and sailing in rivers, lakes, and ocean are allowed. Motorised boats are only permitted in salt water. All waters are open for swimming – with the exception of lakes that are drinking water reservoirs (see for instance Maridalsvannet).

Wild berry foraging is part of the right. Picking cloudberries may, however, be restricted on privately owned land in northern parts of Norway.

Hunting rights belong to the landowner, and thus hunting is not included in the right of free access. In freshwater areas such as rivers and lakes, the fishing rights belong to the landowner. Freshwater fishing may only be conducted with the permission of the landowner and by those in possession of a fishing licence. Different rules apply for children under the age of 16. Children under the age of 16 have the right to fish without a licence, a right codified in 1992. This right was tried and upheld in a ruling from the Norwegian Supreme Court in 2004.

In salt water areas there is free access to sports fishing using boats or from the shoreline. All fishing is subject to legislation to, among other things, protect biological diversity, and this legislation stipulates rules regarding the use of gear, seasons, bag or size limits and more.

===== Sweden =====
In Sweden allemansrätten (lit. "the everyman's right") is a freedom granted by the Constitution of Sweden. Since 1994 the Instrument of Government says that notwithstanding the right to own property "everyone shall have access to nature in accordance with allemansrätten". What this means is not further explicated on in the constitution, and only sparsely in other legislation. In practice, allemansrätten is defined as actions that are not crimes, will not make a person liable to pay damages, nor can be prohibited by any authority. As in other Nordic countries, the Swedish right to roam comes with an equal emphasis being placed upon the responsibility to look after the countryside; the maxim is "do not disturb, do not destroy". Many Swedish people consider this to be a form of legacy or human right.

Allemansrätten gives a person the right to access, walk, cycle, ride, ski, and camp on any land—with the exception of private gardens, the immediate vicinity of a dwelling house and land under cultivation. Restrictions apply for nature reserves and other protected areas. It also gives the right to pick wild flowers, mushrooms and berries (provided they are not legally protected), but not to hunt in any way. Swimming in any lake and putting an unpowered boat on any water is permitted unless explicitly forbidden. Visiting beaches and walking by a shoreline is permitted, providing it is not a part of a garden or within the immediate vicinity of a residence (legally defined as the hemfridszon). The hemfridszon's size depends on conditions but can be as large as 70 metres from an ordinary dwelling house. To better protect access to water and the right to walk along beaches, it is since 1975 generally not permitted to build a new house near (generally 100 m from) a beach and/or shoreline.

Fishing remains essentially private—apart from on the biggest five lakes and the coast of the Baltic Sea, the Sound, Kattegat and Skagerrak. It is permitted to drive a car on a private road unless explicitly signposted otherwise. Small camp fires are generally permitted, but in some periods banned by local authorities due to wild fire risk. It is allowed to put up a tent on any uncultivated land for a night or two. There has been some controversy on commercial use of the berry picking rights, when companies legally contract people to pick berries in the forests.

Building a fire is generally permitted except on bare rock faces where it can lead to cracking. Municipalities can issue fire bans during dry periods.

With a motorhome or camper, you can park and spend the night anywhere parking is allowed, including along public roads. Driving off-road with caravans and mobile homes is not permitted. At rest areas, the usual maximum stay for overnight stays is around 24 hours on weekdays, with slightly longer durations on weekends. Additional rules will be posted on rest area signs. There are no specific regulations regarding how long you can park your motor vehicle adjacent to a non-off-road road.

Exercise of the rights is overseen by the County Administrative Boards—which can, for example, force the removal of a fence if it obstructs access to areas that are important to the allemansrätt.

===== Iceland =====
Like other Nordic countries Icelandic law contains a version of the freedom to roam, the right to access uncultivated land and pick berries. "It is permissible to cross uncultivated private property without seeking any special permission, but landowners may limit routes with signs or other marks. State-owned land such as conservation areas and forestry areas are open to everyone with few exceptions. These exceptions include – but are not limited to – access during breeding seasons or during sensitive growth periods".

Hikers should, however, "avoid taking shortcuts over fenced areas, pastures and private plots", and follow the rules in conservation areas. Footpaths should also be followed, if they exist, to help protect the landscape. Furthermore, "landowners may not hinder passage of walkers alongside rivers, lakes and ocean, or on tracks and paths'. Cycling may be restricted on some paths. Equestrians must keep to bridleways where they exist and in other places show "consideration for the land".

In many areas, like South and East Iceland, only in uninhabited areas that are not protected, a maximum of 3 tents may be pitched up for one night, if there is no camp-site in vicinity.

Motorized travellers with motorhomes (RV), camping cars (campers) and trailers must always stay on an official campsite.

In national parks, it is forbidden to stay overnight outside an official camp-site, both for motorized and non-motorized travellers.

Fishing requires a license but collecting "berries, mushrooms, seaweed and other plants for immediate consumption" is permitted on "public lands and highland pastures".

==== Estonia ====
In Estonia, it is permitted to access natural and cultural landscapes on foot, by bicycle, ski, boat, or on horseback.

Private property may be accessed at any time. If the private property is fenced or posted against trespassing, the permission of the owner is required to proceed. The owner of the private property is also required to post signs stating the ownership of the land, and contact numbers, to avoid legal issues. Land owners may not block access to land, roads or bodies of water that are public or are designated for public use, including ice and shore paths.

All bodies of water that are public or designated for public use have public shore paths that are up to 4 m wide. The shore path along a navigable body of water may extend to a distance of 10 m from the water line. The owner may not close this path even if the private property is posted or marked with no-trespassing signs. Grazing areas and other enclosed areas along the shore paths must have stiles. Ponds with no outlet located entirely on the land of one land owner and lakes smaller than five hectares located on land belonging to more than one land owner shall not be in public use. Permission from the landowner is required to access such bodies of water.

Neither do bodies of water protected as sources of drinking water or which are in use by aquaculture or are in other special use have a shore path. All of the rights and responsibilities regarding humans’ interaction with nature are collectively termed everyman's right. Everyman's right does not pertain to the organizing of sporting events or other public events in open country. To organize these, the permission of the landowners or other possessors of land, and if necessary, of the local government, must be sought.

The following is permitted in nature:

- accessing areas by foot, on bicycle, skis, boat or horseback in all places not prohibited on the basis of law(s);
- being present in any area where access is permitted;
- gathering wild berries, mushrooms, flowers, medicinal plants, hazelnuts and other natural products not under nature protection;
- fishing bodies of water that are public or designated for public use with a simple hand line.

The following is prohibited:

- accessing the immediate proximity of a person's yard, plantations, apiaries, sown crops, grain field and other cropland where damage is thereby incurred by the owner;
- lighting fires and camping without permission from the land owner or possessor;
- hunting and fishing without relevant license, except for simple hand line;
- injuring trees and bushes;
- disrupting the peace of local inhabitants;
- damaging the habitats and nests of forest animals and birds, gathering or removing their eggs, or otherwise doing harm to them;
- damaging nature protection objects and protected species;
- using motor vehicles where prohibited;
- polluting nature.

==== Belarus ====
Article 13 of Section I of the Constitution of Belarus guarantees that all forest and farm land is publicly owned. Forty percent of the country's territory is covered by forest, and approximately the same amount devoted to agriculture.

According to the Forest Code (Article 13) "citizens have the right to freely stay in the forest and collect wild fruits, berries, nuts, mushrooms, other food, forest resources and medicinal plants to meet their own needs."

==== Austria ====
The right to roam in Austria, particularly in forests and mountainous areas, is called Wegefreiheit. Since 1975 the right to roam in forests is guaranteed by Federal law. In particular, walking, running, hiking, and resting are automatically allowed to the public in most forest areas. However, horse riding, bike riding, and camping are not, and may only be practised with the land owner's permission. A large proportion of the forest area in Austria is owned by government bodies such as the Austrian State Forestry Commission, but the same restrictions still apply. In some circumstances forests may be closed to the public for environmental reasons. The situation in mountainous areas is less clear, and differs from state to state. Some states, such as Carinthia, Styria, and Salzburg guarantee a right to roam in mountainous areas (usually defined as above the tree line), for all recreational activities. In other states, such as Tyrol, Lower Austria, and Burgenland, no explicit right to roam exists and land owners reserve the right to deny access. In practice, however, such restrictions are rarely enforced, since mountain tourism is an important industry in Austria.

==== Czech Republic ====
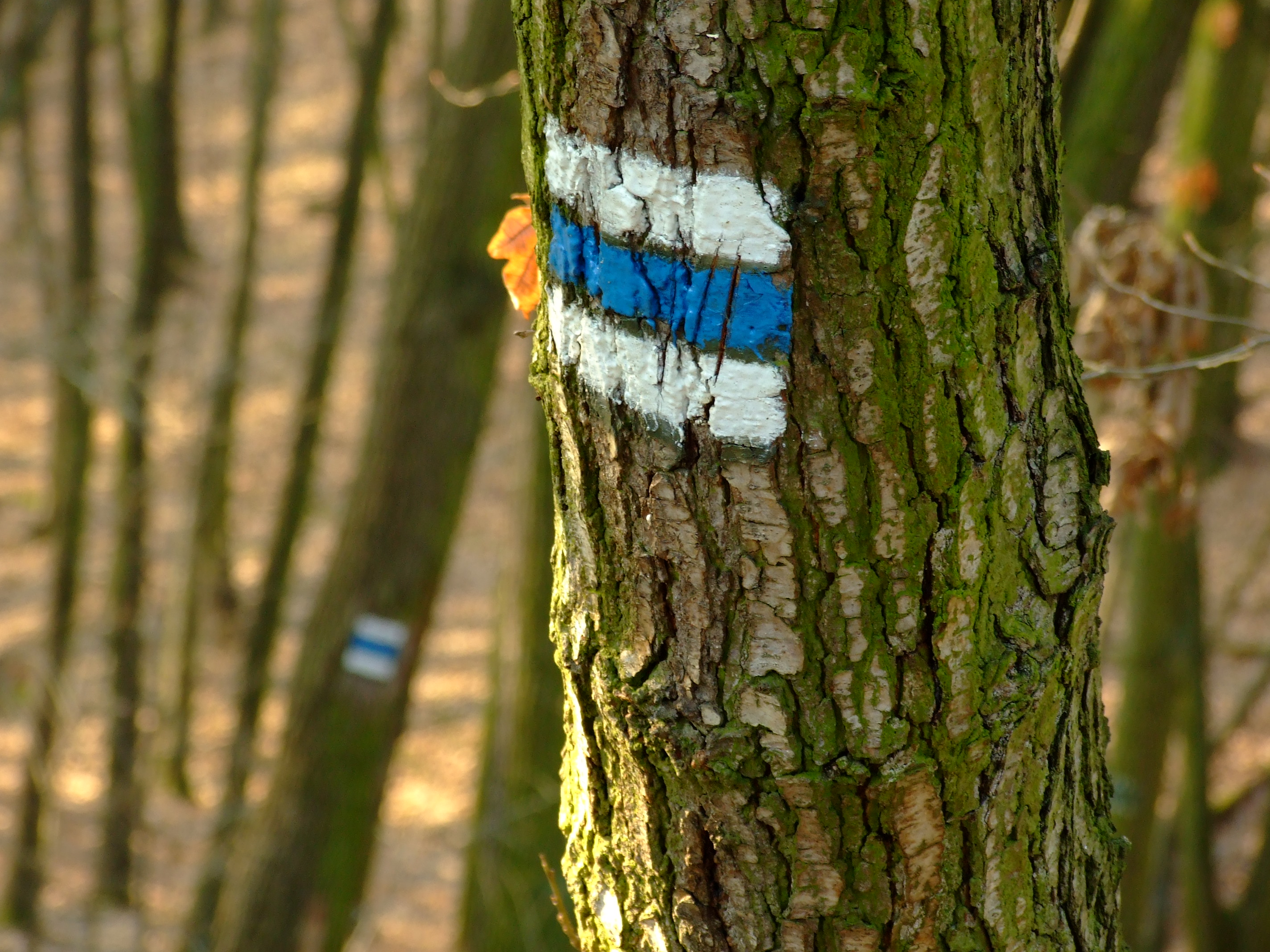
Czech Hiking Markers System for trail blazing has been adopted in Central Europe and elsewhere.

The old legal institute of "right of the way" (imbedded in the Civil Code) has its roots in Austro-Hungarian law. This legal institution is applied when one land owner has a need to go through alien lands for access to his own land.

The Nature and Countryside Preservation Act gives a legal right to roam through country ("veřejná přístupnost krajiny", public accessibility of countryside or wilderness – excluding parcels owned by a natural person). Some types of land are excluded from compulsory public accessibility: settled and building grounds, courtyards, gardens, orchards, vineyards, hop gardens, grounds destined for animal husbandry. Fields and arable land are excluded during seasons when herbage or soil would be damaged, pasture lands are excluded during cattle grazing. In national natural preserves, national natural monuments, national parks and in the first zones of landscape protected areas, state authorities can restrict public access (ordinarily only to roads or only to marked routes). Special acts can exclude also other areas (e. g. military areas, rail tracks etc.).

According to Forest Act, forests are publicly accessible ("obecné užívání lesa", common use of forest – including private ones) and citizens have a legal right to enter the forests. The right of gathering dry twigs lying on the ground and berries for personal purpose is also guaranteed. However, biking, sledge riding, skiing and horseback riding are allowed only on forest roads. Public motor vehicle riding is prohibited (highroads going through forest are not considered as parts of the forest – because they are not considered as "forest land" in land registration). Common use of forest can be restricted by the owner in military forests, protected areas, forest nurseries, forest orchards, deer parks, pheasantries etc.

The Road Act defines obecné užívání pozemních komunikací (common use of roads – some road can be excluded), The Water Act defines "obecné užívání povrchových vod" (common use of surface waters).

==== Italy ====
In Italy there is not a general right to roam: this was established by jurisprudence in 1999 (Cassazione civile, sez. III, 27/08/1999, n. 8997). Privately owned land is not accessible when marked as such, while access to publicly owned land is generally free. Berries and mushrooms can be picked on publicly owned land but may be restricted in quantity/species and/or subjected to a fee, according to regional laws.

The privatisation of beaches in Italy, 2021

It can be estimated that only half of the country's beaches are freely accessible and usable for bathing. In fact, almost 43% of the Italian sandy coastline is occupied by bathing establishments, while 7.2% is polluted or not monitored. The situation varies from region to region; although the European Union has been asking Italy for years to have more free beaches, the number of free beaches has declined.

==== Switzerland ====
The freedom to roam is guaranteed in Switzerland by the Swiss Civil Code. However, some cantons have more detailed regulations concerning the rights of access of otherwise not authorised people.

The Swiss Civil Code provides that forest and pasture are accessible freely for everyone, as long as there is no excessive usage. Except in special cases like the protection of young forest or biotopes it is not allowed to fence in forest areas. This also applies to private property. Certain activities related to excessive usage and the potential to cause damage, such as events in the woods, or access with cars, may be dependent on special authorisation. Similar regulations are in place for land which is not usable (e.g. stretches of water, rock, snow and ice), regardless of the land being unowned (i.e. being under the control of the canton and not able to be claimed as private property) or privately owned. The canton may also choose to restrict the freedom to roam in order to protect nature (e.g. the gathering of mushrooms, berries, wood, etc. in forests).

==== Germany ====
In Germany a limited right to roam, called Betretungsrecht, is guaranteed by multiple federal laws. The Federal Nature Conservation Act, the Federal Forest Act and the Federal Water Management Act allow everyone access to open landscape, uncultivated land, forests and water bodies, including cycling and horse-riding on tracks and paths. The right may be further regulated through state law.

The Constitution of Bavaria guarantees everyone "the enjoyment of natural beauty and recreation in the outdoors, in particular the access to forests and mountain meadows, the use of waterways and lakes and the appropriation of wild fruits". The right is nicknamed Schwammerlparagraph (mushroom clause). The article also obliges "every person to treat nature and the landscape with care". "The state and the municipalities shall be entitled and obliged to maintain free access to mountains, lakes, rivers and other beautiful sceneries and to create free access by restricting property rights and to create hiking trails and recreational parks".

==== United Kingdom ====
In the United Kingdom, outside Scotland, access to much uncultivated and unenclosed land was restricted prior to the enactment of the Countryside and Rights of Way Act 2000. Access to land in England and Wales is still more limited than in most of Northern Europe, and some other European countries, while access is very limited in Northern Ireland. Property was formerly protected in England and Wales mostly to preserve the landowner's hunting or fishing rights. The Ramblers' Association, which works to increase the rights of walkers in the United Kingdom, was a driving force behind this legislation.

===== England and Wales =====
In England and Wales, after a polarised debate about the merits, rights and benefits of private landowners and public recreation, in 2000 the Government legislated to introduce a limited right to roam, without compensation for landowners. The Countryside and Rights of Way Act 2000 (CROW) was gradually implemented from 2000 onwards to give the general public the conditional right to walk in certain areas of the English and Welsh countryside: principally downland, moorland, heathland and coastal land. Forests and woodlands are excluded, other than publicly owned forests, which have a similar right of access by virtue of a voluntary dedication made by the Forestry Commission. Developed land, gardens and certain other areas are specifically excluded from the right of access. Agricultural land is accessible if it falls within one of the categories described above. People exercising the right of access have certain duties to respect other people's rights to manage the land, and to protect nature.

The new rights were introduced region by region through England and Wales, with completion in 2005. Maps showing accessible areas have been produced. This added to the legal right to use established public footpaths and bridleways, some common land and access to the foreshore. Land owners may prevent access to other areas (or charge a fee for access).

Angling interests successfully lobbied for the exclusion of rivers in England and Wales from CROW, leaving other river users such as swimmers and canoeists with access restricted to less than 2% of navigable water. The British Canoe Union is running the Rivers Access Campaign, to highlight the level of restrictions the public face in gaining access to inland waterways in England and Wales.

Since the Dartmoor Commons Act 1985, much of the Dartmoor National Park has been designated as "access land", with no restrictions on where walkers can roam, although it remains privately owned. Because of the 1985 act, Dartmoor was largely unaffected by the Countryside and Rights of Way Act 2000, which established similar rights in other rural parts of the country, but in 2006, this act opened up much of the remaining restricted land to walkers. In 2025, the UK Supreme Court upheld the right to roam on the park, with judges saying regulation would be more effective at protecting it than private enforcement by property owners.

The Marine and Coastal Access Act 2009 extended access rights to land near the English coast.

===== Scotland =====
In Scotland the Land Reform (Scotland) Act 2003 comprehensively codified into Scots law the ancient tradition of the right to universal access to the land in Scotland. The act specifically establishes a right to be on land for recreational, educational and certain other purposes and a right to cross land. The rights exist only if they are exercised responsibly, on which the Scottish Outdoor Access Code provides guidance.

Access rights apply to any non-motorised activities, including walking, cycling, horse-riding and wild camping. They also allow access on inland water for canoeing, rowing, sailing and swimming. The rights confirmed in the Scottish legislation are greater than the limited rights of access created in England and Wales by the Countryside and Rights of Way Act 2000 (CRoW).

===== Northern Ireland =====
Access rights in Northern Ireland have been described as being "the most regressive and restrictive access legislation in Europe. Most of the routes used to reach [...] mountains, hills, seashores, rivers and national monuments pass over private land. In almost all cases, the walker has no right to be there." The Access to the Countryside (Northern Ireland) Order 1983 gave some rights, but access is generally modelled on the restrictive 1949 English/Welsh law. The absence of a tradition of access, political influence of landowners and problems of governance have been blamed for the lack of freedom to roam.

==== Republic of Ireland ====
Keep Ireland Open is a voluntary campaign organisation with the aim of improving access to the countryside. Journalist Fintan O'Toole called Irish law "perhaps the most negative and mean-minded regime for walkers in Europe". Access rights in Ireland have been described as being "the most regressive and restrictive access legislation in Europe. Most of the routes used to reach our mountains, hills, seashores, rivers and national monuments pass over private land. In almost all cases, the walker has no right to be there." The national parks are described by Keep Ireland Open as "the only places in Ireland where freedom to roam exists", but they only cover 0.9% of the country. Comhairle na Tuaithe was established by Éamon Ó Cuív, Minister for Community, Rural and Gaeltacht Affairs in 2004 to mediate between landowners, state agencies and recreational users of the countryside.

=== North America ===
==== United States ====
Because American property rights include the right to exclude others, the freedom to roam does not generally exist in the United States. But under some circumstances, long-term use of a path across private property may legally establish a prescriptive easement for the public. On federally owned property, the Property Clause of Article IV, Section III of the U.S. Constitution states that the United States Congress "shall have Power to dispose of and make all needful Rules and Regulations respecting the Territory or other Property belonging to the United States", granting the legislative branch the authority to regulate federal property "without limitations".

In the United States, governmental entities including cities, counties, states, and the federal government all manage land which are referred to as either public lands or the public domain. The majority of public lands in the United States are administered by the United States Forest Service and the Bureau of Land Management, agencies of the federal government, and include about 640 million acres of land, about 28% of the total land area of 2.27 billion acres. Any person, including non-citizens, can legally access and recreate on these lands lawfully, sometimes referred to as the North American model of land conservation. Some state and local governments enforce stricter policies on their public land, such as loitering laws and redlining practices, with some cities outright banishing certain groups of people. Here are some specific state and local policies:

- California's California Coastal Act provides a similar right for its beaches, and the Surfrider Foundation has been successful suing littoral property owners who try to use trespassing laws to restrict public access to the public portions of a beach. The California Coastal Act outlines the mission and authority of the California Coastal Commission, which enforces the act.
- Florida's state constitution establishes a public trust of "sovereignty lands", including wet beaches "below mean high water lines ... for all the people," respecting a freedom to roam there, regardless of any private neighboring dry beach. Local ordinances typically limit this freedom strictly to roaming on foot, and prohibit driving motor vehicles or beaching boats.
- The State of Hawaii grants beach and coastal access to local residents and visitors. These beach transit corridors are considered public property defined as the "areas extending seaward of the shoreline". Coastal land owners are also required to maintain vegetation that would inhibit beach access as there are many varieties of fast growing coastal plants that can easily limit public access.
- Maine allows access to any outdoor property unless posted. Posting requires clearly marking with complying signs or paint. Signs must indicate that access is prohibited, that access is prohibited without permission of the landowner or the landowner's agent, or that access for a particular purpose is prohibited.
- In St. Louis, Missouri, the government bans many homeless people from large areas of the city. Those who violate the orders have been jailed for months.
- New Hampshire common law gives members of the public the right to access unposted land.
- The Oregon Beach Bill was a piece of landmark legislation in the U.S. state of Oregon, passed by the 1967 session of the Oregon Legislature. It established public ownership of land along the Oregon Coast from the water up to sixteen vertical feet above the low tide mark.
- In Pennsylvania, the 1966 Recreational Use of Land and Water Act (RULWA) limits landowners' liability for personal injury and property damage if they make their land available to the public for recreation. The statute encourages landowners to open their undeveloped land for recreational use.
- The constitution of Rhode Island protects shore access, including swimming and gathering of seaweed. The 1982 Rhode Island Supreme Court decision in State v. Ibbison defines the end of private land as the mean high tide line, which is difficult to determine in day-to-day activities, and has resulted in beach access conflicts. Underfunding of the Rhode Island Coastal Resources Management Council has resulted in lax enforcement against encroachment on public access and building of illegal structures.
- Vermont's constitution allows the public the right to hunt, fish and trap on open private land. A landowner who does not want to allow this access has a legal right to post signs that restrict this right.

==== Canada ====
Much of Canada is Crown land administered by the provinces and territories. Some is leased for commercial activity, such as forestry or mining, but on much of it there is free access for recreational activities like hiking, cycling, canoeing, cross-country skiing, horse back riding, and licensed hunting and fishing, etc. At the same time access can be restricted or limited for various reasons (e.g., to protect public safety or resources, including the protection of wild plants and animals). Canadian National Parks have been created from Crown land and are administered by the Canadian Federal Government. There are also provincial parks and nature reserves that have been similarly created. The Indigenous peoples in Canada may have specific rights on Crown land established under treaties signed when Canada was a British colony, and have claimed ownership of some Crown land.

In Ontario, Canadian citizens and people who have lived in Canada for at least 7 months of the preceding 12-month period are allowed to camp for free up to 21 days on any one site in a calendar year, on crown land/conservation reserves.

=== Australia ===
Although formerly six British colonies, Australians only have limited access to the land, according to The Sydney Morning Herald. However, much of Australia's land area is Crown land, which is administered by the Australian states, and while a lot of this consists of pastoral leases, and land owned and run by Aboriginal people (e.g. APY lands), access is normally permitted for recreational purposes to “unallocated” Crown land; though motorized vehicles are required to follow roads.

=== New Zealand ===
There is extensive public access in New Zealand, including waterways and the coast, but it is "often fragmented and difficult to locate".

The "Queen's Chain" is a concept in New Zealand property law. It is a strip of public land, usually 20 metres (or one chain in pre-metric measure) wide along rivers, lakes and the coast line. It was designed to prevent land upriver or along a coast being inaccessible to any prospective buyers. The strips are incomplete and their exact modern location can be complex to determine. These strips exist in various forms (including road reserves, esplanade reserves, esplanade strips, marginal strips and reserves of various types) but not as extensively and consistently as is often assumed.

In 2007, the government of New Zealand reviewed the rights of public access for outdoor recreation. However, unlike the United Kingdom, "the New Zealand review recommended no increase in the public's right to access private property".

== See also ==
- Adverse possession – Property law concept
- Air rights – Type of real estate ownership right
- Boundaries in landscape history
- Campsite – Place used for overnight stay in the outdoors
- Castle doctrine – Legal concept
- Commons – Concept in political economics
- Easement – Right to use or enter real property
- Freedom of movement – Right of people to travel within and outside their own country
- Romani people
- Land rights – Form of law that deals with the rights to use, alienate, or exclude others from land
- Land use – Classification of land resources based on what can be built and on its use
- Loitering – Remaining in a place without an apparent purpose
- Nomadic pastoralism – Form of pastoralism
- Open Spaces Society – UK registered charity championing public paths and open spaces
- Prior-appropriation water rights – Legal doctrine for rights to water use
- Property – Entity owned by a person or a group of people
- Public land – Land owned by a national, subnational, or local government
- Public space – Places generally open and accessible to everyone
- Public trust doctrine – Principle regarding sovereign use of private property
- Right of way (transit) – Legal authority to use a specific route
- Right of way (disambiguation)
- Riparian water rights – Property rights adjacent to waterways
- Trespass – Legal concept of intentional interference
- Transhumance – Type of pastoralism
- Vagrancy – Condition of homelessness without regular employment or income
- Wilderness – Undisturbed natural environment
