= Long Distance Walkers Association =

- Founded: 1972
- Founder: Chris Steer, Alan and Barbara Blatchford
- Type: Not for profit, volunteer-led organisation
- Purpose: Long distance walking
- Region served: England, Wales and Scotland
- Members: 10,000+
- Chairperson: Madeleine Watson
- Website: www.ldwa.org.uk

The Long Distance Walkers Association (LDWA) is a British not for profit, volunteer-led association whose aim is "to further the common interests of those who enjoy Long Distance Walking" in rural, urban, mountainous, coastal and moorland areas. The LDWA is recognised as the sports governing body for the discipline of "long distance walking" in England, Wales and Scotland.

== Activities ==
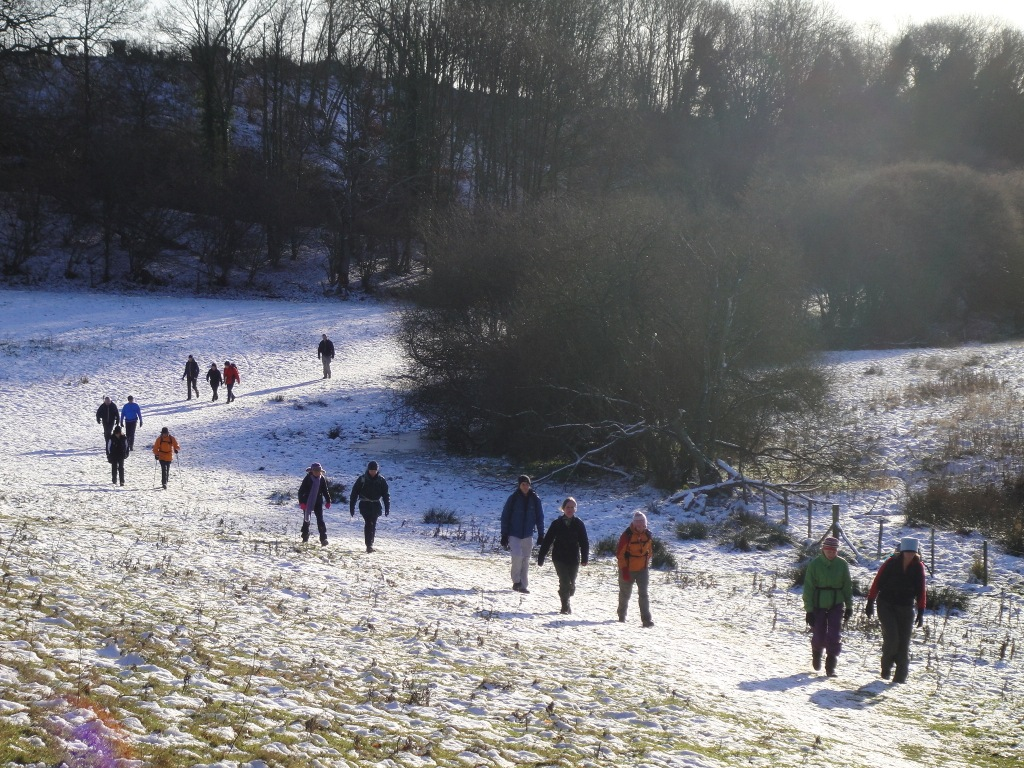
A walk around Farnham

The LDWA has over 40 local groups, which organise challenge events and social walks. It publishes a journal, Strider, three times a year, and maintains a data base of long-distance paths, and registers of achievements in hillwalking and trail walking.

Walks fall into two categories:

1. Social walks (also referred to as group walks) are normally led walks of anything up to 30 miles in length and recorded on the social walk database available to members.
2. Challenge events are normally between 20 and 100 miles, self-led (participants navigate the route based on written instructions, within a time limit). Challenge events are marshalled: participants must call in at clipper points or checkpoints to get a tally card punched to show they are following the route.

The annual "Hundred" is the LDWA's flagship event and has been recognised as the longest-running 100-mile ultramarathon in the world, although it is not a race. It is held every year in a different part of the country, on the late May bank holiday, when up to 500 people gather to walk or run 100 miles in a maximum 48 hours. All participants will have completed a qualifying event of at least 50 miles. The first 100-mile event held was the Downsman 100 in 1973. There have been two years without a hundred-mile event: 2001, when foot and mouth closed the countryside, and 2020, when COVID-19 prevented the event taking place. COVID-19 also affected the 2021 event which was run as the Sir Fynwy virtual 100, with participants walking their own routes and providing evidence of completion. The 50th Hundred, the Elephant, Bear and Bull 100, took place in May 2023 and also marked the event's half-century. Three people completed the event at the age of 81, although all were slightly younger than Henry Bridge, who became the oldest-ever finisher in 1992, also aged 81. A documentary video series produced by the LDWA media team follows the personal stories of various participants navigating a largely off-road route taking in Birmingham, Stratford-upon-Avon and Coventry. In 2024 at the Speyside 100, Henry's record was broken by Jim Catchpole and Roger Osgood, both aged 82 completed the event.

The LDWA has the most comprehensive online database of long-distance paths in the UK. Access is available to members and non-members alike, with members receiving additional benefits, for example unlimited downloadable GPX files of routes.

The association also maintains a National Trails Register, with membership categories for people who report completion of five, 10, 15 or all 19 of the National Trails (in England and Wales) and Great Trails (in Scotland). It also maintains a Hillwalkers' Register, recording the names of people who have reached all the summits of various categories of hills in England, Wales and the Southern Uplands of Scotland. These include the Wainwright Hills in the Lake District, and the County Tops of England and Wales. Records for the Scottish Highlands are maintained by the Scottish Mountaineering Club.

== See also ==
- Hiking
- Walking in the United Kingdom
- Long-distance trail
