= Tom Stephenson (activist) =

British journalist and walkers' rights activist

Tom Criddle Stephenson (1893–1987) was a British journalist and a leading champion of walkers' rights in the countryside.

In the First World War he was imprisoned as a conscientious objector.

He was for many years from 1948 the Secretary of the Ramblers' Association. He is credited with having inspired the creation of the Pennine Way, the first of Britain's long-distance footpaths, through an article he wrote for the Daily Herald in 1935, and his subsequent lobbying work with MPs as Ramblers' Association Secretary. He wrote the first official guidebook for the Way, published after it officially opened on 24 April 1965, when he was 72. The guide was published by HMSO for the Countryside Commission in 1969.

He was also a long-serving committee member of the Commons, Open Spaces and Footpaths Preservation Society (now the Open Spaces Society). He complained to close colleagues that the Society's committee was boring, but that it was necessary to maintain a strong presence to prevent it from caving in to landowners' interests, as had happened in the 1930s under the Access to Mountains Act 1939 (subsequently repealed).
