= Chase Walk =

Scouting-associated navigation competition in Staffordshire

The Chase Walk is an annual 38.2 mile competitive walking event held in Cannock Chase, Staffordshire, England. The walk takes place in springtime every year where teams of between 4 and 7 people attempt to complete the distance in the fastest time possible while navigating their way around Cannock Chase. It is hosted by The Scout Association, for members of the Scout and Guide movements and other outdoor groups including university walking groups and even air cadets.

The starting times are usually staggered between 6 am and 7 am. Before a team is allowed to walk they must have a kit check which takes place 30 minutes before their start time.

Entrance fee of £14 per walker applies, covering the cost of event marshalling, camping, snacks, drinks and transportation back to the start for those who retire early. Teams are tracked via GPS. Each year all finishing teams are given a cloth badge.

A strict kit list must be adhered to and carried with each team for walkers to complete. This list includes items such as a first aid kit, the right boots, reflective clothing for walking during the hours of darkness, along with other safety equipment.

== Trophies ==
Each year a trophy called the Beaudesert Trophy (formerly the Birmingham University Trophy) is awarded to the fastest team of seven whom all finish. Before 1996 the Birmingham University trophy was awarded to the fastest team with no retirements.

Other trophies:

- Compass Trophy - both male and female members finish.
- Veterans Trophy - average age 45 or over at start and finish. Before 1996 the Veterans Trophy was awarded to the fastest team averaging 35 years or over at both start and finish. This ran from 1986.
- Rolling Pin Trophy - all members are female.
- Rock Trophy - all members aged over 14 and under 18.
- Knot Trophy - no member of the team has entered the event before.
- Crutch Trophy - any member aged 25 or over. Previously this trophy was for teams with any member aged 20 or over.
- Boot Trophy - any member aged over 18 and all under 25.

The Chase Walk manages an online archive of results since 1998:
