= Outdoor Recreations Act =

1957 Norwegian law

The Outdoor Recreation Act (Norwegian: Friluftsloven) is a Norwegian law from 1957 that codifies the most important parts of the long-standing rights of the public to access the wilderness and to exploit it in certain ways.

The purpose of the act is, according to the acts article 1;

to protect the natural basis for outdoor recreation and to safeguard the public right of access to and passage through the countryside and the right to spend time there, etc, so that opportunities for outdoor recreation as a leisure activity that is healthy, environmentally sound and gives a sense of well-being are maintained and promoted.
